= Best Screenplay Award (Vietnam Film Festival) =

Best Screenplay Award (Vietnamese: Giải kịch bản/tác giả kịch bản xuất sắc nhất) is one of the awards presented at the Vietnam Film Festival to recognize a screenwriter with the achievement in writing screenplay which has been determined the best by the juries of feature film, direct-to-video, documentary film and animated film categories.

== History ==
The category was awarded for the first time in the 2nd Vietnam Film Festival (1973). Đào Trọng Khánh holds the record in this category with four awards for his documentary scripts in 1983, 1988, 2001 and 2015.

The achievement in a direct-to-video feature film, which was first awarded in the 9th Vietnam Film Festival (1990), is no longer awarded since the 20th Vietnam Film Festival (2017). It is because this category has been removed.

== Awards ==
Festival	Category	Winner	Film	Notes
1st (1970)	not awarded			
2nd (1973)	Feature film	Bành Châu, Bùi Đình Hạc	Đường về quê mẹ	
2nd (1973)	Feature film	Vũ Lê Mai	Truyện vợ chồng anh Lực	
3rd (1975)	Animated film	Cao Thụy, Trần Ngọc Thanh	Con khỉ lạc loài	
4th (1977)	Feature film	Bành Bảo, Trần Vũ	Chuyến xe bão táp	
4th (1977)	Documentary film	Phạm Khánh Toàn	Hòn đảo ngọc	
4th (1977)	Animated film	Trần Quang Hân	Cây chổi đẹp nhất	
5th (1980)	Feature film	Nguyễn Quang Sáng	Cánh đồng hoang	
5th (1980)	Feature film	Bành Bảo (2)	Những người đã gặp	
5th (1980)	Animated film	Hồ Quảng	Cún con làm nhiệm vụ	
6th (1983)	Feature film	Đặng Nhật Minh	Thị xã trong tầm tay	
6th (1983)	Feature film	Huy Thành	Về nơi gió cát	
6th (1983)	Documentary film	Đào Trọng Khánh	Những khu vườn, Đôi mắt Tổ quốc	
6th (1983)	Science film	Nguyễn Khắc Viện	Đất Tổ nghìn xưa	
6th (1983)	Animated film	Trần Hoài Dương	Bé Rơm	
6th (1983)	Animated film	Trần Ngọc Thanh (2)	Giai điệu	
7th (1985)	Feature film	Nguyễn Mạnh Tuấn	Xa và gần	
7th (1985)	Documentary film	Trần Đình Văn, Văn Lê	Người Công giáo huyện Thống Nhất	
7th (1985)	Science film	Nguyễn Khắc Viện (2)	Đất Tây Sơn	
7th (1985)	Science film	Lại Văn Sinh	Bệnh dịch hạch	
7th (1985)	Animated film	Nguyễn Thị Vân Anh	Ai cũng phải sợ	
8th (1988)	Feature film	Trịnh Thanh Nhã	Truyện cổ tích cho tuổi mười bảy	
8th (1988)	Feature film	Đoàn Trúc Quỳnh	Thị trấn yên tĩnh	
8th (1988)	Documentary film	Đào Trọng Khánh (2), Lưu Xuân Thư	Hà Nội trong mắt ai	
8th (1988)	Science film	Lại Văn Sinh (2)	Cánh kiến đỏ	
9th (1990)	Animated film	Lâm Quang	Mèo và chuột	
10th (1993)	Feature film	Lê Hoàng	Lương tâm bé bỏng	
10th (1993)	Feature film	Nguyễn Thị Hồng Ngát	Canh bạc	
10th (1993)	Direct-to-video feature	Nguyễn Hữu Phần	Em còn nhớ hay em đã quên	
10th (1993)	Direct-to-video feature	Lê Hoàng (2)	Băng qua bóng tối	
10th (1993)	Documentary film	Văn Lê (2)	Cái Bến, Thiện và ác	
11th (1996)	Feature film	Lê Ngọc Minh	Hoa của trời, Người yêu đi lấy chồng	
11th (1996)	Direct-to-video feature	Phạm Thanh Phong	Điện thoại đồ chơi	
11th (1996)	Documentary film	Văn Lê (3)	Niềm vinh quang lặng lẽ	
12th (1999)	Feature film	Sơn Trang	Những người thợ xẻ	
12th (1999)	Documentary film	Nguyễn Thước	Trở lại Ngư Thủy, Concert, Xẩm	
12th (1999)	Animated film	Đinh Tiếp	Tổ tiên loài ếch, Quán thỏ Rô-ti	
13th (2001)	Feature film	Nguyễn Quang Lập	Đời cát, Thung lũng hoang vắng	
13th (2001)	Direct-to-video feature	Gia Vũ	Gấu cổ trắng	
13th (2001)	Documentary film	Đào Trọng Khánh (3)	Một thế kỷ - Một đời người	
13th (2001)	Animated film	Phạm Sông Đông	Xe đạp	
14th (2004)	Feature film	Nguyễn Mạnh Tuấn (2)	Lưới trời	
14th (2004)	Direct-to-video feature	Thảo Phương	Chim phí bay về cội nguồn	
14th (2004)	Documentary film	Phan Thanh Tú	Sự nhọc nhằn của cát	
14th (2004)	Animated film	Hồ Quảng (2)	Cuộc sống	
15th (2007)	Feature film	Lê Ngọc Minh (2), Gao Xufan	Hà Nội, Hà Nội	
15th (2007)	Documentary film	Đào Thanh Tùng	Làng đàn ông	
15th (2007)	Animated film	Phong Thu	Ếch chia trăng	
16th (2009)	Feature film	Đặng Nhật Minh (2)	Đừng đốt	
16th (2009)	Direct-to-video feature	Huy Thành	Đường đua	
16th (2009)	Documentary film	Phan Huyền Thư	Chất xám	
16th (2009)	Animated film	Huyền Vũ, Mỹ Linh	Thỏ và Rùa	
17th (2011)	Feature film	Hoàng Nhuận Cầm	Mùi cỏ cháy	
17th (2011)	Science film	Nguyễn Thu Tuyết	Bướm - Côn trùng cánh vảy	
17th (2011)	Animated film	Nguyễn Thu Trang	Chiếc lá	
18th (2013)	Feature film	Nguyễn Anh Dũng	Những người viết huyền thoại	
18th (2013)	Direct-to-video feature	Nguyễn Thu Dung, Trần Trung Dũng, Nguyễn Trực	Nước mắt người cha	
18th (2013)	Documentary film	Đào Thanh Tùng (2)	André Menras - Một người Việt	
18th (2013)	Science film	Nguyễn Hoàng Lâm	Bí mật từ những pho tượng Phật	
18th (2013)	Animated film	Nguyễn Thu Trang (2)	Bù nhìn rơm	
19th (2015)	Feature film	Đinh Thiên Phúc	Thầu Chín ở Xiêm	
19th (2015)	Feature film	Nguyễn Thu Dung (2), Đặng Thái Huyền	Người trở về	
19th (2015)	Documentary film	Đào Trọng Khánh (4)	Giọt nước giữa đại dương	
19th (2015)	Science film	Tạ Thị Huệ	Ứng dụng công nghệ tế bào gốc chữa bệnh	
19th (2015)	Animated film	Phạm Thị Thanh Hà, Phạm Đình Hải	Những mặt phẳng	
20th (2017)	Feature film	Bùi Kim Quy, Lương Đình Dũng	Cha cõng con	
20th (2017)	Documentary film	Đào Thanh Tùng (3)	Việt Nam thời bao cấp	
20th (2017)	Science film	Lê Thị Thanh Bình	Thuyền biển Việt Nam	
20th (2017)	Animated film	Hoàng Phương Thảo, Phạm Sông Đông (2)	Cậu bé Ma-nơ-canh	
21st (2019)	Feature film	Nhất Trung	Cua lại vợ bầu	
21st (2019)	Documentary film	Tạ Thị Huệ (2)	Lão gàn Hồ Mơ	
21st (2019)	Science film	Lê Danh Trường	Ghép tạng	
21st (2019)	Animated film	Phạm Thị Thanh Hà (2)	Vầng sáng ấm áp	
22nd (2021)	Feature film	Trấn Thành, Bùi Trương Hữu Nhi, Hồ Thúc An	Bố già	
22nd (2021)	Documentary film	Nguyễn Hạnh Lê	Kỳ tích chinh phục một dòng sông	
22nd (2021)	Science film	Lê Danh Trường (2)	Tắc mạch xạ trị	
22nd (2021)	Animated film	Bùi Hoài Thu	Người thầy của muôn đời	

== Notes ==
- Before the 15th Vietnam Film Festival (2007), Documentary film and Science film were counted as one category for judging and grading.
