= Đặng Nhật Minh =

Vietnamese film director (born 1938)

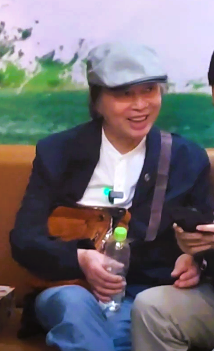
- Born: May 10, 1938 (age 88); Hue, Annam, French Indochina
- Occupations: Director and screenwriter
- Years active: 1965–present
- Relatives: Đặng Văn Ngữ (father)

Đặng Nhật Minh (born May 11, 1938) is a filmmaker and politician, the first Vietnamese to receive a Lifetime Achievement Award at an international film festival. He is famous for films such as Don't Burn, Girl on the River, Nostalgia for Countryland, and The Season of Guavas; especially When the Tenth Month Comes, which many news agencies consider one of the best Asian films of all time. He is considered one of the leading directors of Vietnamese cinema.

Starting with documentary films commissioned by film studios and the Vietnamese government, Dang Nhat Minh gradually created his own works. Persistently adhering to the principle of directing only films for which he wrote the scripts, he created works with consistent expression and a strong personal style. Except for his first two works, almost all of Dang Nhat Minh's feature films have won awards both domestically and internationally. Besides filmmaking, he was also the general secretary of the Vietnam Film Association.

With domestic success in The Town within Reach, Dang Nhat Minh began to gain international recognition when When the Tenth Month Comes became the first Vietnamese film to be screened in the United States and received the Peace Protection Committee award at the Moscow International Film Festival held in the Soviet Union. Later, Nostalgia for Countryland helped him solidify his position by winning the Kodak Award at the Asia-Pacific Film Festival, the NETPAC Best Asian Award at the Rotterdam International Film Festival, and numerous other awards. For his contributions to Vietnamese cinema, he was awarded the title of Vietnamese People's Artist and received the Hồ Chí Minh Prize in the field of cinema and the Grand Prize of the Bui Xuan Phai Award – For the Love of Hanoi.

== Biography ==
=== Early life ===
Dang Nhat Minh was born on May 11, 1938 in Thừa Thiên – Huế, Annam (now Huế city, Vietnam). His father, Đặng Văn Ngữ, was a medical doctor whose research led him to work frequently abroad, such as in Japan from 1943–1950. Because of this Minh and his siblings were largely raised by his mother.

In 1950, Minh was sent by the Vietnamese Communist Party(VCP) to a Chinese military school. In his autobiography he describes this period of his education as filled with brainwashing and self censorship. After four years of schooling in China, the VCP sent him to study Russian in the USSR so that he could become an interpreter. His entire education was decided for him ahead of time by the Communist Party.

His first work within cinema was translating Russian films made in the USSR to Vietnamese. During this time, Minh also learnt more about the inner workings of cinema production, something credited to his mastery of Russian and his long exposure to Russian film. When his dad died during the Vietnam war 1967 he was given party related career favours which combined with his auto-dictation allowed him to become a director. His first film was a documentary about geology.

=== Career ===
==== Inspiration/Influence ====
A strong influence on Minh’s work as a filmmaker was provided by his uncle Nguyễn Hồng Phong. In his autobiography, he mentions (p. 41–42):

“Through literature, poetry, metaphors, pop songs, the study of pictorial art, my uncle taught me to think in images, a quality indispensable for a filmmaker. […] To do one’s job well, a film director cannot be satisfied with simply mastering some techniques. What matters the most for this profession is one’s personal worldview and aesthetic. Without these, the director is just a skilful craftsman. Since the beginning of my career till this day, all that I have brought to cinema, I owe it to what my uncle taught me. He allowed me to forge my own vision of the world which gave birth to my creations.”

As part of a generation that lived through the difficult war situation, becoming a filmmaker and being able to make films is something out of the ordinary. Minh considers his being able to make films “a miracle” and largely credits it to luck. He also believes that it is with the support of his ancestors that has allowed him to make films.

==== Filmic works ====
Dang Nhat Minh started his career in film by making documentaries with topics ranging from geography, ethnography to history. Notable works during this time includes: Following the Geologists (Theo chân những người địa chất, 1965), Ha Bac My Hometown (Hà Bắc quê hương, 1967), May – Faces (Tháng 5 – Những gương mặt, 1975), Nguyen Trai (Nguyễn Trãi, 1980).

As a documentarist, he became the government’s observer and reporter of historical events in Vietnam. For instance, in 1975 the government sent him as a representative to Saigon during the last days of the liberation, documenting the event in film.

He started his feature film career by adapting existing plays, generating such works as Stars on the Sea (Những ngôi sao biển, 1977), A Year-end Rainy Day (Ngày mưa cuối năm, 1980).

Around 1980, he wrote a short story named "The Town Within Reach." It was published in the Văn Nghệ (Literature and Arts) magazine and won a prize, making him consider giving up on filmmaking to become a writer. However, not long after that, he met a scholar and close friend of his uncle Nguyen Hong Phong. This person encouraged him to make a film out of his own story. He made the film "The Town Within Reach" in 1983, marking the beginning of his filmography.

In his autobiography, he notes: "So I determined my direction: I only make films that I myself write the script, talk about issues that interest me, move me. Having found a way to exist in the world of cinema, I don't think about giving up on it anymore."

His works are dense with political arguments, in which the view in one film may conflict with that of the other. Usually placing a woman at the centre of the story, Dang Nhat Minh closely traced Vietnamese historical struggles through the Sino-Vietnamese War (The Town Within Reach – 1983), the post-war period (When The Tenth Month Comes – 1984, The Girl on the River – 1987), the Đổi Mới economic reforms (The Return – 1994), and came back to one of the darkest phases in the post-independence Vietnam – The 1950s land reform in North Vietnam (The Guava Season – 2000). Except for explicit propaganda movies such as Miss Nhung, Don't Burn, and Hanoi: Winter 1946, there is often one unifying theme that runs through most of his films: Betrayal.

In his works, Minh wants to create portraits of the “symbols of Vietnam” and to focus on “ordinary people”. He wants to let the world discover the life of these people in times of war as well as in times of peace after the reunification, filming bourgeois as well as peasants. He often centres his stories around women, whose memories and experiences in times of conflict are often forgotten.

Minh occasionally focuses on historical figures, such as the scholar and politician Nguyễn Trãi, a film ordered by the department of cinema in 1980 or the president Hô Chi Minh in the political documentary Hanoi: Winter 1946.

Apart from his film-making activities, Minh also had responsibilities as the elected General Secretary of the Vietnam Film Association. According to his autobiography, he especially had difficulties in having sufficient political say and being heard by the government.

He was the former General Secretary of the Vietnam Film Association for more than 10 years (1989-2000) where he constantly received a strong mandate through polling from members. However, he withdrew from his position as he disliked the change in politics of the association, stating that he was glad to leave and pleased to see that he had not lost himself over the years.

==== On the international stage ====
He received numerous international awards and was part of the jury of numerous festivals such as the Fukuoka festival and Locarno festival. Some of his films have also been funded by foreign countries, including Great Britain and Japan, a proof of the filmmaker's fame. These opportunities have enabled him more freedom in writing his screenplay.

In his autobiography however, Minh notes a contradiction between the internationally constructed vision of him as head of Vietnamese cinema and symbol of Doi Moi, and his controversial image in Vietnam.

== Censorship ==
Dang Nhat Minh experienced censorship in the production of all his films. Before shooting any film, he had to submit the screenplay to authorities to gain their approval. He must often cut out parts, modify the plot and characters, sometimes for obscure reasons. Some of his scripts were even rejected without any reason. In his autobiography, Dang Nhat Minh talks about how censorship is a real barrier to the conditions of film production. After having one of his first films banned from shooting, he asked the artistic director of the film studio about the definition of a socialist screenplay. The answer was that "the ending must be happy," and it must sing praises of harmony and socialism.

Since all his films were funded by the government (except for "Nostalgia for the Countryside," which was his first film to be allowed to choose the funding sources), Dang Nhat Minh had to find a way to work within the ideological constraints to speak his mind about the human condition in Vietnamese society.

His early films were decided to be black and white by the director of Vietnam Feature Film Studio. As he recalled, Vietnam-produced films were divided into two groups: export-oriented films and films for the domestic market. Export-oriented films were prioritised to be colour, under the condition that they must show off a face of Vietnam that has bright cities, fashions, hotels and restaurants, industrial productivity, heroic fighting, etc. However, he feels lucky that his screenplays were placed on the list for black and white film funding.

One example is the film "When The Tenth Month Comes." After authorities reviewed the screenplay numerous times, they forewarned Dang Nhat Minh that he would be allowed to make the film under the condition that the widow whose husband died in the war must not fall in love with the village's teacher. Dang Nhat Minh agreed but still tried to imply it in the film. The film screening for authorities went smoothly; however, they raised another concern for a scene that looked "superstitious." Dang Nhat Minh defended the scene, insisting that it was an essential characteristic of Vietnamese culture. The film was reviewed 13 times in total, making Dang Nhat Minh feel like he was a criminal dragged to trials after trials. At last, the scene was allowed to be screened but had to be shortened.

Another example was The Girl On The River (1987). Heavily criticised by a high-ranked official in the Vietnamese government, it was only screened at one festival before disappearing in official screenings in Vietnam.

== Filmography ==
=== Documentary ===
Year	Title	Original title	Writer	Note	Ref.
1965	On the Trails of Geologists	Theo chân người địa chất	Yes		
1967	Ha Bac – My Native Land	Hà Bắc quê hương	Yes		
1975	The Faces of May	Tháng Năm – Những gương mặt	Yes		
1980	Nguyễn Trãi	Nguyễn Trãi	Yes		
2015	Le Ba Dang – From Bich La to Paris	Lê Bá Đảng – Từ Bích La đến Paris	Yes	Short	

=== Film ===
Year	Title	Original title	Writer	Note	Ref.
1970	Miss Nhung	Chị Nhung	No		
1977	Sea stars	Những ngôi sao biển	Yes		
1980		Ngày mưa cuối năm	Yes		
1983	The Town Is Within the Range	Thị xã trong tầm tay	Yes		
1984	When the Tenth Month Comes	Bao giờ cho đến tháng Mười	Yes		
1987	The Girl on the River	Cô gái trên sông	Yes		
1994	The Return	Trở về	Yes		
1995	Nostalgia for the Countryside	Thương nhớ đồng quê	Yes		
1997	Hanoi: Winter 1946	Hà Nội mùa đông năm 46	Yes		
2001	The Guava Season	Mùa ổi	Yes		
2002	The Quiet American	Người Mỹ trầm lặng	No	Second unit director	
2009	Don't Burn	Đừng đốt	Yes		
2022	Jasmine	Hoa nhài	Yes		

== Awards and recognition ==
Dang Nhat Minh was awarded the title of Merited Artist in 1988, People's Artist in 1993, and the First Class Labor Order in 1998 by the Vietnamese Government. By 1999, he had received the Nikkei Asia Prize of "Culture and Community" for his contributions to Asian cinema. In South Korea, he was honored twice with the "Lifetime Achievement Award for Outstanding tribute to Asian cinema" and the Kim Daejung Peace Film Award at Gwangju International Film Festival in 2005 and 2013. He also became the first Vietnamese film director to win a Lifetime Achievement Award at a foreign film festival. In 2007, he was awarded the Hồ Chí Minh Prize for his works: The Town Is Within the Range, When the Tenth Month Comes, Hanoi: Winter 1946 and The Guava Season. In 2010, he became the first Vietnamese director to be honored by the Academy of Motion Picture Arts and Sciences for his dedication to film. And in 2016, he was awarded the Licorne d'Or for his entire film career at the Amiens International Film Festival.

On March 31, 2022 at the French Embassy in Hanoi, Dang Nhat Minh was awarded the Ordre des Arts et des Lettres by ambassador Nicolas Warnery, representative of the French Ministry of Culture, in recognition of his contributions to enhancing cultural understanding between the two countries of Vietnam and France. Ambassador Nicolas Warnery affirmed that France recognized the contributions of Dang Nhat Minh not only in his humanitarian works screened in France, cooperative films such as Spring or the cinema association between the two countries during his time as general secretary of the Cinema Association, but also during his time as an interpreter for French film crews to Vietnam.

=== Awards and nominations ===
Year	Film Festival	Category	Nominated work	Result	Ref.
Vietnam Film Festival
1977	4th Vietnam Film Festival	Documentary	The Faces of May	Silver Lotus	
1980	5th Vietnam Film Festival	Documentary	Nguyễn Trãi	Silver Lotus	
1983	6th Vietnam Film Festival	Feature film	The Town Is Within the Range	Golden Lotus	
1983	6th Vietnam Film Festival	Best Screenplay	The Town Is Within the Range	Won	
1985	7th Vietnam Film Festival	Feature film	When the Tenth Month Comes	Golden Lotus	
1985	7th Vietnam Film Festival	Best Director	When the Tenth Month Comes	Won	
1987	8th Vietnam Film Festival	Feature film	The Girl on the River	Silver Lotus	
1996	11th Vietnam Film Festival	Best Director	Nostalgia for the Countryside	Won	
1999	12th Vietnam Film Festival	Feature film	Hanoi: Winter 1946	Silver Lotus	
1999	12th Vietnam Film Festival	Best Director	Hanoi: Winter 1946	Won	
2001	13th Vietnam Film Festival	Feature film	The Guava Season	Golden Lotus	
2009	16th Vietnam Film Festival	Feature film	Don't Burn	Golden Lotus	
2009	16th Vietnam Film Festival	Best Director	Don't Burn	Won	
Kite Awards
2010	2009 Kite Awards	Movies	Don't Burn	Golden Kite	
2010	2009 Kite Awards	Best Director	Don't Burn	Won	
International Film Festival
1971	7th Moscow International Film Festival	Golden Prize	Miss Nhung	Nominated	
1985	14th Moscow International Film Festival	Golden Prize	When the Tenth Month Comes	Nominated	
1985	14th Moscow International Film Festival	Soviet Peace Committee Award	When the Tenth Month Comes	Won	
1985	Nantes Three Continents Festival	Golden Montgolfiere	When the Tenth Month Comes	Nominated	
1985	Hawaii International Film Festival	Special Jury Award	When the Tenth Month Comes	Won	
1989	Asia-Pacific Film Festival	Special Jury Award	When the Tenth Month Comes	Won	
1994	Asia-Pacific Film Festival	Special Jury Award	The Return	Won	
1995	Asia-Pacific Film Festival	Kodak	Nostalgia for the Countryside	Won	
1996	International Film Festival Rotterdam	NETPAC Award	Nostalgia for the Countryside	Won	
1996	Nantes Three Continents Festival	Audience Award	Nostalgia for the Countryside	Won	
1996	Nantes Three Continents Festival	Golden Montgolfiere	Nostalgia for the Countryside	Nominated	
1996	FIFF	ACCT Promotional Award	Nostalgia for the Countryside	Won	
1997	Fribourg International Film Festival	Audience Award	Nostalgia for the Countryside	Won	
1997	Vesoul International Film Festival	Audience Award	Nostalgia for the Countryside	Won	
2000	Locarno International Film Festival	Youth Jury Award	The Guava Season	Won	
2000	Locarno International Film Festival	Don Quixote Award	The Guava Season	Won	
2001	International Film Festival Rotterdam	NETPAC Award	The Guava Season	Won	
2001	Oslo International Film Festival	FIPRESCI Prize	The Guava Season	Special Prize	
2009	Fukuoka International Film Festival	Audience Award	Don't Burn	Won	

== Personal life ==
Đặng Nhật Minh married Nguyễn Phương Nghi, a pianist and the daughter of lawyer Nguyễn Quế. Phương Nghi's family, including her brother Nguyễn Hoán, inspired the film "Mùa ổi" by Đặng Nhật Minh. When Professor Đặng Văn Ngữ died in 1967, Đặng Nhật Minh and his wife had their first son, Nhật Tân. Both Phương Nghi and Nhật Tân were mentioned in the last letter Đặng Văn Ngữ sent to his son. Đặng Nhật Minh also has a daughter, an otolaryngologist doctor Đặng Phương Lan. She married engineer Đinh Xuân Thọ, the son of People's Teacher Đinh Xuân Lâm, and lives with her husband in Budapest, Hungary.

== Sources ==
Vietnamese

- Central Propaganda Department of the Communist Party of Vietnam (2020). Lê Hoàng Anh; Nguyễn Hải Đăng; Nguyễn Thị Minh Trang (eds.). Tác giả, tác phẩm: Giải thưởng Hồ Chí Minh về Văn học Nghệ thuật. Nhà xuất bản Trẻ. ISBN 9786041170308.
- Đặng Nhật Minh (2005). Hồi ký điện ảnh (in Vietnamese). Thành phố Hồ Chí Minh: Nhà xuất bản Văn nghệ. OCLC 989677862.
- Hội điện ảnh Hà Nội (2000). Nhà điện ảnh Hà Nội (in Vietnamese). Hà Nội: Hội liên hiệp văn học nghệ thuật Hà Nội. OCLC 605255501.
- Ngô Phương Lan (1998). Đồng hành với màn ảnh: tiểu luận, phê bình điện ảnh (in Vietnamese). Hà Nội: Nhà xuất bản Văn hóa thông tin. OCLC 606352645.
- Ngô Phương Lan (2005). Tính hiện đại và tính dân tộc trong điện ảnh Việt Nam (in Vietnamese). Hà Nội: Nhà xuất bản Văn hóa thông tin. OCLC 607606153.
- Nguyễn Hoàng Đức (2000). Cô đơn con người, cô đơn thi sĩ: tiểu luận-phê bình (in Vietnamese). Hà Nội: Nhà xuất bản Văn hóa dân tộc. OCLC 604393853.
- Nguyễn Thị Hồng Ngát (2005). Lịch sử điện ảnh Việt Nam (in Vietnamese). Vol. 2. Hà Nội: Vietnam Film Bureau. OCLC 53129383.
- Nhiều tác giả (2007). Hành trình nghiên cứu điện ảnh Việt Nam (in Vietnamese). Hà Nội: Nhà xuất bản Văn hóa thông tin. OCLC 989966481.
- Phan Bích Hà (2003). Hiện thực thứ hai (in Vietnamese). Nhà xuất bản Văn hóa thông tin. OCLC 62394229.
- Quân đội nhân dân Việt Nam (1999). "Giải thưởng Nikkei Asia Prizes". Văn nghệ Quân đội. ISSN 2354-1296. OCLC 1796063.
- Quốc hội Việt Nam (2002). Phan Trung Lý (ed.). Đại biểu quốc hội từ Khóa I đến Khóa X. (in Vietnamese). Văn phòng Quốc hội. OCLC 1153942910.
- Thông tấn xã Việt Nam (2005). "Director Dang Nhat Minh". Vietnam Pictorial. 562. OCLC 839208591.
- Trần Hữu Lục (2004). Tượng đài sông Hương: tập bút ký (in Vietnamese). Nhà xuất bản Trẻ. OCLC 58532543.
- Văn phòng Bộ Văn hóa và Thông tin (2000). Hành trình vào thiên niên kỷ mới (in Vietnamese). Hà Nội: Ministry of Culture and Information. OCLC 645819839.
- Viện nghệ thuật và lưu trữ điện ảnh (1994). Diễn viên điện ảnh Việt Nam (in Vietnamese). Hà Nội: Nhà xuất bản Văn hóa Thông tin. OCLC 33133770.

English

- Banerjee, Shampa (1993). International Film Festival of India, 1993, New Delhi. New Delhi: Ministry of Information and Broadcasting. OCLC 624274165.
- Beattie, Keith (2000). The Scar That Binds: American Culture and the Vietnam War. New York University Press. ISBN 9780814798690.
- Berra, John (2008). Declarations of Independence: American Cinema and the Partiality of Independent Production. Intellect Books. ISBN 9781841501857.
- Blum-Reid, Sylvie (2003). East-West Encounters: Franco-Asian Cinema and Literature. London: Wallflower. ISBN 9781903364673.
- Bradley, Mark Philip (2001). "Contests of Memory: Remembering and Forgetting War in the Contemporary Vietnamese Cinema". In Hue-Tam Ho Tai (ed.). The Country of Memory: Remaking the Past in Late Socialist Vietnam. Berkeley: California University Press. ISBN 9780520222670.
- Bradley, Mark Philip (2020). Vietnam at War. Oxford: Oxford University Press. ISBN 9780192895783.
- Charlot, John (1989). "Vietnamese Cinema: The Power of the Past". The Journal of American Folklore. 102 (406): 442–452. doi:10.2307/541783. ISSN 0021-8715. JSTOR 541783.
- Charlot, John (1991). "Vietnamese Cinema: First Views". Journal of Southeast Asian Studies. 22 (1): 33–62. doi:10.1017/S0022463400005452. ISSN 0022-4634. JSTOR 20071262. S2CID 163045055.
- DeBoer, Stephanie (2014). Coproducing Asia: Locating Japanese–Chinese Regional Film and Media. Minnesota University Press. ISBN 9781452940946.
- Dissanayake, Wimal (1994). Colonialism and Nationalism in Asian Cinema. Indiana University Press. ISBN 9780253116475.
- Dönmez-Colin, Gönül (2014-04-15). "Vesoul 2013". Kinema: A Journal for Film and Audiovisual Media. doi:10.15353/kinema.vi.1313. ISSN 2562-5764.
- Drummond, Lisa; Thomas, Mandy (2005). Consuming Urban Culture in Contemporary Vietnam. Routledge. ISBN 9781134433759.
- Fu, Poshek; Yip, Man-Fung (2019). The Cold War and Asian Cinemas. Routledge. ISBN 9780429757297.
- Healy, Dana (2020). "The Lyrical Subversions of Socialist Realism in Đặng Nhật Minh's New Wave Cinema" (PDF). In Skrodzka, Aga; Lu, Xiaoning; Marciniak, Katarzyna (eds.). Oxford Handbook of Communist Visual Cultures. Oxford: Oxford University Press. pp. 541–565. doi:10.1093/oxfordhb/9780190885533.013.23. ISBN 9780190885533.
- Hixson, Walter L. (2000). Historical Memory and Representations of the Vietnam War. Taylor & Francis. ISBN 9780815335368.
- Karlin, Wayne (2009). Wandering Souls: Journeys With the Dead and the Living in Viet Nam. PublicAffairs. ISBN 9781568586106.
- Lim, David C. L.; Yamamoto, Hiroyuki (2012). Film in Contemporary Southeast Asia: Cultural Interpretation and Social Intervention. Routledge. ISBN 9781136592461.
- Malo, Jean-Jacques; Williams, Tony (1994). Vietnam War Films: Over 600 Feature, Made-for-TV, Pilot, and Short Movies, 1939–1992, from the United States, Vietnam, France, Belgium, Australia, Hong Kong, South Africa, Great Britain, and Other Countries. McFarland. ISBN 9780899507811.
- Marciniak, K.; Imre, A.; O'Healy, Áine (2007). Transnational Feminism in Film and Media. Springer. ISBN 9780230609655.
- Mast, Gerald; Kawin, Bruce F. (2000). A Short History of the Movies. Allyn & Bacon. ISBN 9780205296859.
- McGregor, Peter (July 1991). "Finding films and videos made in Vietnam in Australia". Asian Studies Review. 15 (1): 174–175. doi:10.1080/03147539108712764. ISSN 1035-7823.
- McMahon, Kathryn (2002). "The works of Dang Nhat Minh". In Sarker, Sonita; De, Esha Niyogi (eds.). Trans-Status Subjects: Gender in the Globalization of South and Southeast Asia. Duke University Press. pp. 108–125. ISBN 9780822329923.
- Planet, Lonely; Stewart, Iain; Atkinson, Brett; et al. (2018). Lonely Planet Vietnam. Lonely Planet. ISBN 9781787019317.
- Skrodzka, Aga; Lu, Xiaoning; Marciniak, Katarzyna (2020). The Oxford Handbook of Communist Visual Cultures [Sổ tay Oxford về Văn hóa Thị giác Cộng sản]. Oxford University Press. ISBN 9780190885557.
- Sen, Krishna; Lee, Terence (2008). Political Regimes and the Media in Asia. Routledge. ISBN 9781134142149.
- Thanh Hương (2000). Vietnam, the Land and the People (3rd ed.). Hà Nội: Nhà xuất bản Thế Giới. OCLC 46837129.
- Thanh Hương (2001). Vietnam, the Land and the People (4 ed.). Hà Nội: Nhà xuất bản Thế Giới. OCLC 605369583.
- Vasudev, Aruna; Padgaonkar, Latika; Doraiswamy, Rashmi (2002). Being & Becoming, the Cinemas of Asia. Macmillan. ISBN 9780333938201.
- Wiseman, Geoffrey (2015). Isolate or Engage: Adversarial States, US Foreign Policy, and Public Diplomacy. Stanford University Press. ISBN 9780804795555.
- Westrup, Laurel (2006). "Toward a New Canon: The Vietnam Conflict Through Vietnamese Lenses". Film & History: An Interdisciplinary Journal of Film and Television Studies. 36 (2): 45–51. doi:10.1353/flm.2006.0040. ISSN 1548-9922. S2CID 162402042.
- Zatko, Martin; Emmons, Ron (2012). The Rough Guide to Vietnam. Penguin. ISBN 9781409359371.

Other language

- ССОД [in Russian] (1971). "Культура и жизнь: ежемесячный журнал Союза советских обществ дружбы и культурной связи с зарубежными странами" [Văn hóa và Đời sống: tạp chí hàng tháng của ССОД]. Kultura i zhizn (in Russian). Moskva: Soi︠u︡z. ISSN 0023-5199. OCLC 1033842238.
- Healy, Dana (2013). "Vom Triumph zur Tragödie: Krieg im vietnamesischen Film" [Từ Chiến thắng đến Bi kịch: Chiến tranh trong Phim Việt Nam]. südostasien – Zeitschrift für Politik • Kultur • Dialog [Đông Nam Á – Tạp chí Chính trị • Văn hóa • Đối thoại] (in German). 29 (4): Politik. doi:10.11588/SOA.2013.4.3901. eISSN 2625-5391. ISSN 1434-7067.
- Iskusstvo (1987). "XIV Московский международный кинофестиваль" [Liên hoan phim quốc tế Moscow lần thứ XIV]. Ekran (in Russian). OCLC 977077303.
- Kawaguchi, Keiko (August 2001). "Películas vietnamitas de los noventa" [Phim Việt Nam những năm 1990]. Nosferatu: Revista de cine [Nosferatu: Tạp chí phim] (in Spanish). Donostia Kultura: 123–130. ISSN 1130-1732.
- Liên hiệp các nhà quay phim Liên Xô, Союза работников кинематографии СССР (1985). "XIV Московском международном кинофестивале" [Liên hoan phim quốc tế Moscow lần thứ XIV]. Искусство кино (in Russian). 7–12. OCLC 48062042.
- Liên đoàn các câu lạc bộ Điện ảnh Pháp, Fédération Français des Ciné-Clubs (1997). "Vesoul: Festival du film asiatique" [Vesoul: Liên hoan phim Châu Á]. Cinéma (in French). 583–596. ISSN 0045-6926. OCLC 1235470934.
