= Best Actor Award (Vietnam Film Festival) =

Best Actor Award (Vietnamese: Giải nam diễn viên chính xuất sắc) is one of the awards presented at the Vietnam Film Festival to recognize an actor for the performance which has been determined the best by the juries in the feature film and direct-to-video categories.

== History ==
The category was awarded for the first time in the 2nd Vietnam Film Festival (1973) for Huy Công, he also holds the record in this category with two awards. Lê Công Tuấn Anh was also awarded two but one of them is for the role in a direct-to-video feature film.

The achievement in a direct-to-video feature film, which was first awarded in the 9th Vietnam Film Festival (1990), is no longer awarded since the 20th Vietnam Film Festival (2017). It is because this category has been removed.

== Awards ==
Festival	Category	Winner	Film	Notes
1st (1970)	not awarded			
2nd (1973)	Feature film	Huy Công	Ga	
3rd (1975)	Feature film	not awarded		
4th (1977)	Feature film	Huy Công (2)	Đứa con nuôi	
5th (1980)	Feature film	Thế Anh	Mối tình đầu	
5th (1980)	Feature film	Lâm Tới	Cánh đồng hoang, Mùa gió chướng	
6th (1983)	Feature film	Lý Huỳnh	Vùng gió xoáy	
6th (1983)	Feature film	Bùi Cường	Làng Vũ Đại ngày ấy	
7th (1985)	Feature film	Hữu Mười	Bao giờ cho đến tháng Mười	
7th (1985)	Feature film	Nguyễn Chánh Tín	Ván bài lật ngửa: Trời xanh qua kẽ lá	
8th (1988)	Feature film	Trịnh Thịnh	Thị trấn yên tĩnh, Thằng Bờm	
9th (1990)	Feature film	Bắc Sơn	Người tìm vàng	
9th (1990)	Children feature film	Nguyễn Thanh Bình	Tuổi thơ dữ dội	
9th (1990)	Direct-to-video	not awarded		
10th (1993)	Feature film	Lê Công Tuấn Anh	Vị đắng tình yêu	
10th (1993)	Feature film	Trần Lực	Đời hát rong	
10th (1993)	Children feature film	Actor in the role Hùng "sẹo"	Chú bé có tài mở khóa	
10th (1993)	Direct-to-video	Lê Công Tuấn Anh (2)	Hiệp sĩ cuối cùng, Em còn nhớ hay em đã quên	
11th (1996)	Feature film	Thiệu Ánh Dương	Lưỡi dao, Bản tình ca trong đêm	
11th (1996)	Direct-to-video	Trần Hạnh	Nước mắt đàn bà	
12th (1999)	Feature film	Quốc Trị	Những người thợ xẻ	
12th (1999)	Feature film	Công Ninh	Ai xuôi vạn lý	
12th (1999)	Direct-to-video	not awarded		
13th (2001)	Feature film	Bùi Bài Bình	Mùa ổi	
13th (2001)	Direct-to-video	Hoàng Phi	Gấu cổ trắng	
14th (2005)	Feature film	Đức Khuê	Của rơi, Hàng xóm	
14th (2005)	Direct-to-video	Mạnh Cường	Không còn gì để nói	
15th (2007)	Feature film	Quốc Khánh	Áo lụa Hà Đông	
15th (2007)	Direct-to-video	Nguyễn Văn Bình	Đêm vùng biên	
16th (2009)	Feature film	Dustin Nguyễn	Huyền thoại bất tử	
16th (2009)	Direct-to-video	Trung Hiếu	13 bến nước	
17th (2011)	Feature film	Quách Ngọc Ngoan	Long thành cầm giả ca	
17th (2011)	Direct-to-video	not awarded		
18th (2013)	Feature film	Trương Minh Quốc Thái	Những người viết huyền thoại	
18th (2013)	Direct-to-video	Huỳnh Đông	Người cộng sự	
19th (2015)	Feature film	Trung Anh	Những đứa con của làng	
19th (2015)	Direct-to-video	not awarded		
20th (2017)	Feature film	Quý Bình	Bao giờ có yêu nhau	
21st (2019)	Feature film	Trấn Thành	Cua lại vợ bầu	
22nd (2021)	Feature film	Tuấn Trần	Bố già	
23rd (2023)	Feature film	Thái Hoà	Con nhót mót chồng	

== Notes ==
At the 10th Vietnam Film Festival, there was an acting award given to the children cast of the children feature film Cát bụi hè đường.
