= Best Actress Award (Vietnam Film Festival) =

Best Actress Award (Vietnamese: Giải nữ diễn viên chính xuất sắc) is one of the awards presented at the Vietnam Film Festival to recognize an actress with the performance which has been determined the best by the juries of feature film and direct-to-video categories.

== History ==
The category was awarded for the first time in the 2nd Vietnam Film Festival (1973). Trà Giang, Minh Châu, Hồng Ánh and Lê Khanh are all holding the record in this category with two awards. Thu Hà was also awarded two but one of them is for the role in a direct-to-video feature film.

The achievement in a direct-to-video feature film, which was first awarded in the 9th Vietnam Film Festival (1990), is no longer awarded since the 20th Vietnam Film Festival (2017). It is because this category has been removed.

== Awards ==
| Festival | Category | Winner | Film | Notes |
|---|---|---|---|---|
| 1st (1970) | not awarded | | | |
| 2nd (1973) | Feature film | Tuệ Minh | Truyện vợ chồng anh Lực | |
| 3rd (1975) | Feature film | Như Quỳnh | Đến hẹn lại lên | |
| 4th (1977) | Feature film | Thanh Tú | Sao tháng Tám | |
| 4th (1977) | Feature film | Trà Giang | Ngày lễ Thánh | |
| 5th (1980) | Feature film | Phương Thanh | Tội lỗi cuối cùng | |
| 5th (1980) | Feature film | Thùy Liên | Mùa gió chướng, Vùng đất Củ Chi | |
| 6th (1983) | Feature film | Diệu Thuần | Ngày ấy bên sông Lam, Trở về Sam Sao | |
| 6th (1983) | Feature film | Hương Xuân | Về nơi gió cát | |
| 6th (1983) | Feature film | Mộng Tuyền | Tình yêu của em | |
| 7th (1985) | Feature film | Lê Vân | Bao giờ cho đến tháng Mười | |
| 7th (1985) | Feature film | Thụy Vân | Xa và gần | |
| 7th (1985) | Feature film | Thanh Quý | Tình yêu và khoảng cách | |
| 8th (1988) | Feature film | Trà Giang (2) | Huyền thoại về người mẹ, Thủ lĩnh áo nâu | |
| 8th (1988) | Feature film | Minh Châu | Cô gái trên sông | |
| 9th (1990) | Feature film | Minh Châu (2) | Người đàn bà nghịch cát | |
| 9th (1990) | Feature film | Hoàng Cúc | Tướng về hưu | |
| 9th (1990) | Direct-to-video | Thu Hà | Lá ngọc cành vàng | |
| 10th (1993) | Feature film | Thu Hà (2) | Canh bạc | |
| 10th (1993) | Feature film | Lê Khanh | Chuyện tình bên dòng sông | |
| 10th (1993) | Direct-to-video | Mỹ Duyên | Tình nhỏ làm sao quên, Băng qua bóng tối | |
| 11th (1996) | Feature film | Chiều Xuân | Người yêu đi lấy chồng | |
| 11th (1996) | Feature film | Lê Vi | Cây bạch đàn vô danh | |
| 11th (1996) | Direct-to-video | Ngọc Hiệp | Giữa dòng | |
| 12th (1999) | Feature film | not awarded | | |
| 12th (1999) | Direct-to-video | not awarded | | |
| 13th (2001) | Feature film | Hồng Ánh | Đời cát, Thung lũng hoang vắng | |
| 13th (2001) | Direct-to-video | Diễm Lộc | Nắng chiều | |
| 14th (2005) | Feature film | Hồng Ánh (2) | Người đàn bà mộng du | |
| 14th (2005) | Direct-to-video | Thanh Thúy | Mùa sen | |
| 15th (2007) | Feature film | Đỗ Thị Hải Yến | Chuyện của Pao | |
| 15th (2007) | Feature film | Ngô Thanh Vân | Dòng máu anh hùng | |
| 15th (2007) | Direct-to-video | not awarded | | |
| 16th (2009) | Feature film | Đỗ Nguyễn Lan Hà | Trái tim bé bỏng | |
| 16th (2009) | Direct-to-video | Hoàng Lan | 13 bến nước | |
| 17th (2011) | Feature film | Ninh Dương Lan Ngọc | Cánh đồng bất tận | |
| 17th (2011) | Feature film | Nguyễn Mỹ Hạnh | Vũ điệu đam mê | |
| 17th (2011) | Direct-to-video | not awarded | | |
| 18th (2013) | Feature film | Vân Trang | Scandal: Bí mật thảm đỏ | |
| 18th (2013) | Feature film | Tăng Bảo Quyên | Những người viết huyền thoại | |
| 18th (2013) | Direct-to-video | Takei Emi | Người cộng sự | |
| 19th (2015) | Feature film | Thúy Hằng | Những đứa con của làng, Cuộc đời của Yến | |
| 19th (2015) | Direct-to-video | Nguyễn Thu Thủy | Đất lành | |
| 20th (2017) | Feature film | Kaity Nguyễn | Em chưa 18 | |
| 21st (2019) | Feature film | Hoàng Yến Chibi | Tháng năm rực rỡ | |
| 22nd (2021) | Feature film | Lê Khanh (2) | Gái già lắm chiêu V: Những cuộc đời vương giả | |
| 23rd (2023) | Feature film | Mai Cát Vi | Mẹ ơi, Bướm đây! | |
| 23rd (2023) | Feature film | Đinh Y Nhung | Mẹ ơi, Bướm đây! | |

== Notes ==
There are also a number of times in the festival's history that a lead actress was awarded the 'Prospective Acting' award because she didn't score enough to win the 'Best Actress' award.

- Thanh Quý received 'Commendable Acting' for her role in feature film Chuyến xe bão táp at the 4th Vietnam Film Festival (1977)
- Ngọc Bích received the 'Prospective Acting' award for her role in feature film Cuộc chia tay không hẹn trước at the 8th Vietnam Film Festival (1988)
- Hồng Ánh received 'Prospective Acting' for her role in direct-to-video feature film Cầu thang tối at the 12th Vietnam Film Festival (1999)
