= Best Director Award (Vietnam Film Festival) =

Best Director Award (Vietnamese: Giải đạo diễn xuất sắc) is one of the awards presented at the Vietnam Film Festival to recognize a filmmaker with the achievement in directing which has been determined the best by the juries of feature film, direct-to-video, documentary film and animated film categories.

== History ==
The category was awarded for the first time in the 2nd Vietnam Film Festival (1973). Đặng Nhật Minh, Đào Trọng Khánh and Phạm Minh Trí are all holding the record with three awards. They respectively represents their categories 'Feature film', 'Documentary film' and 'Animated film'. Director Nguyễn Hoàng Lâm was also awarded three but two of them is for the science films and the other is for a documentary.

The achievement in a direct-to-video feature film, which was first awarded in the 9th Vietnam Film Festival (1990), is no longer awarded since the 20th Vietnam Film Festival (2017). It is because this category has been removed.

== Awards ==
Festival	Category	Winner	Film	Notes
1st (1970)	not awarded			
2nd (1973)	Feature film	Bùi Đình Hạc	Đường về quê mẹ	
2nd (1973)	Feature film	Trần Vũ	Truyện vợ chồng anh Lực	
2nd (1973)	Feature film	Phạm Kỳ Nam	Tiền tuyến gọi	
2nd (1973)	Documentary film	Ngọc Quỳnh	Lũy thép Vĩnh Linh	
2nd (1973)	Science film	Lương Đức	Chú ý! Thuốc trừ sâu	
3rd (1975)	Feature film	Trần Vũ (2)	Đến hẹn lại lên	
3rd (1975)	Animated film	Hồ Quảng	Con khỉ lạc loài	
4th (1977)	Feature film	Nguyễn Khắc Lợi	Hai người mẹ	
4th (1977)	Documentary film	Phạm Kỳ Nam (2)	Miền Nam trong trái tim tôi	
4th (1977)	Animated film	Hồ Quảng (2), Nguyễn Thị Nghiêm Dung	Con kiến và hạt gạo	
5th (1980)	Feature film	Nguyễn Hồng Sến	Cánh đồng hoang, Mùa gió chướng	
5th (1980)	Feature film	Hải Ninh	Mối tình đầu	
5th (1980)	Documentary film	Trần Văn Thủy	Phản bội	
5th (1980)	Science film	Nguyễn Như Ái	Ong mắt đỏ	
5th (1980)	Animated film	Phạm Minh Trí	Giải Nhất thuộc về ai	
6th (1983)	Feature film	Trần Phương	Hy vọng cuối cùng	
6th (1983)	Documentary film	Lê Mạnh Thích	Đường dây lên sông Đà	
6th (1983)	Documentary film	Nguyễn Vũ Đức	20 năm sau	
6th (1983)	Animated film	Đặng Hiền	Giai điệu, Chú gà trống choai	
7th (1985)	Feature film	Đặng Nhật Minh	Bao giờ cho đến tháng Mười	
7th (1985)	Feature film	Huy Thành	Xa và gần	
7th (1985)	Documentary film	Đào Trọng Khánh	Việt Nam - Hồ Chí Minh, 1/50 giây cuộc đời	
7th (1985)	Animated film	Phạm Minh Trí (2)	Diều hâu	
7th (1985)	Animated film	Hồ Đắc Vũ	Câu hỏi bất ngờ	
8th (1988)	Feature film	Xuân Sơn	Truyện cổ tích cho tuổi mười bảy	
8th (1988)	Feature film	Lê Đức Tiến	Thằng Bờm	
8th (1988)	Children feature film	Anh Thái	Khi vắng bà	
8th (1988)	Documentary film	Trần Văn Thủy	Hà Nội trong mắt ai	
8th (1988)	Animated film	Lê Thanh	Dũng sĩ Đam Dông	
9th (1990)	Feature film	Việt Linh	Gánh xiếc rong	
9th (1990)	Animated film	Bảo Quang	Mèo và chuột	
10th (1993)	Feature film	Lê Xuân Hoàng	Vị đắng tình yêu	
10th (1993)	Feature film	Lưu Trọng Ninh	Hãy tha thứ cho em, Canh bạc	
10th (1993)	Children feature film	Nguyễn Khánh Dư	Bọn trẻ	
10th (1993)	Direct-to-video feature	Lê Hoàng Hoa	Tình nhỏ làm sao quên	
10th (1993)	Animated film	Phạm Minh Trí (3)	Ông tướng canh đền	
11th (1996)	Feature film	Đặng Nhật Minh (2)	Thương nhớ đồng quê	
11th (1996)	Direct-to-video feature	Trần Mỹ Hà	Giữa dòng	
11th (1996)	Documentary film	Thanh An, Đào Trọng Khánh (2)	Hồ Chí Minh với Trung Quốc	
11th (1996)	Science film	Phạm Khắc	Khi đàn sếu trở về	
12th (1999)	Feature film	Đặng Nhật Minh (3)	Hà Nội mùa đông năm 46	
12th (1999)	Direct-to-video feature	Đào Bá Sơn	Cầu thang tối	
12th (1999)	Direct-to-video feature	Vũ Châu	Cha tôi và hai người đàn bà	
12th (1999)	Documentary film	Lê Mạnh Thích (2)	Trở lại Ngư Thủy	
12th (1999)	Documentary film	Trần Văn Thủy (2)	Tiếng vĩ cầm ở Mỹ Lai	
13th (2001)	Feature film	Nguyễn Thanh Vân	Đời cát	
13th (2001)	Direct-to-video feature	Nguyễn Khải Hưng	301	
13th (2001)	Documentary film	Văn Lê	Di chúc của những oan hồn	
13th (2001)	Animated film	Nguyễn Phương Hoa	Xe đạp	
14th (2004)	Feature film	Nguyễn Thanh Vân (2)	Người đàn bà mộng du	
14th (2004)	Direct-to-video feature	Võ Tấn Bình	Mùa sen	
14th (2004)	Documentary film	Lê Hồng Chương	Thang đá ngược ngàn	
14th (2004)	Animated film	Nguyễn Phương Hoa (2)	Chuyện về những đôi giày	
15th (2007)	Feature film	Nguyễn Võ Nghiêm Minh	Mùa len trâu	
15th (2007)	Documentary film	Đào Trọng Khánh (3)	Lửa thiêng	
15th (2007)	Science film	Nguyễn Văn Hướng	Sự sống ở rừng Cúc Phương	
16th (2009)	Feature film	Bùi Thạc Chuyên	Chơi vơi	
16th (2009)	Direct-to-video feature	Đặng Thái Huyền	13 bến nước	
16th (2009)	Documentary film	Lê Hồng Chương (2)	Ký ức Trường Sơn	
16th (2009)	Animated film	Huỳnh Vĩnh Sơn	Thỏ và Rùa	
17th (2011)	Feature film	Vũ Ngọc Đãng	Hot boy nổi loạn và câu chuyện về thằng Cười, cô gái điếm và con vịt	
17th (2011)	Documentary film	Lưu Quỳ	Hoàng Sa trong lòng tổ quốc	
17th (2011)	Science film	Trịnh Quang Tùng, Bùi Thị Phương Thảo	Bướm - Côn trùng cánh vảy	
17th (2011)	Animated film	Phạm Hồng Sơn	Chiếc lá	
18th (2013)	Feature film	Victor Vu	Scandal: Bí mật thảm đỏ, Thiên mệnh anh hùng	
18th (2013)	Direct-to-video feature	Trần Trung Dũng	Nước mắt người cha	
18th (2013)	Documentary film	Nguyễn Mộng Long, Uông Thị Hạnh	Có một cơ hội bị bỏ lỡ	
18th (2013)	Science film	Nguyễn Hoàng Lâm	Bí mật từ những pho tượng Phật	
18th (2013)	Animated film	Trần Khánh Duyên	Bò vàng	
19th (2015)	Feature film	Victor Vu (2)	Tôi thấy hoa vàng trên cỏ xanh	
19th (2015)	Direct-to-video feature	Đặng Thái Huyền	Đất lành	
19th (2015)	Documentary film	Đào Thanh Tùng	Triết gia Trần Đức Thảo suy tư cùng thế kỷ	
19th (2015)	Science film	Nguyễn Hoàng Lâm (2)	Bản hòa tấu Sơn Đoòng	
19th (2015)	Animated film	Phùng Văn Hà	Cậu bé cờ lau	
20th (2017)	Feature film	Vũ Ngọc Đãng (2)	Hot boy nổi loạn 2	
20th (2017)	Documentary film	Nguyễn Hoàng Lâm (3)	Sống và kể lại	
20th (2017)	Science film	Phùng Ngọc Tú	Một giải pháp chống xói lở bờ biển	
20th (2017)	Animated film	Trịnh Lâm Tùng	Một lần đào ngũ	
21st (2019)	Feature film	Leon Quang Lê	Song Lang	
21st (2019)	Documentary film	Trần Tuấn Hiệp	Ở nơi cửa ngõ Hoàng Sa, Ông Hai Lúa, Thanh niên cứu quốc thành Hoàng Diệu	
21st (2019)	Animated film	Vũ Duy Khánh	Vầng sáng ấm áp	
22nd (2021)	Feature film	Trịnh Đình Lê Minh	Bằng chứng vô hình	
22nd (2021)	Documentary film	Tạ Quỳnh Tư	Ranh giới, Nẻo đường hội ngộ	
22nd (2021)	Science film	Trịnh Quang Tùng (2)	Lũ miền núi	
22nd (2021)	Animated film	Trần Khánh Duyên (2)	Con chim gỗ	
23rd (2023)	Feature film	Bùi Thạc Chuyên (2)	Glorious Ashes	
23rd (2023)	Documentary film	Hà Lệ Diễm	Children of the Mist	
23rd (2023)	Science film	Nguyễn Thu	Đất ô nhiễm	
23rd (2023)	Animated film	Nguyễn Quang Trung	Nụ cười	

== Notes ==
- In some cases, the 'Best Director' award was considered by the jury as an alternative to the Golden Lotus award, which awarded to Best Film, such as the case of director Đặng Nhật Minh with the film "Thương nhớ đồng quê" at the 11th Vietnam Film Festival (1996).
- Before the 15th Vietnam Film Festival (2007), Documentary film and Science film were counted as one category for judging and grading.
