= Golden Lotus Prize (Vietnam Film Festival) =

Bông sen vàng (Golden Lotus)
- Awarded for: Best Film
- Country: Vietnam
- Presented by: Vietnam Film Festival
- First award: 1970

The Golden Lotus (Vietnamese: Bông sen vàng) is the highest prize awarded to competing films at the Vietnam Film Festival. The award is separated in different categories: feature film; direct-to-video; documentary film; science film and animated film. The Golden Lotus is awarded for one or several films which are chosen by the jury of each category as the best production of the festival. It is also possible that the prize is not awarded if the jury decides that no film at the festival deserves the Golden Lotus.

== History ==
The first Vietnamese film festival was organized in order to encourage the work of composing and honor the outstanding works of Vietnamese artists in cinema field. Awards include Golden Lotus, Silver Lotus and Certificate of Merit. The Golden Lotus Medal was then designed with the image of a Golden lotus along with the name of the winning film carved in a circular shape of gilded metal, placed in a rectangular lacquer box lined with a purple-blue velvet fabric. From the jury to the award-winning artist, no one received any monetary remuneration as well as material gifts, only such symbolic medals.

From the first to the eighth festival, the Golden Lotus was awarded in three systems: feature films, documentary/science films and animated films.

From the sixth to the tenth festival, feature film for children was combined with animated film into children/animated film section, judging by the same jury.

Since the 9th film festival, the organizers have opened an additional entry for direct-to-video feature films. This section was later dropped starting at the 20th festival due to the outdated film format.

Starting from the 15th film festival, documentary film and scientific films were separated into two separate awarding systems, although still sharing the same jury.

== Awards ==
The following films received the Golden Lotuses of the Vietnam Film Festival:

Festival	Feature film	Direct-to-video feature | Science film		Documentary film	Animated film
(1953 - 1965)	On the Same River; The Passerine Bird; The Young Woman of Bai-Sao; Two Soldiers	not awarded		12 documentary films	Đáng đời thằng Cáo
I	Young Soldier; Nguyễn Văn Trỗi; Rising Storm	not awarded		24 documentary films	Con sáo biết nói Mèo con
II	My Homeland, My Country; The Story of Lực and His Wife	Chú ý! Thuốc trừ sâu		14 documentary films	Chuyện ông Gióng; Kặm Phạ - Nàng Ngà
III	We'll Be Seeing Us Again; Girl from Hanoi	not awarded		Hà Nội - Bản anh hùng ca	Con khỉ lạc loài
IV	The August Star	not awarded		Chiến thắng lịch sử Xuân 1975; Thành phố lúc rạng đông	not awarded
V	The Abandoned Field: Free Fire Zone; Somebody Who We Met; When Mother's Away	not awarded		Đường về Tổ quốc Nguyễn Ái Quốc đến với Lênin; Phản bội	Ông Trạng thả diều Dế Mèn phiêu lưu ký
VI	City Under the Fist; Back to the Sand Village	Đất Tổ nghìn xưa		Cuộc đụng đầu lịch sử Đường dây lên sông Đà; Những chặng đường cách mạng vẻ vang	Cái mũ của vịt con Giai điệu Âu Cơ - Lạc Long Quân
VII	When the Tenth Month Comes; Far and Near	not awarded		1/50 giây cuộc đời Người Công giáo huyện Thống Nhất; Tiếng nổ định hướng Việt Nam - Hồ Chí Minh	not awarded
VIII	Brothers; Fairytale for 17-Year-Olds	Cánh kiến đỏ		Hanoi Through Whose Eyes?	Dũng sĩ Đam Đông; Sáng
IX	not awarded	not awarded		Hồ Chí Minh: Chân dung một con người Hồ Chí Minh: Hình ảnh của Người	not awarded
X	The Bitterness of Love; The Kids (Note: Counted as a film in the Children section)	not awarded		Đi tìm đồng đội	not awarded
XI	not awarded	Giữa dòng	Một số loài ong mật ở Việt Nam; Lời cảnh báo của biển	Đường mòn trên biển Đông; Hồ Chí Minh với Trung Quốc	not awarded
XII	The Girls at Dong Loc Crossroads	not awarded		Returning to Ngu Thuy; Cánh chim không mỏi	not awarded
XIII	Sandy Lives; The Guava House	301		Chị Năm "khùng" Di chúc của những oan hồn	Xe đạp Sự tích cái nhà sàn
XIV	Sleep-walking Woman	Mùa sen		Thang đá ngược ngàn	Chuyện về những đôi giày
XV	Hanoi, Hanoi	Sự sống ở rừng Cúc Phương		not awarded	not awarded
XVI	Don't Burn	13 bến nước	Nước ngầm cảnh báo	Đất lạnh	Thỏ và Rùa
XVII	not awarded	Bướm - Côn trùng cánh vẩy		Hoàng Sa trong lòng tổ quốc Hồ Chí Minh - Cội nguồn cảm hứng sáng tạo	Chiếc lá
XVIII	The Legend Makers; Scandal	The Partner	Bí mật từ những pho tượng Phật	Có một cơ hội bị bỏ lỡ	Bò vàng
XIX	Yellow Flowers on the Green Grass	Bản hòa tấu Sơn Đoòng		Đỉnh cao chiến thắng	Cậu bé cờ lau
XX	Jailbait	Một giải pháp chống xói lở bờ biển		Sống và kể lại	Cậu bé Ma-nơ-canh
XXI	Song Lang	not awarded		Chông chênh	Người anh hùng áo vải
XXII	Dreamy Eyes	Điểm mù giao thông		Ranh giới	Con chim gỗ
XXIII	Glorious Ashes	Nghiên cứu về ứng dụng công nghệ trong chữa cháy		Children of the Mist	Giấc mơ của con

== Multiple winners ==
The following directors received the Golden Lotus for Best Feature Film more than one time:

- Đặng Nhật Minh: 4 times
- Trần Vũ: 3 times
- Victor Vu: 3 times
- Huy Thành: 2 times
- Nguyễn Thanh Vân: 2 times

== See also ==
- Golden Kite Awards, also known as the Vietnam Cinema Association Awards
