= The Partner (2013 film) =

- Poster
- Screenplay by: Junnichiro Taniguchi
- Directed by: Jun Muto
- Starring: Noriyuki Higashiyama; Huỳnh Đông; Emi Takei; Bình Minh
- Music by: Koji Endo
- Countries of origin: Japan; Vietnam
- Original languages: Japanese; Vietnamese

Production
- Producers: Tsuyoshi Katayama; Đỗ Thanh Hải; Masato Endo
- Cinematography: Nguyễn Mai Hiền
- Running time: 123 minutes
- Production companies: Tokyo Broadcasting System Television; Vietnam Television

Original release
- Release: September 29, 2013

The Partner (Vietnamese: Người cộng sự; Japanese: The Partner ～愛しき百年の友へ, romanized: Za Pātonā ~ itoshiki hyakunen no tomo e ~) is a 2013 Japanese-Vietnamese historical telefilm based on the true story of the Vietnamese independence fighter Phan Bội Châu and his Japanese friend Asaba Sakitaro. The film aired on September 29, 2013 on Vietnam Television in Vietnam and Tokyo Broadcasting System Television in Japan.

== Cast ==
=== Meiji era ===
- Noriyuki Higashiyama as Asaba Sakitaro
- Huỳnh Đông as Phan Bội Châu
- Bình Minh as Cường Để
- Emi Takei as Oiwa Akane
- Kazue Fukiishi as Asaba Masa
- Hồng Đăng as Trần Đông Phong
- Tetsuya Takeda as Inukai Tsuyoshi
- Akira Emoto as Ōkuma Shigenobu

=== 21st century ===
- Noriyuki Higashiyama as Tetsuya Suzuki
- Huỳnh Đông as Nguyễn Thành Nam
- Mana Ashida as Sakura Suzuki
- Lan Phương as Lê Hồng Liên
- Yuichi Nakamaru as Noriaki Hatakeyama
- Yukiyo Toake as Machi Kinoshita

== Production ==
The film was produced in 2013 to mark 40 years of diplomatic relations between Japan and Vietnam. Filming took place in both countries from June to July 2013. Vietnamese actors Huỳnh Đông and Lan Phương had to learn Japanese for their roles.

== Awards ==
The Partner won five out of eight awards in the Direct-to-Video Film category at the 2013 Vietnam Film Festival.

Year	#	Award	Category	Individual	Result
2013	18th	Vietnam Film Festival	Golden Lotus Award		Won
2013	18th	Vietnam Film Festival	Best Actor Award	Huỳnh Đông	Won
2013	18th	Vietnam Film Festival	Best Actress Award	Emi Takei	Won
2013	18th	Vietnam Film Festival	Best Cinematography	Nguyễn Mai Hiền	Won
2013	18th	Vietnam Film Festival	Best Art Design	Trọng Tuân	Won
