= 16th Vietnam Film Festival =

Liên hoan phim Việt Nam lần thứ 16 (16th Vietnam Film Festival)
- Location: Ho Chi Minh City, Vietnam
- Founded: 1970
- Awards: Golden Lotus: Đừng đốt (Feature); 13 bến nước (Direct-to-video Feature); Đất lạnh (Documentary); Nước ngầm cảnh báo (Science); Thỏ và Rùa (Animated)
- Hosted by: Thanh Bạch, Hồng Phượng
- Festival date: December 8 - December 12, 2009
- Website: 16th Vietnam Film Festival

Vietnam Film Festival chronology
- 17th 15th

The 16th Vietnam Film Festival was held from December 8 to December 12, 2009 in Ho Chi Minh City, Vietnam, with the slogan "For a reformed and integrated Vietnam cinema" (Vietnamese: "Vì một nền điện ảnh Việt Nam đổi mới và hội nhập").

== Event ==
The 16th Vietnam Film Festival was a "reunion" with the public in Ho Chi Minh City since the 5th Vietnam Film Festival was held in 1983 in the city named after Uncle Ho. 2009 is also the 50th anniversary of the Vietnamese Revolutionary Cinema, so it was a festival for Vietnam's Cinema to review its development journey with successes achieved in the region and the world.

The opening ceremony of the Film Festival took place on the evening of December 8 at White Palace, broadcast on HTV7 channel. The closing ceremony on the evening of December 12 at Hòa Bình Theater, on HTV9 channel.

Public opinion praised this film festival for being professional in a number of stages: Organizing the voting for the most favorite movies of the audience, and seminars. The 16th Vietnam Film Festival also impressed with the "double" of the Golden Lotus and the director award for the film "Đừng đốt" by director Đặng Nhật Minh.

=== Participation ===
This year, the organizers extended to a maximum of 100% of feature films of all types (feature, documentary, science, animated) of all cinema establishments, produced after the 15th Vietnam Film Festival (November 2007) to the second half of October 2009, all were able to participate. This is intended to encourage movie establishments to produce more movies in theaters, to serve the public. Some studios sent two or three films to participate. Fifteen works with three film lines: State, private and films by overseas Vietnamese directors created a cinematic picture. The difference in quantity between public and private films is not significant.

Participating in the competition at the 16th Vietnam Film Festival, there were 99 cinematographic works from 29 film production facilities across the country. In which, there are 15 feature films, 11 direct-to-video feature films, 20 animated films and 53 documentaries - science films. 9 foreign film troupes from China, Japan, Korea, the US, Finland, Russia, Singapore, Laos and Cambodia attended and contributed ideas in seminars on short films, on mobilizing capital for film production. This showed the integration efforts of the country's cinema.

=== Jury ===
The organizers clearly define each film genre to have the best movie among the entries, so each film genre has won the Golden Lotus award: "Đừng đốt" (Feature film), "13 bến nước" (Direct-to-video Feature film), "Đất lạnh" (Documentary), "Nước ngầm cảnh báo" (Science film) and "Thỏ và Rùa" (Animated film).

The feature film jury had nine members: President of Vietnam Cinema Association Trần Luân Kim (Head), director Vũ Xuân Hưng, painter Phạm Quang Vĩnh, director Bùi Tuấn Dũng, composer Đặng Hữu Phúc, screenwriters Chu Lai and Văn Lê, cinematographer Hoàng Tấn Phát, actress Ngọc Hiệp. Direct-to-video feature film jury had seven members, led by director Xuân Sơn. Documentary - science film jury had seven members, led by director Lò Minh. The animated film jury had five members headed by director Đặng Hiền. For the first time at the National Film Festival, there was a press panel led by Trịnh Lê Văn - Head of the Department of Arts and Sciences of Vietnam Television.

This year, in addition to the traditional awards of the Film Festival, the organizers added the award category for the best feature film voted by the press into the award structure. This award is organized by the organizers in collaboration with the Press Department - Ministry of Information and Communications. Each judging journalist was given a briefcase containing information about the 15 films participating in the festival, the judging rules, paper for making comments, a pen and a flashlight (for viewing seats and reading documents).

The film festival continued to maintain the audience vote award, although this award is considered inaccurate, as the film that wins is often the most free-to-view film, not the best film in the opinion of the majority of the public. The award voted by the audience in this festival is recommended to use the form of ticket sales or online voting.

=== Activities ===
Movies were shown according to schedule at cinemas in Ho Chi Minh City: Thăng Long A, Đại Đồng, Đống Đa, Galaxy Nguyễn Du, Fafilm. The film "14 ngày phép" was the opening film for the cinema screenings at Thăng Long A theater from 9:30 a.m. on December 7. At the same time, at the cinemas of Fafilm, Đống Đa and Đại Đồng were screening films submitted to the festival in the genres of direct-to-video feature, documentary - science and animated. The movies were shown until the end of December 11 in 3 mornings, afternoons and evenings.

On the morning of December 8, movie artists came to offer flowers at Uncle Hồ's monument and the Film Fair opened at the Cultural Center of District 10. For the first time at the National Film Festival, the Film Fair activity was officially held with the name "Cinema with the Public" (Vietnamese: Điện ảnh với công chúng), paralleling almost the entire duration of the festival. This is a remarkable innovation because at film festivals around the world, festivals like Cannes, there are film fairs. The public had access to filmmakers and producers.

For Vietnamese and international film professionals, there were 3 seminars and talks on:

- "Short films in the context of international integration" (Vietnamese: "Phim ngắn trong bối cảnh hội nhập quốc tế")
- "Building projects and raising capital for film production" (Vietnamese: "Xây dựng dự án và huy động vốn sản xuất phim")
- "Introducing filmmaking with HD technology and mobile film projection" (Vietnamese: "Giới thiệu làm phim công nghệ HD và công tác chiếu phim lưu động")

=== Inadequacy ===
This Vietnam Film Festival does not have a festival space with a large square for flags to fly, for the public to meet and interact with artists. Artist Quyen Linh expressed regret that he did not have the opportunity to interact with the public on the opening night because the audience was separated by barriers from the artist. The opening night space of the festival was confined to the premises of the White Place convention center, with limited height, causing the images to be miniaturized, torn apart within the low wall and lost impression.

Because the stage space was too small to match the scale of the festival, the dance performance in the opening ceremony was staged very elaborately, but had the appearance of a performance. The catwalk nature of the opening night stage of the festival was enhanced when the girls, who were mostly models, appeared in a few dramas and walked around the stage as emerging movie actors, making viewers think of beauty contests.

Despite being held in a larger venue than the Hoa Binh Theater, the closing and award ceremony drew criticism for its logistical arrangements, which created difficulties for award recipients accessing the stage.

== Official Selection ==
=== Feature film ===
Original title	English title	Director(s)	Production
14 ngày phép	14 Days	Nguyễn Trọng Khoa	Chánh Phương Film
Chơi vơi	Adrift	Bùi Thạc Chuyên	Feature Film Studio I
Chuyện tình xa xứ	Passport to Love	Victor Vu	Wonderboy Entertainment
Duyên trần thoát tục		Lê Cung Bắc	Senafilm
Được sống		Lê Ngọc Linh	VFS
Đừng đốt	Don't Burn	Đặng Nhật Minh	Hodafilm
Em muốn làm người nổi tiếng		Nguyễn Đức Việt	Hodafilm
Giải cứu thần chết	Saving The Death	Nguyễn Quang Dũng	Galaxy Studio
Hoài vũ trắng		Đào Duy Phúc	Feature Film Studio I
Huyền thoại bất tử	The Legend Is Alive	Lưu Huỳnh	Phước Sang Film
Không cân sức	Unbalanced	Trần Ngọc Phong	Giải Phóng Film
Mười	Muoi: The Legend of a Portrait	Kim Tae-kyeong	Bily Pictures, Phước Sang Film
Rừng đen	Black Forest	Vương Đức	VFS
Trái tim bé bỏng	The Little Heart	Nguyễn Thanh Vân	VFS
Trăng nơi đáy giếng	The Moon at the Bottom of the Well	Nguyễn Vinh Sơn	Giải Phóng Film

Highlighted title indicates Golden Lotus winner.

== Awards ==
=== Feature film ===
Award		Winner
Film	Golden Lotus	Don't Burn
Film	Silver Lotus	The Moon at the Bottom of the Well; Black Forest
Film	Jury's Merit	The Little Heart; The Legend Is Alive
Film	Press Choice	Don't Burn
Film	Audience Choice	14 Days
Best Director		Bùi Thạc Chuyên – Adrift
Best Actor		Dustin Nguyễn – The Legend Is Alive
Best Actress		Đỗ Nguyễn Lan Hà – The Little Heart
Best Supporting Actor		Bình Minh – 14 Days
Best Supporting Actress		Hồng Ánh – The Little Heart
Best Screenplay		Đặng Nhật Minh – Don't Burn
Best Cinematography		Lý Thái Dũng – Adrift
Best Art Design		Lã Quý Tùng – Adrift
Best Original Score		Đức Trí – The Legend Is Alive

==== Direct-to-video ====
Award		Winner
Film	Golden Lotus	13 bến nước
Film	Silver Lotus	Đường đua Cây bán mệnh
Film	Jury's Merit	Mai Hạc; Ngôi nhà bí ẩn
Best Director		Đặng Thái Huyền – 13 bến nước
Best Actor		Trung Hiếu – 13 bến nước
Best Actress		Hoàng Lan – 13 bến nước
Best Supporting Actor		Chu Sơn Tùng – Âm sắc màn đêm
Best Supporting Actress		Tuyết Liên – 13 bến nước
Best Screenplay		Huy Thành – Đường đua
Best Cinematography		Trịnh Quang Tùng – 13 bến nước
Best Art Design		Lã Quý Tùng – Ngôi nhà bí ẩn
Best Original Score		Hoàng Lương – Âm sắc màn đêm

=== Documentary/Science film ===
==== Documentary film ====
Award		Winner
Film	Golden Lotus	Đất lạnh
Film	Silver Lotus	Đất tổ quê cha Những hy sinh thầm lặng
Film	Jury's Merit	Đám mây không dừng lại Tướng Đồng Sỹ Nguyên với Trường sơn huyền thoại
Best Director		Lê Hồng Chương – Ký ức Trường Sơn
Best Screenplay		Phan Huyền Thư – Chất xám
Best Cinematography		Nguyễn Quốc Thành – Đám mây không dừng lại

==== Science film ====
Award		Winner
Film	Golden Lotus	Nước ngầm cảnh báo
Film	Silver Lotus	Cá rạn san hô
Film	Jury's Merit	Nghệ thuật ngụy trang quân sự Rùa biển Việt Nam

=== Animated film ===
Award		Winner
Film	Golden Lotus	Thỏ và Rùa
Film	Silver Lotus	Ve Vàng và Dế Lửa; Bước nhảy của Châu Chấu
Film	Jury's Merit	Chim cút làm tổ Chuyện cổ Loa thành
Best Director		Huỳnh Vĩnh Sơn – Thỏ và Rùa
Best Screenplay		Huyền Vũ, Mỹ Linh – Thỏ và Rùa
Best Original Score		Hoàng Lương – Sự tích đảo Bà
