= The Town within Reach =

1983 Vietnamese film by Đặng Nhật Minh

- Directed by: Đặng Nhật Minh
- Written by: Đặng Nhật Minh
- Starring: Quế Hằng Tất Bình Văn Hòa
- Cinematography: Nguyễn Hữu Tuấn
- Edited by: Văn Linh
- Music by: Nguyễn Huy Căn Cát Vận Trịnh Công Sơn Hoàng Phủ Ngọc Tường
- Production company: Vietnam Feature Film Studio
- Release date: 1983
- Country: Vietnam
- Language: Vietnamese

The Town Within Reach (Vietnamese: Thị xã trong tầm tay) is a 1983 Vietnamese war film directed by Đặng Nhật Minh, set in the context of the Sino-Vietnamese War. Filmed on the ruin of the border town of Lạng Sơn after China's troops withdrew, the film deals with the themes of betrayal and grief and contains propaganda messages. It helped Đặng Nhật Minh establish his career, containing his signature narrative of a love story that talks on personal and national levels.

== Plot ==
On a moving train, Hanoi-based journalist Vũ recalled the day he arrived in the border town of Lang Son to write a report about the Sino-Vietnamese War that took place shortly before. Most Vietnamese people were evacuated, although there were dead bodies hanging or lying after being shot. Vũ wandered around the ghost town, taking pictures and remembering the last time he came here to visit his girlfriend's family. He left Thanh after knowing that her father migrated to the South in 1954, an event that raised suspicion of political "impurity." Vũ wanted to advance in his career; therefore, he did not want a "stain" in his profile. Later, it turned out that her father left home not for political purposes but for a love affair. Vũ was ashamed of his cowardice and wanted to reconnect with Thanh. Walking around the town made his wish even stronger. He met several people in the town, and a young woman from the militia informed him about the place to which Thanh was evacuated. He also met a Japanese journalist and witnessed his death due to a bullet in the back. Vũ thought of his betrayal and went to find Thanh to make amends, only to see that she had moved on with another man.

== Cast ==
- Quế Hằng as Thanh
- Tất Bình as Vũ
- Đặng Nhật Minh as Takano

== Production ==
After the Sino-Vietnamese War ended, Dang Nhat Minh visited the town of Lang Son. The aftermath of the war made him heartbroken and angry, encouraging him to write a short story named "The Town Within Reach." Around 1980, he wrote a short story called "The Town Within Reach." It was published in the Văn Nghệ (Literature and Arts) magazine and won a prize, making him think about giving up on filmmaking to become a writer. However, not long after that, he met a scholar and close friend of his uncle Nguyen Hong Phong. This person encouraged him to make a film out of his own story.

In August 1982, he and his film crew went to Lang Son to make the film. In his autobiography, he notes: "The town was in ruins, looking like a giant studio (for a war film) that one didn't need to stage it." Residents had not been allowed to return because mines are not entirely removed from the ground.

In the film, Dang Nhat Minh played the role of a Japanese journalist named Takano. He was a real person who died in Lang Son in March 1979. Dang Nhat Minh notes that he chose a Japanese student to play the role, but at the last minute, the Ministry of Foreign Affairs did not allow the student to go to a place that was still in a restless situation. It left Minh no other choice to play the role himself.

== Awards ==
The film won the Golden Lotus for Best Feature Film, the Award for Best Screenplay, and the Award for Best Cinematography at the 1983 Vietnam Film Festival. It was awarded the Hồ Chí Minh Prize in 2005.
