= Girl from Hanoi =

1974 film

- Caption of Film
- Directed by: Hải Ninh
- Written by: Hoàng Tích Chỉ; Hải Ninh; Vương Đan Hoàn
- Starring: Lan Hương; Thế Anh; Trà Giang; Kim Xuân; Quỳnh Anh; Hà Văn Trọng
- Cinematography: Trần Thế Dân
- Edited by: Lan Hoàng
- Music by: Hoàng Vân
- Production company: Vietnam Feature Film Studio
- Distributed by: The Criterion Channel
- Release date: 1974
- Running time: 72–90 minutes depending on cut
- Country: North Vietnam
- Language: Vietnamese

Girl from Hanoi (Vietnamese: Em bé Hà Nội), also called The Little Girl from Hanoi, is a 1974 Vietnamese drama film directed by Hải Ninh. It was entered into the 9th Moscow International Film Festival where it won a Diploma. It also won the Golden Lotus at the 3rd Vietnam Film Festival. It has also been described as docufiction and propaganda .

== Plot ==
The plot of the film revolves around a young girl searching for her father, a soldier in the PAVN, after her mother and sister are killed during Christmas Bombings. The film makes significant use of visual imagery and depicts war-time life in Hanoi under the aegis of the most intense sustained bombing campaign during the war. TOE.

== Cast ==
- Thế Anh
- Xuan Kim
- Lan Huong Nguyen
- Tu Thanh
- Tra Giang

== Production ==
After surviving the Operation Linebacker II bombing campaigns in December 1972, director Hải Ninh vowed to make a film to remember the dead, stating “I consider the film to be a memorial, a wreath to pay tribute to the souls of the dead.” The campaign was designed to destroy North Vietnamese morale and force them into submission.

The film is set during Operation Linebacker II (December 1972) during the Vietnam War, and extensive use of war-time scenery is used depicting Hanoi. The film was recorded on 35 mm.

== See also ==
- Vietnam War in film
