= 2nd Vietnam Film Festival =

Liên hoan phim Việt Nam lần thứ 2 (2nd Vietnam Film Festival)
- Location: Hanoi, Vietnam
- Founded: 1970
- Awards: Golden Lotus: 1953 - 1965: Chung một dòng sông (Feature) Con chìm vành khuyên (Feature) Chị Tư Hậu (Feature) Hai người lính (Feature) 12 documentary films Đáng đời thằng Cáo (Animated); 1969 - 1973: Đường về quê mẹ (Feature) Truyện vợ chồng anh Lực (Feature) 15 documentary films Chuyện ông Gióng (Animated) Kặm Phạ - Nàng Ngà (Animated)
- Festival date: February 28 - March 15, 1973
- Website: 2nd Vietnam Film Festival

Vietnam Film Festival chronology
- 3rd 1st

The 2nd Vietnam Film Festival was held from February 28 to March 15, 1973, in Hanoi, Vietnam, with the slogan "For the Fatherland and Socialism" (Vietnamese: "Vì Tổ quốc và chủ nghĩa xã hội").

== Event ==
This is the Film Festival to celebrate the 20th Anniversary of the Vietnam Revolutionary Cinema (1953 - 1973). Therefore, the Golden Lotus is awarded under two systems: films produced from 1953 to 1965 and films produced from 1969 to 1973 (before and after the time that was counted for the 1st Vietnam Film Festival in 1970). With 87 films participating in the Film Festival, 36 Golden Lotuses were awarded in the categories: Feature Film (6 films), Documentary Film (27 films), Animated Film (3 films). For the first time, there are awards to individuals such as director, actor/actress, screenplay, etc.

As for the prize, the recipient is given an extra fountain pen.

== Awards for the 20th Anniversary of Vietnam Revolutionary Cinema ==
=== Feature film ===
Award		Winner
Film	Golden Lotus	Chung một dòng sông Con chim vành khuyên Chị Tư Hậu; Hai người lính
Film	Silver Lotus	Lửa trung tuyến Vợ chồng A Phủ; Kim Đồng
Best Cinematography		Nguyễn Đăng Bảy – Con chim vành khuyên Nguyễn Khánh Dư – Chị Tư Hậu

=== Documentary/Science film ===
Award		Winner
Film	Golden Lotus	Chiến thắng Điện Biên Phủ; Chiến thắng Tây Bắc; Chống hạn; Dưới cờ quyết thắng; Điện Biên Phủ; Giữ làng giữ nước; Ngọn lửa Nghệ Tĩnh; Như đón cả 14 triệu đồng bào miền Nam anh hùng; Nước về Bắc Hưng Hải; Trên hải phận Tổ quốc; Trung đoàn bộ binh tăng cường tấn công quân địch phòng ngự có chuẩn bị sẵn; Vài hình ảnh về đời hoạt động của Hồ Chủ Tịch
Film	Silver Lotus	Bèo hoa dâu; Chiến dịch Cầu Kè; Chiến dịch Cao-Lạng; Diệt dốt; Dưới mái trường mới; Đại hội chiến sĩ thi đua lần thứ nhất; Đất và nước; Gang thép rực lửa; Hưng Yên nước bạc cơm vàng; Lửa căm thù; Mười năm thắng lợi; Nam Bắc một lòng; Tiếng hát trên đỉnh núi; Trai thôn Thượng, gái thôn Bạt; Trận La Bang; Trên thao trường; Trên tuyến đầu miền Tây Tổ quốc
Best Cinematography		Tô Cương – Như đón cả 14 triệu đồng bào miền Nam anh hùng

=== Animated film ===
Award		Winner
Film	Golden Lotus	Đáng đời thằng Cáo
Film	Silver Lotus	Chiếc vòng bạc
Best Animator		Trương Qua, Hồ Quảng – Đáng đời thằng Cáo

== Awards for the 2nd Vietnam Film Festival ==
=== Feature film ===
Award		Winner
Film	Golden Lotus	Đường về quê mẹ Truyện vợ chồng anh Lực
Film	Silver Lotus	Tiền tuyến gọi Trần Quốc Toản ra quân Vĩ tuyến 17 ngày và đêm
Best Director		Bùi Đình Hạc – Đường về quê mẹ Trần Vũ – Truyện vợ chồng anh Lực; Phạm Kỳ Nam – Tiền tuyến gọi
Best Actor		Huy Công – Ga
Best Actress		Tuệ Minh – Truyện vợ chồng anh Lực
Best Screenplay		Bành Châu, Bùi Đình Hạc – Đường về quê mẹ Vũ Lê Mai – Truyện vợ chồng anh Lực
Best Cinematography		Lưu Xuân Thư – Đường về quê mẹ
Best Art Design		Đào Đức – Trần Quốc Toản ra quân

=== Documentary/Science film ===
Award		Winner
Film	Golden Lotus	Chiến thắng đường 9 - Nam Lào; Chú ý! Thuốc trừ sâu; Chúng con nhớ Bác; Ghi chép trên đồng bằng Quảng Ngãi; Hình ảnh quân đội số 8 - 1971; Hồ chứa nước Mẫu Sơn; Kỹ thuật Mỹ và tội ác diệt chủng; Làng nhỏ bên sông Trà; Lũy thép Vĩnh Linh; Những người săn thú trên núi Đaksao; Những cô gái C3 quân giải phóng; Những cô gái Ngư Thủy; Mừng chiến công vĩ đại; Trận địa mặt đường; Vài hình ảnh chiến đấu đầu xuân 1968
Film	Silver Lotus	Bác Hồ của chúng em (Thời sự thiếu nhi số 3 – 1969); Chặng đường phía Nam; Chế biến sắn; Đường chúng tôi đi; Kôkava; Kỷ niệm 100 năm ngày sinh Lê-nin; Lên thăm Mù Cang Chải; Người thấy giáo thương binh; Người Pakô; Nhà máy thông tin quân đội tiến công vào khoa học kỹ thuật; Những cô gái trạm thông tin K6; Những người dân quê tôi; Quảng Trị ngày đầu giải phóng; Quân dân Trị-Thiên tấn công và nổi dậy; San bằng cao điểm 935; Thành phố những ngày đầu giải phóng; Theo chân người chiến sỹ an ninh giải phóng; Trở về buôn rẫy; Từ trận đầu đánh thắng; Xin chớ coi thường
Best Director		Ngọc Quỳnh – Lũy thép Vĩnh Linh; Lương Đức – Chú ý! Thuốc trừ sâu
Best Cinematography		Ma Cường, Kim Môn – Lũy thép Vĩnh Linh; Phạm Tiến Đạt – Kôkava; Lò Minh – Những cô gái Ngư Thủy

=== Animated film ===
Award		Winner
Film	Golden Lotus	Chuyện ông Gióng; Kặm Phạ - Nàng Ngà
Film	Silver Lotus	Sơn Tinh, Thủy Tinh; Gà trống hoa mơ
Film	Jury's Merit	Lời đáng yêu nhất
Best Animator		not awarded
