= 3rd Vietnam Film Festival =

Liên hoan phim Việt Nam lần thứ 3 (3rd Vietnam Film Festival)
- Location: Haiphong, Vietnam
- Founded: 1970
- Awards: Golden Lotus: Đến hẹn lại lên (Feature); Em bé Hà Nội (Feature); Hà Nội - Bản anh hùng ca (Documentary); Con khỉ lạc loài (Animated)
- Festival date: March 15 - March 25, 1975
- Website: 3rd Vietnam Film Festival

Vietnam Film Festival chronology
- 4th 2nd

The 3rd Vietnam Film Festival was held from March 15 to March 25, 1975 in Haiphong, Vietnam, with the slogan: "For the Fatherland and Socialism. For the development of national cinema." (Vietnamese: "Vì Tổ quốc và Chủ nghĩa xã hội. Vì sự phát triển của nền điện ảnh dân tộc").

== Event ==
This is the first film festival where films are shown to a large audience, also artists can meet and interact with the public. The total number of films registered for the competition is 111, including 4 feature films: "Em bé Hà Nội", "Quê nhà", "Đến hẹn lại lên", "Bài ca ra trận". In addition, there are 27 documentaries, 13 animated films, 43 news-themed films, 8 science films and 9 science-themed films.

In the end, 4 Golden Lotuses were awarded for the following categories: Feature Film (2 films), Documentary Film (1 film), Animated Film (1 film). Compared to the previous two film festivals, the number of awards in this period is much less, possibly because the organization and grading of awards has become more methodical.

== Awards ==
=== Feature film ===
Award		Winner
Film	Golden Lotus	Đến hẹn lại lên Em bé Hà Nội
Film	Silver Lotus	Bài ca ra trận
Best Director		Trần Vũ – Đến hẹn lại lên
Best Actor		not awarded
Best Actress		Như Quỳnh – Đến hẹn lại lên
Best Cinematography		Nguyễn Đăng Bảy – Đến hẹn lại lên
Best Art Design		Trần Kiềm – Em bé Hà Nội

=== Documentary/Science film ===
Award		Winner
Film	Golden Lotus	Hà Nội - Bản anh hùng ca
Film	Silver Lotus	Bắn rơi máy bay lên thẳng bằng súng bộ binh Mở đường Trường Sơn; Tội ác tột cùng bị trừng trị đích đáng Hà Nội 5 ngày đọ sức Vì âm thanh cuộc sống
Best Cinematography		Lương Đức – Vì âm thanh cuộc sống

=== Animated film ===
Award		Winner
Film	Golden Lotus	Con khỉ lạc loài
Film	Silver Lotus	Rừng hoa
Best Director		Hồ Quảng – Con khỉ lạc loài
Best Screenplay		Cao Thụy, Trần Ngọc Thanh – Con khỉ lạc loài
Best Animator		Hồ Quảng – Con khỉ lạc loài Mai Long – Mầm lá xanh
Best Cinematography		Nguyễn Thị Hằng – Con khỉ lạc loài
