= 11th Vietnam Film Festival =

Liên hoan phim Việt Nam lần thứ 11 (11th Vietnam Film Festival)
- Location: Hanoi, Vietnam
- Founded: 1970
- Awards: Golden Lotus: Giữa dòng (Direct-to-Video Feature); Đường mòn trên biển Đông (Documentary); Hồ Chí Minh với Trung Quốc (Documentary); Một số loài ong mật ở Việt Nam (Science); Lời cảnh báo của biển (Science)
- Festival date: November 28 - November 30, 1996
- Website: 11th Vietnam Film Festival

Vietnam Film Festival chronology
- 12th 10th

The 11th Vietnam Film Festival was held from November 28 to November 30, 1996, in Hanoi, Vietnam, with the slogan: "For an advanced Vietnam cinema imbued with national identity" (Vietnamese: "Vì một nền điện ảnh Việt Nam tiên tiến đậm đà bản sắc dân tộc").

== Event ==
There were 129 films in attendance at the Film Festival. The jury has awarded only two Golden Lotuses for documentary and science films and vacated the Golden Lotus in both feature films and animated films.

However, this is the first time that the Vietnam Film Festival has found a Golden Lotus for a direct-to-video feature film, which is "Giữa dòng" - a film produced by Ho Chi Minh City Television. This incident marked the decline of the commercial direct-to-video film and the rise of television film.

The film "Thương nhớ đồng quê" by director Đặng Nhật Minh was not supported by the press before attending the film festival even though it was a good film. These articles invisibly influenced the judges, causing them to find other solutions. In the end, instead of awarding the film, they decided to give it the Best Director award.

== Awards ==
=== Feature film ===
Award		Winner
Film	Golden Lotus	not awarded
Film	Silver Lotus	Cây bạch đàn vô danh Bụi hồng Giải hạn Hoa của trời
Film	Jury's Merit	Bản tình ca trong đêm Lưỡi dao
Best Director		Đặng Nhật Minh – Thương nhớ đồng quê
Best Actor		Thiệu Ánh Dương – Lưỡi dao, Bản tình ca trong đêm
Best Actress		Chiều Xuân – Người yêu đi lấy chồng Lê Vi – Cây bạch đàn vô danh
Best Screenplay		Lê Ngọc Minh – Hoa của trời, Người yêu đi lấy chồng
Best Cinematography		Phi Tiến Sơn – Giọt lệ Hạ Long; Nguyễn Đức Việt – Cây bạch đàn vô danh, Nước mắt thời mở cửa
Best Art Design		Phạm Quốc Trung – Trở về Nguyễn Quý Viện – Bụi hồng
Best Original Score		Phó Đức Phương – Cây bạch đàn vô danh

==== Direct-to-video ====
Award		Winner
Film	Golden Lotus	Giữa dòng
Film	Silver Lotus	Ảo ảnh giữa đời thường Nước mắt đàn bà
Film	Jury's Merit	Cổ tích Việt Nam 06; Điện thoại đồ chơi
Best Director		Trần Mỹ Hà – Giữa dòng
Best Actor		Trần Hạnh – Nước mắt đàn bà
Best Actress		Ngọc Hiệp – Giữa dòng
Best Screenplay		Phạm Thanh Phong (Note: Went by the pseudonym Phạm Gia Thanh) – Điện thoại đồ chơi
Best Cinematography		Trương Minh Phúc – Giữa dòng

=== Documentary/Science film ===
Award		Winner
Film	Golden Lotus	Đường mòn trên biển Đông; Hồ Chí Minh với Trung Quốc; Một số loài ong mật ở Việt Nam; Lời cảnh báo của biển
Film	Silver Lotus	Niềm vinh quang lặng lẽ Thời gian vĩnh cửu
Film	Jury's Merit	Những người quyết tử Chính quy ở đơn vị cơ sở
Best Director		Thanh An, Đào Trọng Khánh – Hồ Chí Minh với Trung Quốc; Phạm Khắc – Khi đàn sếu trở về
Best Screenplay		Văn Lê – Niềm vinh quang lặng lẽ
Best Cinematography		Vương Khánh Luông – Khoảng vượt Nguyễn Thước – Chìm nổi sông Hương

=== Animated film ===
Award		Winner
Film	Golden Lotus	not awarded
Film	Silver Lotus	Quỷ núi và tình yêu Chú chuột biến hình Trê Cóc
Best Acting Animator		Nguyễn Hà Bắc – Chú chuột biến hình
Best Shaping Animator		Nguyễn Bích, Hữu Đức – Trê cóc Nguyễn Phương Hoa – Quỷ núi và tình yêu
