= 7th Vietnam Film Festival =

Liên hoan phim Việt Nam lần thứ 7 (7th Vietnam Film Festival)
- Location: Hanoi, Vietnam
- Founded: 1970
- Awards: Golden Lotus: Bao giờ cho đến tháng Mười (Feature); Xa và gần (Feature); 1/50 giây cuộc đời (Documentary); Người Công giáo huyện Thống Nhất (Documentary); Việt Nam - Hồ Chí Minh (Documentary)
- Festival date: October 14 - October 20, 1985
- Website: 7th Vietnam Film Festival

Vietnam Film Festival chronology
- 8th 6th

The 7th Vietnam Film Festival was held from October 14 to October 20, 1985, in Hanoi, Vietnam, with the slogan: "For the Socialist Fatherland, for the people's happiness, for the development of the national cinema" (Vietnamese: "Vì Tổ quốc xã hội chủ nghĩa, vì hạnh phúc của nhân dân, vì sự phát triển của nền điện ảnh dân tộc").

== Event ==
The 7th Vietnam Film Festival was held in the context that the country was in the eve of the Renovated Era with many difficulties, but the festival was still organized fairly and warmly.

There are a total of 103 films participating in this film festival. Two feature films "Bao giờ cho đến tháng Mười" and "Xa và gần" were awarded the Golden Lotus along with a number of films in the documentary-science category, but no Golden Lotus for the animated film.

== Awards ==
=== Feature film ===
Award		Winner
Film	Golden Lotus	Bao giờ cho đến tháng Mười; Xa và gần
Film	Silver Lotus	Ván bài lật ngửa: Trời xanh qua kẽ lá
Best Director		Đặng Nhật Minh – Bao giờ cho đến tháng Mười; Huy Thành – Xa và gần
Best Actor		Nguyễn Chánh Tín – Ván bài lật ngửa: Trời xanh qua kẽ lá Hữu Mười – Bao giờ cho đến tháng Mười
Best Actress		Lê Vân – Bao giờ cho đến tháng Mười; Thụy Vân – Xa và gần Thanh Quý – Tình yêu và khoảng cách
Best Screenplay		Nguyễn Mạnh Tuấn – Xa và gần
Best Cinematography		Nguyễn Quang Tuấn – Biệt động Sài Gòn: Tình lặng Trần Đình Mưu – Bài ca không quên Nguyễn Mạnh Lân – Bao giờ cho đến tháng Mười
Best Art Design		Nguyễn Văn Vý – Bao giờ cho đến tháng Mười; Nguyễn Phú Nghĩa – Xa và gần
Best Original Score		Phú Quang – Bao giờ cho đến tháng Mười; Phạm Minh Tuấn – Bài ca không quên

=== Documentary/Science film ===
==== Documentary ====
Award		Winner
Film	Golden Lotus	1/50 giây cuộc đời Người Công giáo huyện Thống Nhất; Tiếng nổ định hướng Việt Nam - Hồ Chí Minh
Film	Silver Lotus	Đến với những nhịp cầu Hạt lúa vùng nước mặn
Best Director		Đào Trọng Khánh – Việt Nam - Hồ Chí Minh, 1/50 giây cuộc đời
Best Screenplay		Trần Đình Văn, Văn Lê – Người Công giáo huyện Thống Nhất
Best Cinematography		Đinh Anh Dũng – 1/50 giây cuộc đời, Người Công giáo huyện Thống Nhất; Lê Mạnh Thích – Đến với những nhịp cầu
Best Cinematography in Reportage film		The cinematography crew of the film Quốc Khánh Campuchia; Bùi Xuân Thiện – Đồng Văn những ngày tháng Năm, Thị trấn yên tĩnh (Note: Distinguished from the feature film of the same name that wins the Grand Jury Prize in 1988)
Best Original Score		Đặng Hữu Phúc – 1/50 giây cuộc đời, Việt Nam - Hồ Chí Minh; Hoàng Bội – Đồng đội

==== Science ====
Award		Winner
Film	Golden Lotus	not awarded
Film	Silver Lotus	Đất Hạ Long; Bệnh dịch hạch
Best Screenplay		Nguyễn Khắc Viện – Đất Tây Sơn; Lại Văn Sinh – Bệnh dịch hạch
Best Cinematography		Việt Thanh – Đất Tây Sơn, Đất Hạ Long
Best Original Score		Hoàng Vân – Đất Tây Sơn, Đất Hạ Long
Best Narrative		Lâm Quang Ngọc – Rừng Cúc Phương; Nguyễn Khắc Viện – Đất Hạ Long

=== Children/Animated film ===
Award		Winner
Film	Golden Lotus	not awarded
Film	Silver Lotus	Đàn chim trở về Diều hâu Ai cũng phải sợ Kiến đỏ Những họa sĩ bút chì
Best Director		Phạm Minh Trí – Diều hâu Hồ Đắc Vũ – Câu hỏi bất ngờ
Best Screenplay		Nguyễn Thị Vân Anh – Ai cũng phải sợ
Best Cinematography		Phạm Ngọc Lan – Đàn chim trở về Nguyễn Thị Hằng – Cô bé chân đất và anh dế mèn, Những họa sĩ bút chì Nguyễn Bình Quốc - Kiến đỏ
Best Animator		Trần Lãng, Viết Minh, Hoàng Thái – Những họa sĩ bút chì
Best Original Score		Y Vân – Kiến đỏ, Câu hỏi bất ngờ Nguyễn Thị Nhung – Chú gấu tham lam
