= 9th Vietnam Film Festival =

Liên hoan phim Việt Nam lần thứ 9 (9th Vietnam Film Festival)
- Location: Nha Trang, Vietnam
- Founded: 1970
- Awards: Golden Lotus: Hồ Chí Minh: Chân dung một con người (Documentary); Hồ Chí Minh: Hình ảnh của Người (Documentary)
- Festival date: November 28 - December 2, 1990
- Website: 9th Vietnam Film Festival

Vietnam Film Festival chronology
- 10th 8th

The 9th Vietnam Film Festival was held from November 28 to December 2, 1990, in Nha Trang, Vietnam, with the slogan: "For artistic creativity and perfecting socialist Vietnamese people, for the development of national cinema" (Vietnamese: "Vì sự sáng tạo nghệ thuật và hoàn thiện con người Việt Nam xã hội chủ nghĩa, vì sự phát triển của nền điện ảnh dân tộc").

== Event ==
This film festival has 108 films participating. For the first time, the festival opened an additional film section for the direct-to-video feature film category.

There is not a single Golden Lotus for feature film, direct-to-video film, children and animated film. The jury only awarded the Golden Lotus for two documentaries about Leader Hồ Chí Minh: "Hồ Chí Minh: Chân dung một con người" and "Hồ Chí Minh: Hình ảnh của Người".

The film "Gánh xiếc rong" was highly appreciated but also caused a lot of controversy among the judges. In the end, it was only received the Silver Lotus award.

== Awards ==
=== Feature film ===
Award		Winner
Film	Golden Lotus	not awarded
Film	Silver Lotus	Gánh xiếc rong Tướng về hưu Kiếp phù du
Film	Grand Jury Prize	Người trong cuộc Người tìm vàng Người đàn bà nghịch cát
Best Director		Việt Linh – Gánh xiếc rong
Best Actor		Bắc Sơn – Người tìm vàng
Best Actress		Minh Châu – Người đàn bà nghịch cát Hoàng Cúc – Tướng về hưu
Best Cinematography		Trần Trung Nhàn – Tướng về hưu, Đêm hội Long Trì, Kiếp phù du Đinh Anh Dũng – Gánh xiếc rong
Best Art Design		Đào Đức – Đêm hội Long Trì; Trần Kiềm – Chiến trường chia nửa vầng trăng
Best Original Score		Đỗ Hồng Quân – Kiếp phù du

==== Direct-to-video ====
Award		Winner
Film	Golden Lotus	not awarded
Film	Silver Lotus	Lá ngọc cành vàng
Best Actor		not awarded
Best Actress		Thu Hà – Lá ngọc cành vàng
Best Cinematography		Phi Tiến Sơn – Lá ngọc cành vàng

=== Documentary/Science film ===
Award		Winner
Film	Golden Lotus	Hồ Chí Minh: Chân dung một con người Hồ Chí Minh: Hình ảnh của người
Film	Silver Lotus	Ngưỡng cửa
Film	Jury's Merit	Vũ khí tự làm của toàn dân đánh giặc
Best Cinematography		Vũ Văn Chính – Tác chiến trên quê hương đồng nước Nguyễn Như Vũ – Bước ngoặt hiểm nghèo
Best Music Editing		Trần Ngà – Tác chiến trên quê hương đồng nước & other works

=== Children/Animated film ===
==== Children ====
Award		Winner
Film	Golden Lotus	not awarded
Film	Silver Lotus	Tuổi thơ dữ dội (Note: Counted as a Silver Lotus for Feature Film)
Best Directing for the First Film		Nguyễn Vinh Sơn – Tuổi thơ dữ dội
Best Actor		Nguyễn Thanh Bình – Tuổi thơ dữ dội
Best Cinematography		Thủy Hằng – Tướng tò he Lê Đình Ấn – Tuổi thơ dữ dội Trần Quốc Dũng – Học trò thủy thần

==== Animated ====
Award		Winner
Film	Golden Lotus	not awarded
Film	Silver Lotus	Mèo và chuột
Best Director		Bảo Quang – Mèo và chuột
Best Screenplay		Lâm Quang – Mèo và chuột
Best Cinematography		Nguyễn Thị Hằng – Võ sỹ bọ ngựa
