= 17th Parallel, Nights and Days =

1973 film

- Directed by: Hai Ninh
- Written by: Tich Chi Hoang; Hai Ninh
- Starring: Mang Long Dao
- Cinematography: Xuan Chan Nguyen
- Release date: July 1973
- Running time: 90 minutes
- Country: North Vietnam
- Language: Vietnamese

17th Parallel, Nights and Days (Vietnamese: Vĩ tuyến 17 ngày và đêm) is a 1973 Vietnamese drama film directed by Hai Ninh. It was entered into the 8th Moscow International Film Festival where Tra Giang won the award for Best Actress.

== Cast ==
- Mang Long Dao
- Ba Loc Duong
- Doan Duong
- Toi Lam
- Ho Thai
- Tra Giang
