= 12th Vietnam Film Festival =

Liên hoan phim Việt Nam lần thứ 12 (12th Vietnam Film Festival)
- Location: Huế, Vietnam
- Founded: 1970
- Awards: Golden Lotus: Ngã ba Đồng Lộc (Feature); Trở lại Ngư Thủy (Documentary); Cánh chim không mỏi (Direct-to-Video Documentary)
- Festival date: March 25 - March 28, 1999
- Website: 12th Vietnam Film Festival

Vietnam Film Festival chronology
- 13th 11th

The 12th Vietnam Film Festival was held from March 25 to March 28, 1999, in Huế, Vietnam, with the slogan: "For an advanced Vietnam cinema imbued with national identity" (Vietnamese: "Vì một nền điện ảnh Việt Nam tiên tiến đậm đà bản sắc dân tộc").

== Event ==
The festival that year had its own way of organizing, not bustling but very grandiose, imbued with national identity.

There are 114 films in attendance at the Film Festival (16 feature films, 19 direct-to-video feature films, 17 animated films, 62 documentary/science films). The closing night was a fierce competition between the two films "Hà Nội mùa đông năm 46" and "Ngã ba Đồng Lộc" causing the audience to wait and discuss.

In the end, 3 Golden Lotuses were awarded for categories: feature film (1 film), documentary film (1 film) and direct-to-video documentary (1 film). For the first time, there are awards for actor/actress in supporting roles.

== Awards ==
=== Feature film ===
Award		Winner
Film	Golden Lotus	Ngã ba Đồng Lộc
Film	Silver Lotus	Ai xuôi vạn lý Những người thợ xẻ Hà Nội mùa đông năm 46
Film	Jury's Merit	Bỏ trốn Chung cư
Best Director		Đặng Nhật Minh – Hà Nội mùa đông năm 46
Best Actor		Quốc Trị – Những người thợ xẻ Công Ninh – Ai xuôi vạn lý
Best Actress		not awarded
Best Supporting Actor		not awarded
Best Supporting Actress		not awarded
Best Screenplay		Sơn Trang – Những người thợ xẻ
Best Cinematography		Vũ Quốc Tuấn – Hà Nội mùa đông năm 46, Những người thợ xẻ Phạm Hoàng Nam – Ai xuôi vạn lý, Hải Nguyệt
Best Art Design		Phạm Quốc Trung – Hà Nội mùa đông năm 46, Những người thợ xẻ
Best Original Score		Đỗ Hồng Quân – Hà Nội mùa đông năm 46, Những người thợ xẻ

==== Direct-to-video ====
Award		Winner
Film	Golden Lotus	not awarded
Film	Silver Lotus	Cầu thang tối Cha con ông Mắt Mèo; Cha tôi và hai người đàn bà
Best Director		Đào Bá Sơn – Cầu thang tối Vũ Châu – Cha tôi và hai người đàn bà
Best Actor		not awarded
Best Actress		not awarded
Prospective Acting		Hồng Ánh – Cầu thang tối
Best Supporting Actor		Thái Hoàng Hải – Cha con ông Mắt Mèo
Best Supporting Actress		Quách Thu Phương – Cha tôi và hai người đàn bà
Best Cinematography		Nguyễn Trinh Hoan – Cổ tích Việt Nam 09

=== Documentary film ===
Award		Winner
Film	Golden Lotus	Trở lại Ngư Thủy; Cánh chim không mỏi
Film	Silver Lotus	Tiếng vĩ cầm ở Mỹ Lai; Mùa xuân toàn thắng Nơi chiến tranh đã đi qua Người viết cảm tử quân Yến và Người
Film	Jury's Merit	Nhà văn chiến sĩ
Best Director		Lê Mạnh Thích – Trở lại Ngư Thủy; Trần Văn Thủy – Tiếng vĩ cầm ở Mỹ Lai
Best Screenplay		Nguyễn Thước – Trở lại Ngư Thủy, Concert, Xẩm
Best Narrative		Nguyễn Sỹ Chung – Một thời để nhớ, Dấu ấn thế kỷ, Chuyện voi ở buôn Đôn

=== Animated film ===
Award		Winner
Film	Golden Lotus	not awarded
Film	Silver Lotus	Quạ và Công; Tổ tiên loài ếch Cái ô đỏ
Best Screenplay		Đinh Tiếp – Tổ tiên loài ếch, Quán thỏ Rô-ti
Best Cinematography		Viết Tuế – Tổ tiên loài ếch, Cái ô đỏ
Best Shaping Animator		Nguyễn Phương Hoa – Tổ tiên loài ếch, Cô nàng dây cót
Best Acting Animator		Hoàng Lộc – Tổ tiên loài ếch, Cái ô đỏ The Animator Crew of Quán thỏ Rô-ti
