= 6th Vietnam Film Festival =

Liên hoan phim Việt Nam lần thứ 6 (6th Vietnam Film Festival)
- Location: Ho Chi Minh City, Vietnam
- Founded: 1970
- Awards: Golden Lotus: Thị xã trong tầm tay (Feature); Về nơi gió cát (Feature); Cuộc đụng đầu lịch sử (Documentary); Đất Tổ nghìn xưa (Documentary); Đường dây lên sông Đà (Documentary); Những chặng đường cách mạng vẻ vang (Documentary); Cái mũ của vịt con (Animated); Giai điệu (Animated); Âu Cơ - Lạc Long Quân (Animated)
- Festival date: April 22 - April 29, 1983
- Website: 6th Vietnam Film Festival

Vietnam Film Festival chronology
- 7th 5th

The 6th Vietnam Film Festival was held from April 22 to April 29, 1983 in Ho Chi Minh City, Vietnam with the slogan: "For the Socialist Fatherland, for the people's happiness, for the development of the national cinema" (Vietnamese: "Vì Tổ quốc xã hội chủ nghĩa, vì hạnh phúc của nhân dân, vì sự phát triển của nền điện ảnh dân tộc").

== Event ==
With 100 films participating in the Film Festival, 8 Golden Lotuses were awarded in the categories: Feature film (2 films), Documentary film (4 films), Animated film (3 films).

The jury are representatives in both film and literature fields with names such as Chế Lan Viên, Nguyễn Khải, Hoàng Trung Thông, Phạm Kỳ Nam, Trần Vũ, etc.

== Awards ==
=== Feature film ===
Award		Winner
Film	Golden Lotus	Thị xã trong tầm tay Về nơi gió cát
Film	Silver Lotus	Hy vọng cuối cùng Vùng gió xoáy Miền đất không cô đơn Ngọn lửa Thành Đồng
Film	Grand Jury Prize	Ván bài lật ngửa: Đứa con nuôi vị giám mục Tình yêu của em
Film	Jury's Merit	Đất mẹ Biển sáng
Best Director		Trần Phương – Hy vọng cuối cùng
Best Actor		Lý Huỳnh – Vùng gió xoáy Bùi Cường – Làng Vũ Đại ngày ấy
Best Actress		Hương Xuân – Về nơi gió cát Diệu Thuần – Ngày ấy bên sông Lam, Trở về Sam Sao; Mộng Tuyền – Tình yêu của em
Best Screenplay		Đặng Nhật Minh – Thị xã trong tầm tay Huy Thành – Về nơi gió cát
Best Cinematography		Lê Đình Ẩn – Về nơi gió cát Nguyễn Hữu Tuấn (Note: Nguyễn Hữu Tuấn received a Silver award for Cinematography with the film Hy vọng cuối cùng) – Thị xã trong tầm tay
Best Art Design		Đào Đức – Đất mẹ Phạm Nguyên Cẩn – Chiếc vòng bạc
Best Original Score		Cát Vận – Thị xã trong tầm tay Phạm Trọng Cầu, Trịnh Công Sơn – Pho tượng

=== Documentary/Science film ===
Award		Winner
Film	Golden Lotus	Cuộc đụng đầu lịch sử Đất Tổ nghìn xưa Đường dây lên sông Đà; Những chặng đường cách mạng vẻ vang
Film	Silver Lotus	Trẻ em vẽ Đừng quên tôi Lời cuối
Film	Grand Jury Prize	Hoài bão người nuôi rắn
Best Director		Lê Mạnh Thích – Đường dây lên sông Đà; Nguyễn Vũ Đức – 20 năm sau
Best Screenplay		Nguyễn Khắc Viện – Đất Tổ nghìn xưa Đào Trọng Khánh – Những khu vườn, Đôi mắt Tổ quốc
Best Cinematography		Hoàng Ngọc Dũng – Ong mật với cây trồng Trần Mỹ Hà – Hoài bão người nuôi rắn, Cửa sổ tâm hồn, Tiếng đàn của emại LTai; Vũ Tri Phương – Những khu vườn

=== Children/Animated film ===
Award		Winner
Film	Golden Lotus	Cái mũ của vịt con Giai điệu Âu Cơ - Lạc Long Quân
Film	Silver Lotus	Cún con đi học Bước ngoặt Quà biếu Trăng rằm
Film	Grand Jury Prize	Chim cút làm tổ
Best Director		Đặng Hiền – Giai điệu, Chú gà trống choai
Best Screenplay		Trần Hoài Dương – Bé Rơm; Trần Ngọc Thanh – Giai điệu
Best Animator		Nguyễn Nhân Lập – Giai điệu, Âu Cơ - Lạc Long Quân
