= Trà Giang =

Vietnamese actress

- Born: Nguyễn Thị Trà Giang; December 11, 1942 (age 83); Phan Thiết, Bình Thuận, French Indochina (now Vietnam)
- Citizenship: Vietnamese
- Awards: People's Artist (1984)

NSND Trà Giang (born December 11, 1942) is a Vietnamese actress. She won the award for Best Actress at the 8th Moscow International Film Festival for her role in 17th Parallel, Nights and Days.

== Selected filmography ==
- 17th Parallel, Nights and Days (1973)
- Girl from Hanoi (1975)

== Awards ==
- People's Artist (1984)
