= 10th Vietnam Film Festival =

1993 film festival in Haiphong, Vietnam

Liên hoan phim Việt Nam lần thứ 10 (10th Vietnam Film Festival)
- Location: Haiphong, Vietnam
- Founded: 1970
- Awards: Golden Lotus: Vị đắng tình yêu (Feature); Đi tìm đồng đội (Documentary); Bọn trẻ (Children)
- Festival date: November 9 - November 14, 1993
- Website: 10th Vietnam Film Festival

Vietnam Film Festival chronology
- 11th 9th

The 10th Vietnam Film Festival was held from November 9 to November 14, 1993, in Haiphong, Vietnam, with the slogan: "For an advanced Vietnam cinema, imbued with national identity" (Vietnamese: "Vì một nền điện ảnh Việt Nam tiên tiến, đậm đà bản sắc dân tộc").

== Event ==
Compared to previous festivals, the 10th Vietnam Film Festival attracts the attention of a large number of young audiences. The phenomenon of fans of artists, waiting for autographs, taking photos together has begun to spread more widely among different audiences. This is considered a "characteristic" film festival for the period of "market - commercial cinema".

There were 118 films in attendance at the Film Festival. The jury awarded only one Golden Lotus for "Vị đắng tình yêu" - A feature film that harmoniously combines artistic and commercial elements, and one Golden Lotus for the documentary "Đi tìm đồng đội". There is no Golden Lotus for animated and direct-to-video feature films.

== Awards ==
=== Feature film ===
Award		Winner
Film	Golden Lotus	Vị đắng tình yêu
Film	Silver Lotus	Canh bạc Xương rồng đen Lương tâm bé bỏng
Film	Grand Jury Prize	Dấu ấn của quỷ Chuyện tình bên dòng sông
Best Director		Lê Xuân Hoàng – Vị đắng tình yêu Lưu Trọng Ninh – Hãy tha thứ cho em, Canh bạc
Best Actor		Lê Công Tuấn Anh – Vị đắng tình yêu Trần Lực – Đời hát rong
Best Actress		Thu Hà – Canh bạc Lê Khanh – Chuyện tình bên dòng sông
Best Screenplay		Lê Hoàng – Lương tâm bé bỏng Nguyễn Thị Hồng Ngát – Canh bạc
Best Cinematography		Đoàn Quốc – Dấu ấn của quỷ Đinh Anh Dũng – Xương rồng đen
Best Art Design		Phạm Hồng Phong – Dấu ấn của quỷ Bích Hải – Giông tố
Best Original Score		Trọng Đài – Canh bạc Đỗ Hồng Quân – Cỏ lau

==== Direct-to-video ====
Award		Winner
Film	Golden Lotus	not awarded
Film	Silver Lotus	Em còn nhớ hay em đã quên Anh chỉ có mình em Cô thủ môn tội nghiệp
Film	Grand Jury Prize	Băng qua bóng tối
Best Director		Lê Hoàng Hoa – Tình nhỏ làm sao quên
Best Actor		Lê Công Tuấn Anh – Em còn nhớ hay em đã quên, Hiệp sĩ cuối cùng
Best Actress		Mỹ Duyên – Tình nhỏ làm sao quên, Băng qua bóng tối
Best Screenplay		Nguyễn Hữu Phần – Em còn nhớ hay em đã quên Lê Hoàng – Băng qua bóng tối
Best Cinematography		Phạm Việt Thanh – Khát vọng bi thương
Best Original Score		Phú Thăng – Băng qua bóng tối Hoàng Lương – Em còn nhớ hay em đã quên

=== Documentary/Science film ===
Award		Winner
Film	Golden Lotus	Đi tìm đồng đội
Film	Silver Lotus	Cái Bến
Film	Grand Jury Prize	Thiện và ác Hậu cần dã ngoại
Best Screenplay		Văn Lê – Cái Bến, Thiện và ác
Best Cinematography		Nguyễn Thước, Lê Mạnh Thích – Dòng sông ánh sáng

=== Children/Animated film ===
Award		Winner
Film	Golden Lotus	Bọn trẻ
Film	Silver Lotus	Ông tướng canh đền Chú lừa xám Cầu vồng hóa đá
Best Director		Nguyễn Khánh Dư – Bọn trẻ Phạm Minh Trí – Ông tướng canh đền
Best Actor		The children cast – Cát bụi hè đường Actor in the role Hùng "sẹo" – Chú bé có tài mở khóa
Best Cinematography		Trần Quốc Dũng, Phi Tiến Sơn – Truyền thuyết tình yêu thần nước
Best Key Animator		Nguyễn Phương Hoa – Ông tướng canh đền, Chiếc vòng cổ
Best Paper Cut Acting Animator		Nguyễn Hà Bắc – Quả bầu tiên Thanh Việt, Lan Phương, Lâm Chiến, Tường Long, Nguyễn Thị Măng – Cái đầu... cái đuôi
