= 4th Vietnam Film Festival =

Liên hoan phim Việt Nam lần thứ 4 (4th Vietnam Film Festival)
- Opening film: Chiến thắng lịch sử Xuân 1975
- Location: Ho Chi Minh City, Vietnam
- Founded: 1970
- Awards: Golden Lotus: Sao tháng Tám (Feature); Chiến thắng lịch sử xuân 1975 (Documentary); Thành phố lúc rạng đông (Documentary)
- Festival date: April 14 - April 21, 1977
- Website: 4th Vietnam Film Festival

Vietnam Film Festival chronology
- 5th 3rd

The 4th Vietnam Film Festival was held from April 14 to April 21, 1977 in Ho Chi Minh City, Vietnam, with the slogan: "For the Socialist Fatherland and the people's happiness. For the development of the national cinema." (Vietnamese: "Vì Tổ quốc xã hội chủ nghĩa và hạnh phúc của nhân dân. Vì sự phát triển của nền điện ảnh dân tộc").

== Event ==
This is the first film festival of the unified Vietnamese cinema, honoring the achievements of composing in the first two years after Reunification.

This is the fourth Vietnam Film Festival, but it is the first time to gather cinematic artists and works from both North and South, so compared to the previous three festivals, the number of films participating has increased by one and a half times (69 films in total). Particularly, feature films and movies have not only increased in quantity but also in quality. The film festival also appeared many new units such as General Film Studio, Ho Chi Minh City Television Station. The number of delegates was also expanded, the number of which doubled. In addition to the jury in the film categories as last time, in 1977 there was also a technical jury.

A special feature of this film festival is that there have been many film selection contests held in advance to collect opinions from a wide range of viewers, helping the jury to consider more comprehensively and accurately. Regardless of the large number of viewers everywhere who watched the film first to participate in the film selection contest, in Ho Chi Minh City alone, there were over 500,000 viewers on this occasion. A large number of audiences are very passionate about the national cinema, follow every step and are interested in commenting, evaluating, and criticizing each contest film.

Also within the framework of the film festival, the Vietnam Film Association held a seminar with the theme "Striving to create many beautiful and rich artistic images about the new society and new people on the Vietnamese screen". The artists enthusiastically responded and participated in enthusiastic speeches. In addition, within the framework of the festival, there are also many meetings and contacts between filmmakers and a large audience of all backgrounds and ages.

The opening and closing ceremonies of the awards were held at the Rex Hotel, right next to City Hall. The documentary film "Chiến thắng lịch sử Xuân 1975" was screened on the opening day of the festival. This is the film festival with the fewest awards since the birth of the Vietnam Film Festival: there is only one Golden Lotus for the feature film "Sao tháng Tám" - the most complete film about the historical August Revolution. The film festival also only awarded two Golden Lotus for documentary film "Chiến thắng lịch sử Xuân 1975" and "Thành phố lúc rạng đông", no Golden Lotus for animated films.

== Awards ==
=== Feature film ===
Award		Winner
Film	Golden Lotus	Sao tháng Tám
Film	Silver Lotus	Chuyến xe bão táp Ngày lễ Thánh; Ngày tàn của bạo chúa Cô Nhíp
Best Director		Nguyễn Khắc Lợi – Hai người mẹ
Best Actor		Huy Công – Đứa con nuôi
Best Actress		Trà Giang – Ngày lễ Thánh; Thanh Tú – Sao tháng Tám
Best Screenplay		Bành Bảo, Trần Vũ – Chuyến xe bão táp
Best Cinematography		Nguyễn Khánh Dư – Hai người mẹ
Best Art Design		Ngọc Linh – Sao tháng Tám
Best Original Score		Phó Đức Phương – Đứa con nuôi
Commendable Acting		Thanh Quý – Chuyến xe bão táp

=== Documentary/Science film ===
Award		Winner
Film	Golden Lotus	Chiến thắng lịch sử Xuân 1975; Thành phố lúc rạng đông
Film	Silver Lotus	Hình ảnh quân đội số 14; Hòn đảo ngọc Miền Nam trong trái tim tôi Tháng Năm, những gương mặt Tiếng nổ sau chiến tranh Hình ảnh Quân đội số 14 - 1976
Best Director		Phạm Kỳ Nam – Miền Nam trong trái tim tôi
Best Screenplay		Phạm Khánh Toàn – Hòn đảo ngọc
Best Cinematography		Nguyễn Khánh Dư – Thành phố lúc rạng đông Lương Đức – Đường chúng ta đi
Best Original Score		Đàm Linh – Tiếng nổ sau chiến tranh

=== Animated film ===
Award		Winner
Film	Golden Lotus	not awarded
Film	Silver Lotus	Giấc mơ bay Con kiến và hạt gạo Cây chổi đẹp nhất
Film	Jury's Merit	Thạch Sanh; Tôm nhỏ và Hải Quỳ
Best Director		Nguyễn Thị Nghiêm Dung, Hồ Quảng – Con kiến và hạt gạo
Best Screenplay		Trần Quang Hân – Cây chổi đẹp nhất
Best Animator		Lê Thanh, Lý Duy – Cây chổi đẹp nhất
