= 8th Vietnam Film Festival =

Liên hoan phim Việt Nam lần thứ 8 (8th Vietnam Film Festival)
- Location: Danang, Vietnam
- Founded: 1970
- Awards: Golden Lotus: Anh và em (Feature); Truyện cổ tích cho tuổi mười bảy (Feature); Hà Nội trong mắt ai (Documentary); Cánh kiến đỏ (Science); Dũng sĩ Đam Dông (Animated); Sáng (Animated)
- Festival date: March 15 - March 22, 1988
- Website: 8th Vietnam Film Festival

Vietnam Film Festival chronology
- 9th 7th

The 8th Vietnam Film Festival was held from March 15 to March 22, 1988, in Danang, Vietnam, with the slogan "For the creation of art and perfection of the new socialist people. For the development of the national cinema" (Vietnamese: "Vì sự sáng tạo nghệ thuật và hoàn thiện con người mới xã hội chủ nghĩa. Vì sự phát triển của nền điện ảnh dân tộc").

== Event ==
At this film festival, there are many typical faces of artists, many artistic styles are shown on a rich and massive work scale, which can be said to be unprecedented up to that time. A total of 146 films participated in the Film Festival: 17 feature films, 52 documentary/ science films, 22 animated films, and 12 children films were brought to the competition.

This is the most exciting film festival with the enthusiastic response of the public. It is the first film festival in the country's Renovated Era with a wide variety of films, reflecting the core issues of society. In the end, 6 Golden Lotuses were awarded equally for each category of feature film, documentary/science film, children/animated film.

The film "Cô gái trên sông" was given enough marks by the judges to win the Golden Lotus award, but then people spread the news that the film was banned, so it dropped to the Silver Lotus award. Later, when the delegations returned from Da Nang and passed through Hue, seeing this film being shown everywhere, it turned out that there was no ban at all.

== Awards ==
=== Feature film ===
Award		Winner
Film	Golden Lotus	Anh và em Truyện cổ tích cho tuổi mười bảy
Film	Silver Lotus	Cô gái trên sông Huyền thoại về người mẹ
Film	Grand Jury Prize	Thằng Bờm; Hai Cũ; Cơn lốc đen Phiên tòa cần chánh án
Film	Jury's Merit	Nhiệm vụ hoa hồng
Best Director		Xuân Sơn – Truyện cổ tích cho tuổi mười bảy Lê Đức Tiến – Thằng Bờm
Best Actor		Trịnh Thịnh – Thị trấn yên tĩnh, Thằng Bờm
Best Actress		Trà Giang – Huyền thoại về người mẹ, Thủ lĩnh áo nâu Minh Châu – Cô gái trên sông
Prospective Acting		Ngọc Bích – Cuộc chia tay không hẹn trước
Best Screenplay		Trịnh Thanh Nhã – Truyện cổ tích cho tuổi mười bảy Đoàn Trúc Quỳnh – Thị trấn yên tĩnh
Best Cinematography		Trương Minh – Truyện cổ tích cho tuổi mười bảy Trần Ngọc Huỳnh – Phiên tòa cần chánh án
Best Art Design		Phạm Quang Vĩnh – Truyện cổ tích cho tuổi mười bảy, Thủ lĩnh áo nâu
Best Original Score		Đỗ Hồng Quân – Thằng Bờm; Nguyễn Xinh – Truyện cổ tích cho tuổi mười bảy

=== Documentary/Science film ===
==== Documentary ====
Award		Winner
Film	Golden Lotus	Hà Nội trong mắt ai
Film	Silver Lotus	Ngôi sao không tắt Bài học về một con người Người chủ nhiệm xứ đạo Trên tầng cao cây xanh
Film	Grand Jury Prize	Nhịp sống mặt trận Con lợn Đại Lâm; Mầu xanh Trường Xa; Giả và thật
Best Director		Trần Văn Thủy – Hà Nội trong mắt ai
Best Screenplay		Đào Trọng Khánh, Lưu Xuân Thư – Hà Nội trong mắt ai
Best Cinematography		Lưu Hà – Hà Nội trong mắt ai Lê Hợi – Tổ Quốc trên một hòn đảo, Ngôi sao không tắt, Nhịp sống mặt trận Lê Mạnh Thích – Ông tiên trong tù

==== Science ====
Award		Winner
Film	Golden Lotus	Cánh kiến đỏ
Film	Silver Lotus	Cá trôi Ấn; Bệnh dịch hạch
Film	Grand Jury Prize	Bí mật pho tượng chùa Đậu; Làng tranh Đông Hồ
Best Screenplay		Lại Văn Sinh – Cánh kiến đỏ
Best Cinematography		Hoàng Ngọc Dũng – Cánh kiến đỏ Lương Đức - Cá trôi Ấn

=== Children/Animated film ===
Award		Winner
Film	Golden Lotus	Dũng sĩ Đam Dông (Animated); Sáng (Animated)
Film	Silver Lotus	Trường học của bói cá (Animated); Ngọn đèn trong mơ (Children); Khi vắng bà (Children)
Film	Grand Jury Prize	Ngựa thần Tây Sơn (Animated); Sơn ca trong thành phố (Children)
Best Director		Lê Thanh – Dũng sĩ Đam Dông; Anh Thái – Khi vắng bà
Best Cinematography		Thủy Hằng – Dũng sĩ Đam Dông
Best Art Design		Nguyễn Văn Vý – Ngọn đèn trong mơ
Best Key Animator		Trương Phú Hòa – Trường ca Đam San; Nguyễn Phương Hoa – Chuyện cổ Thành Ốc
Best Acting Animator		Ti Vi, Việt Hòa, Quốc Thông – Sáng
Best Original Score		Nguyễn Cường – Dũng sĩ Đam Dông
