= 5th Vietnam Film Festival =

Liên hoan phim Việt Nam lần thứ 5 (5th Vietnam Film Festival)
- Location: Hanoi, Vietnam
- Founded: 1970
- Awards: Golden Lotus: Cánh đồng hoang (Feature); Những người đã gặp (Feature); Mẹ vắng nhà (Feature); Đường về Tổ quốc (Documentary); Nguyễn Ái Quốc đến với Lê-nin (Doc.); Phản bội (Documentary); Ông Trạng thả diều (Animated); Dế Mèn phiêu lưu ký (Animated)
- Festival date: May 12–19, 1980
- Website: 5th Vietnam Film Festival

Vietnam Film Festival chronology
- 6th 4th

The 5th Vietnam Film Festival was held from May 12 to May 19, 1980, in Hanoi, Vietnam, with the slogan: "For the Socialist Fatherland and the people's happiness. For the development of the national cinema" (Vietnamese: "Vì Tổ quốc xã hội chủ nghĩa và hạnh phúc của nhân dân. Vì sự phát triển của nền điện ảnh dân tộc").

== Event ==
The 5th Vietnam Film Festival was held on the occasion of the 90th birthday of President Hồ Chí Minh. This can be considered a successful film festival from the perspective of award-winning films, with the Golden Lotus feature films being "Cánh đồng hoang", "Mẹ vắng nhà", "Những người đã gặp" - the pinnacle of Vietnamese cinema after the war.

In particular, "Cánh đồng hoang", an excellent film, is still the Vietnamese film that won the highest award at an A-class international film festival, the Moscow International Film Festival.

There were 129 films in attendance at the Film Festival. Besides feature films, there are 3 Golden Lotus for documentary films and 2 Golden Lotus for Animated films.

The Festival went deeper into professional activities and paid attention to the quality of works when organizing a seminar "Striving to improve film quality" with the participation of a large number of film critics, filmmakers, writers, etc.

Audiences in Hanoi stayed up all night to gather at the August Cinema theater to ask for an increase in showings. In particular, two proms at Lenin Park attracted tens of thousands of people to respond and meet film artists.

== Awards ==
=== Feature film ===
| Award | | Winner |
|---|---|---|
| Film | Golden Lotus | Cánh đồng hoang Những người đã gặp Mẹ vắng nhà |
| Film | Silver Lotus | Mối tình đầu Tội lỗi cuối cùng Mùa gió chướng |
| Best Director | | Nguyễn Hồng Sến – Cánh đồng hoang, Mùa gió chướng Hải Ninh – Mối tình đầu |
| Best Actor | | Thế Anh – Mối tình đầu Lâm Tới – Cánh đồng hoang, Mùa gió chướng |
| Best Actress | | Thùy Liên – Mùa gió chướng, Vùng đất Củ Chi; Phương Thanh – Tội lỗi cuối cùng |
| Best Screenplay | | Nguyễn Quang Sáng – Cánh đồng hoang Bành Bảo – Những người đã gặp |
| Best Cinematography | | Đường Tuấn Ba – Cánh đồng hoang, Mùa gió chướng Trần Trung Nhàn – Những người đã gặp, Tội lỗi cuối cùng |
| Best Art Design | | Đào Đức – Mối tình đầu |
| Best Original Score | | Chu Minh – Mẹ vắng nhà |

=== Documentary/Science film ===
| Award | | Winner |
|---|---|---|
| Film | Golden Lotus | Đường về Tổ quốc Nguyễn Ái Quốc đến với Lê-nin; Phản bội |
| Film | Silver Lotus | Kỹ thuật cơ bản luồn sâu của đặc công Qua cơn vật vã Hình ảnh Quân đội số 5 - 1979; Chặng đường tới Điện Biên |
| Film | Jury's Merit | Cuộc chiến đấu trên cửa Nam Triệu; Chuyện kể từ đất Angkor; Chuyện mới ở Thủ Đức |
| Best Director | | Trần Văn Thủy – Phản bội Nguyễn Như Ái – Ong mắt đỏ |
| Best Original Score | | Đàm Linh – Nguyễn Ái Quốc đến với Lê-nin |

=== Animated film ===
| Award | | Winner |
|---|---|---|
| Film | Golden Lotus | Ông Trạng thả diều Dế Mèn phiêu lưu ký |
| Film | Silver Lotus | Anh bạn mũi dài Ba chú dê con Cún con làm nhiệm vụ Giải Nhất thuộc về ai Thành phố tuỳ ý muốn |
| Film | Jury's Merit | Em bé và chiếc gương Bộ đồ nghề nổi giận Chim vàng và hạt đỗ |
| Best Director | | Phạm Minh Trí – Giải Nhất thuộc về ai |
| Best Screenplay | | Hồ Quảng – Cún con làm nhiệm vụ |
| Best Key Animator | | Tô Ngọc Thành – Ông Trạng thả diều |
| Best Acting Animator | | Hồ Đắc Vũ – Dế Mèn phiêu lưu ký Trần Trọng Bình – Cún con làm nhiệm vụ |
