= Don't Burn =

- Đừng Đốt
- Directed by: Đặng Nhật Minh
- Written by: Đặng Nhật Minh
- Produced by: Hong Ngat Nguyen
- Starring: Minh Huong; Tina Duong; Michael Jarmus; Mathew M. Korsch; Patrick T. McGowan; Ben Rindner; Aryeh Sternberg; Brian Townes
- Cinematography: Duc Tung Vu
- Edited by: Anh Tu Tran
- Music by: Brothers Benedekfi; István Benedekfi; Zoltán Benedekfi
- Release date: 2009
- Country: Vietnam
- Language: Vietnamese

Don't Burn (Vietnamese: Đừng Đốt) is a 2009 Vietnamese historical drama film about Đặng Thùy Trâm written and directed by Đặng Nhật Minh. Starring Tina Duong, Minh Huong and Ben Rindner, the film premiered at the 19th Fukuoka International Film Festival in Japan, winning the audience prize. The film was released in Vietnam in late April 2009 and showed at the ASEM international film festival in Hanoi in mid-May 2009. It was also selected as Vietnam's entry for Best International Feature Film at the 82nd Academy Awards.

== Plot ==
Don't Burn follows an American soldier by the name of Fred Whitehurst, who was stationed in Vietnam from 1970–1972. While attacking a village, Fred finds a diary in an abandoned field hospital. With the help of a fellow soldier Huan, he starts translating the diary, which belonged to Dang Thuy Tram, a doctor who was positioned at the field hospital for several years. She describes in vivid detail the horrors she experienced during the war: her friends die around her every day, food is scarce, and she misses her family. As Fred continues to read about the horrific fate of the wounded soldiers Thuy treated, he starts to see the humanity of his enemy and starts to have nightmares of the people he and the US army have killed. Once Fred returns to the United States, his translation efforts continue with the help of his brother Robert's Vietnamese wife Mai. While the family's long history of military service in the US army initially clashes with the empathetic writing of their supposed enemy, they eventually grow to be inspired by Thuy's altruism. 35 years pass before Fred brings the diary to Texas Tech University for a seminar on the Vietnam War. There the diary is archived digitally and eventually returned to Thuy's surviving family.

== Production ==
At the end of 2005, Dang Thuy Tram's diary became a phenomenon in Vietnam. After a visit to the family of martyr Dang Thuy Tram, the idea of making a movie about Ms. Tram began to form in director Dang Nhat Minh's mind. He wanted to make a Vietnam War film different from the ones made before in Vietnam, one where neither the "enemy" nor the "allies" sides were evil. The director expressed that "In the whirlpool of war, people are only victims".

Đặng Nhật Minh traveled to North Carolina in 2005 to meet Fred Whitehurst before writing the film. When asked what had impressed Fred most about the diary, he claimed it was the passage "Và ai có biết chăng ai/ Tình thương đã chắp cánh dài cho ta…" which translates to "And do you know/ Love has given us wings..." Returning to Hanoi, he began to write the script for the film, which was initially called "there is fire in this".

== Cast ==
- Minh Huong
- Tina Duong
- Michael Jarmus
- Mathew M Korsch
- Patrick T
- McGowan
- Ben Rindner
- Aryeh Sternberg
- Brian Townes

== Awards ==
The film won the Golden Lotus for Best Feature Film, the Award for Best Screenplay at the 2009 Vietnam Film Festival as well as the Golden Kite Prize and Excellent Director award by Vietnam Cinema Association Awards in 2009.

It also won the audience award at the 2009 Fukuoka Film Festival.
