= Vietnam Film Festival =

Film festival in Vietnam

Liên hoan phim Việt Nam (Vietnam Film Festival)
- Location: Vietnam
- Founded: 17 August 1970; 56 years ago
- Awards: Golden Lotus
- No. of films: 74 in 2019
- Language: Vietnamese
- Website: Official Website

The Vietnam Film Festival (Vietnamese: Liên hoan phim Việt Nam), founded in 1970, is a domestic film festival of Vietnam. It is considered as the major event of Vietnamese cinema with awards for numerous categories ranging from feature film to documentary film, animated film. The festival is held for each two or three years in different host cities all over Vietnam.

== History ==
The first Vietnam Film Festival was held from August 18 to August 25, 1970, in Hanoi following an issue of Vietnamese Ministry of Culture with the purpose of "encouraging the development of the national cinema". For each festival, there are several juries of 7 to 11 members for different categories of feature film, direct-to-video, animated film and documentary film. The most prestigious prize of the festival is the Golden Lotus (Bông sen vàng) following by the Silver Lotus and the Jury Prize.

=== 1970–1975 period ===
During this period, film festivals were organized in a simple manner due to an ongoing war at the time. The first festival was held in 1970 with the criterion of summarizing four years of resistance against the US (1965–1969). The second festival in 1973 was just in time to celebrate the 20th anniversary of the Vietnamese Revolutionary Cinema. In addition to awarding awards to films produced after the first festival, the organizers also opened an award system for films produced before 1965.

=== 1976–1985 period ===
The 1977 film festival in Ho Chi Minh City was the first festival after the Reunification Day. From then until the 7th festival in 1985, the country struggled with economic difficulties. However, the film industry is still supported by the State. The film "When the Tenth Month Comes" directed by Đặng Nhật Minh emerged as a phenomenon, winning many domestic and international awards.

=== 1986–1999 period ===
This is the Renovated Era of the country with many economic and cultural reforms. During this period, feature films were no longer supported by the State as much as before, overwhelmed in number by the emerging direct-to-video feature film line. With the common theme of couple's love, the cast of young and beautiful actors, this type of film, although not of high artistic value, attracts a large number of fans. The film festival officially opened an award system for this type of film in 1990. Its heat peaked in 1993 but quickly faded into the past and was replaced by television series.

=== 2000–2013 period ===
The film industry during this period received many new trends with the participation of private studios. The number of feature films produced is higher than before, but the quality is often not high. The industry's human resources are in a struggle between old and new ways of thinking. Film festivals of this period received a lot of criticism in their organization for that reason.

=== 2014–present ===
The number of films produced during this period increased steadily over the years and the quality gradually improved. Film festivals are also more organized. Direct-to-video feature films were officially removed from the festival in 2017 by the organizers to focus entirely on the cinematic element. The festivals are held regularly every two years, alternating with the Hanoi International Film Festival.

Festival	Year	Host city	Note
1st Vietnam Film Festival	1970	Hanoi	
2nd Vietnam Film Festival	1973	Hanoi	
3rd Vietnam Film Festival	1975	Haiphong	
4th Vietnam Film Festival	1977	Ho Chi Minh City	
5th Vietnam Film Festival	1980	Hanoi	
6th Vietnam Film Festival	1983	Ho Chi Minh City	
7th Vietnam Film Festival	1985	Hanoi	
8th Vietnam Film Festival	1988	Đà Nẵng	
9th Vietnam Film Festival	1990	Nha Trang	
10th Vietnam Film Festival	1993	Haiphong	
11th Vietnam Film Festival	1996	Hanoi	
12th Vietnam Film Festival	1999	Huế	
13th Vietnam Film Festival	2001	Vinh	
14th Vietnam Film Festival	2004	Buôn Ma Thuột	
15th Vietnam Film Festival	2007	Nam Định	
16th Vietnam Film Festival	2009	Ho Chi Minh City	
17th Vietnam Film Festival	2011	Tuy Hòa	
18th Vietnam Film Festival	2013	Hạ Long	
19th Vietnam Film Festival	2015	Ho Chi Minh City	
20th Vietnam Film Festival	2017	Đà Nẵng	
21st Vietnam Film Festival	2019	Vũng Tàu	
22nd Vietnam Film Festival	2021	Huế	
23rd Vietnam Film Festival	2023	Đà Lạt	
24th Vietnam Film Festival	2025	Ho Chi Minh City	

== Programme ==
The Vietnam Film Festival is organized in various sections:

- Official Selection: The main event of the festival
  - In Competition: Films were selected to compete for the Golden Lotus Prize
  - Panorama Program: Films were not eligible to compete but selected to present to the public
  - Short Film section (expected)
  - First Film section (expected)
- Events
  - Film week to celebrate the Vietnam Film Festival
  - Seminar: Discussing issues of contemporary Vietnamese cinema
  - Exhibition: Exhibitions often have the theme of connecting cinema with the host city or an anniversary occasion
  - Exchanges: Artists with students, with the local public, with soldiers
  - Visit the scenic spots in the host province
- ASEAN Film Awards: The award was established in 2017 to celebrating the 50th anniversary of the founding of ASEAN

== Awards ==
The Film Festival's current awards are:

=== Official Selection: In Competition ===
- Golden Lotus for Best Film
- Silver Lotus
- Jury Prize (or Jury's Merit)
- Award for Best Director
- Award for Best Screenplay
- Award for Best Cinematography
- Award for Best Art Design
- Award for Best Original Score
- Award for Best Sound Design
- Award for Best Visual Effects

==== Feature film only ====
- Award for Best First Film Director
- Award for Best Actor
- Award for Best Actress
- Award for Best Supporting Actor
- Award for Best Supporting Actress
- Prospective Acting

==== Documentary/Science film only ====
- Award for Best Narrative

==== Animated film only ====
- Award for Best Shaping Animator
- Award for Best Acting Animator

=== Official Selection: Panorama Program ===
- Audience Choice Award for the Most Favourite Feature Film, voted by the audience

== Past awards ==
- Technique Award for the Feature showing new and impressive cinema technique. The award was only enabled in the 14th Vietnam Film Festival (2004).
- Press Choice Award for the Best Feature Film, voted by journalists. The award was only enabled in the 16th Vietnam Film Festival (2009).
- Best Film on the subject of War and Revolution, awarded by the General Department of Politics of the Vietnam People's Army. The award was only enabled in the 19th Vietnam Film Festival (2015).
- Grand Jury Prize (or Special Jury Prize), awards depending on the year.

== See also ==
- The Kite Awards, a film award organized by Vietnam Film Association
- Hanoi International Film Festival, former as Vietnam International Film Festival
- Vietnamese International Film Festival, a film festival organized in the United States
