= 1st Vietnam Film Festival =

1970 film festival

Liên hoan phim Việt Nam lần thứ 1 (1st Vietnam Film Festival)
- Location: Hanoi, Vietnam
- Founded: 1970
- Awards: Golden Lotus: Người chiến sĩ trẻ (Feature); Nguyễn Văn Trỗi (Feature); Nổi gió (Feature); 24 documentary films Con sáo biết nói (Animated); Mèo con (Animated)
- Festival date: August 17 - August 28, 1970
- Website: 1st Vietnam Film Festival

Vietnam Film Festival chronology
- 2nd Founded

The 1st Vietnam Film Festival was held from August 17 to August 28, 1970, in Hanoi, Vietnam, with the slogan "For the Fatherland - For Socialism" (Vietnamese: "Vì Tổ quốc - Vì chủ nghĩa xã hội").

== Event ==
The first Vietnamese film festival was organized by the Ministry of Culture and Information, the Vietnam Cinema Department and the Vietnam Cinema Association. With the criterion "Summarizing the cinematic works of the 4-year period against the Americans to save the country from 1965 to 1969", the festival aimed to encourage the work of composing and honor the outstanding works of Vietnamese artists in cinema field.

The opening ceremony was held at the August Cinema Theater. When the festival flag along with the national flag were raised, the film contest begins. The judges, included many famous people in the film industry as well as other art fields, were divided into three juries: feature film, documentary/science film and children/animated film. Members whose films are in attendance will not participate in voting for that film.

The closing and awarding ceremony were held in Vietnam Museum of Revolution. Everyone was gathered, listening to the name of the award ceremony. Awards include Golden Lotus, Silver Lotus and Certificate of Merit, no individual awards yet. The Golden Lotus is designed like a coin, as big as the mouth of a tea cup, embossed with a golden lotus. From the jury to the award-winning artist, no one received any monetary remuneration as well as material gifts, only such symbolic medals. 29 Golden Lotuses were awarded to 3 feature films, 24 documentary films and 2 animated films.

== Awards ==
=== Feature film ===
Award		Winner
Film	Golden Lotus	Người chiến sĩ trẻ Nguyễn Văn Trỗi; Nổi gió
Film	Silver Lotus	Rừng O Thắm; Cô giáo Hạnh; Biển gọi Trên vĩ tuyến 17
Film	Jury's Merit	Một chiến công

=== Documentary/Science film ===
Award		Winner
Film	Golden Lotus	Anh Nguyễn Văn Trỗi sống mãi; Bắn rơi chiếc máy bay thứ 2500; Chiến đấu giữ đảo quê hương; Chiến thắng Khâm Đức; Chiến thắng Tây Ninh; Dòng thác Bạc; Du kích Củ Chi; Đại hội thành lập chính phủ Cách mạng lâm thời Cộng hòa Miền Nam Việt Nam; Đánh tay không; Đầu sóng ngọn gió; Đội nữ pháo binh Long An; Đường ra phía trước; Đường qua Hà Tĩnh; Mỹ không chừa, Mỹ còn chết; Hà Nội lập công mừng thọ Bác Hồ; Một ngày trực chiến; Một ngày Hà Nội; Nghệ thuật tuổi thơ; Người Hàm Rồng; Những người mở đường; Quanh địa ngục Cồn Tiên; Quyết tâm đánh thắng giặc Mỹ xâm lược; Vài hình ảnh chiến thắng Khe Sanh; Vùng giải phóng miền Trung
Film	Silver Lotus	Anh pháo binh quân giải phóng; Bác chúc Tết không quân; Bác thăm trận địa phòng không; Bên bờ Bến Hải; Cá mè đẻ nhân tạo; Chiến thắng Dương Liễu - Đèo Nhông; Cô gái Thảo; Cồn Cỏ anh hùng; Đánh giáp lá cà đâm lê; Đại hội những người chiến thắng; Hà Tĩnh chống hạn đánh Mỹ; Hãy chặn tay bọn giết người; Hạt lúa vàng đai; Hào Lan cất cánh; Hóc đường thở; Hợp tác xã Hồng Thái làm thuỷ lợi; Lên đường hành quân; Lúa trên đất lửa; Ngọn đèn cửa biển; Những chiến sỹ hậu cần giỏi; Những người bảo vệ cầu Hàm Rồng; Phiên họp Hội đồng Chính phủ cuối năm; Quy hoạch đồng ruộng; Sống với những chiến sỹ Đắc Tô; Tập ảnh Thừa Thiên; Thả 3 tù binh Mỹ; Thời sự Tây Nguyên; Trận địa trên sông Cấm; Trên những chặng đường; Thăm quân y viện trên dãy Trường Sơn; Trường quân chính Nguyễn Thị Minh Khai; Vì tương lai con em chúng ta; Xiết chặt vòng vây
Film	Jury's Merit	Đòn trừng phạt đích đáng (Đồng Xoài rực lửa)

=== Animated film ===
Award		Winner
Film	Golden Lotus	Con sáo biết nói Mèo con
Film	Silver Lotus	Bài ca trên vách núi Những chiếc áo ấm
Film	Jury's Merit	Đêm trăng rằm Câu chuyện Thỏ Ngọc
