= The Abandoned Field: Free Fire Zone =

1979 film

- Directed by: Nguyễn Hồng Sến
- Written by: Nguyễn Quang Sáng
- Starring: Lâm Tới; Thúy An
- Cinematography: Đường Tuấn Ba
- Edited by: Nguyễn Kim Phượng; Lâm Trấn
- Music by: Trịnh Công Sơn
- Production company: Giai Phong Film Studio
- Distributed by: Giai Phong Film Studio; Phuong Nam Film
- Release date: 30 April 1979
- Running time: 90 minutes
- Country: Vietnam
- Language: Vietnamese

The Abandoned Field: Free Fire Zone (Vietnamese: Cánh đồng hoang) is a 1979 Vietnamese drama film directed by Nguyễn Hồng Sến. It won the Golden Prize and the Prix FIPRESCI at the 12th Moscow International Film Festival.

The film gives an "unnerving and compelling .. subjective-camera-eye-view" of life under helicopter fire in a free-fire zone in the Mekong Delta during the Vietnam War. The film cuts to an (American) "helicopter-eye view", contrasting painfully with the human tenderness seen earlier.

== Plot ==
The film completely takes place within the perimeter of an empty field, but it exploits both the space under the water (from under the water surface of the field) and the edges of the sky (where there are American warplanes conducting raids).

The setting is Dong Thap Muoi during the Vietnam War. Ba Do, his wife, and their young child live in a small shack amidst the water. They are tasked by the revolution with maintaining communication lines for the armed forces. The author emphasizes the daily life of the couple, such as planting rice, caring for their child, catching snakes, and fishing. Interspersed with these activities are raids by American military helicopters searching for guerrilla soldiers in the watery fields. When Ba Do is shot by an American helicopter, his wife shoots it down to avenge him.

At the end of the film there is a scene where a photograph of the shot pilot's wife and child falls from his chest. There were many suggestions to edit this scene from the film, however, it was still kept in order for people to see and understand American soldiers more clearly, they also are normal people, with a wife and child like Ba Do, but because of the war they had to be pulled from their families and put into Vietnam to fight.

== Cast ==
- Lâm Tới as Ba Do
- Nguyễn Thúy An as Sau Xoa
- De Xuan
- Chi Hong
- Robert Hải as Lieutenant Colonel Mistcher. Robert Hải (born Trần Hữu Hải; 1940–2000) was born in Hải Phòng and died in Ho Chi Minh City; he was of French and Italian parentage, with both parents having perished during the 1945 coup d'état.

== Production ==
Writer Nguyen Quang Sang—famous for The Ivory Comb (Chiếc lược ngà) and the screenwriter of this film—shared: "I had the idea for Cánh đồng hoang screenplay back in 1966; that year, I visited the Dong Thap Muoi battlefield and captured some unique images of the war there... yet it wasn't until December 18, 1978, that I actually began writing Cánh đồng hoang..."

The infant character in the film was played by Nguyen Van Thuan, the son of Nguyen Van Viet and the nephew of director Hong Sen. Thuan was only four months old when director Hong Sen scouted for actors, and nine months old when the film crew arrived to shoot. Today, Thuan is a millionaire living in Dong Thap Muoi.

The role of the wife was played by actress Thuy An, who was also director Hong Sen's wife. The Season of the Strong Wind (Mùa gió chướng) marked her entry into cinema (1978), followed by a string of films that became "blockbusters" of that era: The Face-Up Card (Ván bài lật ngửa), Saigon Commandos (Biệt động Sài Gòn), The Season of Rising Waters (Mùa nước nổi), and The Whirlwind Zone (Vùng gió xoáy)... In 1995, following director Hong Sen's passing, she trained as a jeweler and moved to Laos to make a living. She happened to meet her current husband there; they married and relocated to Frankfurt, Germany. She lives there with her husband and her daughter, Thuy Hong (her child with People's Artist Hong Sen).

As of 2003—when the film The Orphaned Monkey (Con khỉ mồ côi) was produced—Cánh đồng hoang remained the only screenplay Nguyen Quang Sang had written purely out of spontaneous inspiration, whereas most of his other scripts were commissioned or created during participation in creative workshops.
