= 17th Vietnam Film Festival =

Liên hoan phim Việt Nam lần thứ 17 (17th Vietnam Film Festival)
- Location: Tuy Hòa, Vietnam
- Founded: 1970
- Awards: Golden Lotus: Hoàng Sa trong lòng Tổ quốc (Documentary); Hồ Chí Minh - Cội nguồn cảm hứng sáng tạo (Direct-to-video Documentary); Bướm - Côn trùng cánh vảy (Science); Chiếc lá (Animated)
- Hosted by: Huy Khánh, Giáng My, Hồng Ánh, Xuân Bắc
- Festival date: December 14 - December 17, 2011
- Website: 17th Vietnam Film Festival

Vietnam Film Festival chronology
- 18th 16th

The 17th Vietnam Film Festival was held from December 14 to December 17, 2011, in Tuy Hòa City, Phú Yên Province, Vietnam, with the slogan "For a reformed and integrated Vietnam cinema" (Vietnamese: "Vì một nền điện ảnh Việt Nam đổi mới và hội nhập").

== Event ==
The 17th Vietnam Film Festival is one of the special cultural activities, responding to the National Tourism Year of the South Central Coast - Phú Yên 2011. It is an interesting coincidence that the 17th Vietnam Film Festival has exactly 17 feature films participating in the competition. In addition, the closing ceremony of the film festival also took place on December 17, 2011.

This year, no feature films were awarded gold. The jury awarded 4 Golden Lotuses for each category: Documentary Feature, Direct-to-video Documentary, Science film and Animated film.

=== Participation ===
Eligible films for the award are films released after the 16th Vietnam Film Festival until the deadline for the Organizing Committee to receive the registration form and attached documents is October 20. The deadline to receive films is from November 1 to 15.

The 17th Vietnam Film Festival attracted the participation of 108 films from 30 film establishments nationwide, including 17 feature films, 5 direct-to-video feature films, 10 documentary feature films, 52 direct-to-video documentary, 8 science films and 16 animated films.

=== Jury ===
In addition to the usual awards, at this festival, the award "Best Sound Design" was brought back but there will be no film award voted by the audience. The Film Festival will have only 3 Jury Panels (feature films, documentary - science and animated) instead 4 as before, each with at least 7 members. The feature film segment will be led by Director Lưu Trọng Ninh as Head of the Jury; Director Bùi Đình Hạc is the Head of the Jury for the Documentary - Science category and director Vũ Kim Dũng is the Head of the Animation Jury.

The jury team has also "makeover" and "rejuvenated" to the maximum. That more or less helps the public to be reassured by the proximity of contemporary Vietnamese cinema to the world, and at the same time affirms the innovative wind of national cinema.

=== Activities ===
All films participating in the 17th Vietnamese Film Festival will be screened from December 12, 2011 to December 17, 2011 at 4 locations: Hưng Đạo Cinema, Diên Hồng Cultural Center, Nha Trang Cinema Labor Culture, Multi-Language Department (under Thuan Thao Joint Stock Company). This is an opportunity for the public to approach and directly evaluate the films participating in the Festival. In addition, the Organizing Committee and the locality will organize outdoor movie screening spots at the April 1st Square so that the audience has the opportunity to enjoy the spectacular films that have been staged so far, meeting the movie viewing needs of a large number of people. audience and "warm up" the atmosphere during the Film Festival.

Within the framework of the festival, in addition to general activities such as opening, closing and awarding ceremonies, there are also various activities such as:

- Seminar "Vietnamese Cinema - Current situation and solutions" (Vietnamese: "Điện ảnh Việt Nam thực trạng và giải pháp")
- Seminar "Sharing on cinema development policy" (Vietnamese: "Chia sẻ về chính sách phát triển điện ảnh") with the participation of speakers Simon Christopher, policy maker of European cinema development and Ms. Kim Jung Ah, General Director in charge of Cinema, CJ Media Group (South Korea)
- An exhibition with the theme "Four Decades of Vietnam Film Festival"
- The event "Cinema artists do charity" for people with meritorious services to the revolution, the poor, disabled children
- Incense offering ceremony at Uncle Hồ's pavilion and Nhạn Mountain Martyrs' Monument
- Visiting to Phú Yên scenic spots to promote tourism
- Exchanges between artists and soldiers of the Airborne Regiment 910, students of Phú Yên University, audiences and ethnic minorities in Hai Riêng town, Sông Hinh district.

The opening ceremony took place at 8 pm on December 15 at Sao Mai Theater, Tuy Hòa city, Phú Yên province and was broadcast live on VTV2 channel of Vietnam Television. Leaving the most emotions in the opening night was the part honoring generations of actors through four periods of Vietnamese cinema. More than 3,000 spectators present in the hall of Sao Mai Theater as well as television viewers were able to look back at the faces of artists who have made great contributions to the country's cinema from the first days until today.

The closing ceremony and awarding ceremony took place at 8 pm on December 17 and was broadcast live on VTV1 channel.

=== Inadequacy ===
In the ceremony honoring the artists who made the 40-year history of the Vietnam Film Festival, it seems that the animators still occupy a too modest position. Not many animators were honored, and this number is not enough compared to the fact that many people have worked hard to make Vietnamese animation during the past 40 years. Meanwhile, Phi Thanh Vân and Mai Thu Huyền, two actors who have not contributed much, were honored alongside other veteran names of the film industry, making the public and the press react.

The glitches in the awards night, from movies or individuals who are not nominated and still receive the award, or there is only one general introduction clip playing for all the nominations. The clip was even used to illustrate the singer's performance, causing an offensive feeling. For example, when the singer sings a song about love on stage on stage, the image shown on the 5 large LED screens behind is a scene from a revolutionary war movie with a shooting scene.

In addition, the poor joke from two MCs Huy Khánh and Hồng Ánh has left undue bad impressions on the film festival.

== Official Selection ==
=== Feature film ===
Original title	English title	Director(s)	Production
Cánh đồng bất tận	The Floating Lives	Nguyễn Phan Quang Bình	BHD
Cô dâu đại chiến	Battle of the Brides	Victor Vu	Galaxy Studio
Công chúa teen và Ngũ Hổ Tướng	Teen Princess and the Five Brave Generals	Lê Lộc	Phước Sang Film
Để Mai tính	Fool for Love	Charlie Nguyễn	Wonderboy Entertainment
Hoa đào	Peach Blossoms	Nguyễn Thế Vinh	Feature Film Studio I
Hot boy nổi loạn và câu chuyện về thằng Cười, cô gái điếm và con vịt	Lost in Paradise	Vũ Ngọc Đãng	BHD
Khi yêu đừng quay đầu lại	Don't Look Back	Nguyễn Võ Nghiêm Minh	Galaxy Studio
Long thành cầm giả ca	The Musician at the Dragon Citadel	Đào Bá Sơn	Giải Phóng Film
Mùi cỏ cháy	The Scent of Burning Grass	Hữu Mười	VFS
Nhìn ra biển cả	Ocean View	Vũ Châu	Hodafilm
Những bức thư từ Sơn Mỹ	Letters From Sơn Mỹ	Lê Dân	Lê Dân JSC
Những nụ hôn rực rỡ	Burning Kisses	Nguyễn Quang Dũng	BHD
Tâm hồn mẹ	Mother's Soul	Phạm Nhuệ Giang	VFS
Tây Sơn hào kiệt	Heroes of the Tây Sơn Dynasty	Phượng Hoàng, Lý Hùng	Lý Huỳnh Film, Youth Film Studio
Thiên sứ 99	Angel 99	Nguyễn Minh Cao	Phước Sang Film
Vũ điệu đam mê	Passionate Dance	Nguyễn Đức Việt	Galaxy Studio
Vượt qua bến Thượng Hải	Across the Shanghai Bund	Triệu Tuấn, Fan Dongyu	Vivafilm

Highlighted title indicates Golden Lotus winner but no winner declared this year.

== Awards ==
=== Feature film ===
Award		Winner
Film	Golden Lotus	not awarded
Film	Silver Lotus	The Scent of Burning Grass; Lost in Paradise; Passionate Dance
Film	Jury's Merit	Mother's Soul; The Musician at the Dragon Citadel; The Floating Lives
Best Director		Vũ Ngọc Đãng – Lost in Paradise
Best Actor		Quách Ngọc Ngoan – The Musician at the Dragon Citadel
Best Actress		Ninh Dương Lan Ngọc – The Floating Lives; Nguyễn Mỹ Hạnh – Passionate Dance
Best Supporting Actor		Hồ Vĩnh Khoa – Lost in Paradise
Best Supporting Actress		Phương Thanh – Lost in Paradise; Lê Khánh – Battle of the Brides
Best Screenplay		Hoàng Nhuận Cầm – The Scent of Burning Grass
Best Cinematography		Nguyễn Nam – Lost in Paradise; Nguyễn K'Linh – Battle of the Brides
Best Art Design		Nguyễn Trung Phan, Nguyễn Mạnh Đức – The Musician at the Dragon Citadel
Best Original Score		Võ Thiện Thanh, Huy Tuấn – Burning Kisses
Best Sound Design		Bành Bắc Hải – Passionate Dance
Prospective Director Prize of Vietnam Cinema Assoc.		Nguyễn Quang Dũng – Burning Kisses

==== Direct-to-video ====
Award		Winner
Film	Golden Lotus	not awarded
Film	Silver Lotus	not awarded
Film	Jury's Merit	Rượu cần đêm mưa Vũ khúc ánh trăng

=== Documentary/Science film ===
==== Documentary film ====
Award		Winner
Film	Golden Lotus	Hoàng Sa trong lòng tổ quốc
Film	Silver Lotus	Sóng nhà giàn Người thắp lửa
Film	Jury's Merit	Gươm đàn Thăng Long; Từ Thác Bà đến Sơn La
Best Director		Lưu Quỳ – Hoàng Sa trong lòng tổ quốc
Best Cinematography		Vương Khánh Trần Linh – Từ Thác Bà đến Sơn La

==== Direct-to-Video ====
Award		Winner
Film	Golden Lotus	Hồ Chí Minh - Cội nguồn cảm hứng sáng tạo
Film	Silver Lotus	Chuyện ông Hội đồng Bạn thờ ơ với nó
Film	Jury's Merit	Thả một bè lau Xe ôm

==== Science film ====
Award		Winner
Film	Golden Lotus	Bướm - Côn trùng cánh vảy
Film	Silver Lotus	Rừng Cà Mau kể chuyện
Film	Jury's Merit	Gầm ghì trắng
Best Director		Trịnh Quang Tùng, Bùi Thị Phương Thảo – Bướm - Côn trùng cánh vảy
Best Screenplay		Nguyễn Thu Tuyết – Bướm - Côn trùng cánh vảy

=== Animated film ===
Award		Winner
Film	Golden Lotus	Chiếc lá
Film	Silver Lotus	Người con của Rồng; Quái vật hồ sen
Film	Jury's Merit	Giấc mơ Loa thành Vũ điệu ánh sáng
Best Director		Phạm Hồng Sơn – Chiếc lá
Best Screenplay		Nguyễn Thu Trang – Chiếc lá
Best Shaping Animator		Phạm Ngọc Tuấn – Chiếc lá
Best Acting Animator		The Animator Crew of Vũ điệu ánh sáng
Best Original Score		Đặng Hữu Phúc – Người con của Rồng
Best Sound Design		Bành Bắc Hải – Chiếc lá, Giấc mơ Loa thành
