= 22nd Vietnam Film Festival =

Liên hoan phim Việt Nam lần thứ 22 (22nd Vietnam Film Festival)
- Location: Huế, Vietnam
- Founded: 1970
- Awards: Golden Lotus: Mắt biếc (Feature); Ranh giới (Documentary); Điểm mù giao thông (Science); Con chim gỗ (Animated)
- Hosted by: Đức Bảo, Lương Thùy Linh
- Festival date: November 18 - November 20, 2021

Vietnam Film Festival chronology
- 23rd 21st

The 22nd Vietnam Film Festival was held from November 18 to November 20, 2021, in Huế City, Thừa Thiên Huế Province, Vietnam, with the slogan "Building a Vietnamese film industry rich in national identity, modern and humane" (Vietnamese: "Xây dựng nền công nghiệp điện ảnh Việt Nam giàu bản sắc dân tộc, hiện đại và nhân văn"). It was originally scheduled to be held in September 2021 but had to be moved to November due to the impact of the COVID-19 pandemic.

== Event ==
The 22nd Vietnam Film Festival is a national art and culture event to celebrate the country's major holidays in 2021, especially implementing the Resolution of the 13th Party Congress. This is also an opportunity for artists and filmmakers to continue implementing the approved project to build and promote the national brand of the Vietnam Film Festival in the 2021-2030 period.

This year, for the first time, the festival has two more awards besides the usual award system: Best First Film Director and Best Visual Effects.

In the end, 4 Golden Lotus award were given to films in categories: feature film, documentary film, science film and animated film.

=== Participation ===
Films for the contest include feature films, documentaries, animated films, and science films, licensed for distribution from September 11, 2019, to August 10, 2021. Films participating in the festival must be Vietnamese-language films, produced by Vietnamese film establishments or in cooperation with foreign organizations and individuals, without copyright disputes.

In addition, films participating in this festival must be works that have not yet attended the 21st Vietnam Film Festival and the National Television Festival, and do not violate the Intellectual Property Law and related regulations. Remake films (based on scripts, foreign films) can register to attend the festival's programs. In case the film is selected for the contest round, individual awards for director, actor, painter, cinematographer, sound and music will be considered.

The organizers do not award awards to remake movies and screenplay writers. The last date to receive applications to attend the Festival is August 15. The last date to receive the film is September 20.

From 141 films submitted for participation, the Organizing Committee selected 128 films from 48 units, including: 26 feature films, 56 documentaries, 15 scientific films, and 31 animated films. In which, 17 feature films, 37 documentaries, 15 scientific films, 23 animated films will participate in the Competition Program, the rest will be under the Panorama Program.

=== Juries ===
The jury panels of the 21st Vietnam Film Festival were announced on November 18.

The Feature Film jury consists of 9 members:

- Director Nguyễn Vinh Sơn (Head)
- Composer Đỗ Trường An
- Director, Cinematographer Phạm Việt Thanh
- Director Lương Đình Dũng
- Screenwriter, Producer Nguyễn Thị Hồng Ngát
- Actress, Producer Trương Ngọc Ánh
- Director Lý Minh Thắng
- Art Designer Phạm Quốc Trung
- Journalist Trần Hữu Việt

The Documentary & Science Film jury consists of 7 members:

- Director Lê Hồng Chương (Head)

The Animated Film jury consists of 5 members:

- Director, Animator Nguyễn Thị Phương Hoa (Head)
- Composer Giáng Son

=== Activities ===
Due to the impact of the COVID-19 epidemic, although there are still some activities held in person, most of the programs to interact with the audience and show introductory films within the framework of the film festival are in online form.

Feature films participating in the film festival that are screened in the program "Welcome to the 22nd Vietnam Film Festival" will be broadcast on the digital platform VTVGo (for movies that are allowed to be shown online) from November 10 to November 16.

From November 14 to 20, Huế audiences can watch movies, with the condition that they comply with the 5K distancing regulations, at 4 cinemas as follows:

- Đông Ba cinema (187 Trần Hưng Đạo street)
- BHD Cineplex (Vincom Plaza, 50A Hùng Vương street)
- Cine Star (25 Hai Bà Trưng street)
- Lotte Cinema (4th floor, BigC Huế Building, 181 Bà Triệu street)

The films were also broadcast on the digital platform VTVGo (for movies that are allowed to be shown online).

The opening and closing ceremonies of this year's film festival were shortened. The opening and press conference ceremony was incorporated in the press conference, taking place at Silk Path Hotel, Huế city and 9 am on November 18, 2021. The announcement and award ceremony of the Film Festival took place at Song Huong Theater, inside the Huế Academy of Music, and was broadcast live at 20:10 on November 20, 2021 on VTV1 channel Vietnam Television, Thừa Thiên-Huế Radio and Television Station and on VTVGo platform.

The festival also includes many side programs:

- Exhibition "Thua Thien-Hue - Destination of filmmakers" (Vietnamese: "Thừa Thiên-Huế - Điểm đến của các nhà làm phim"), hosted by the Vietnam Film Institute
- Exhibition "The Heritage and You" (Vietnamese: "Di sản và Bạn"), hosted by the Department of Tourism of Thừa Thiên-Huế province, held both offline and online, at Huế Academy of Music and Điềm Phùng Thị Art Space
- Ao dai show "Ao Dai with Cinema" took place on the evening of November 18 in the campus of Huế Academy of Music
- The tour "Discover the film set in Hue with the five-body ao dai" (Vietnamese: "Khám phá bối cảnh phim trường ở Huế cùng áo dài ngũ thân")

== Official Selection ==
=== Feature film ===
==== In Competition ====
Original title	English title	Director(s)	Production
Bằng chứng vô hình	Invisible Evidence	Trịnh Đình Lê Minh	CJ HK Entertainment, HK Film
Bình minh đỏ	Red Dawn	Nguyễn Thanh Vân	Hodafilm
Bố già	Dad, I'm Sorry	Vũ Ngọc Đãng, Trấn Thành	Trấn Thành Town, HKFilm, Galaxy Studio
Chị Mười Ba: 3 ngày sinh tử	13th Sister: Three Deadly Days	Võ Thanh Hòa	Galaxy M&E
Con đường có mặt trời	Sunshine All the Way	Vũ Anh Nhất	People's Army Cinema
Cơn giông	Thunderstorm	Trần Ngọc Phong	Giải Phóng Film
Gái già lắm chiêu V: Những cuộc đời vương giả	Camellia Sisters	Nam Cito, Bảo Nhân	Mar6 Pictures
Khúc mưa		Bùi Tuấn Dũng	People's Army Cinema
Kiều	Kiều	Mai Thu Huyền	Tincom Media
Lính chiến		Nguyễn Mạnh Hà	Feature Film Studio I
Mắt biếc	Dreamy Eyes	Victor Vu	Galaxy M&E, November Films
Miền ký ức	Memoryland	Bùi Kim Quy	(independent film)
Nắng 3: Lời hứa của cha	Sunshine 3: The Father's Promise	Đồng Đăng Giao	ABC Pictures
Ngốc ơi tuổi 17	Silly 17	Chu Thiện, Đinh Tuấn Vũ	Midia
Ròm	Ròm	Trần Dũng Thanh Huy	HKFilm, Red Ruby, East Films
Tiệc trăng máu	Blood Moon Party	Nguyễn Quang Dũng	Lotte Entertainment Việt Nam, Anh Tễu Studio, HKFilm, Sidus Vietnam
Võ sinh đại chiến	Great War of Pupils	Nguyễn Bá Cường	DC Entertainment

Highlighted title indicates Golden Lotus winner.

==== Panorama Program ====
There were 9 films officially selected for this program but later, 2 of them withdrew. Award for the most favorite film voted by the audience was not presented this year.

Original title	English title	Director(s)	Production
Cậu Vàng		Trần Vũ Thủy	Bùi Cường Film
Điên tối	Darkness	Jack Carry On	Viettel Media
Đôi mắt âm dương	The Eyes	Nhất Trung	ABC Pictures, NT Studio
'em' LÀ CỦA em		Lê Thiện Viễn	Lê Đào Media, V Pictures, BLE Entertainment, Y&K Entertainment, Mega GS
Sám hối		Peter Hein	Anh Sao Production
Song song		Nguyễn Hữu Hoàng	CJ HK Entertainment, Wallsound
Vào đời		Síu Phạm	VIET MY'S FILM, T&T

== Awards ==
=== Feature film ===
Award		Winner
Film	Golden Lotus	Dreamy Eyes
Film	Silver Lotus	Dad, I'm Sorry
Film	Jury's Merit	Camellia Sisters; Red Dawn
Film	Special Prize for Film Set in Huế (Note: Awarded by Thừa Thiên-Huế Provincial People's Committee)	Dreamy Eyes
Best Director		Trịnh Đình Lê Minh – Invisible Evidence
Best Actor		Tuấn Trần – Dad, I'm Sorry
Best Actress		Lê Khanh – Camellia Sisters
Best Supporting Actor		Otis Đỗ Nhật Trường – Invisible Evidence
Best Supporting Actress		Nguyễn Ngọc Ngân Chi – Dad, I'm Sorry, Sunshine 3: The Father's Promise
Best Screenplay		Trấn Thành, Bùi Trương Hữu Nhi, Hồ Thúc An – Dad, I'm Sorry
Best Cinematography		Nguyễn Vinh Phúc – Ròm; Dominic Pereira – Dreamy Eyes
Best Art Design		Phạm Hùng – Camellia Sisters
Best Original Score		Christopher Wong – Dreamy Eyes
Best Sound Design		Peter Mulheron – Invisible Evidence
Best Visual Effects		not awarded
Best First Film Director		not awarded

=== Documentary/Science film ===
==== Documentary film ====
Award		Winner
Film	Golden Lotus	Ranh giới
Film	Silver Lotus	Phim đỏ Ánh sáng của con
Film	Jury's Merit	Mầm xanh đất lửa Nữ du kích Sông Hương
Best Director		Tạ Quỳnh Tư – Ranh giới, Nẻo đường hội ngộ
Best Screenplay		Nguyễn Hạnh Lê – Kỳ tích chinh phục một dòng sông
Best Cinematography		Lê Duy Hồi, Hà Hải Long – Lá cờ trên Phu Văn Lâu
Best Sound Design		Chu Đức Thắng, Đào Thị Hằng – Mầm xanh đất lửa

==== Science film ====
Award		Winner
Film	Golden Lotus	Điểm mù giao thông
Film	Silver Lotus	Lũ miền núi
Film	Jury's Merit	Ca trù vọng tiếng ngàn năm
Best Director		Trịnh Quang Tùng – Lũ miền núi
Best Screenplay		Lê Danh Trường – Tắc mạch xạ trị
Best Cinematography		Công Sơn, Dương Huy, Tuấn Anh – Ô nhiễm trắng
Best Sound Design		Hữu Bính, Xuân Phương – Ca trù vọng tiếng ngàn năm

=== Animated film ===
Award		Winner
Film	Golden Lotus	Con chim gỗ
Film	Silver Lotus	Người thầy của muôn đời Ánh sáng không bao giờ tắt
Film	Jury's Merit	Bí mật của khu vườn Mái tơ phúc hậu
Best Director		Trần Khánh Duyên – Con chim gỗ
Best Screenplay		Bùi Hoài Thu – Người thầy của muôn đời
Best Shaping Animator		Lê Bình – Bí mật của khu vườn
Best Acting Animator		The Animator Crew of Người thầy của muôn đời
Best Original Score		Đặng Duy Chiến – Ánh sáng không bao giờ tắt
Best Sound Design		Nguyễn Hồng Quân – Ánh sáng không bao giờ tắt
Best Animated Effects		Nguyễn Quang Trung – Mảnh ghép của Rồng
