= 18th Vietnam Film Festival =

Liên hoan phim Việt Nam lần thứ 18 (18th Vietnam Film Festival)
- Location: Hạ Long, Vietnam
- Founded: 1970
- Awards: Golden Lotus: Những người viết huyền thoại (Feature); Scandal: Bí mật thảm đỏ (Feature); Người cộng sự (Direct-to-video Feature); Có một cơ hội bị bỏ lỡ (Documentary); Bí mật từ những pho tượng Phật (Science); Bò vàng (Animated)
- Hosted by: Bình Minh, Giáng My, Anh Quân
- Festival date: October 14 - October 16, 2013
- Website: 18th Vietnam Film Festival

Vietnam Film Festival chronology
- 19th 17th

The 18th Vietnam Film Festival was held from October 14 to October 16, 2013 in Hạ Long City, Quảng Ninh Province, Vietnam, with the slogan "Vietnamese Cinema - Ethnicity, Humanity, Creativity, Integration" (Vietnamese: "Điện ảnh Việt Nam - Dân tộc, Nhân văn, Sáng tạo, Hội nhập").

== Event ==
The Film Festival was held in the year that celebrates 60 Years since Uncle Hồ signed the Decree of Establishing the Vietnam Revolutionary Film Industry. It had an outstanding number of entries compared to other film festivals.

At the end of the film festival, the Golden Lotus Award was given to all categories: "Bò vàng" (Animated Film), "Bí mật từ những pho tượng Phật" (Science Film), "Có một cơ hội bị bỏ lỡ" (Documentary film), "Người cộng sự" (Direct-to-video Feature film), "Những người viết huyền thoại" and "Scandal: Bí mật thảm đỏ" (Feature film).

=== Participation ===
The 18th Vietnam Film Festival has the participation of 44 cinema establishments across the country with 139 films. In which, there are 23 feature films, 6 direct-to-video feature films, 10 documentary feature films, 62 direct-to-video documentary, 12 science films, and 26 animated films.

Films released after the 17th Vietnam Film Festival until the submission deadline of September 5, 2013 are eligible to participate.

=== Jury ===
The 18th Vietnam Film Festival has 3 jury panels for feature films; documentary - science films and animated films. Each panel will vote by secret ballot to propose the award decision for each type of film according to regulations. Members of the Jury voted for all the awards as prescribed in the 18th Vietnam Film Festival's Charter and scored as follows: Golden Lotus - score 9.1 to 10; Silver Lotus - score 8.1 to 9.0; Jury Prize - score 7.1 to 8.0; Movie not voted - score below 7.1.

In the feature film category, there are 9 members of the jury chaired by director Đào Bá Sơn. Other members are: writer Chu Lai, screenwriter Đinh Thiên Phúc, director Hồ Quang Minh, cinematographer Phạm Thanh Hà, painter Nguyễn Trung Phan, composer Đỗ Hồng Quân, actress Nguyễn Lan Hương, director Hoàng Anh.

In the documentary and science category, there are 7 members of the jury chaired by director Đặng Xuân Hải. Other members are: screenwriter Đoàn Minh Tuấn, director Vũ Thị Lệ Mỹ, director Lê Hồng Chương, director Bùi Đắc Ngôn, director Trần Tuấn Hiệp, journalist Tô Hoàng.

In the animated film category, there are 5 members of the jury chaired by director/animator Nguyễn Thị Phương Hoa. Other members are: writer Trần Ninh Hồ, director Đào Minh Uyển, musician Doãn Nguyên, journalist Chu Thu Hằng.

=== Activities ===
To prepare for the 18th Vietnam Film Festival, the Organizing Committee organized "Welcome Film Week of the XVIII Vietnam Film Festival" taking place from September 23, 2013 to September 29, 2013 in Hanoi, Da Nang and Ho Chi Minh City (Hanoi: at the National Cinema Center, 87 Láng Hạ; Đà Nẵng: at Lê Độ Theater, 46 Trần Phú; Hồ Chí Minh City: at Galaxy Cinema Kinh Dương Vương, 718bis Kinh Dương Vương, District 6). This is also the time when the "unknowns" are released and answered before the audience before the 18th Vietnam Film Festival takes place.

During the three days of the festival, besides the opening, closing and awarding ceremonies, film artists will participate in the following activities:

- Doing charity at the Center for the Protection of Children with Special Circumstances in Quảng Ninh Province
- Exchange with workers of Cửa Ông Coal Recruitment Company; officers and soldiers of Quảng Ninh province.
- Seminar "Cinema with Quảng Ninh and tourism promotion through cinema" (Vietnamese: "Điện ảnh với Quảng Ninh và quảng bá du lịch qua điện ảnh")
- Seminar "Development of film production and distribution cooperation" (Vietnamese: "Phát triển hợp tác sản xuất và phát hành phim")

The film festival organizers also cooperated with Quảng Ninh Department of Culture, Sports and Tourism to open the exhibition "Cinema with Quảng Ninh" displaying images from typical films about the land and people of Quảng Ninh.

The Opening Ceremony was broadcast live on VTV1 channel at 20:00 on October 12 and the Closing/Awarding Ceremony was broadcast live on VTV2 channel at 20:00 on October 15. The general director of both ceremonies is director Le Quý Dương.

=== Inadequacy ===
From a professional perspective and event organization, the 18th Vietnam Film Festival is considered to be quite pale and inadequate. The place where the opening and closing night took place, although in an international amusement park, was narrow, with few spectators, most of which were officials and artists.

Side activities have not yet made a strong impression on people who are interested in cinema with seminars that lack novelty on "coordination of film production and distribution", "promotion of tourism through cinema". The cinemas are small (both Hạ Long theater and Phương Nam theater have about 200 seats each), the sound system is not really perfect.

== Official Selection ==
=== Feature film ===
Original title	English title	Director(s)	Production
Cát nóng	Hot Sand	Lê Hoàng	Giải Phóng Film
Cưới ngay kẻo lỡ	Love Puzzle	Charlie Nguyễn	Chánh Phương Film, Galaxy Studio
Đam mê	Passion	Phi Tiến Sơn	Feature Film Studio I
Dành cho tháng Sáu	Of Us and June	Nguyễn Hữu Tuấn	(independent film)
Đường đua	The Race	Nguyễn Khắc Huy	Blue Productions
Giấc mộng giàu sang		Nguyễn Công Hậu	Nghiệp Thắng Co. Ltd, Vinacinema
Hello cô Ba	Hello Miss Ba	Nguyễn Quang Minh	Phước Sang Film
HIT: Hoàng Tử & Lọ Lem		Ngô Quang Hải	Vimax Films
Hiệp sĩ Guốc Vông		Nguyễn Chánh Tín	Chánh Tín Film
Khùng		Đỗ Mai Nhất Tuấn	
Lạc lối	Aimless	Phạm Nhuệ Giang	(independent film)
Lấy chồng người ta	In the Name of Love	Lưu Huỳnh	VI-PHIM Studio
Lửa Phật	Once Upon a Time in Vietnam	Dustin Nguyễn	BHD
Mùa hè lạnh	Cold Summer	Ngô Quang Hải	Adam Corp
Những người viết huyền thoại	The Legend Makers	Bùi Tuấn Dũng	VFS
Nhà có 5 nàng tiên	Five Fairies in the House	Trần Ngọc Giàu	Golden Screen Production
Ranh giới trắng đen	Black and White	Najantolisa	Nghiệp Thắng Co. Ltd, Vinacinema
Sau ánh hào quang		Lê Hữu Lương	Phúc An Nam Co. Ltd
Scandal: Bí mật thảm đỏ	Scandal	Victor Vu	Galaxy Studio, Saiga Films
Săn đàn ông		Võ Quốc Thành, Khánh Ly	Vo Quoc Thanh Entertainment Co.
Thiên mệnh anh hùng	Blood Letter	Victor Vu	Phương Nam Film, Saiga Films, Thanh Niên Film
Và anh sẽ trở lại	And I Will Come Back	Đinh Tuấn Vũ	SAA Productions
Yêu anh! Em dám không?		Nguyễn Quang Minh	Phước Sang Film

Highlighted title indicates Golden Lotus winner.

== Awards ==
=== Feature film ===
Award		Winner
Film	Golden Lotus	The Legend Makers; Scandal
Film	Silver Lotus	Aimless; Blood Letter
Film	Jury's Merit	And I Will Come Back; Of Us and June
Film	Audience Choice	Five Fairies in the House; The Legend Makers
Best Director		Victor Vu – Scandal, Blood Letter
Best Actor		Trương Minh Quốc Thái – The Legend Makers
Best Actress		Vân Trang – Scandal; Tăng Bảo Quyên – The Legend Makers
Best Supporting Actor		Thái Hòa – Once Upon a Time in Vietnam
Best Supporting Actress		Nguyễn Thuỳ Linh – And I Will Come Back
Best Screenplay		Nguyễn Anh Dũng – The Legend Makers
Best Cinematography		Nguyễn Hữu Tuấn – Aimless; Kieran Daniel Fowler – The Race
Best Art Design		Nguyễn Nguyên Vũ – The Legend Makers
Best Original Score		Bảo Chấn – Passion
Best Sound Design		Franck Desmoulins – Aimless, Passion

==== Direct-to-video ====
Award		Winner
Film	Golden Lotus	Người cộng sự
Film	Silver Lotus	Nước mắt người cha
Film	Jury's Merit	Suối nguồn Bản tình ca màu xanh
Best Director		Trần Trung Dũng – Nước mắt người cha
Best Actor		Huỳnh Đông – Người cộng sự
Best Actress		Takei Emi – Người cộng sự
Best Supporting Actor		Lê Chí Kiên – Nước mắt người cha
Best Supporting Actress		Hồng Thy – Suối nguồn
Best Screenplay		Nguyễn Thu Dung, Trần Trung Dũng, Nguyễn Trực – Nước mắt người cha
Best Cinematography		Nguyễn Mai Hiền, Ryuta Hoshi – Người cộng sự
Best Art Design		Đặng Trọng Tuân, Morihiro Miyazaki – Người cộng sự

=== Documentary/Science film ===
==== Documentary film ====
Award		Winner
Film	Golden Lotus	Có một cơ hội bị bỏ lỡ
Film	Silver Lotus	Ký ức một thời Chuyện dài ở bệnh viện
Film	Jury's Merit	André Menras - Một người Việt; Câu chuyện về ngôi nhà An Phúc
Best Director		Nguyễn Mộng Long, Uông Thị Hạnh – Có một cơ hội bị bỏ lỡ
Best Screenplay		Đào Thanh Tùng – André Menras - Một người Việt
Best Cinematography		Trần Xuân Trung – Người thả chiều vào tranh
Best Sound Design		Dương Thế Vinh – Ký ức một thời

==== Science film ====
Award		Winner
Film	Golden Lotus	Bí mật từ những pho tượng Phật
Film	Silver Lotus	Mùa chim làm tổ
Film	Jury's Merit	Bản đồ tư duy - Một hành trình kết nối Điện gió
Best Director		Nguyễn Hoàng Lâm – Bí mật từ những pho tượng Phật
Best Screenplay		Nguyễn Hoàng Lâm – Bí mật từ những pho tượng Phật
Best Cinematography		Chu Vui, Tài Văn, Đức Hiếu – Mùa chim làm tổ

=== Animated film ===
Award		Winner
Film	Golden Lotus	Bò vàng
Film	Silver Lotus	Trần Quốc Toản; Khoảng trời
Film	Jury's Merit	Bù nhìn rơm Càng to càng nhỏ
Best Director		Trần Khánh Duyên – Bò vàng
Best Screenplay		Nguyễn Thu Trang – Bù nhìn rơm
Best Shaping Animator		Lê Bình – Trần Quốc Toản
Best Acting Animator		The Animator Crew of Hào khí Thăng Long
Best Original Score		Ngọc Châu – Đôi bạn
Best Sound Design		Nguyễn Chí Hoàng Nam – Xin chào bút chì
