= Midu =

Midu or MIDU may refer to:

- Midu County, Yunnan, China
- Midu language, a possibly Sino-Tibetan language spoken in border regions of India and China
- Midu (actress) (born 1989), Vietnamese actress
- MIDU, ticker symbol for the Direxion Daily Mid Cap Bull 3X Shares ETF
- Midu, the main character of the Pakistani television series Anokha Ladla

== See also ==
- Midus, a type of Lithuanian mead
- Midou, a river in France
- Meedhoo (disambiguation)
