= University of Theatre and Cinema Ho Chi Minh City =

Theatre college in Vietnam

- Vietnamese: Trường Đại học Sân khấu – Điện ảnh Thành phố Hồ Chí Minh
- Other names: SKDAHCM
- Type: Public; Drama school; Film school
- Established: 2009 - The University of Theater and Cinema Ho Chi Minh City; 1977 - Vietnam School of Cinema in Ho Chi Minh City; 1976 - School of Dramatic Arts II
- Affiliations: Ministry of Culture, Sports and Tourism
- President: Merited Artist Lê Nguyên Đạt (2023-2028)
- Principal: Dr Phạm Huy Quang
- Location: 125 Cống Quỳnh Road, Cầu Ông Lãnh ward, Ho Chi Minh City, Vietnam; 10°46′N 106°42′E
- Campus: 4,282.4 m^{2} (1.0582 acres) or 3,832.4 m^{2} (0.9470 acres); Urban
- Language: Vietnamese
- Website: skdahcm.edu.vn

The University of Theatre and Cinema Ho Chi Minh City (Vietnamese: Trường Đại học Sân khấu – Điện ảnh Thành phố Hồ Chí Minh) is a public university in Ho Chi Minh City, Vietnam. Founded in 2009, the university provides further and higher education courses in performing arts and filmmaking. The institution is affiliated with and governed by Vietnam's Ministry of Culture, Sports and Tourism. The university is often seen as a leading film school in Vietnam.

== History ==
The University of Theatre and Cinema Ho Chi Minh City was established in 2009 as a merger of two predecessor institutions - The Vietnam School of Cinema in Ho Chi Minh City (founded in 1977) and The School of Dramatic Arts II (founded in 1976). Under the higher education system in Vietnam, the university is affiliated with and governed by the Ministry of Culture, Sports and Tourism, though it is a separate legal entity, with its own seal and financial account. The university's founding charter was signed 13 October 2009 by Deputy Prime Minister Nguyễn Thiện Nhân.

=== Reputation ===
Many of the university's alumni have gone on to become well-known figures in the entertainment industry in Vietnam (see Notable alumni). In addition, its students and alumni have received national and global recognitions. In Vietnam, alumni of the university have been nominated for and won prestigious national awards such as the Kite Awards and the Golden Lotus Prize, as well as receiving honorary titles of Merited Artist (Nghệ sĩ ưu tú) and People's Artist (Nghệ sĩ nhân dân).

Students and alumni of the institution have also won recognitions at international film festivals. Some notable recent achievements are:

- 2025 Asian Film Awards - Best new director nomination for alumn Minh Quy Truong
- 2025 New York Asian Film Festival - Special Jury Award for alumn Võ Điền Gia Huy (actor), of the entry On Ao Tuoi Tre (Skin of Youth)
- 2020 Busan International Film Festival - ArteKino International Prize for alumn Le Binh Giang (director)
- 2019 Busan International Film Festival - New Currents Award for Ròm, directed by alumn Tran Thanh Huy, who had also won several awards during his time as a university student
- 2019 Oxford International Short Film Festival - Best actress for alumna Nhã Phương, of the entry Infill & Full set, which was also premiered at the 2018 Cannes Film Festival.

=== Preserving and promoting traditional Vietnamese theatre ===
The university has an academic department dedicated to traditional Vietnamese musical theatre, with a special focus on Cải lương - a type of folk opera indigenous to Southern Vietnam. As part of its initiatives to preserve this art form, students who enrol in a Cải lương programme would receive a 70% deduction in tuition fee, as well as receiving designated career support. The university's work in Cải lương has received international recognition. In 2025, its production entitled Eclipse won four medals at China-ASEAN Theatre Week in Nanning, China.

However, it has been suggested that more could be done in preserving traditional Vietnamese theatrical practices, including art forms other than Cải lương. One criticism of the university's Cải lương programme is that it only trains students in singing and performing but not script-writing. Additionally, the university also no longer offers programmes in make-up and costume design, which has a knock-on impact on traditional theatres since they are important aspects of these genres. Another shortcoming of the university's work in preserving traditional theatre lies in its difficulty in recruiting students wishing to study these art forms: the application deadline for the Cải lương programme has had to be extended, for example. The shortage of demand to study traditional theatre has also been said to stop the university, and other institutions, from offering specialist programmes. "The [Ho Chi Minh] City University of Theatre and Cinema does not have a major in hát bội because no one is currently pursuing this form of art. So it is impossible to have a degree in this classical opera genre", said a director of a major theatre in Ho Chi Minh City.

=== Controversy ===
As is the case for all universities in Vietnam, the university is subject to regular inspections by the Ministry of Education and Training. An inspection in 2025 criticised the university for the lack of highly qualified teaching staff with doctorate degrees, particularly in the Stage Directing and Cinematography departments, where no teaching staff held doctorate degrees. The inspection report also condemned the university's practice of employing teaching staff with only Master's and Bachelor's qualifications, whose level of expertise and experience was called into question. Additionally, the inspector also criticised poor administration at the university, where signatures for important paperwork were missing, and inconsistent record of university's campus size.

== Academic programmes ==
As of 2025, the university offers bachelor's degrees (bằng cử nhân) in the following programmes:

- Acting (theatre, film, and television)
- Directing (film and television) - also available for part-time students
- Directing (theatre)
- Cinematography

The university also offers associate degrees (bằng cao đẳng), in the following fields:

- Photography
- Design for stage and screen
- Acting in Southern Vietnam Folk Opera (Cải lương)

=== Partner institutions ===
The university has collaborated with a number of institutions around the world, including the following:

- Central Academy of Drama (Beijing, China)
- Dankook University (Seoul, South Korea)

== Campus life ==
The university organises an annual pageantry-like competition for students, entitled "Elegant Students". The tradition started in 2005 (before the merger that led to the foundation of the university), and a special 20th anniversary edition of the competition was held between November 2025 and January 2026.

Students at the university also benefits from events and seminars with guest speakers from the entertainment industry. Some recent guest speakers were Iranian director Reza Dormishian (in 2017) and Vietnamese-American director Victor Vu (in 2025). The university has also hosted a number of film festivals, notably the Ho Chi Minh City Short Film Festival in 2023 and the Italian Film Festival in 2024 and 2025 (in the latter of which the university was an official partner).

== Notable alumni ==
This list includes alumni of the predecessor institutions, The National University of Filmmaking in Ho Chi Minh City and The University of Dramatic Arts II.

- Hồ Vĩnh Khoa, actor, known for his role in Lost in Paradise.
- Hồng Đào [vi] - Actress, known for appearance on the Netflix series Beef (2023)
- Minh Quý Trương - Director, known for the award-winning and critically acclaimed film Viet and Nam (2024)
- Nguyễn Thị Minh Ngọc [vi] - Director, author, and screenwriter
- Nguyễn Trần Khánh Vân - Model and influencer, known for winning Miss Universe Vietnam 2019 and for reaching top 21 in Miss Universe 2020
- Ninh Dương Lan Ngọc - Actress, known for starring in The Floating Lives (2010) and The Tailor (2017)
- Phương Anh Đào [vi] - Actress, known for starring in Glorious Ashes (2022) and Mai (2024)
- Quoc Huy [vi] - Actor, known for starring in Detective Kien: The Headless Horror (2025)
- Trấn Thành - Actor, comedian, TV presenter, producer; director of box office hits Dad, I'm Sorry (2021) and Mai (2024)
- Võ Điền Gia Huy [vi] - Actor, known for starring in the award-winning film Goodbye Mother (2019)
