= List of Vietnamese films of 2014 =

This is a list of Vietnamese films which were released in 2014:

Title	Director	Cast	Genre	Notes
Battle of the Brides 2 (Cô dâu đại chiến 2)	Victor Vũ	Bình Minh, Lan Phương, Lê Khánh, Vân Trang, Maya	comedy	
Hollow	Ham Tran	Nguyễn Ngọc Hiệp	horror	
Năm sau con lại về	Trần Ngọc Giàu	Hoài Linh, Việt Anh, Thanh Thủy, Lê Khánh, Chí Tài	comedy	
Nước (2030)	Nguyễn Võ Nghiêm Minh	Quynh Hoa, Quy Binh, Kim Long Thach	drama	
Vengeful Heart (Quả tim máu)	Victor Vũ	Nhã Phương, Thái Hòa, Quý Bình		
Melodies of Life	Lien Mya Nguyen	Lien Mya Nguyen, Stephen Oost, Chris Rennirt	drama	
The Last Journey of Madam Phung	Nguyễn Thị Thắm		documentary	,
The Scent of Fish Sauce	Trinh Dinh Le Minh	Gayland Williams, Dillon Cavitt, Tram Ly		
Xui mà hên	Ethan Tran	Ethan Tran, Hieu Hien	comedy	

== Links ==
- Vietnamese Films at Internet Movie Database
