= 19th Vietnam Film Festival =

Liên hoan phim Việt Nam lần thứ 19 (19th Vietnam Film Festival)
- Opening film: Cuộc đời của Yến
- Location: Ho Chi Minh City, Vietnam
- Founded: 1970
- Awards: Golden Lotus: Tôi thấy hoa vàng trên cỏ xanh (Feature); Đỉnh cao chiến thắng (Documentary); Bản hòa tấu Sơn Đoòng (Science); Cậu bé cờ lau (Animated)
- Hosted by: Thành Lộc, Thu Hằng, Mỹ Linh
- Festival date: December 1–5, 2015
- Website: 19th Vietnam Film Festival

Vietnam Film Festival chronology
- 20th 18th

The 19th Vietnam Film Festival was held from December 1 to December 5, 2015, in Ho Chi Minh City, Vietnam, with the slogan "Vietnamese Cinema - Ethnicity, Humanity, Creativity, Integration" (Vietnamese: "Điện ảnh Việt Nam - Dân tộc, Nhân văn, Sáng tạo, Hội nhập").

== Event ==
At this Film Festival, for the first time, there is a selection round for entries in all genres: feature films, documentaries, science films and animated films. Also for the first time, films participating in the Vietnam Film Festival are divided into categories: films in Competition and films in the Panorama program. For the first time, the model of film production ordered by the State combined with the social capital of private film studios achieved high social and economic efficiency.

The jury awarded 4 Golden Lotus for the categories: Feature Film, Documentary, Science Film and Animated Film.

=== Participation ===
Notably, the 2015 Vietnam Film Festival was the first time that a selection committee was established to select films for competition and show, not all units sent to participate.

From hundreds of films submitted for selection, the 19th Film Festival's Selection Committee has selected 125 films of various genres, from 41 film production units across the country to be included in 2 sections: “Films in Competition” (92 films) and “Films shown in the Panorama program” (33 films).

Among the 92 entries, there are 20 feature films, 6 direct-to-video feature films, 6 documentary feature films, 27 direct-to-video documentary, 10 science films, and 23 animated films. Films for this year's competition are films produced by cinema establishments and licensed for popularization from September 1, 2013, to October 10, 2015.

The new feature of this film festival is the Panorama Program section (Vietnamese: "Toàn cảnh điện ảnh Việt Nam"). The program will show to the public the films that attended the festival but were not eligible and not selected for the competition list (15 feature films and 18 direct-to-video documentary films). However, there are still 2 award for the most favorite film in this section along with the "Film In Competition" section, voted by the audience.

In addition, to celebrate the 85th anniversary of the founding of Vietnam Communist Party, 40 years of Southern Liberation Day - National Reunification and 70 years of August Revolution and National Day, the General Department of Politics of the Vietnam People's Army (Vietnamese: Tổng cục chính trị Quân đội nhân dân Việt Nam) had given the award for the "Best Film on War and Revolution".

=== Jury ===
This year's film festival continues to have 3 jury panels like previous years.

The jury in the Feature Film category includes: director Vũ Xuân Hưng (Head), director/actor Lê Cung Bắc, director Đặng Tất Bình, writer Nguyễn Đông Thức, screenwriter Lưu Nghiệp Quỳnh, composer Phú Quang, cinematographer Vũ Đức Tùng, painter Lã Quý Tùng and actress Vân Trang.

In the Documentary - Scientific Film category, the jury includes: Doctor/Film Critic Trần Luân Kim (Head), director Vũ Lệ Mỹ, director/cinematographer Nguyễn Quốc Thành, journalist Ngô Ngọc Ngũ Long and director Đoàn Hồng Lê.

In the Documentary - Scientific Film category, there are 5 members of the jury: director/animator Nguyễn Hà Bắc (Head), director/animator Nguyễn Thị Phương Hoa, writer Đoàn Thạch Biền, songwriter Nguyễn Quỳnh Hợp and journalist Chu Thị Thu Hằng.

=== Activities ===
A notable activity to prepare for the film festival is the Welcoming 19th Vietnam Film Festival Film Week. The opening starts at 19:30 pm on November 18, 2015, at the National Cinema Center (Hanoi) with the film "Cuộc đời của Yến" and Lê Độ Cinema (Đà Nẵng City) with the film "Người trở về".

According to the schedule, there will be two seminars to take place:

- "Brand building, position of Vietnamese films" (Vietnamese: "Xây dựng thương hiệu, vị thế của phim Việt Nam")
- "Supporting policies and preferential measures for the development of the film industry" (Vietnamese: "Chính sách hỗ trợ và biện pháp ưu đãi phát triển nền công nghiệp điện ảnh"), with the participation of speakers, filmmakers from UK, USA, Denmark, Canada, Hong Kong (China), Philippines and Vietnam

Along with that, there were 3 exchanges including:

- Film artists with students
- Film artists with soldiers of the Division 9, Corps 4 in Củ Chi
- Meeting with artists participating in works on the theme of Liberation of the South and reunification of the country.

In Ho Chi Minh City, during the five days of the festival (from December 1 to December 5), in addition to feature films in the competition section, the audience also enjoyed free films in the Panorama Program section at BHD cinemas (February 3 Street, District 10), CGV Hùng Vương (District 5), Galaxy Nguyễn Du (District 1), Mega GS Cao Thắng (District 3). According to the organizers, tickets for the welcome film week as well as at the festival are distributed at the screening venue 1–2 days before each film is shown.

The opening ceremony took place at 19:00 on December 1 at Hòa Bình Theater (Ho Chi Minh City), broadcast live on channel VTV1. The closing/awarding ceremony took place at Hoa Binh Theater at 20:00 on December 5, which will be broadcast live on channel VTV6.

=== Critical Reviews ===
The 19th Vietnam Film Festival received more positive reviews than previous festivals. The plus point for the 19th Vietnam Film Festival is that it has selected many good films to participate in the competition. Through the selection round, the categories of films submitted to the competition were diverse, with many quality films appearing and avoiding the "catastrophic" films like many previous festival seasons.

In particular, the maturity of the young film crew has added a new voice next to the previous seniors. Another factor is that overseas Vietnamese filmmakers return to their home country to establish their careers, making the Vietnamese film market more vibrant and remarkable.

== Official Selection ==
=== Feature film ===
==== In Competition ====
Original title	English title	Director(s)	Production
Bước khẽ đến hạnh phúc	Gently Walk to Happiness	Lưu Trọng Ninh	Hồng Ngát Film, VietMe Film
Chàng trai năm ấy	Dandelion	Nguyễn Quang Huy	WePro Entertainment, Galaxy Studio
Cuộc đời của Yến	Yen's Life	Đinh Tuấn Vũ	VFS
Dịu dàng	Gentle	Lê Văn Kiệt	Coco Paris Media
Đập cánh giữa không trung	Flapping in the Middle of Nowhere	Nguyễn Hoàng Điệp	(independent film)
Đường xuyên rừng	Road Through the Forest	Xuân Cường	Giải Phóng Film
Hương ga	Rise	Cường Ngô	Media Village, TNA Entertainment
Lạc giới	Paradise in Heart	Phi Tiến Sơn	Tincom Media
Mỹ nhân	Beautiful Woman	Đinh Thái Thụy	Giải Phóng Film
Người trở về	Returnee	Đặng Thái Huyền	People's Army Cinema
Nhà tiên tri	The Prophecy	Vương Đức	VFS
Những đứa con của làng	The Children of the Village	Nguyễn Đức Việt	Hồng Ngát Film
Nước 2030	2030	Nguyễn Võ Nghiêm Minh	Saigon Media
Quyên	Farewell, Berlin Wall	Nguyễn Phan Quang Bình	BHD
Scandal: Hào quang trở lại	Scandal 2	Victor Vu	Galaxy Studio, Early Risers Media Group
Sống cùng lịch sử	Live With History	Nguyễn Thanh Vân	VFS
Thầu Chín ở Xiêm	Ho Chi Minh in Siam	Bùi Tuấn Dũng	Hodafilm
Tôi thấy hoa vàng trên cỏ xanh	Yellow Flowers on the Green Grass	Victor Vu	Galaxy M&E, Saigon Concert, Phương Nam Film
Trên đỉnh bình yên	On the Peaceful Peak	Hữu Mười	Feature Film Studio I
Trúng số	Jackpot	Dustin Nguyễn	Dreamscape D.B.S

Highlighted title indicates Golden Lotus winner.

==== Panorama Program ====
Original title	English title	Director(s)	Production
49 ngày	49 Days	Nhất Trung	NT Studio
Bộ ba rắc rối	Triple Troubles	Võ Tấn Bình	Chánh Phương Film, CJ Entertainment
Cầu vồng không sắc	Rainbow Without Colours	Nguyễn Quang Tuyến	Leo Media & Technology
Cô dâu đại chiến 2	Battle of the Brides 2	Victor Vu	Galaxy Studio, Saiga Films
Chung cư ma	Hush	Văn M. Phạm	Skyline Media
Để Mai tính 2	Let Hoi Decide	Charlie Nguyễn	CJ Entertainment, Chánh Phương Film
Đoạt hồn	Hollow	Hàm Trần	BHD
Em là bà nội của anh	Sweet 20	Phan Gia Nhật Linh	CJ Entertainment, HKFilm
Hiệp sĩ mù	Blind Warrior	Lưu Huỳnh	VI-PHIM Entertainment
Kungfu phở		Nguyễn Quốc Duy	Skyline Media
Lật mặt	Face Off	Lý Hải	Lý Hải Productions
Ma dai	Tenacious Ghost	Trần Nguyễn Hoàng Duy, Đỗ Đức Thịnh	Thiên Phúc Entertainment
Ngủ với hồn ma		Nguyễn Bá Vũ	Skyline Media
Quả tim máu	Vengeful Heart	Victor Vu	Poseidon Media Group
Thần tượng	The Talent	Nguyễn Quang Huy	WePro Entertainment

Highlighted title indicates the most favorite film voted by the audience.

== Awards ==
=== Feature film ===
Award		Winner
Film	Golden Lotus	Yellow Flowers on the Green Grass
Film	Silver Lotus	The Children of the Village; Yen's Life
Film	Jury's Merit	Returnee; Ho Chi Minh in Siam; Jackpot
Film	Best Film on War and Revolution	The Prophecy; Road Through the Forest
Film	Audience Choice	Yellow Flowers on the Green Grass; Sweet 20
Best Director		Victor Vu – Yellow Flowers on the Green Grass
Best Actor		Trung Anh – The Children of the Village
Best Actress		Thúy Hằng – The Children of the Village, Yen's Life
Best Supporting Actor		Huy Cường – The Children of the Village; Thanh Duy – Flapping in the Middle of Nowhere
Best Supporting Actress		Kim Hiền – Beautiful Woman
Best Screenplay		Đinh Thiên Phúc – Ho Chi Minh in Siam; Nguyễn Thu Dung, Đặng Thái Huyền – Returnee
Best Cinematography		Vũ Quốc Tuấn – The Prophecy, Yen's Life; Nguyễn K'Linh – Scandal 2, Yellow Flowers on the Green Grass
Best Art Design		Nguyễn Dân Nam – The Children of the Village, Yen's Life
Best Original Score		Lê Cát Trọng Lý – Yen's Life
Best Sound Design		The Sound Crew from Crane Song Group – 2030

==== Direct-to-video ====
Award		Winner
Film	Golden Lotus	not awarded
Film	Silver Lotus	Đất lành
Film	Jury's Merit	Siêu quậy lên chùa
Best Director		Đặng Thái Huyền – Đất lành
Best Actor		not awarded
Best Actress		Nguyễn Thu Thủy – Đất lành

=== Documentary/Science film ===
==== Documentary film ====
Award		Winner
Film	Golden Lotus	Đỉnh cao chiến thắng
Film	Silver Lotus	Cỏ xanh im lặng Triết gia Trần Đức Thảo suy tư cùng thế kỷ
Film	Jury's Merit	Trường Sa - Việt Nam; Giọt nước giữa đại dương 30/4 - Ngày thống nhất
Best Director		Đào Thanh Tùng – Triết gia Trần Đức Thảo suy tư cùng thế kỷ
Best Screenplay		Đào Trọng Khánh – Giọt nước giữa đại dương
Best Cinematography		Dương Văn Huy – Người bản Hốc
Best Sound Design		Trần Kiên – Đỉnh cao chiến thắng

==== Science film ====
Award		Winner
Film	Golden Lotus	Bản hòa tấu Sơn Đoòng
Film	Silver Lotus	Chúa sơn lâm sau song sắt Sinh ra trong mùa nổi
Film	Jury's Merit	Ứng dụng công nghệ ECMO tại Việt Nam; Hậu cần trong tác chiến vùng đồng nước
Best Director		Nguyễn Hoàng Lâm – Bản hòa tấu Sơn Đoòng
Best Screenplay		Tạ Thị Huệ – Ứng dụng công nghệ tế bào gốc chữa bệnh
Best Cinematography		Nguyễn Tài Việt, Dương Văn Thuận – Nhanh và chậm
Best Sound Design		Dương Thế Vinh – Chúa sơn lâm sau song sắt

=== Animated film ===
Award		Winner
Film	Golden Lotus	Cậu bé cờ lau
Film	Silver Lotus	Đàn sếu có trở về Những mặt phẳng
Film	Jury's Merit	Bay về phía bầu trời Người cha
Best Director		Phùng Văn Hà – Cậu bé cờ lau
Best Screenplay		Phạm Thị Thanh Hà, Phạm Đình Hải – Những mặt phẳng
Best Shaping Animator		Lý Thu Hà – Cậu bé cờ lau
Best Acting Animator		The Animator Crew of Cậu bé cờ lau
Best Original Score		Lương Ngọc Châu – Người cha, Quả cầu nổi
Best Sound Design		Nguyễn Duy Long – Những mặt phẳng
