= Phạm Việt Anh Khoa =

- Born: May 11, 1981 (age 45); Ho Chi Minh City, Viet Nam
- Occupation: Film producer
- Years active: 2008 - present
- Notable work: Inferno (2010), Battle of the Brides (2011), Blood letter (2012), Scandal (2012), Battle of the Brides 2 (2013) and The Mask (2016)

Phạm Việt Anh Khoa (born May 11, 1981) is a Vietnamese movie producer, entrepreneur and founder of Saiga Films, notable for producing some of Victor Vu's films, including Inferno (2010), Battle of the Brides (2011), Blood Letter (2012), Scandal (2012) and Battle of the Brides 2.

== Filmography ==
- Inferno, a.k.a. Giao Lo Dinh Menh (2010)
- Battle of the Brides (2011)
- Blood Letter (2012)
- Scandal (2012)
- Battle of the Brides 2 (2013)
- The Mask (2016)
