= Nguyễn Thụy Anh =

Vietnamese author

- Born: Nguyễn Thụy Anh; 5 April 1974; Hanoi, Vietnam
- Occupations: Author, translator
- Writing career
- Pen name: Thụy Anh, Hữu Phúc; Papa Tấn, Mạc Thủy; Song Anh, NTA, TA
- Genres: Romance, children
- Notable work: My Olga Bergholz
- Movement: Neo-romanticism
- Website: Facebook Thica Thivien

Nguyễn Thụy Anh is a Vietnamese woman author.

After school, Anh became a freelancer for Hanoi's magazine Mother and Child (Mẹ và Bé). She founded the club Reading Books with Our Children (Câu lạc bộ Đọc Sách Cùng Con) as the chairwoman.

== Works ==
Anh has been known much as the poet with many "As Bergholz" poems for women and children.

=== Poem ===
- Lilac (Tử đinh hương) : Love poems.
- The hedgehog (Nhim nhỉm nhìm nhim) : Poems for children, Young Publishing House, 2014.
- Yore, nowaday, futurology (Ngày xưa, ngày nay, ngày sau) : Poems for children, Young Publishing House, 2014.
- Tiger mom is sweet (Mẹ hổ dịu dàng) : Poems for children, Young Publishing House, 2014.
- Hilarity with Vietnamese language (Vui cùng tiếng Việt) : Poems for children, Young Publishing House, 2014.

=== Literature ===
- 100 grams of happiness (100 gram hạnh phúc) : Dissertations, Young Publishing House, 2013.

=== Translation ===
- My Olga Berggoltz (Olga Berggoltz của tôi) : Olga Berggoltz's works to Vietnamese language, Young Publishing House, 2010.
- Night watch (Tuần đêm) : Sergei Lukyanenko's to Vietnamese, Young Publishing House, 2010.
- Day watch (Tuần ngày) : Sergei Lukyanenko's to Vietnamese, Young Publishing House, 2017.

== Sources ==
- Gia đình gắn kết khi cha mẹ dành thời gian cho con
- Giáo dục trẻ không phải là uốn cây cảnh theo ý mình
- Các em nhỏ không thờ ơ với sách
- Nguyen-thuy-Anh's books for children
