= Thanh Hằng =

Vietnamese actress and supermodel

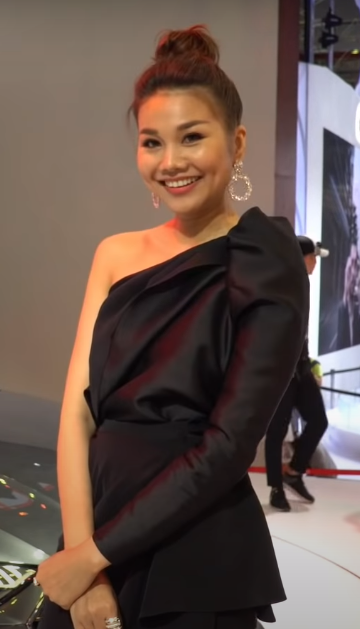
- Born: Phạm Thị Thanh Hằng; 22 July 1983 (age 43); Da Nang, Vietnam
- Occupations: Supermodel, actress, singer, host, reality show judge
- Height: 1.78 m (5 ft 10 in)
- Beauty pageant titleholder
- Title: Miss Model Photogenic 2001
- Major competitions: Miss Model Photogenic 2001 (Winner); Miss Intercontinental 2005 (Unplaced)
- Website: thanhhang.jimdo.com

Phạm Thị Thanh Hằng (born 22 July 1983) is a Vietnamese actress, supermodel and beauty pageant titleholder.

After winning the Miss Vietnam through pictures (in 2002), Hằng stepped into professional modelling. She was invited to be the judge for the Vietnam's Next Top Model seasons 4, 6, 7 & 9.

== Career ==
- 2001: Crowning of Miss Model Photogenic.
- 2004: Her first film that was filmed and also her first film role was in Những cô gái chân dài.
  In particular, she won the "Best Model 2004".
- 2005: She representing Vietnam for the Miss Intercontinental contest.
- 2006: She appeared in her first television drama Tuyết nhiệt đới. In the series: Thanh Hằng played Lam–a young poet, who is moody. For her, a life full of both material and spiritual will bring her a deadlock in the path of poetry. So Lam left to find inspiration for creation, creating waves for her love affair with Hải (Lương Mạnh Hải).
- 2007: She appeared in the drama Tôi là ngôi sao. In the series: Thanh Hằng played two sisters with opposite characters, Khánh Hà and Vân Hà.
- 2008: She appeared in the drama Gia tài bác sĩ. Thanh Hằng succeeded in becoming the character of Hạnh – a physician dedicated to the profession and played the role of An in the film Kiss of the Death that helped bring her Mai Vang Award for movie actress favourite five.
- 2010: She became the judge of Mister Vietnam. She also appeared in the film Burning Kisses as Thanh Lam, a goofy but passionate singer and dancer. Thanh Hằng spent a long time practicing dance techniques. She also was invited to become Vietnam's representative at Miss Universe 2010 but refused due to lack of time.
- 2011: She judged in Siêu mẫu Việt Nam and appeared in the drama Người mẫu. In the drama: Thanh Hằng played the role model supermodel and designer Binh Khôi.
- 2013: Filmed Mỹ nhân kế as Kiều Thị.
  She judged at the reality television series Vietnam's Next Top Model cycle 4.
- 2015: She became the judge and presenter of Vietnam's Next Top Model cycle 6 and starred at the film Siêu Nhân X.
- 2016: She continued to become judges and host of Vietnam's Next Top Model cycle 7 and the female lead in the music video for "Tháng tư là lời nói dối của em" (Hà Anh Tuấn).
- 2017: Thanh Hằng appeared in the film with the role of Ba Trân in Mẹ chồng which marked her return to acting and continue to be the female lead in another music video.

== Awards ==
- Miss Model Photogenic 2001
- "Excellent model" in 2004-05
- Top 15 Miss Intercontinental in 2005
- 2006 "Best Model" Award
- Top 30 medals (all kinds) on the ball sport
- Golden Apes for An in Kiss of the Death
- "Star of the Year" (Star Newspaper.Net 2013)
- HTV Awards "Most Favourite Model 2015"
- Wechoice Award (TV Show Judge category)
- and many other big and small awards

== Filmography ==
=== Music videos ===
- "Hãy mặc em đi" – Hồ Ngọc Hà
- "Tháng 4 là lời nói dối của em" – Hà Anh Tuấn
- "Tái bút anh yêu em" – Hà Anh Tuấn
- "Em À" – Hà Anh Tuấn

=== Short films ===
- The new woman in you

=== TV series ===
- Tuyết nhiệt đới – as Lam
- Tôi là ngôi sao – as Khánh Hà và Vân Hà
- Gia tài bác sĩ – as Hạnh
- Người mẫu – as Bình Khôi

=== Films ===
- Những cô gái chân dài (2004) – as Ngọc Mai
- Kiss of the Death (2008) – as An
- Burning Kisses – as Thanh Lam
- Mỹ nhân kế (2013) – as Kiều Thị
- Siêu Nhân X (2015) – as Kỳ Kỳ
- Mẹ chồng (2017) – as Ba Trân
- Tháng năm rực rỡ (2018) – as Mỹ Dung
- Chị chị em em (2019) – as Thiên Kim

== Discography ==
=== Music videos ===
- Ngày mới và em
- Xuân hạnh phúc

=== Songs to series ===
- Nhan sắc
- Vào Hạ
- Em Vẫn Muốn Yêu Anh – with Hồ Ngọc Hà
- Ngày mới
- Giấc Mơ Ngôi Sao
- Get High
