= Đặng Quang Dũng =

Vietnamese comic artist (born 1992)

Mèo Mốc
- Born: Đặng Quang Dũng; October 21, 1992 (age 33); Hà Tĩnh province
- Occupation: Comic book artist
- Writing career
- Pen name: Mèo Mốc
- Period: 2014-present
- Genre: Comic book
- Subjects: Children; Teenagers
- Notable works: Nhật Ký Mèo Mốc; Tây Du Hí; Ly & Chũn; Nào ta cùng ăn
- Notable awards: De Men Award 2021; Forbes Vietnam's 30 Under 30 (former)

Đặng Quang Dũng (born October 21, 1992), known professionally as Mèo Mốc or "Mok", is a Vietnamese comic artist and graphic designer. He is best known for writing comics for all ages, most notably Nhật ký Mèo Mốc (Diary of Meo Moc), as well as Tây Du Hí (Humorous Journey to the West) and Ly & Chũn (Ly & Chun). Altogether, he has published 20 books and many other web comics. He is considered as the most commercially successful comic artist in Vietnam.

== Biography ==
Đặng Quang Dũng was born in 1992 in Hà Tĩnh province, Vietnam, later moved to Hà Nội with his family during the 90s. He started picking up drawing comics as a hobby as early as elementary school, initially redrawing pages from Doraemon comic books so that he could share them with his classmates. He attended Foreign Trade University for a bachelor in International Economics before attending LASALLE College of the Arts in Singapore in 2015. After graduation he worked as a creative writer at Google Singapore before returning to Vietnam to continue his work as a comic book writer.

== Pen name ==
Dũng is better known by his pen name Mèo Mốc, which means Moc the Cat (sometimes Mok the Cat). The pen name originated from his old nickname, Black Mokona, which he used when active as a hobbyist comic artist on the internet during high school. Dũng has shortened the name Mokona into Mốc, and combined it with Mèo (Vietnamese for "cat", his favorite animal) to form the new pen name Mèo Mốc. The pen name is also used to name the main character of his comic book series Nhật ký Mèo Mốc, which is based on his real-life events.

In 2016, when writing a short comic called Lửa (Flare) for an online comic contest, Dũng used a new pen name called Nyomm.

== Writing career ==
Đặng Quang Dũng began his career as a freelance comic book writer in 2011 at a local comic book company. His job was to write and illustrate some small gag comic strips, as well as to illustrate children's picture books. It was during this time that Dũng started his own webcomic series, later known as Nhật ký Mèo Mốc (Diary of Meo Moc).

Nhật ký Mèo Mốc was originally created as a visual diary so Dũng could share with his friends on Facebook what happened around him everyday through a comical lens. His mascot and also his pen name, Mèo Mốc was the main character in this first series. After going viral, the series was adapted to its first volume in Oct 2014 by SkyComics. The first volume stayed as a best-seller on Tiki, Vietnamese e-commerce platform, for several months. As of 2023, there are 7 volumes of the Mèo Mốc series with roughly 80,000 copies sold nationally.

Tây Du Hí, created in 2015, was Dũng's second comic book series as a professional writer. On its first two volumes and the first half of volume 3, the story was presented in yonkoma format. On the 3rd volume, Dũng decided to depart from writing another comedy series, saying it is too similar to the Mèo Mốc series. This resulted in a much heavier tone in the second half of volume 3, and starting from volume 4 the story is presented in traditional comic format with a long run adventure/action storyline. As of 2021, there are six volumes of Tây Du Hí being released with roughly 45,000 copies having been sold nationally.

In 2019, he released a new comic book titled Nào ta cùng ăn! (Let's eat!). This entry marks a milestone in his career, being his 10th published comic book, his first standalone comic book and his first comic book published by Nha Nam Publishing and Communications JSC.

In 2021, he released Ly & Chũn - Tết là nhất, nhất là Tết! (Ly & Chun - Tet is the best). The book won him second prize in the De Men (Cricket) Award for children's literature and art. There was no first prize that year, with Nguyễn Nhật Ánh winning first prize in the year before.

== Achievements ==
Dũng is among Vietnamese comic artists who have the highest number of printed copies, with over 200,000 copies accumulated so far. In 2019, Dũng was nominated in Forbes 30 Under 30 list in Vietnam and was recognized as a potential seed. In June 2021, his comic book Ly & Chũn - Tết là nhất, nhất là Tết won him the Cricket Desire award. This is the second prize of Dế Mèn (Cricket) Award, an annual award to honor art and literature works dedicated to children. This award marked Dũng's career maturity, from a "comic book prodigy" into a seasoned comic book writer.

== Written works ==
=== Series ===
- "Mèo Mốc" (Meo Moc, 6+ volumes, 2014 until now)
  - "Nhật ký Mèo Mốc" (Diary of Meo Moc, 2014)
  - "Mèo Mốc - Chuyện đèn đỏ & cái lỗ đen vũ trụ" (Meo Moc, Story of the red traffic light & the black hole, 2015)
  - "Mèo Mốc - Hành trình tới Singapore" (Meo Moc, Journey to Singapore, 2016)
  - "Mèo Mốc - Hãy ngắm nhìn bầu trời!" (Meo Moc, Let's look at the sky!, 2017)
  - "Mèo Mốc - Ơ, sinh nhật rồi này?" (Meo Moc, Hey it's already my birthday?, 2018)
  - "Mèo Mốc - Và Xuân sẽ lại về" (Meo Moc, And the Spring will come back, 2020)
  - "Mèo Mốc & Thế Giới Diệu Kỳ Màu Xám (Meo Moc and the Grey Wonderland,2022)
- "Mèo Mốc Black Book" (Meo Moc Black Book, 4+ volumes, 2021 until now)
- "Tây Du Hí" (Humorous Journey to the West, 6+ volumes, 2015 until now)

=== Short stories ===
- "Nào ta cùng ăn!" (Let's eat!, 2019)
- "Ly & Chũn - Tết là nhất, nhất là Tết" (Ly & Chun - Tet is the best, 2021)
- "Ba Câu Trả Lời" (The Three Answers, 2022)

=== Online Comic ===
- "Mèo Mốc" (Meo Moc)
- "Con Oe"
- "The Landscape"
- "Những âm thanh từ thế giới khác" (Sounds from another world)
- "Cái bóng" (The Shadow)
- "First Contact"
- "Lửa" (Flare, under the pen name Nyomm)
- "Vị quê" (Flavor of hometown)
- "Đặc vụ chìm ở quanh ta" (There are secret agents around us)

== Social activism ==
=== Fight against the 2018 fake news incident ===
In 2018, a Vietnamese textbook's teaching method was under scrutiny because of viral falsified information. The misunderstanding deepened with the false concern of a new "Vietnamese alphabet" where squares and triangles would replace all Latin letters. Accompanied by memes and tabloids, the incident escalated so badly that it was all people talked about for months, even to the extent that many verbally attacked the professor behind this teaching method, accusing him for destroying elementary school children's ability to learn Vietnamese

Dũng took the time to research and consolidate all the facts into a bite-size comic named "Khoa học cùng Mèo Mốc - Bảng chữ mới?" (Science with Meo Moc - A new alphabet?). The comic was even used by mainstream media as reference to counterattack the fake news, which effectively put down the fake news days later.

=== Comics during COVID-19 time ===
To help spread necessary knowledge amid the COVID-19 epidemic in Vietnam, Dũng wrote a lot of comic strips telling people the correct way to wear a face mask, health and hygiene precautions that can prevent COVID-19 infection, and what common vaccination side effects people may get

=== Controversies and censorship ===
In November 2016, the third volume of Mèo Mốc, Mèo Mốc - Hành trình tới Singapore was flagged by The Department of Publishing, Printing and Issuing for containing inappropriate contents: Specifically, the book was accused for promoting endangered animal hunting, and for being vulgar when the character Mèo Mốc was seen saying "poop" in a comic page.

The fact that this incident happened months after the initial publishing date of the book also created confusion among readers and comic creators and raised concern of how local comic books are more vulnerable to censorship compared to manga. One month after being recalled, Mèo Mốc - Hành trình tới Singapore was reissued with the controversial contents being removed and replaced. Apart from content changes, the reissued edition also has a different cover art, making this the only volume in the Mèo Mốc series to have two different covers.
