= Dreamy Eyes (film) =

2019 film

- Film poster
- Directed by: Victor Vu
- Written by: Victor Vu; Trieu Hoang My; Kay Nguyễn
- Produced by: Nguyễn Quốc Công; Kay Nguyễn
- Starring: Trúc Anh; Tran Nghia; Tran Phong; Khanh Van
- Cinematography: Dominic Pereira
- Edited by: Vũ Hoàng Anh; Phillee Huỳnh; Nghĩa Bùi; Hoàng Mi Nhon
- Music by: Christopher Wong; Phan Manh Quynh; Desislava Cholakova
- Production companies: Galaxy Media & Entertainment; November Films
- Release date: 18 December 2019
- Running time: 117 minutes
- Country: Vietnam
- Language: Vietnamese

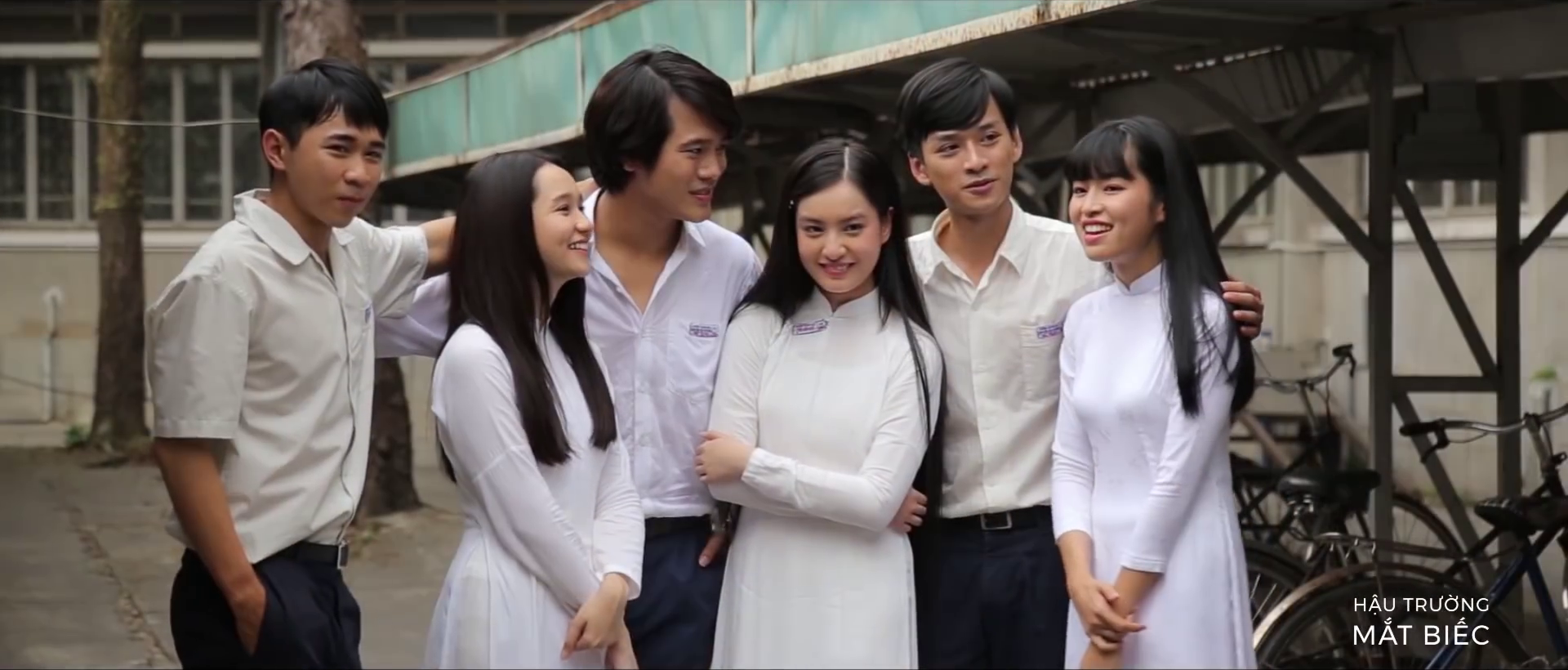
Behind the scenes photo.

Dreamy Eyes (Vietnamese: Mắt biếc) is a 2019 Vietnamese drama film directed by Victor Vu. It was selected as the Vietnamese entry for the Best International Feature Film at the 93rd Academy Awards, but it was not nominated.

== Synopsis ==
Ngan and Ha Lan live in the village of Do Do in the countryside of Vietnam. They meet as children in school and Ngan falls instantly in love with her; he fights off bullies and she tends to his injury with some balm. He tells his grandmother that he will marry her one-day, and she tells him he has good taste because Ha Lan has Dreamy Eyes; Ngan carves this moniker into a tree. Their special friendship develops into their teenage years, with Ha Lan appreciating Ngan's music composition and guitar skills. During one of their walks, Ngan sings one of his songs for Ha Lan. She then tells him that she is going to the city early for university.

A year later Ngan joins her in the city, but notices that she has changed. During one of their excursions, Ha Lan meets Ngan's cousin and housemate Dung, who is very outgoing and flirtatious. Dung and Ha Lan start to see each other more to the dismay of Ngan; he often stalks them on their outings. When Ngan notices that Dung is courting Bich Hoang, he confronts Dung and they subsequently fight. Dung tells Ngan to ask her out if he is so keen on defending her honor. He resolves to tell her his tender feelings, but is unable to find her at her home. He overhears a conversation between Dung and Dung's father about how Dung cannot marry Ha Lan because it will besmirch the family name. He stalks her aunt to a ramshackle house, where he finds Ha Lan hiding away. He tells her that he knows that Dung rebuffed her and is going to marry Bich Hoang and that he will still be her friend, even if she is pregnant with Dung's child. She gives birth to Tra Long and works as a tailor to make ends meet.

After Ngan graduates, he tells Ha Lan that he is returning to Do Do to be a teacher; he also learns that an infant Tra Long has returned to Do Do with Ha Lan's mother. Ngan acts as Tra Long's surrogate father, taking her to the city to see Ha Lan every so often. Ha Lan is often cold towards Tra Long during their meetings. When Tra Long is an adolescent, she and Ngan go to visit Ha Lan who is coming back from a date; Tra Long begs for her mother's attention, scaring away the date. That night, Ngan beseeches Ha Lan to return to Do Do so that they can be a family. She says that she is unable to forgive herself for Tra Long; she sees her mistakes when she looks Tra Long and sees what they lost when she looks at Ngan. They both cry tears of grief.

When Tra Long is packing to go to university, she finds Ngan's music book in a keepsake box. During her time in the city, she often writes back to him. A fellow teacher confesses to Ngan, but he tells her that he can not love her back. When Tra Long returns to Do Do in an ao dai, Ngan is smitten by how much she has grown up. They go for a walk in the woods, at which point she asks him to sing the song he composed for her mother; he says that he does not remember it. She sings it for him, and then tries to kiss him, but he pulls away. That night, he writes a letter for Tra Long saying that he must leave Do Do forever. Ha Lan returns Do Do to console a distraught Tra Long. Tra Long tells her mother that Ngan only ever loved her and that she should not miss out on two things in life: the last train home and true love. Ngan makes his way onto the train; Ha Lan arrives at the station as the train pulls away, chasing it until it is beyond her reach. Both Ha Lan and Ngan cry as they drift apart.

== Cast ==
- Trúc Anh as Ha Lan
- Tran Nghia as Ngan
- Tran Phong as Dung
- Khanh Van as Tra Long

== Original soundtrack ==
The movie has four songs composed by Phan Manh Quynh, including Có chàng trai viết lên cây, Từ đó, Tôi chỉ muốn nói and Hà Lan. Có chàng trai viết lên cây was originally composed in 2016, but the lyrics have been adopted to the movie.

In addition, the film has six songs from the 1960s and 1970s. Composer Christopher Wong directly composed ten of the film's 20 soundtracks. He and director Victor Vu invited the Bulgarian National Radio Symphony Orchestra to record this soundtrack.

== See also ==
- List of submissions to the 93rd Academy Awards for Best International Feature Film
- List of Vietnamese submissions for the Academy Award for Best International Feature Film
