= Scandal (2012 film) =

- Film poster
- Directed by: Victor Vu
- Written by: Victor Vu; Hong Phuc; Cao Tan Loc
- Produced by: Pham Viet Anh Khoa; Tran Thi Bich Ngoc
- Starring: Van Trang; Maya; Minh Thuan; Khuong Ngoc; Duong Hoang Anh; Lan Phuong
- Narrated by: Van Trang
- Cinematography: Nguyen K'Linh
- Edited by: Victor Vu; Thang Vu
- Music by: Christopher Wong
- Production companies: PS Vietnam; Kantana Post; Vietcom
- Distributed by: Galaxy Studio; Saiga Films
- Release date: 12 October 2012
- Running time: 90 minutes
- Country: Vietnam
- Language: Vietnamese
- Budget: 500,000 USD
- Box office: 1,500,000 USD (Vietnam)

Scandal, also known as Bí Mật Thảm Đỏ, is a 2012 Vietnamese horror film directed by Victor Vu, produced by Galaxy Studio and Saiga Films, in association with PS Vietnam, Kantana Post and Vietcom. Scandal was released in Vietnam on October 12, 2012, immediately becoming a critical and box office success.

== Plot ==
Two actresses compete with each other for roles, allowing ambition and personal jealousy to influence their judgment, resulting in terrifying consequences.

== Cast ==
- Van Trang as Y Linh
- Maya as Tra My
- Minh Thuan as Thien
- Khuong Ngoc as Le Hung
- Lan Phuong as Huong
- Duong Hoang Anh as Hoang Kiet
- Duc Thinh as Dai
- Quyen Loc as Vinh
- Jayvee Mai The Hiep as Tra My's manager
- Duong Khac Linh as Musician Duong Khac Linh
- Hong Sap as Witch doctor
- Quach Huu Loc as Journalist
- Huu Tien as Theatre director
