= Blood Letter =

- Vietnamese film poster
- Vietnamese: Thiên Mệnh Anh Hùng
- Directed by: Victor Vu
- Screenplay by: Hong Phuc; Doan Nhat Nam; Victor Vu
- Based on: Bức Huyết Thư by Bùi Anh Tấn
- Produced by: Le Lam Vien; Pham Viet Anh Khoa
- Starring: Huynh Dong; Midu; Van Trang; Khuong Ngoc; Van Anh
- Cinematography: K'Linh Nguyen
- Edited by: Bao Vi Nguyen; Victor Vu
- Music by: Christopher Wong
- Production companies: Saiga Films; Phương Nam Films; BHD
- Distributed by: Megastar Media
- Release date: 20 January 2012
- Running time: 100 minutes
- Country: Vietnam
- Language: Vietnamese

Thiên mệnh anh hùng (天命英雄), known as Blood Letter and Sword of the Assassin in English, is a 2012 Vietnamese martial arts action fantasy film directed by Victor Vu, and produced by Phuong Nam Films and Saiga Films, in association with BHD. One of the most expensive Vietnamese films ever made, Blood Letter is considered the first film of its kind (Kiem Hiep or "sword fighter adventures") in Vietnam. It was released theatrically in Vietnam on 20 January 2012 by Megastar Media. The film was going to be the official submission for Vietnam to the 86th Academy Awards for Best Foreign Language Film. However, on 19 September 2013, the National Cinema Department announced that the film did not meet the AMPAS criteria for distribution.

== Synopsis ==
Adapted from the popular novel Bức Huyết Thư by Bùi Anh Tấn, based on the life of Nguyễn Anh Vũ, a Royal court officer during the era of Emperor Lê Thánh Tông. The film begins with a young boy arriving at the shore of a remote monastery. The boy grows up under the care and martial arts tutelage of the lone monk who cares for the temple. Twelve years later, Nguyen Vu discovers his true identity, that he is the lone descendant of the nobleman Nguyễn Trãi, who was beheaded, along with the rest of his family, when he was implicated in the death of the King. Two eunuchs from the Royal Court learn the truth and when they try to escape are hunted down. One of the eunuchs writes his testimony in blood before he dies and this Blood Letter disappears. Nguyen Vu then embarks on a quest to find this letter so that he may clear his grandfather's name. Along the way he meets two sisters who are also on a quest to carry out vengeance against the Royal Court.

== Cast ==
- Huynh Dong as Nguyen Vu
- Midu as Hoa Xuan
- Van Trang as Empress Dowager Tuyên Từ
- Khuong Ngoc as Tran Tuong Quan
- Van Anh as Lê Nghi Dân, Prince of Lạng Sơn
- Minh Thuan as Su Phu
- Jaivee Mai The Hiep as Le Dai Nhan
