= Kiss of the Death =

- Nụ Hôn Thần Chết
- Directed by: Nguyễn Quang Dũng
- Written by: Nguyễn Quang Dũng
- Cinematography: Nguyễn Trinh Hoan
- Release date: January 25, 2008 (Vietnam)
- Country: Vietnam
- Language: Vietnamese

Kiss of the Death (Vietnamese: Nụ Hôn Thần Chết) is a comedy released in 2008 that stars Thanh Hang and Johnny Tri Nguyen. It was directed by Nguyễn Quang Dũng. It grossed over 16 billion dong, making it the highest-grossing film in Vietnamese history at that time.

== Synopsis ==
Only the kiss of the prince of Death (Johnny) can draw hearts and farewell victims of his fate down to Hell. Ironically, he was still too inexperienced and naive. He was mistaken as an underaged person. His mom managed to buy him time for 3 days to find a victim and complete the kiss.

Meanwhile, An (Thanh Hang) was told by a fortuneteller that she would die in 3 days. Not believing this, she walked out. But one night while walking home drunk, she was almost attacked by street robbers when Death saved her. As a result, he was beaten up by the girl (Thanh Hang) he was assigned to kiss, for stalking. After that, Death gave her the option of death but she did not want to die. Over many mischievously cute situations between them that involved tears and smiles, she suddenly realised... Death turned out to be really cute and he could not withdraw her soul with his bitter kiss.

But if he does not fulfill his mission to suck the soul of the person he was assigned to in "The Book of Life and Death", Death would have to bear the curse of his father. Would their love and sincerity overcome the barriers of the two realms of Life and Death?

== Main cast ==
- Johnny Trí Nguyễn as Death
- Thanh Hang An alcoholic
- Thành Lộc as Church Priest
- Hoài Linh as Death's Father (Death King)

== See also ==
- Giải cứu thần chết
