= Ticket to Childhood =

- Author: Nguyễn Nhật Ánh
- Translator: William Naythons
- Language: Vietnamese
- Genre: Novel
- Publisher: Tre Publishing House
- Publication date: 2008
- Publication place: Vietnam
- Media type: Print
- ISBN: 978-604-1-00475-7

Ticket to Childhood (Vietnamese: Cho tôi xin một vé đi tuổi thơ, literally "Please Give me a ticket to Childhood") is a 2008 novella by Nguyễn Nhật Ánh. With this novella, Nguyễn Nhật Ánh was awarded S.E.A. Write Award in 2010.

The English translation by William Naythons was published by The Overlook Press in 2014.
