= Tre Publishing House =

Vietnamese publishing company

Nhà xuất bản Trẻ
- Company type: Publisher
- Industry: Publishing
- Founded: 1986
- Headquarters: 161B Lý Chính Thắng; Ward 7; District 3; Ho Chi Minh City
- Website: www.nxbtre.com.vn/en/

Tre Publishing House (Vietnamese: Nhà Xuất Bản Trẻ) is a book and magazine publisher in Vietnam.

== Publications ==
A large part of books published by Tre Publishing House are those about generic life topics; however, it is their fiction books that the company is most well known for.

Tre Publishing House has published work by contemporary Vietnamese authors such as Nguyễn Nhật Ánh and Nguyễn Ngọc Tư. The company has published work by foreign authors to Vietnam including Mario Puzo (The Godfather), Paul Auster, Thomas Mann, J. K. Rowling (Harry Potter), etc.

- Vừa nhắm mắt vừa mở cửa sổ (2004)
- Cánh đồng bất tận (2005)
- Tôi là Bêtô (2007)
- Cho tôi xin một vé đi tuổi thơ (2008)
- Nữ thần báo tử (dịch phẩm, 2012)
- Nhóc Miko! (Manga, 2011)
- Skip Beat! (Manga, 2013)

Since the end of 2012, Tre Publishing House has distributed e-book versions of published publications through one of its member unit - YBOOK, (full name is Young E-Books Co., Ltd).

== See also ==
- Kim Đồng Publishing House
- TVM Comics
