= Midu (actress) =

Vietnamese actress

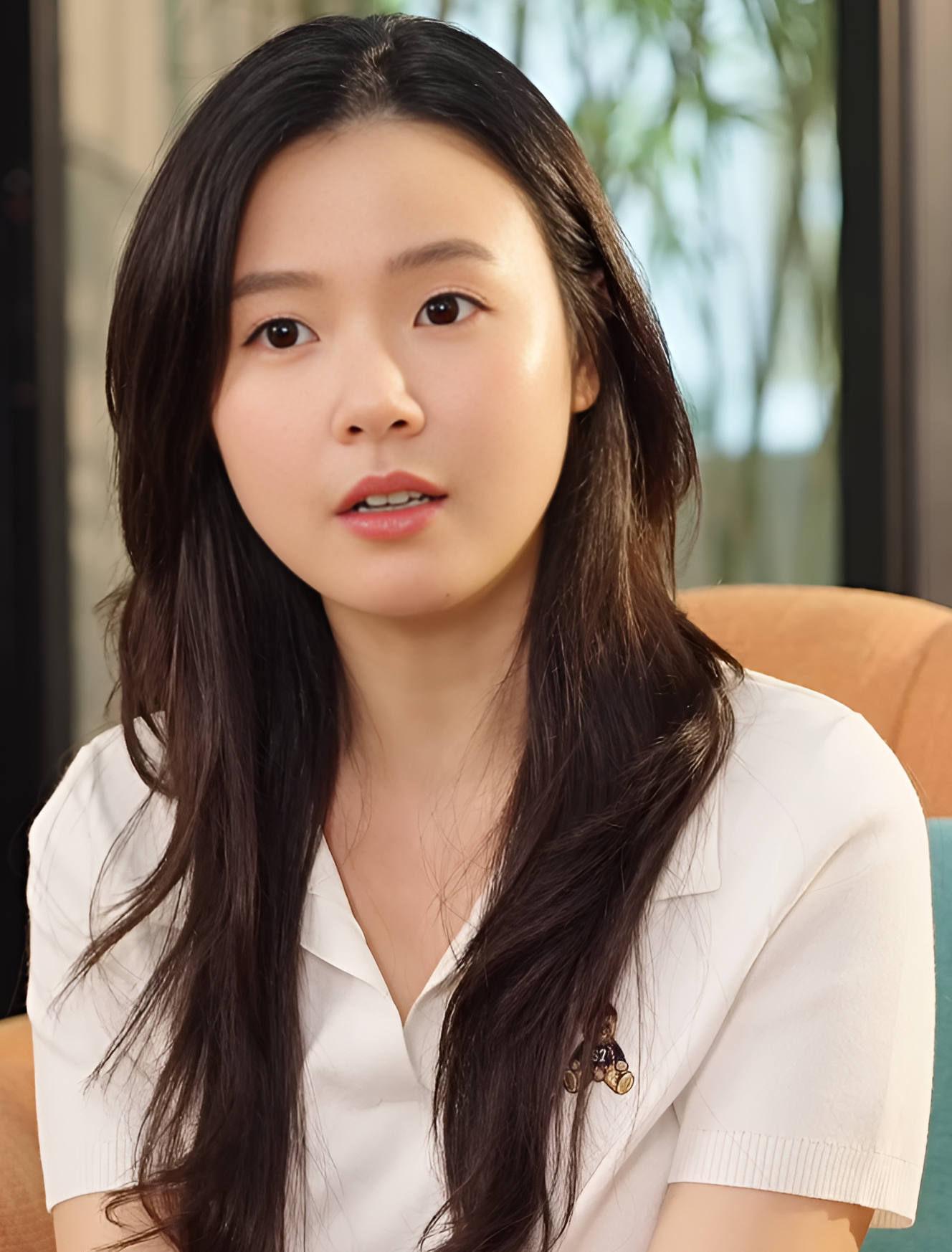
- Midu in 2025
- Born: Đặng Thị Mỹ Dung; 5 October 1989 (age 37); Ho Chi Minh City, Vietnam
- Education: Ho Chi Minh City University of Architecture – Fashion Design
- Occupations: Actress; model; businesswoman; lecturer
- Years active: 2007–present
- Height: 1.60 m (5 ft 3 in)

Đặng Thị Mỹ Dung (born 5 October 1989), also known as Midu, is a Vietnamese actress, model, lecturer and businesswoman. She has been a lecturer in fashion design at Ho Chi Minh City University of Technology (HUTECH) since May 2017.

Midu starred in the martial arts action movie, Blood Letter (directed by Victor Vu), in 2012. In 2016, Midu starred in the comedy romance film, Four Years, Two Men, One Love, with Harry Lu. Midu's latest appearance is in the fantasy romance film, Nhân Duyên: Người Yêu Tiền Kiếp(2019) as one of the stars, with Trịnh Thăng Bình. Midu has appeared on various Vietnamese gameshows, such as Nhanh như chớp, Chọn Ai Đây, and Ca Sĩ Bí Ẩn.

Midu released her first single, "Anh Nghĩ Anh Là Ai?" on 30 December 2019.

== Early life ==
Midu was born in Ho Chi Minh City, Vietnam on 5 October 1989. She went to THCS Lê Văn Tám junior high and THPT Gia Định high school in Bình Thạnh district in Ho Chi Minh City.

Midu won the Hot VTeen award when she was 18 years old in 2007. This was the beginning of her career in the arts.

== Film career ==
=== Film ===
Year	Title	Role	Notes
2012	Thiên mệnh anh hùng	Hoa Xuân	
2012	Mùa hè lạnh	Nhâm	
2013	Hit: Hoàng tử và Lọ lem	Bảo Hân	
2016	4 năm, 2 chàng, 1 tình yêu	Quỳnh	
2016	Bí ẩn song sinh		
2017	Mẹ chồng	Tuyết Mai	
2018	Tôi là Lụa	Lụa	Short film
2019	Nhân duyên: Người yêu tiền kiếp	Mai	

=== Television ===
Year	Title	Role	Notes
2009	Những thiên thần áo trắng	Ngọc	
2010	Tóc rối	Bông Sen	
2013	Con trai con gái	Bình	
2014	14 ngày đấu trí	Teacher	Guest
2018	Nhanh như chớp	Contestant	Season 1 Episode 36
2019	Ca Sĩ Bí Ẩn	Guest	Season 3 Episode 11
2019	Người bí ẩn	Guest	Season 6 Episode 9
2019	Nhanh như chớp	Contestant	Season 2 Episode 24
2019	Giọng Ải Giọng Ai	Guest	Season 4 Episode 10
2019	Kiddie Shark	Shark	Season 1
2019	Nhanh như chớp	Contestant	Season 2 Episode 29
2020	Chọn Ai Đây	Contestant	Season 1 Episode 1
2020	Ca Sĩ Bí Ẩn	Contestant	Season 4 Episode 3

=== Awards ===
Year	Award	Category	Result	Ref.
2016	Korean Culture Entertainment Awards	Award for Best Asia Actress	Won	
2017	Golden Kite Prize	Best Actress in Supporting Role	Won	

== Personal life ==
Midu opened her own boutique in Võ Văn Tần street, District 3, Ho Chi Minh City in 2009.

In May 2013, Midu graduated with a degree in fashion design from Ho Chi Minh City University of Architecture.

Midu started dating Vietnamese businessman Phan Thành in 2012 and made their relationship public in 2013. After nearly two years of dating, Phan and Midu became engaged. They broke up three months before the wedding after it came out that Phan cheated.

In November 2017, Midu opened 'Zone 87', a dining and shopping complex in Nguyễn Huệ street, District 1, Ho Chi Minh City.

=== Family ===
Her father is a police officer and her mother is a housewife. She has one younger brother, Đặng Trung Hiếu, who was born in 1995. Midu is especially close to her dad, who is very supportive of her.
