= Detective Kien: The Headless Horror =

- Film poster
- Directed by: Victor Vu
- Screenplay by: Duc Nguyen
- Based on: The Lake of Vengeance by Hong Thai
- Produced by: Victor Vu; Dinh Ngoc Diep
- Starring: Quoc Huy; Dinh Ngoc Diep; Tran Quoc Anh; Doan Minh Anh; Pham Quynh Anh
- Cinematography: Dominic Pereira
- Edited by: Vu Hoang Anh
- Music by: Christopher Wong
- Production companies: November Films; Galaxy Studio
- Distributed by: Mockingbird Pictures
- Release date: 30 April 2025 (Vietnam)
- Running time: 131 minutes
- Country: Vietnam
- Box office: $9.77 million

Detective Kien: The Headless Horror (Vietnamese: Thám Tử Kiên: Kỳ Án Không Đầu) is a 2025 period horror-thriller film directed by Victor Vu. It is a spinoff of Vu's previous film, The Last Wife (2023), which featured the character of Detective Kien in a minor role; both films are adaptations of Hong Thai's novel The Lake of Vengeance.

The film was released in Vietnam on 30 April 2025.

== Plot ==
During the Nguyễn dynasty in 19th-century Vietnam, in a remote Vietnamese village, a headless corpse is discovered. From that moment on, more decapitated bodies begin appearing in the lake near the village—eight in total. The villagers believe these victims were slain by a supernatural guardian they called the "water wraith." Five years later, a woman named Moon is distraught when her niece, Nga, vanishes without a trace. While the villagers insist that Nga is taken by the water wraith, Moon refuses to believe it. Determined to uncover the truth, she seeks help from Detective Kien, whom years earlier arrested her corrupt husband.

Kien arrives and begins investigating Nga’s disappearance. His first stop is Nga’s home, where he learns that a thief breke into her room the night she went missing, shattering a ceramic plate. At the lake, Kien meets a villager who found Nga’s shoe. Inside it, he discovers seeds from the xanthium plant. Later, when visiting the village shaman, Kien is told that xanthium grow near the waterfall close to the village.

Kien goes to the waterfall with Moon and finds traces of blood. Moon then shares her past: Nga’s biological mother—Moon’s sister—had abandoned her when she was just a baby. Moon loved Nga deeply, so much so that Nga grew up seeing Moon as her true mother. However, Nga’s father, Vinh, disliked their closeness and forced Moon to leave. Without saying goodbye, Moon disappeared, leaving Nga to wait for her return for many years. When Nga eventually grew up, Moon came back. Although Nga was hurt by the abandonment, she chose to forgive Moon and welcomed her back into her life.

Back in the village, Kien sees a vision of Nga taken by the water wraith, her head severed. Kien then visits the district chief’s house to question his daughter, Tuyet, who was the last person to interact with Nga before she disappeared. There, Kien also finds a connection between the broken ceramic plate and Thac, Tuyet’s fiancé.

Kien visits Thac’s house and learns that Thac and Nga fell in love and have a relationship, but Thac cannot marry her because he is already engaged to Tuyet. During a family meeting between Thac and Tuyet’s families, Thac proposes to make Nga his second wife, but Tuyet’s family reject the idea immediately. Later, when Kien returns to Tuyet and Thac’s house, he finds that Tuyet’s family accused Nga of being pregnant, an accusation Thac denies.

Kien then has an idea to catch the thief who stole Nga’s ceramic plate. Moon holds a knife‑throwing contest to lure him out. After identifying him as a man named Dong, Kien and Moon go to his house and arrest him. When interrogated, Dong accuses Vinh of having an affair with the District Chief’s wife, Vuong. Kien immediately interrogates Vinh, and Vinh admits that he made a deal with Vuong to separate Thac and Nga in exchange for money to pay off his debts. After this investigation, Kien arrests Tuyet, suspected of harming Nga. Tuyet admits that she accidentally hit Nga’s head near the waterfall. After the arrest, Kien keeps seeing visions of the water wraith. Meanwhile, Vuong orders her servant Mui to ensure that Dong kills Nga. In a flashback, it is revealed that a week earlier, when Tuyet hit Nga’s head at the waterfall, Mui followed her and found Nga unconscious. Mui informed Dong, who then took Nga’s body and imprisoned her in his secret cave, using her to blackmail Vuong. Not long after, a woman’s corpse believed to be Nga was found near the lake. Unable to bear his guilt, Vinh hanged himself, while Kien decided to exhume all eight victims of the water wraith buried in the village. After performing autopsies, Kien confirms with certainty that the woman’s body found was not killed by the water wraith—and was not Nga.

Vuong, who wants Nga killed quickly, takes Mui to Dong’s house and asks him to kill Nga in exchange for money. Dong immediately kills Mui, believing she betrayed him, and drags Vuong to his place. Feeling threatened, Vuong says that she hid the payment money for Dong somewhere. She asks Dong to kill Nga in return for that as reward. As Dong moves to take the money, Nga sees an opportunity and escapes into the forest. Dong chases her, but Kien blocks his way. A fight breaks out between them, and Kiens win, killing Dong. Meanwhile, Nga runs with Moon, managing to knock Vuong unconscious, and tie her up.

Nga, Moon, and Kien return to the village, where Thac greets them and embrace Nga. As Detective Kien prepares to leave and say farewell, he realizes the mystery of the water wraith that haunted the village for years. Kien reveals a plant used by the village shaman causes frequent nosebleeds and hallucinations among the villagers, making them see apparitions of the water wraith. When Kien leads his men to arrest the shaman, he discovers the severed head of the District Chief in the shaman’s house. Guided by a feather from the shaman’s winter cloak, Kien and his men pursue him north.

== Cast ==
- Quoc Huy as Detective Kien
- Dinh Ngoc Diep as Miss Moon
- Tran Quoc Anh as Thac, a ceramic maker, Tuyet's fiancé
- Doan Minh Anh as Nga, Miss Mon's nephew, Vinh's son
- Pham Quynh Anh as Tuyet, Thac's fiancee
- My Uyen as Mrs. Vuong, Tuyet's mother, wife of the District Chief
- Sy Toàn as Dong, a thief who used to work for the District Chief
- Xuân Trang as District Chief
- Quốc Cường as village shaman
- Tín Nguyễn as Mui, a maid who works for the District Chief's family

== Production ==
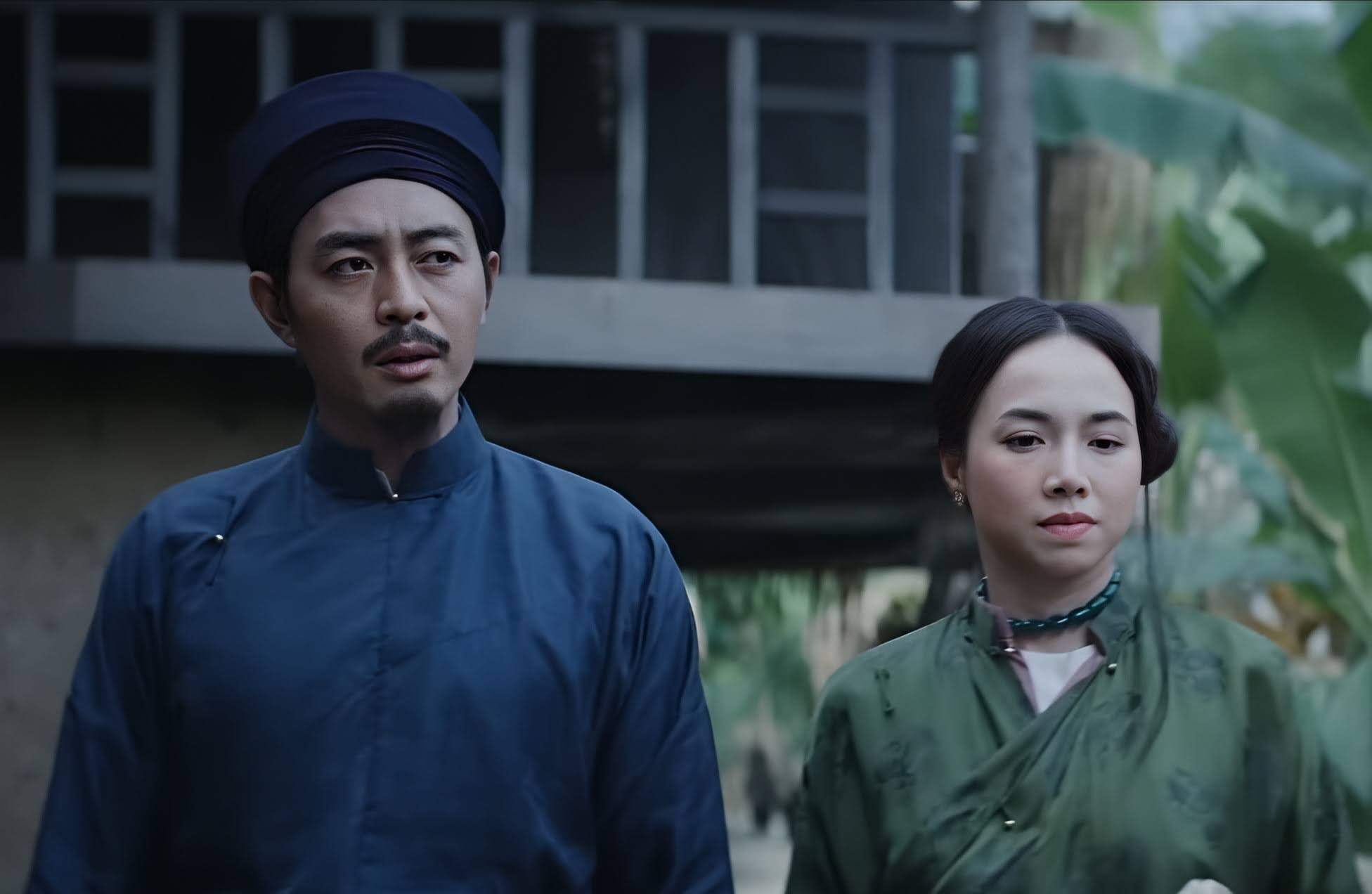
Quoc Huy and Dinh Ngoc Diep as Detective Kien and Miss Moon, respectively

Detective Kien was filmed in Vietnam's mountainous Northern Uplands region. Filming took place in Khuổi Ky, an ancient village with buildings made of stone; Khuổi Nhi Waterfall, in Na Hang district; and Vinh Quý Grass Hill. Due to the remoteness of the area, the crew had to dig their own roads and build bridges so vehicles carrying filming equipment could reach the locations, while some places could only be reached by boat. One small island where the fishing village scenes were filmed had no electricity, so cables were floated along the surface of the water to provide power.

There were 150 crew members on the shoot, along with 50-70 part-time crew and extras. The production attempted to depict historical Vietnamese society as faithfully as possible, recreating the appearance of a 200-year-old village. The crew designed close to 1,000 costumes appropriate for the Nguyễn dynasty era, with actors wearing three to five layers of clothing depending on their social hierarchy.

== Release ==
Detective Kien was released in Vietnam on 30 April 2025, timed to coincide with Reunification Day, the public holiday commemorating the end of the Vietnam War. It was released in theaters in the United States, Germany, Czech Republic and Slovakia on 29 May 2025, and in the UK, Canada, Norway, Sweden and Poland on 30 May 2025.

== Reception ==
=== Box office ===
In the first week after its release, Detective Kien earned ₫143 billion (US$5.44 million) through 538,747 tickets sold in Vietnam. It ultimately made US$9.53 million in Vietnam and US$9.77 million worldwide, becoming the second-highest-grossing film of 2025 in Vietnam, and the eighth-highest-grossing film of all time in Vietnam.

=== Critical response ===
Peter Martin of ScreenAnarchy gave the film a positive review, writing, "Detective Kien: The Headless Horror is an absorbing mystery that sometimes gets bloody and even occasionally gut-wrenching, yet avoids shock kills and clever cuts that are the stock in trade for modern Hollywood horror movies. The horror here comes from the evil that men — and sometimes women — are capable of inflicting upon other."
