= Yellow Flowers on the Green Grass =

2015 Vietnamese film by Victor Vu

- Film poster
- Directed by: Victor Vũ
- Screenplay by: Việt Linh; Victor Vũ; Đoàn Nhật Nam
- Based on: Yellow Flowers on the Green Grass by Nguyễn Nhật Ánh
- Produced by: Trịnh Thị Thanh Tâm; Nguyễn Cao Tùng
- Starring: Thịnh Vinh; Trọng Khang; Thanh Mỹ
- Cinematography: Nguyễn K'Linh
- Edited by: Thang Vu
- Music by: Christopher Wong; Garrett Crosby
- Production companies: Galaxy Media & Entertainment; Saigon Concert; Phương Nam Film
- Distributed by: Galaxy Media & Entertainment
- Release date: 2 October 2015
- Running time: 103 minutes
- Country: Vietnam
- Language: Vietnamese
- Budget: 20 billion dong
- Box office: 3.5 million USD (77.77 billion dong)

Yellow Flowers on the Green Grass (Vietnamese: Tôi thấy hoa vàng trên cỏ xanh) is a 2015 Vietnamese film. It was adapted from the novel of the same name by Nguyễn Nhật Ánh. The film was directed by Victor Vũ and produced by Galaxy Media & Entertainment Saigon Concert, Phương Nam Film, PS Việt Nam and K+ Television channel. It premiered at the Cannes Film Festival 2015 and was released in theaters on 2 October 2015. It was selected as the Vietnamese entry for the Best Foreign Language Film at the 89th Academy Awards, but it was not nominated. On December 5 during the 19th Vietnam Film Festival, the movie was awarded the Golden Lotus (the most-honored award given to a Vietnamese movie).

== Plot ==
This is a movie portraying love and affection for a hometown, a family and teenage hood of each. Tường is an innocent and lovely boy while his brother Thiều is selfish and stubborn. Aside from brotherhood filled with love, hate, envy, regret and atonement,...this is also about friendship, childhood memories of children living in poverty in Middle Region of Vietnam during 80s. There are fights; interesting kids' games; dreams filled with the images of prince and princess, and their first crush...

The story is demonstrated through a diary of Thiều evolving his daily life and thoughts. Thiều is a seventh grader who lives in a poor countryside with his younger brother named Tường. Tường is a lovely, generous and nice boy who loves his brother a lot; he especially loves playing with animals including bugs. He is an introvert and loves reading many books and folk tales, especially the story of Cóc Tía (Purple Toad), therefore he pets a toad under his bed and names it "Cu Cậu". On the other hand, Thiều is a mischievous, extroverted boy who has been unintentionally letting Tường take all the blame for his tricks. Although being selfish on the outside, deep down Thiều still loves his brother. The brothers often hang around playing many traditional games for kids and make many memories out of it. The story also broadens the relationship between the brothers and people in their village, including their classmates and families. Their father is described as a gentleman who is appreciated by many, yet he has a short temper and often beat the two brothers for some reasons, while their mother is a nice woman, but she scolds them for their mistakes regardless.

Uncle Đàn is the younger brother of Thiều's father who is handicapped yet still positive and often spares his time to tell some spooky stories for two brothers. His only sorrow must be his ill-fated love caused by losing one of his arms. Uncle Đàn loves Vinh, a girl who is the daughter of Thiều's scary teacher and also lives in the same village. One of Thiều's classmates is Sơn, who is 3 years older but still in the same class with Thiều due to his bad grades. Sơn is a muscular boy who is extremely naughty with much misbehavior. Later, Thiều comes to realize his crush for his classmate Mận. Mận is cute and innocent, but she doesn't study well enough because she has to take care of her sick father, who is locked inside a shack by her mother. Only Thiều and Tường know this secret as both have to fight against Sơn to protect Mận from evil plans.

The shack Mận's father is locked inside catches fire; her mother is arrested for capturing her husband who is assumed to have died during the fire as bones are discovered in the ash. Mận is shocked and completely devastated; Thiều's family decide to help her by telling her that she can live with them. Mận is aware of the fact that her father is still alive and her mother will be released soon. However, the friendship between Mận and Tường gradually makes Thiều jealous. He doesn't care enough to stop his brother's toad from being taken and killed for its meat. The incident haunts Thiều as he watches Tường mourn over the toad not knowing his big brother is partially responsible. The flood arrives and the village is drowned, once it withdraws, the village is left with poverty and a lack of crop. Thiều, Tường and Mận discover that Uncle Đàn and Vinh have already planned for an escape from their family. At the same time, Thiều's selfishness is getting bigger, which makes him hit Tường with a big stick of wood, leaving Tường paralyzed. Thiều feels even more regretful as Tường tells him that he is the one whom Mận would like to hang out with.

== Cast ==
- Thịnh Vinh as Thiều
- Trọng Khang as Tường
- Thanh Mỹ as Mận
- Mai Thế Hiệp as Mr. Nhãn
- Trương Tú Liên as Thiều's mother
- Lê Vinh as Thiều's father
- Anh Tú as Đàn
- Khánh Hiền as Vinh
- Mai Trần as Tám Tàng
- Mỹ Anh as Nhi

== Production ==
Director Việt Linh was hired by Phuong Nam Films to write the script, which was finished in 2013. Victor Vũ and Đoàn Nhật Nam made additional writing contributions. This is the first movie by Victor Vũ that he did not write by himself. The script was adapted from the novel of the same name by Nguyễn Nhật Ánh.

The film was mostly shot at Phu Yen, Van Ninh Commune, Khanh Hoa Province and Ho Chi Minh City. Its budget was nearly 20 billion VND. This is the first Vietnamese film which was produced as a cooperation between national and private companies.

== See also ==
- List of submissions to the 89th Academy Awards for Best Foreign Language Film
- List of Vietnamese submissions for the Academy Award for Best Foreign Language Film
