= The Scent of Burning Grass =

2012 film

- Directed by: Nguyen Huu Muoi
- Written by: Nhuan Cam Hoang
- Starring: To Tuan Dang
- Cinematography: Pham Thanh Ha
- Release date: 24 April 2012
- Running time: 97 minutes
- Country: Vietnam
- Language: Vietnamese

The Scent of Burning Grass (Vietnamese: Mùi cỏ cháy) is a 2012 Vietnamese drama film directed by Nguyen Huu Muoi. The film was selected as the Vietnamese entry for the Best Foreign Language Oscar at the 85th Academy Awards, but it did not make the final shortlist.

== Plot ==
The film is divided into two parts: the first covers the period when four university students enlist and become recruits, while the second depicts the battle at the Quang Tri Citadel. It opens with the four students—Hoang, Thanh, Thang, and Long—receiving their enlistment orders; before departing, they meet at Thong Nhat Park to take a commemorative photo. Amidst playful laughter, they pose for a picture near the statue of a girl reading a book. The photographer (played by People's Artist Nguyen Hai) refuses payment, promising instead to take another photo when they return victorious. Next, the four return to the lecture hall at the University of Hanoi to write farewell messages on the blackboard. Before enlisting, Long witnesses his parents' divorce proceedings in court; upon returning home, he removes the curtain dividing the room, pushes their separate beds back together, and leaves a letter for his parents.

Subsequently, the four friends enlist one by one. On the journey to their base, Hoang plays music while the recruits sing a parody of the song *Footsteps on the Truong Son Range*: "We are our parents' children / If we miss home, we'll just slip away / We need no rucksack, no dry rations, no mess tin / We'll go home for a few minutes, then come right back..." Company Commander Phong, their commanding officer, halts the vehicle and sternly lectures the young soldiers on military conduct and discipline. Back at the barracks, amidst grueling training sessions, there are moments of youthful camaraderie—sneaking out to confide in one another, reading poetry, singing *Chèo* opera, bathing naked, and playing pranks—while their rucksacks still hold trinkets like metal cicada toys and colorful marbles. During a stint stationed in a village, Long falls in love with and confesses his feelings to a village girl washing clothes by the well, using his music to express his heart. On the day the troops deployed, a village girl gave Long an embroidered handkerchief wrapped in a clover-patterned case bearing the inscription "Souvenir 1971," promising to await his return. Soldiers in the convoy hurriedly tossed letters onto the roadside, hoping local women would pick them up and mail them. Nearing the front lines, Hoang was struck by artillery fire and severely wounded, preventing him from joining the initial assault alongside his three friends.

The Battle of the Quang Tri Citadel began with soldiers crossing the Thach Han River to reach the battlefield, suffering heavy casualties from bombs and artillery during the crossing. Of the unit's 107 men, only 49 remained after reaching the other bank; the river was choked with blood and corpses. Upon crossing, the young recruits were immediately confronted by the sight of wounded soldiers strewn across the aid station and body bags being carried out from the citadel. Overwhelmed by the harrowing battlefield scene, Long panicked; shortly thereafter, he was struck by shrapnel and killed in action. His comrades buried him alongside a curtain, a charred guitar, and the handkerchief, now stained crimson with his blood. The freshly mounded grave was almost immediately blown apart by an artillery shell. Inside the citadel, the young Liberation soldiers faced elite Army of the Republic of Vietnam (ARVN) airborne and marine units, supported by aerial bombardment, artillery, and M-113 armored personnel carriers. The fighting grew increasingly fierce, particularly as the Paris Peace Talks were underway. During lulls in the combat, the young soldiers would emerge from their bunkers to joke and play; Thanh even dressed as a woman to perform the *Cheo* opera role of Thi Mau amidst the billowing black smoke. Hoang eventually recovered and made his way to the citadel battlefield, reuniting with Thanh and Thang, though they fought in different units. Thang, serving as a communications soldier, was struck by enemy fire and killed while attempting to repair a severed communication line.

As the battle neared its climax, the Army of the Republic of Vietnam intensified its offensive, aiming to plant its flag atop the ancient citadel. In a desperate bid to stop the opposing soldiers from planting the flag, Thanh and his comrades found themselves out of ammunition, and his fellow soldiers fell one by one. In a moment of mortal peril, Thanh charged forward with his bayonet-fixed AK-47, killing the soldier carrying the yellow-and-red-striped flag, only to be struck in the chest by enemy fire and killed himself. Each time one of the four friends perished, the statue of the young woman in Thong Nhat Park shed tears of blood. The film concludes with the Spring General Offensive of 1975, ending with the image of a Vietnam People's Army tank crashing through the gates of the Independence Palace. Hoang reunited with Company Commander Phong in the palace courtyard; the two embraced and wept as Phong returned the photograph—taken before their enlistment—of the four friends posing beside the statue of the young woman.

== Cast ==
- Nguyễn Năng Tùng (as the 20-year-old Hoàng) and Nguyễn Hữu Mười (as the 60-year-old Hoàng): A soldier who is also a dashing, romantic poet and a Literature student at Hanoi General University; he enlisted on September 6, 1971. This character reflects the youth of screenwriter Hoàng Nhuận Cầm and serves as both the narrator and the embodiment of the film's central theme through his own life story. Hoàng is the only survivor among the four friends following the 81-day-and-night Battle of the Quang Tri Ancient Citadel; he later participated in the 1975 Spring Offensive and reunited with his former commanding officer right in front of the Independence Palace on April 30, 1975. The film opens with Hoàng—now 60 years old—returning to the Quang Tri Ancient Citadel to offer incense to his fallen comrades.
- Lê Văn Thơm as Thành: A cheerful soldier fond of singing chèo (traditional opera); a Literature student at Hanoi General University who enlisted on September 6, 1971. He is haunted by past mistakes that angered his mother—specifically, refusing to submit to her punishment when she was upset—and longs for the day of victory so he can return home and let her punish him severely. He never got the chance to fulfill this wish, however; he was killed in action at the Quang Tri Ancient Citadel while trying to stop Republic of Vietnam soldiers from planting the yellow flag with three red stripes atop the citadel walls.
- Tô Tuấn Dũng as Thăng: A character based on the fallen soldier Nguyễn Văn Thạc—a Literature student at Hanoi General University who enlisted on September 6, 1971. Serving as a communications soldier, he kept a diary containing prophetic entries predicting total victory in April 1975. He was killed in action on the Thạch Hãn River while establishing a connection for the command post.
- Nguyễn Thanh Sơn as Long: A Literature student at Hanoi General University who enlisted on September 6, 1971; he was a soldier who loved singing and playing the guitar. Before enlisting, he witnessed his parents' divorce in court; he subsequently returned home to push their separate beds together and took the curtain that had divided their small room with him to the battlefield. Before marching South, he met a village girl washing clothes by the well—connecting with her through his music—and they exchanged vows for his return, marked by a handkerchief embroidered with the words "Memories of 1971." He was killed in a moment of panic amidst heavy shelling after crossing the Thạch Hãn River; the very grave where he was laid to rest was immediately blown apart by a strike from the US 7th Fleet.
- Lê Chí Kiên as Company Commander Phong: A First Lieutenant and the commander of the unit containing Hoàng, Thành, Thăng, and Long; he trained the recruits and helped lead the unit during the 1972 Battle of the Quang Tri Citadel. He is portrayed as a strict figure toward recruits but a humorous and deeply caring leader to his men. On the day of victory—April 30, 1975—he unexpectedly ran into Hoàng at the Independence Palace and embraced him tightly, weeping upon seeing the photograph of the four soldiers taken before they had enlisted.

== See also ==
- List of submissions to the 85th Academy Awards for Best Foreign Language Film
- List of Vietnamese submissions for the Academy Award for Best Foreign Language Film
