= Vengeful Heart =

- Film poster
- Vietnamese: Quả Tim Máu
- Directed by: Victor Vũ
- Written by: Victor Vũ; Ethan Trần; Đoàn Nhật Nam
- Based on: Vengeful Heart by Thái Hòa
- Produced by: Martin Nguyễn; Trần Thị Bích Ngọc
- Starring: Nhã Phương; Thái Hòa; Quý Bình; Hoàng Bách; Tú Vi; Kim Xuân; Nancy Nguyễn; Văn Tùng
- Cinematography: Nguyễn K'Linh
- Edited by: Victor Vũ; Thắng Vũ; Võ Đình Hoàng
- Music by: Christopher Wong
- Production company: Poseidon Media Group
- Distributed by: Galaxy Studio; Early Risers Media Group
- Release date: 14 February 2014
- Running time: 97 minutes
- Country: Vietnam
- Language: Vietnamese
- Box office: 91 billion đồng (Vietnam)

Vengeful Heart (Vietnamese: Quả Tim Máu) is a 2014 thriller film directed by Vietnamese-American director Victor Vu. The film was released on 14 February 2014. It stars Nha Phuong, Thai Hoa, Quy Binh, Hoang Bach, Tu Vi, Kim Xuan, Nancy Nguyen and Van Tung.

The film was based on a play of the same title written by Thai Hoa, which was a best-selling play at Phu Nhuan Theater.

== Plot ==
Newly wedded couple Son and Linh go on a vacation. After her heart transplant, Linh keeps encountering unexplainable phenomena and dreaming about a strange house located in the countryside of Da Lat. One day, she sleepwalks to the grave of a woman named Phuong, where she meets Phuong's husband Tam.

Tam brings Linh back to his house and calls Son to inform him of his wife's whereabouts. Linh realizes this is the house in her dream. In the house she meets Phuong's mother, Ms. Le, and Cu Hu, a friend of Phuong and Tam. It is revealed that the heart which had been transplanted for Linh is from Phuong. As Son comes to pick Linh up, Ms. Le invites both of them to stay at their house to join her late daughter's 49-day ceremony.

The supernatural incidents intensify during their stay, Linh sleepwalks more, and Son is also terrorized. Linh is unable to leave the house as her heart will stop beating once she does it.

Eventually, unable to endure the hauntings, Son confesses to be responsible for the accident that hurt Phuong. Later, being questioned at the police station, Son claimed that he caused the accident because he was in a hurry to the hospital. As Phuong seemed unhurt, just unconscious, he called the police before dring away. However, the body found by the police was heavily crushed and could only be identified by Tam.

Cu Hu learns that Linh's blood type is O, therefore she shouldn't have been able to get a transplant from Phuong whose blood type is AB. Later, they learn that Hong, Tam's female business partner, is missing. Experiencing a vision, Linh instructs Tam to drive to the abandoned house on Ma Ta Hill. There, they find Phuong still alive and locked inside for months.

Hong was Tam's mistress. As Tam refused to leave Phuong, Hong secretly instructed Phuong to go to the abandoned house to expose their affair. Phuong got there in time to learn the story, and witnessed Tam knocking Hong unconscious with a shovel. As she fled, she got hit by the car driven by Son. After Son drove away, he switched Phuong and Hong's clothes. Locking Phuong in the basement, he put the barely conscious Hong on the road then used Phuong's car to crush Hong until she was unidentifiable. The heart Linh carries is actually from Hong.

Cu Hu calls the police, however, Tam knocks him unconscious and chases Linh into the woods. Tam prepares to kill Linh, but Hong's ghost show up and delays him just in time for the police to arrive. Trying to escape, Tam gets hit by a truck.

As Phuong reconciles with her mother, Linh and Son are reunited. The movie ends with the scene in which Cu Hu is taking Phuong to sightsee on the boat. Phuong also discovers Cu Hu's unrequited love for her.

== Cast ==
- Nhã Phương as Linh
- Thái Hòa as Cu Hù
- Quý Bình as Tâm
- Hoàng Bách as Sơn
- Tú Vi as Phương
- Kim Xuân as Mrs. Lê
- Nancy Nguyễn as Hồng
- Văn Tùng as Mr. Sáu Dũng
- Mã Trung as Mr. Phong
- Vy Minh as Nurse

== Reception ==
The film grossed 91 billion đồng (US$4.3m) in Vietnam. It was the highest-grossing Vietnamese film of 2014.
