= Nguyễn Nhật Ánh =

Vietnamese author (born 1955)

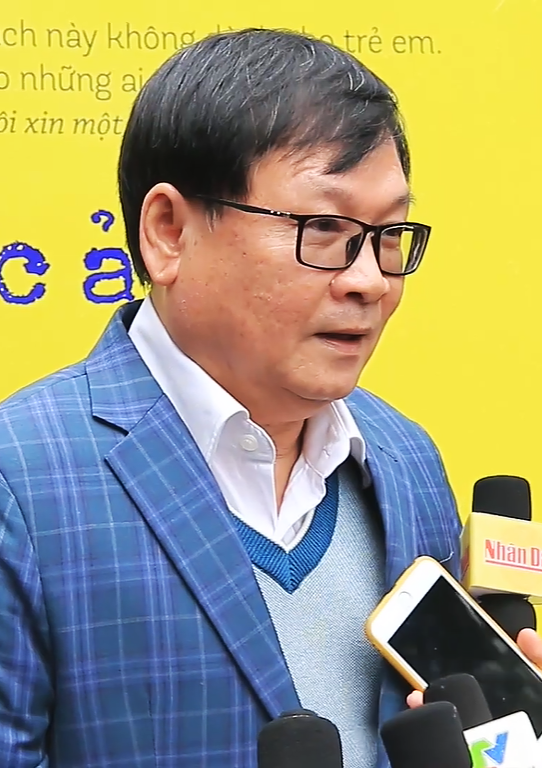
- Nguyễn Nhật Ánh in 2019
- Born: May 7, 1955 (age 71); Quảng Nam
- Occupation: Writer
- Writing career
- Pen name: Nguyễn Nhật Ánh
- Period: 1984-present
- Subjects: Children; Teenagers
- Notable work: Kính Vạn Hoa - Kaleidoscope Cho tôi xin một vé đi tuổi thơ - Give me a ticket to Childhood
- Notable awards: S.E.A. Write Award 2010

Nguyễn Nhật Ánh (born May 7, 1955) is a Vietnamese author who writes for teenagers and adults. He also works as a teacher, poet and correspondent. His works include approximately 30 novels, 4 essays, 2 series and some collections of poems. He is regarded as one of Vietnam's most successful contemporary writers. His best-known series, Kính Vạn Hoa (Kaleidoscope), which contains 54 volumes, was adapted into a television series in 2005.

== Biography ==
Nguyễn Nhật Ánh was born on May 7, 1955, in Quảng Nam province, Vietnam. At an early age, he attended Tiểu La, Trần Cao Vân and Phan Chu Trinh schools. In 1973, he moved to Sài Gòn to pursue a teaching career. After graduating from Ho Chi Minh City Pedagogical University, he was a teacher and a member of the Hồ Chí Minh Communist Youth Union. He has been working as a correspondent for Sài Gòn Giải Phóng journal since 1986 and is responsible for the children's pages and novelette area. He is also a sport commentator on Sài Gòn Giải Phóng (Liberated Saigon) under the pseudonym Chu Đình Ngạn.

== Writing career ==
His first poem was published in a newspaper, aged 13, and his debut poetry collection, Thành phố tháng tư (City in April), in 1984. A year later his first prose work, Trước vòng chung kết (Before the final) was published.

In 1990, he received the A-class Literature for Youth Prize for Chú bé rắc rối (The troubled boy). From 1995 to 2002, he finished his most well-known work Kính vạn hoa (Kaleidoscope), a series including 45 volumes about 3 teenagers, their friendship and school life. The series became a critical and commercial success. In 1995, he was voted the most popular writer in 20 years (1975–1995) and the most notably talented individual in a poll held by Tuổi Trẻ Press. In May 2007, after five years hiatus, Nguyen Nhat Anh resumed Kính vạn hoa in the newspaper Thanh Niên in May 2007, containing nine fresh volumes. The last volume was published in 2010.

In 2007, he published Cho tôi xin một vé đi tuổi thơ (Give Me a Ticket Back to Childhood) which became the best-selling in the 5th HCMC book fair with over 15,000 copies sold out within 10 days. The book won him the S.E.A Award for Children's Writer in 2008.

In 2010, he published Tôi thấy hoa vàng trên cỏ xanh (Yellow Flowers on the Green Grass) which was a huge success in Vietnam, selling 130,000 copies in total. The novel was also adapted to movie of the same name by Victor Vu, released in 2015.

His latest work is Ra bờ suối ngắm hoa kèn hồng (Go to the stream to see the pink lilies), published in January 2022.

== Written works ==
=== Series ===
- Kính vạn hoa (Kaleidoscope) (54 volumes and more)
- Chuyện xứ Lang Biang (Tales of Lang Biang) (4 volumes)

=== Short stories ===
- Thằng quỷ nhỏ (The little brat, 1990).
- Cô gái đến từ hôm qua (The girl from yesterday, 1989).
- Bong bóng lên trời (Balloons in the Sky, 1991).
- Phòng trọ 3 nguời (Rent room for three, 1990).
- Quán gò đi lên (Up from the Inn, 1999)
- Thiên thần nhỏ của tôi (My little angel, 1990).
- Hạ đỏ (Red summer, 1991).
- Bàn có năm chỗ ngồi (Table with five seats, 1987).
- Còn chút gì để nhớ (What's left to remember, 1988).
- Những chàng trai xấu tính (Unkind guys, 1993).
- Chú bé rắc rối (The troubled boy, 1989).
- Mắt biếc (Celestial eyes, 1990; movie adaptation in 2019).
- Nữ sinh (Schoolgirls, 1989).
- Bồ câu không đưa thư (The dove that doesn't bring you letters, 1993)
- Buổi chiều Windows (Windows afternoon, 1995).
- Trước vòng chung kết (Before the finale, 1985)
- Hoa hồng xứ khác (Foreign rose, 1991).
- Những cô em gái (The little ladies, )
- Đi qua hoa cúc (Through the daisy).
- Trại hoa vàng (The yellow flower farm).
- Út Quyên và tôi (Út Quyên and me).
- Ngôi trường mọi khi (The school as always)
- Chuyện cổ tích dành cho nguời lớn (Make-believe for the grown up).
- Tôi là Bêtô (I am Beto)
- Cho tôi xin một vé đi tuổi thơ (Give me a ticket back to Childhood) (Children's writer wins S.E.A. Write Award).
- Đảo mộng mơ (Dreamlike island).
- Tôi thấy hoa vàng trên cỏ xanh (Yellow Flowers on the Green Grass, 2010; movie adaptation in 2015).
- Lá nằm trong lá (Leaves in leaves).
- Người Quảng đi ăn mì Quảng (Quang people eating Quang noodles, 2012)- tạp văn
- Thương nhớ Trà Long - tạp văn
- Sương khói quê nhà - tạp văn
- Có hai con mèo ngồi bên cửa sổ (Two cats sitting beside the windows, 2012)
- Ngồi khóc trên cây (Sitting crying on the tree, 2013)
- Chúc một ngày tốt lành (Have a good day, 2014)
- Bảy bước tới mùa hè (Seven steps to the Summer, 2015)
- Con chó nhỏ mang giỏ hoa hồng (Small dog carrying a basket of roses, 2016)
- Cây chuối non đi giày xanh (Young banana trees wear green shoes, 2018)
- Cảm ơn người lớn (Thank you adults, 2018)
- Làm bạn với bầu trời (Make friends with the sky, 2019)
- Con chim xanh biếc bay về (The returning blue bird, 2020)
- Ra bờ suối ngắm hoa kèn hồng (Go to the stream to see the pink lilies, 2022)
