= Điềm Phùng Thị =

Vietnamese sculptor

Điềm Phùng Thị (August 18, 1920 – January 28, 2002) was a Vietnamese modernist sculptor, considered "one of the masters of Vietnamese modern art."

After training as a dental surgeon and moving to France, Điềm developed an interest in sculpture in midlife and gained recognition in both Europe and Vietnam for her work.

== Early life and education ==
Điềm Phùng Thị was born Phùng Thị Cúc in 1920 in Huế. As a child, she traveled throughout Vietnam with her father, a government bureaucrat, which was her first exposure to her country's native sculptural traditions.

She studied dentistry at Hanoi Medical University, becoming one of the first women to graduate from the university in 1946. She subsequently spent two years fighting against the French in the First Indochina War. However, in 1948 she suffered from paralysis and was brought to France for treatment. After recovering, she remained in the country and obtained a doctorate in dental surgery in 1954. As part of her graduate studies, she researched the tradition of chewing betel leaves in Vietnam.

== Sculpture ==
Điềm did not begin sculpting until she was nearly 40 years old, in 1959. After abandoning her dentistry career and attending art school in Paris, she studied under the sculptor Antoniucci Volti from 1961 to 1963. In the first decade of her artistic practice, Điềm settled into an abstract style, abandoning figurative sculpture. Her signature style focused on what she called "seven modules," a set of seven shapes that could form seemingly infinite combinations. She experimented with a wide variety of materials, including terracotta, stone, metal, wood, lacquer, polyester, and even scraps of B-52 bombs. She drew inspiration from her memories of Vietnam and her experiences as a woman. Điềm has been described as "one of the masters of Vietnamese modern art" and "Vietnam’s answer to Louise Bourgeois."

Her work was exhibited widely across Europe, beginning with a 1966 exhibition at Paris' Bernheim-Jeune gallery. She also held exhibitions in Vietnam, with her first one in 1978 considered one of the country's first exhibitions of abstract art. Additionally, she produced jewelry, as well as art for installation, including at the Vietnamese Embassy in France and the library of Bayeux.

== Death and legacy ==
In 1992, Điềm returned to Vietnam, settling in her hometown of Huế. She died there in 2002, at age 81. Much of her work was donated to the city of Huế, where it is displayed at the Điềm Phùng Thị Art Museum.
