= The Musician at the Dragon Citadel =

- Directed by: Đào Bá Sơn
- Written by: Văn Lê
- Produced by: Trịnh Quốc Hùng, Đào Thái Anh
- Starring: Quách Ngọc Ngoan, Nhật Kim Anh, Trần Lực, Bùi Bài Bình, Đỗ Kỷ
- Cinematography: Đặng Phúc Yên
- Music by: Quốc Trung
- Production company: Hãng phim Giải phóng
- Release date: 2010
- Country: Vietnam
- Language: Vietnamese
- Budget: 7 billion VND

The Musician at the Dragon Citadel (Vietnamese: Long thành cầm giả ca) is a 2010 Vietnamese film based on Nguyễn Du's poem, Long thành cầm giả ca, for the Millennial Anniversary of Hanoi directed by Đào Bá Sơn. The film won the Golden Kite Prize for Best Feature Film, as well as Best Director, Actor, Editing, and Costuming.

== Plot ==
The film opens with a scene of a little girl named Gái (Girl) reflecting in the village well. The girl was born in a peaceful countryside, whose mother used to be a singer, so she had to follow in her mother's footsteps. An acquaintance brought her to Thăng Long Citadel (Present-day Hà Nội) to learn how to play the đàn Nguyễn, she became a student of Master Nguyễn and was given a courtesy name (The name was Cầm). From the first time Master Nguyễn had met Cầm, Master Nguyễn saw in her, a special talent, her playing of the đàn nguyệt shows more emotion than her other counterparts. One day, a rebellion broke out and caused Cầm to leave Thăng Long (Hanoi). The poet Tố Như (Nguyễn Du) meets Cầm and they fall in love. But he already has a wife, and doesn't want to be with her, even when he meets her several times and has intimate sexual encounters with her later. Cầm wonders around aimlessly until she reached her hometown. During this time, the Qing Dynasty invaded Vietnam and a Qing mandarin had captured her along with other people in her hometown. And the mandarin had forced her to play music for him. The Tây Sơn army ambushed the Qing garrison which allowed for Cầm to escape. After this, Cầm becomes a famous singer, while Tố Như began writing poems. Many years later, the two meet when they are both old, feeling sorry, he writes a poem (Long thành cầm giả ca) for her, and she jumps into a well (commits suicide). The movie ends with the narrator saying that on nights when the moonlight shines, people can hear mysterious sounds of a musical instrument coming from the well

== Poem ==
The movie itself is based on Nguyễn Du's poem, Long thành cầm giả ca, where he writes about a beautiful female musician who lives in the Dragon Citadel (Long thành; Hanoi). The original poem was written in văn ngon (literary Chinese), but has been translated into Vietnamese.

Literary Chinese	Sino-Vietnamese	Vietnamese translation	English Translation
龍城佳人	Long thành giai nhân	Người đẹp Long Thành	A beautiful woman in the Dragon Citadel (Long thành; Hanoi)
不記名字	Bất ký danh tự	Họ tên không được biết	Her name we cannot know
獨善絃琴	Ðộc thiện huyền cầm	Riêng thạo đàn huyền cầm	She was talented with the lute (đàn Nguyễn)
舉城之人以琴名	Cử thành chi nhân dĩ cầm danh	Dân trong thành gọi nàng là cô Cầm	The people in the citadel call her Cầm

In the ending credits, the song heard is lines 249-263 of the Tale of Kiều,

Chữ Nôm	Vietnamese alphabet	English translation
銙𡫨窗𦂛，𩄲秦銙𡫨窗𦂛	Khoá kín song the, Mây Tần khoá kín song the	Silk curtains veiled her windows like dense clouds
𦹷紅羅，紅料𡑩𪘵，底𠫾𬩍，𠫾𬩍瞻包	Bụi hồng là, hồng liệu nẻo rằng, để đi về, đi về chiêm bao	And toward the rose within he'd dream his way
旬𦝄缺𠫾，𥒦油𪡱	Tuần trăng khuyết đi đĩa dầu hao	The moon kept wanning, oil kept burning low
𩈘𢠩羅，𢠩想𩈘𪘵，㐌𢚸嗷，㐌𢚸嗷𠵚𢚸	Mặt mơ là, mơ tưởng mặt rằng, đã lòng ngao, đã lòng ngao ngán lòng	His face yearned for her face, his heart her heart
𢩣文𣱬液如銅	Buồng văn hơi giá như đồng	The study room turned icy-metal cold
竹𣊋羅，𣊋𦰟兔𪘵，底絲𦇮，𫣿絲𦇮𫸿鵉	Trúc se là, se ngọn thỏ rằng, để tơ chùng, mấy tơ chùng phím loan	Brushes lay dry, lute strings hung loose on frets
𢅆湘氛拂𫕲彈	Mành Tương phân phất gió đàn	Tương (Xiāng) bamboo blinds stirred rustling in the wind
香𦟍羅，𦟍味𢖵𪘵，底茶看，𫣿茶看𪢊情	Hương gây là, gây mùi nhớ rằng, để trà khan, mấy trà khan giọng tình	Incense roused longing, tea lacked love's sweet taste
爲庄緣𡢻𠀧生	Ví chăng duyên nợ ba sinh	If fate did not mean them to join as mates
爫𫡛羅，𫡛𨑴𢟔𪘵，底傾城，𫣿傾城𠶅𤽗	Làm chi là, chi đem thói rằng, để khuynh thành, mấy khuynh thành trêu ngươi	Why had the temptress come and teased his eyes
𢲔傾𢖵景𢖵𠊛	Bâng khuâng nhớ cảnh nhớ người	Forlorn, he missed the scene, he missed the girl
𢖵坭羅，坭奇遇𪘵，底𫏚𨄼，𫣿𫏚𨄼蹎𠫾	Nhớ nơi là, nơi kỳ ngộ rằng, để vội dời, mấy vội dời chân đi.	He rushed back where by chance the two had met
𠬠𫧜𦹵𠚐𩇢荑	Một vùng cỏ mọc xanh rì	A tract of land with grasses lush and green
渃汵羅，汵𬺚沕𪘵，𣎏𧡊𫡛，𣎏𧡊𫡛姅兜	Nước ngâm là, ngâm trong vắt rằng, có thấy gì, có thấy gì nữa đâu	With waters crystal clear; he saw naught else
𫕲𣊿如𠽖𩂀愁	Gió chiều như giục cơn sầu	The breeze at twilight stirred a mood of grief

== Cast ==
- Quách Ngọc Ngoan as Tố Như
- Nhật Kim Anh as Cầm / Gái (Lady)
  - Hà Anh as Cầm / Gái lúc nhỏ (Young Girl)
- Trần Lực as Nguyễn Khản
- Bùi Bài Bình as Thùy Trung Hầu
- Đỗ Kỷ as Nguyễn Đề
- Mai Thành as Thầy Nguyễn
- Nguyễn Anh Quang as Lý An Quân
- Thi Nhung as Dì Xinh
- Trần Hạnh as Ông lão kéo vó
