= Battle of the Brides =

2011 comedy film by Victor Vu

- Film poster
- Directed by: Victor Vu
- Written by: Victor Vu; Hong Phuc
- Produced by: Pham Viet Anh Khoa; Ngoc Hiep Nguyen
- Starring: Huy Khanh; Ngoc Diep; Le Khanh; Ngan Khanh; Phi Thanh Van; Van Trang
- Cinematography: K'Linh Nguyen
- Release date: 28 January 2011
- Running time: 100 minutes
- Country: Vietnam
- Language: Vietnamese
- Budget: $500,000
- Box office: $1,900,000 (Vietnam) $64,572 (United States)

Battle of the Brides, also known as Cô dâu đại chiến, is a 2011 Vietnamese comedy film directed by Victor Vu, produced by Saiga Films and Vietnam Studio, in association with Galaxy Studios, Phuong Nam Phim, Saigon Movies Media and HK Films. Battle of the Brides was released on 28 January 2011 in Vietnam and broke box office records, becoming the country's highest-grossing movie of all time.

== Plot ==
In the heart of Saigon, Thai and Linh are getting married. But the wedding is suddenly cut short when four other brides show up – threatening to take the groom's life. It turns out that Thai is the biggest player in the city and has been dating all five women at the same time up until the day of his wedding. Trang is an overly jealous flight attendant, Mai Chau is a doctor who loves to party, Quyen is a sexually aggressive chef, and Huynh Phuong is a fiery actress.

As Thai confesses and desperately tries to explain himself to Linh, his multiple lovers unleash their furious vengeance to teach him a lesson he will never forget.

=== Main plot ===
The main character is a rich director named Thai, who wants to win any girl in his life. His first girlfriend is doctor Mai Chau, yet he keeps searching for another one. The other day, Thai sees a beautiful air hostess while driving to the airport, he immediately flirts her. Her name is Trang who has just broken up with ex-boyfriend so she needs a new one to be happy again, as the result, Trang agrees to be Thai's girlfriend.

While having breakfast, Thai encounters the head chef Quyen, upon observing Quyen, Thai likes her unique personality and asks for her phone number. Eventually, Quyen becomes Thai's girlfriend after a few dates. Thai is one of the sponsors for the movie "Ninja Dai Chien" (Battle of the Ninja) directed by one of his friends Khai. Thai meets actress Huynh Phuong who is starred in upcoming movie through a meet up with Khai. Phuong agrees to be his girlfriend after a few days later. The next day, while being outside with Phuong, a girl shows up that stunt everyone including Thai as she is heading to a gallery.

Thai drives Phuong back home in order to quickly come back to the gallery to meet the new girl. She introduces herself as Linh and loves painting. To win Linh's heart, Thai takes Linh to the painter K'Linh to ask him to guide Linh more about painting. Linh becomes Thai's girlfriend within one week. For now, Thai has 5 girlfriends: Mai Chau, Trang, Quyen, Huynh Phuong and Linh. Whenever talking to anyone on the phone, he has to hide in order not to be heard from the other. Thai's father who is Mr. Sang advises him that it's about time to get married, as he begins to carefully evaluate who will be worth to be his wife among 5 girlfriends, he chooses Linh in the end.

Thai shops for a wedding ring to propose Linh, ironically, the rest accidentally know that which causes all of them to assume that Thai wants to propose them. As the result, Thai excellently needs to buy 5 rings for all of his girlfriends. On their wedding day, 4 girlfriends arrive to take his life. Thai and Linh run away, as they stop, Linh tells Thai a story about a chubby girl who used to love Thai but was awfully rejected, she despises Thai afterward and decided to set a revenge. That chubby girl exercised and went on a diet get in shape, Linh reveals that she is that chubby girl. She gets on a car and drives away, while Thai is caught up by 4 furious girlfriends who will teach him a lesson for life.

== Cast ==
- Huy Khanh as Thai
- Ngoc Diep as Linh
- Le Khanh as Quyen
- Ngan Khanh as Trang
- Phi Thanh Van as Huynh Phuong
- Van Trang as Mai Chau

== Reception ==
In Vietnam, the film became one of the country's highest-grossing films of all time. The local Vietnamese audience found the film to be socially relevant in its bleak, yet comedic, depiction of relationships in modern-day Saigon.
