= Meedhoo =

Meedhoo, as a place name, may refer to one of the following locations in the Republic of the Maldives:

- Meedhoo (Dhaalu Atoll)
- Meedhoo (Raa Atoll)
- Meedhoo (Addu)
