= Burning Kisses =

2010 Vietnamese musical film

Burning Kisses (Vietnamese: Những nụ hôn rực rỡ) is a 2010 Vietnamese film; it is one of the few Vietnamese musical films, and features a high-profile Vietnamese cast.

== Synopsis ==
The story is about a group of staff and employees from a resort in Nha Trang, Vietnam. The resort hosts a famous boy band to perform for them in order to keep their business. However, things turn out unexpectedly when the employees have to do the show themselves, and everybody has a chance to show their talents.
