= Christopher Wong (composer) =

Christopher Wong is a film composer. He is known for scores in Vietnamese theatrical films and independent Asian American films including Journey from the Fall, First Morning and The Rebel. He trained under Academy Award winner Jerry Goldsmith.

== Composer credits ==
- The Anniversary (2003)
- First Morning (2003)
- Spirits (2004)
- Journey from the Fall (2006)
- The Rebel (2007)
- Passport to Love (Chuyen Tinh Xa Xu) (2009)
- Yellow Flowers on the Green Grass (Tôi thấy hoa vàng trên cỏ xanh) (2015)
- Dreamy Eyes (Mắt biếc) (2019)
