= Victor Vu =

Vietnamese-American film director (born 1975)

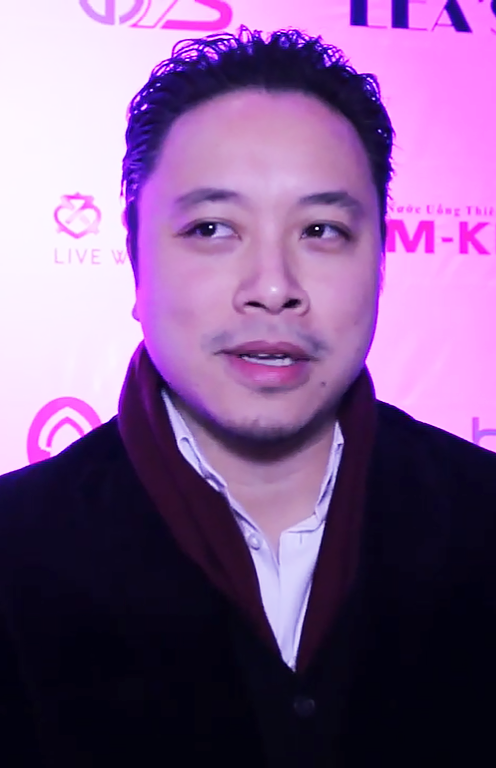
- Victor Vu in 2014
- Born: November 25, 1975 (age 50); North Hollywood, California, U.S.
- Education: Loyola Marymount University (BA)
- Occupations: Film director; producer; writer
- Years active: 1997–present

Victor Vu (Vietnamese: Vũ Quốc Việt; born November 25, 1975) is a Vietnamese-American film director, writer and producer. His films include Blood Letter (2012), Yellow Flowers on the Green Grass (2015), and Dreamy Eyes (2019), the latter two of which were Vietnam's official entries to the Academy Awards for Best International Feature Film. Described as one of the country's most prolific filmmakers, Vu has been credited with helping grow the Vietnamese film industry in the 2010s.

== Early life ==
Vu was born and raised in North Hollywood, Los Angeles, California to parents from Vietnam. He earned his Bachelor of Arts in film production from Loyola Marymount University.

== Career ==
Vu's early films, First Morning (2003) and Spirits (2004), were shot in Southern California, where he lived and attended school. Despite wanting to shoot in Vietnam, his first scripts did not pass the film censorship board, which at the time did not approve of ghost stories. Vu later moved to Vietnam to continue making films, motivated by "a pride [he] felt that [Vietnam] had equally compelling stories and things to explore", after being shown movies from other countries in film school.

In 2010, following the release of Inferno, Vu was accused of plagiarism due to the film's similarities in plot and music to Wolfgang Petersen's Shattered (1991). He denied the allegations, saying that he had never seen Petersen's film. Inferno was ultimately pulled by regulators from the Golden Kite Awards, where it had been in competition for best film.

Vu's later films garnered both critical and commercial success. At the 2012 Golden Kite Awards, Vu's period action film, Blood Letter, won several awards, including Best Feature Film and Best Director. The same year, Scandal received the Film Critics Award for Best Film and the Golden Kite for Best Supporting Actress. His romantic comedy Passport to Love won Audience Choice and Best Supporting Actress at the 2009 Golden Kite Awards.

Yellow Flowers on the Green Grass (2015), about a young boy's coming of age in the 1980s, was awarded the Golden Lotus Prize at the 19th Vietnam Film Festival; it was also Vietnam's entry for Best Foreign Language Film at the 89th Academy Awards, though it was not shortlisted.

In 2025, Vu's horror-thriller Detective Kien: The Headless Horror became Vietnam's second-highest grossing film of the year, and eighth-highest grossing of all time.

== Personal life ==
In 2016, Vu married actress Ngọc Diệp, who has starred in several of his films. They have two sons.

== Filmography ==
=== Film ===
- First Morning (2003)
- Spirits – Oan Hon (2004)
- Passport to Love (2009)
- Inferno – Giao Lo Dinh Menh (2010)
- Battle of the Brides (2011)
- Blood Letter (2012)
- Scandal (2012)
- Battle of the Brides 2 (2013)
- Vengeful Heart (2014)
- Scandal 2: Hao Quang Tro Lai (The Comeback) (2014)
- Yellow Flowers on the Green Grass (2015)
- The Immortal (2018)
- Dreamy Eyes (2019)
- The Guardian (2021)
- The Last Wife (2023)
- Detective Kien: The Headless Horror (2025)

=== Television ===
- Scarlet Hill (2022)
