= Red Rain (2025 film) =

- Theatrical release poster
- Directed by: Đặng Thái Huyền
- Written by: Đặng Thái Huyền; Chu Lai
- Based on: Red Rain by Chu Lai
- Produced by: Nguyễn Trí Viễn
- Starring: Đỗ Nhật Hoàng; Lê Hạ Anh; Steven Nguyễn; Phương Nam; Hoàng Long; Lâm Thanh Nhã; Nguyễn Hùng; Đình Khang
- Cinematography: Lý Thái Dũng
- Edited by: Thân Thị Thu Hằng
- Music by: Cao Đình Thắng
- Production companies: Vietnamese People's Army Cinematography; Galaxy Studio; HKFilm
- Distributed by: Galaxy Studio
- Release date: August 22, 2025 (Vietnam)
- Running time: 124 minutes
- Country: Vietnam
- Languages: Vietnamese; English
- Box office: VND 714 billion (US$ 27 million)

Red Rain (Vietnamese: Mưa đỏ [mɯɤ ɗɔ̂] (Note: Also known by its full title Mưa đỏ: Máu xương đổ xuống – Đất trời lưu danh (lit. 'Red rain: Blood and bones given, names inscribed into earth and heaven'))) is a 2025 Vietnamese epic historical war drama film directed by Đặng Thái Huyền from a screenplay she co-wrote with Chu Lai. An adaptation of the novel of the same name by Chu Lai, it follows a squad of People's Army of Vietnam (PAVN) soldiers throughout the 81-day Second Battle of Quảng Trị at Quảng Trị Citadel in 1972, during the Vietnam War. A joint production by the Vietnamese People's Army Cinematography, HKFilm and Galaxy Studio, the film stars Đỗ Nhật Hoàng, Lê Hạ Anh, Steven Nguyễn, Phương Nam, Lâm Thanh Nhã, Lê Hoàng Long, Đình Khang, and Nguyễn Hùng.

Red Rain premiered on August 18 and 20 in Ho Chi Minh City and Hanoi, respectively, before its nationwide release in Vietnam on August 22, in commemoration of the 80th anniversary of Vietnam's independence. It was met with positive reviews by critics for its portrayal of the battle, cast performances, cinematography, and score, while its characterization and script received some criticism. With a box office gross of 714 billion Vietnamese đồng, Red Rain is the highest-grossing Vietnamese film of all time, and the only Vietnamese film to have grossed at least 600 and 700 billion đồng.

It was selected as the Vietnamese entry for Best International Feature Film at 98th Academy Awards, and was not nominated.

== Plot ==
In 1972, Cường, a Hanoi Conservatory student, gives up the opportunity to study at the Tchaikovsky Conservatory against his mother's wishes to enlist in the PAVN, and is sent to the PAVN-occupied Quảng Trị Citadel. Quang, an officer of the opposing Republic of Vietnam Military Forces, is tasked with retaking the citadel. While en route to the battleground, he encounters Hồng, a civilian, and protects her from harm.

To reach the citadel, Cường and other recruits are ferried across the Thạch Hãn River by civilian supporters, including Hồng. The two become enamored. Arriving at the citadel, Cường forms Squad 1 with Tạ, who assumes the squad's leadership; Bình, a former art student and artist; Tú, a high school student who requested to enlist via a letter written in his own blood while being underage; Sen, a brusque special forces soldier; and Hải, a steadfast former utility engineer. As they begin to defend the citadel from Army of the Republic of Vietnam (ARVN) attacks, Sen becomes increasingly shaken, while Hải discovers a sewer that can be used for emergency getaway.

Meanwhile, the Paris peace talks are underway, with negotiations being directly influenced by the battle in Quảng Trị. To gain grounds, ARVN orders its soldiers to infiltrate the citadel and install their flags. While PAVN soldiers manage to thwart the attempt, Cường is injured after a direct encounter with Quang, and Tú is killed. Cường is nursed back to health by Hồng as their feelings for each other deepen. He refuses to be transferred back to the North for recovery, choosing to stay and continue fighting. Haunted by his defeat, Quang also returns to the battlefield.

Squad 1 is joined by Tấn, a former college freshman, while Sen goes insane from psychological trauma. During another attack, while moving a delirious Sen out of harm's way, Tạ is fatally shot. Affected by his experiences, Cường begins to compose music. ARVN soldiers discover the sewer and use it to lure out and capture Hải. After failing to torture him into persuading his comrades to surrender, they burn him alive. Sen, who has snuck up to the scene, ambushes them with grenades and is killed in the ensuing chaos. Despondent at his comrades' fates, Bình loses composure during another battle, exposing himself to the enemy's line of fire, and is killed.

An agreement on ending the war is reached, resulting in a ceasefire. As PAVN soldiers leave the citadel, Cường and Hồng reunite and affirm their devotions to each other. Cường volunteers to turn back to counter an impending attack by ARVN soldiers, entrusting his belongings to Hồng. At the end of the battle, he engages in melee combat with Thái, another ARVN officer, and then Quang. Cường ultimately triumphs and decides to spare Quang's life. Thái, who has been holding grudges against the latter, opens fire at both. ARVN soldiers who witness the act kill him, as Cường and Quang succumb to their wounds. Tấn, having been sent away from the battle by Cường, is Squad 1's sole survivor.

Years later, during peacetime, Hồng, Cường's mother, and Tấn are seen in the audience as Cường's composition, titled Red Rain, is being performed by an orchestra.

== Cast ==
- Đỗ Nhật Hoàng as Vũ Kiên Cường
- Lê Hạ Anh as Hồng
- Steven Nguyễn as Nguyễn Phúc Quang
- Phương Nam as Nông Văn Tạ
- Lê Hoàng Long as Trần Văn Sen
- Lâm Thanh Nhã as Nguyễn Quang Bình "Bình vẩu"
- Đình Khang as Trương Đình Tú
- Nguyễn Hùng as Phạm Huy Hải "Hải gù"
- Trần Gia Huy as Mai Quốc Tấn
- Lương Gia Huy as Hoàng
- Lê Minh Thuấn as Thái
- Trọng Hải as Commander Trần Bình (Note: The character is based on Trần Quý Hai, the commander of the Quảng Trị front.)
- Hứa Vĩ Văn as Major Trần Quang Lê, also known as Doctor Lê
- Lâm Vissay as General Cao Văn (Note: The character is based on Cao Văn Viên, Chief of the Joint General Staff of the Republic of Vietnam Military Forces.)
- Ngô Thành Tá as General Ngô Quang (Note: The character is based on Ngô Quang Trưởng, Commander of the Republic of Vietnam Military Forces at the Second Battle of Quảng Trị.)
- Nguyễn Quang Quyết as General Hoàng Xuân (Note: The character is based on Hoàng Xuân Lãm, Commander of I Corps, Republic of Vietnam Military Forces.)
- Đinh Thị Thúy Hà as Mrs. Vân, Cường's mother and a member of the Democratic Republic of Vietnam delegation
- Châu Hà Yến Nhi as the Minister of Foreign Affairs of the Provisional Revolutionary Government of the Republic of South Vietnam (Note: The character is inspired by Nguyễn Thị Bình, who held this role in real life.)
- Trần Lực as the Minister of Foreign Affairs of the Democratic Republic of Vietnam (Note: The character is inspired by Nguyễn Duy Trinh, who held this role in real life.)
- Mai Thế Hiệp as the Minister of Foreign Affairs of the Republic of Vietnam (Note: The character is inspired by Trần Văn Lắm, who held this role in real life.)
- Hòa Minzy as a member of the Democratic Republic of Vietnam delegation
- Nguyễn Thanh Vân as a member of the Democratic Republic of Vietnam delegation
- Nguyễn Lạc Huy as a member of the Provisional Revolutionary Government of the Republic of South Vietnam delegation
- Thân Thúy Hà as Mrs. Kiều, Quang's mother
- Đào Lê Phương Hoa as Tú's love interest

Some Vietnamese social media personalities made appearances in minor roles, including Hải Triều, Hà Pu, Phạm Vinh, and David Vinh. Some scenes where soldiers lay down on the operation tunnel was filmed, according to the crew, without any makeup, as these were acted by Vietnam War veterans, some of whom fought in the Second Battle of Quảng Trị themselves.

== Production ==
=== Development ===
Red Rain was adapted by Chu Lai from his 2016 novel of the same name, which won the highest literature awards given by the Vietnamese Ministry of Defence and the Alliance of Arts and Literature Associations of Vietnam that year. Prior to the film adaptation, the novel had been adapted into a stage play and a chèo play, the latter winning the highest award given by the Vietnam Stage Artists' Association in 2021. According to initial plans, Red Rain would be the biggest film production by People's Army Cinematography over a 10-year period.

A 50-hectare set was constructed to recreate scenes from the Quảng Trị Citadel battlefield. Over ten Vietnamese provinces and cities were surveyed during the search for additional filming locations. A number of Quảng Trị province's communes and districts were selected, including Hải Lệ commune, Quảng Trị district, and Triệu Thượng commune. Some scenes were filmed in Paris, France. Nguyễn Thanh Vân and Lý Thái Dũng served as consultant and director of photography, respectively.

=== Filming ===
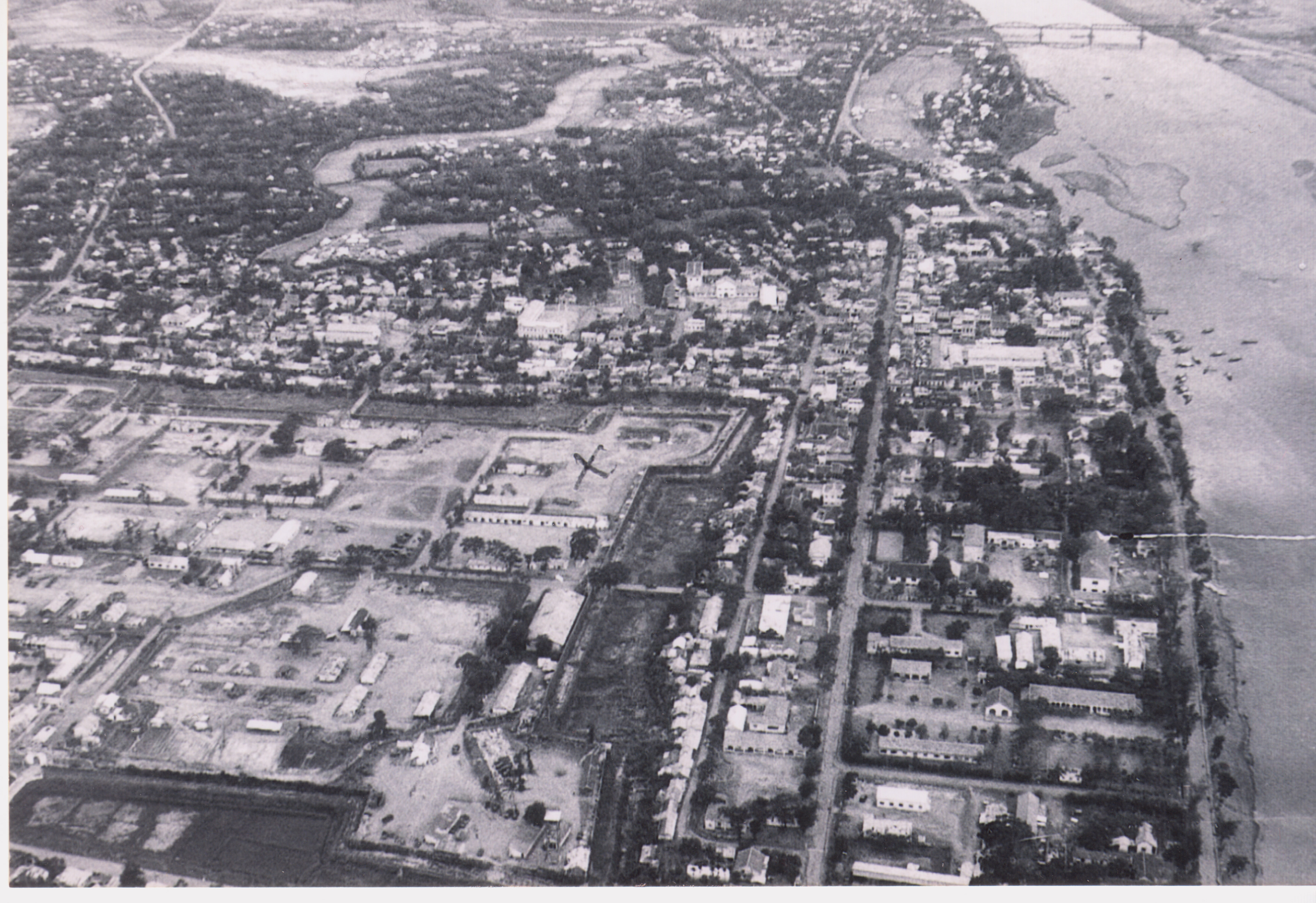
Quảng Trị Citadel (marked by the cross), the setting for the majority of the film.

Filming ran from November 2, 2024, to January 21, 2025, lasting 81 days, mirroring the duration of the battle the film depicts. Hứa Vĩ Văn described the process as akin to actual enlistment rather than mere acting. During filming, Đỗ Nhật Hoàng suffered from a high fever that required him to be hospitalized for four days, impacting filming schedules. Producer and director Đặng Thái Huyền considered measures, from pushing ahead scenes without him to suspending filming and temporarily sending the 300-member crew back to Hanoi, potentially incurring costs. For his role, Đình Khang was required to lose 11 kg in his film scenes that involved being in water at night, while he is unable to swim and has a fear of darkness. He described experiencing near-suffocation while underwater during such a scene. Lương Gia Huy, when rolling through explosions, collided with a metal barrel which caused an ankle sprain. Post-production was completed in July 2025.

=== Music ===
The film's score was composed by Cao Đình Thắng in collaboration with faculty members of the Military University of Culture and Arts, with vocal contributions by Đỗ Thị Phương Mai. Two original songs were produced for the film, including "Còn gì đẹp hơn" written and performed by Nguyễn Hùng, and "Nỗi đau giữa hòa bình" written by Nguyễn Văn Chung and performed by Hòa Minzy, the former serving as a promotional song without being featured in the film. "Còn gì đẹp hơn" topped Spotify's Daily Viral Songs chart in Vietnam.

== Promotion and release ==
On December 10, 2024, Hanoi Radio Television unveiled a 47-second sneak peek of the film featuring scenes of ARVN soldiers evacuating civilians, and PAVN infirmary. On January 28, 2025, Vietnamese People's Army Cinematography posted a New Year's greeting from the cast, which revealed some of its members including Châu Hà Yến Nhi, Trần Lực, Hứa Vĩ Văn, and Phương Nam. On April 22, Galaxy Studio released a teaser trailer which revealed all seven members of Squad 1. On July 17, a second teaser trailer and a number of promotional posters were released. The film's release date was also announced to be August 22, having been originally scheduled for September 2, 2025, the 80th anniversary of Vietnam's independence. The same day, Vietnamese People's Army Cinematography hosted a promotional event for the film, where 40 behind-the-scenes photos and a scale model of the set were displayed. Between the 11th and 13 August, the film's official trailer and theatrical release posters were published. Red Rain became available for pre-sale on August 14 before premiering on August 18. Due to the film's initial box office success, Betting with Ghost: The Gem Hunter, another Vietnamese film set for release close to it on August 28, was delayed to September 5.

== Reception ==
=== Box office ===
On the first day of early screenings, Red Rain grossed 22 billion dong, the highest number for a Vietnamese war film, surpassing Tunnel: Sun in the Dark (20 billion). After its wide release, the film opened to 40 billion dong, the best opening day of all time for a Vietnamese war film, surpassing Tunnel (30 billion dong), and the best opening day for a Vietnamese film not released theatrically during Tết Nguyên Đán. Over the following days, the film gradually became the fastest Vietnamese war film, and the second-fastest overall, to gross 100, 200, and 300 billion dong. In the process, it overtook Tunnel as the highest-grossing Vietnamese war film of all time, and The 4 Rascals as the highest-grossing Vietnamese film of 2025. Afterward, the film became the fastest Vietnamese film to gross 400 and 500 billion dong. On September 7, the film surpassed Mai to become the highest-grossing Vietnamese film of all time. Subsequently, it became the first and only Vietnamese film to gross 600 and 700 billion dong. Red Rain finished its theatrical run on September 29 with a total box office gross of 713.8 billion dong, having sold over 8.1 million tickets. It holds the record for the highest single-day revenue for a Vietnamese film (55 billion dong).

=== Critical response ===
Hà Thu of VnExpress was impressed with the film's set design and visual effects, and its realistic and affecting portrayal of war. She also complimented its camera work, particularly during scenes set at night, and its cast of diverse and likeable characters supported by strong acting performances. She was less positive about the film's romance storyline, certain dialogues and the characterization of some characters. Writing for Elle Men Vietnam, Tuấn Anh further praised the film's cinematography and sound design, and additionally noted that the characterization helps connect the fates of individual characters with the historical context. He criticized the occasionally expository dialogue, the occasional lulls in the pacing, and the underutilization of the supporting cast. Thảo Ngân of Hoa Học Trò echoed the praises for the film's technical aspects, and found the dubbing and dialogue overly theatrical and unnatural, which makes the characters feel less realistic.

=== Accolades ===
List of accolades received by Red Rain
Year	Award	Category	Recipients	Result	Ref.
2025	24th Vietnam Film Festival	Best Art Direction	Vũ Việt Hưng	Won	
2025	24th Vietnam Film Festival	Best Supporting Actor	Phương Nam	Won	
2025	24th Vietnam Film Festival	Best Visual Effects	Red Rain	Won	
2025	24th Vietnam Film Festival	Best Feature Film	Red Rain	Won	
2025	24th Vietnam Film Festival	Best Sound Design	Hoàng Thị Thu Thuỷ	Won	
