= List of highest-grossing films in Vietnam =

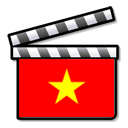

The following is a list of the highest-grossing films in Vietnam, with gross revenue in Vietnamese đồng. This is not an official tracking of figures, as reliable sources that publish data are frequently pressured to increase their estimates.

== Highest-grossing films overall ==
Background shading indicates that the film is not Vietnamese.

#	Title	Director	Country of origin	Total gross (billion dong)	Admissions (million tickets sold)	Year
1	Red Rain	Đặng Thái Huyền	Vietnam	714	8.88M	2025
2	Mai	Trấn Thành	Vietnam	551	6.90M	2024
3	Face Off 7: One Wish	Lý Hải	Vietnam	482	6.02M	2024
4	The House of No Man	Trấn Thành	Vietnam	460	5.75M	2023
5	Dad, I'm Sorry	Trấn Thành, Vũ Ngọc Đãng	Vietnam	395	5.03M	2021
6	Avengers: Endgame	Russo brothers	United States	285	3.59M	2019
7	Avatar: The Way of Water	James Cameron	United States	277	3.48M	2022
8	Face Off: The Ticket Of Destiny	Lý Hải	Vietnam	273	3.43M	2023
9	Detective Kien: The Headless Horror	Victor Vũ	Vietnam	224.8	2.80M	2025
10	Face Off 8: Embrace of Light	Lý Hải	Vietnam	214	2.67M	2025
11	Exhuma	Jang Jae-hyun	South Korea	203.9	2.55M	2024
12	Doctor Strange in the Multiverse of Madness	Sam Raimi	United States	200.5	2.51M	2022
13	Furie	Le-Van Kiet	Vietnam	200	2.50M	2019
14	Minions: The Rise of Gru	Kyle Balda	United States	199.7	2.49M	2022
15	Win My Baby Back	Nhất Trung	Vietnam	191.8	2.39M	2019
16	Avengers: Infinity War	Russo brothers	United States	188.5	2.35M	2018
17	6/45	Park Gyu-Tae	South Korea	181.8	2.27M	2022
18	Dreamy Eyes	Victor Vũ	Vietnam	180	2.25M	2019
19	Blood Moon Party	Nguyễn Quang Dũng	Vietnam	175	2.19M	2020
20	Jailbait	Lê Thanh Sơn	Vietnam	171	2.14M	2017
21	Furious 7	James Wan	United States, China	169.4	2.12M	2015
22	Kong: Skull Island	Jordan Vogt-Roberts	United States	165.7	2.07M	2017
23	The Royal Bride	Bảo Nhân, Nam Cito	Vietnam	165	2.06M	2020
24	The Fate of the Furious	F. Gary Gray	United States, China	162.6	2.03M	2017
25	Aquaman	James Wan	United States	158	1.98M	2018
26	Fast & Furious: Hobbs & Shaw	David Leitch	United States	157.9	1.97M	2019
27	Face Off: 48H	Lý Hải	Vietnam	156.7	1.95M	2021
28	Song of the South	Nguyễn Quang Dũng	Vietnam	140.4	1.74M	2023
29	Godzilla vs. Kong	Adam Wingard	United States	139.5	1.73M	2021
30	Spider-Man: No Way Home	Jon Watts	United States	127.1	1.59M	2021

== Highest-grossing domestic films ==
Background shading indicates that the film is currently showing in theatres.
Background shading indicates that the film is the highest-grossing Vietnamese film of its release year.

List of highest-grossing Vietnamese films
#	Title	Year	Total gross (billion dong)	Genre	Director
1	Red Rain	2025	714	Historical/War/Drama	Đặng Thái Huyền
2	Mai	2024	551 (Note: 520 according to the studio)	Drama/Romantic	Trấn Thành
3	Face Off 7: One Wish	2024	483	Drama/Family	Lý Hải
4	The House of No Man	2023	475 (Note: 475 according to the studio)	Comedy/Drama	Trấn Thành
5	Bunny!!	2026	450	Drama/Romantic	Trấn Thành
6	Dad, I'm Sorry	2021	427 (Note: 427 according to the studio)	Comedy/Drama	Trấn Thành, Vũ Ngọc Đãng
7	The 4 Rascals	2025	332	Comedy/Romantic	Trấn Thành
8	Face Off 6: The Ticket of Destiny	2023	273 (Note: 300 according to the studio)	Action/Comedy	Lý Hải
9	Detective Kien: The Headless Horror	2025	249	Action/Trinh thám	Victor Vũ
10	The Ancestral Home	2025	242	Family/Comedy	Huỳnh Lập
11	Face Off 8: Embrace of Light	2025	232	Drama/Family	Lý Hải
12	Money Kisses	2025	212	Romantic/Comedy	Thu Trang
13	Furie	2019	200	Action	Lê Văn Kiệt
14	Win My Baby Back	2019	192	Romantic/Comedy	Nhất Trung
15	Dreamy Eyes	2019	180	Romantic	Victor Vũ
16	Blood Moon Party	2020	175	Comedy/Drama	Nguyễn Quang Dũng
17	Tunnel: Sun in the Dark	2025	173	Historical/War/Drama	Bùi Thạc Chuyên
18	Leaving Mom	2025	172	Drama/Family	Mo Hong-jin
19	Jailbait	2017	171	Romantic/Comedy	Lê Thanh Sơn
20	The Royal Bride	2020	165	Romantic/Comedy	Bảo Nhân, Nam Cito
21	Face Off 5: 48H	2021	157	Action	Lý Hải
22	The Corpse	2025	150	Horror/Thriller	Pom Nguyễn
23	Song of the South	2023	140	Drama/Drama	Nguyễn Quang Dũng
24	Betting with Ghost	2024	128	Comedy/Drama	Trung Lùn
25	Ma Da: The Drowning Spirit	2024	127	Horror	Nguyễn Hữu Hoàng
26	Hustler vs Scammer	2023	122	Comedy/Drama	Võ Thanh Hòa
27	Chi Chi Em Em 2	2023	121	Comedy/Drama	Vũ Ngọc Đãng
28	Face Off 4: The Walking Guest	2019	118	Horror/Comedy	Lý Hải
29	The Sisters	2024	117 (Note: 96.5 according to Box Office Vietnam)	Horror	Trần Hữu Tấn
30	The Real Sister	2024	113	Comedy/Drama	Khương Ngọc
31	13rd Sister: Three Deadly Days	2020	109	Comedy/Action	Võ Thanh Hòa
32	Quy Cau	2023	109	Horror	Lưu Thành Luân
33	Super Star Super Silly	2018	109	Comedy/Romantic	Đức Thịnh
34	The Soul Lantern	2025	106	Horror	Hoàng Nam
35	Sweet 20	2015	102	Comedy/Romantic	Phan Gia Nhật Linh
36	Let Hoi Decide	2014	101	Comedy/Romantic	Charlie Nguyễn
37	The Last Wife	2023	100	Romantic/Drama	Victor Vũ
38	Em Va Trinh	2022	100	Drama/Musical	Phan Gia Nhật Linh
39	Trang Quynh	2019	100	Comedy/Romantic	Đức Thịnh
40	Gap Lai Chi Bau	2024	92	Romantic/Comedy	Nhất Trung
41	The Guardian Demon	2025	90	Horror	Trần Trọng Dần
42	Spirit Whisker: The Revenant	2024	87	Horror	Lưu Thành Luân
43	My Mr. Wife	2018	87	Comedy/Romantic	Charlie Nguyễn
44	Face Off 3: Imperfect Trio	2018	86	Action/Comedy	Lý Hải
45	Vengeful Heart	2014	86	Thriller/Mystery	Victor Vũ
46	Go-Go Sisters	2018	84	Comedy/Drama	Nguyễn Quang Dũng
47	Naked Truth	2022	83	Romantic/Drama	Đinh Hà Uyên Thư
48	Little Teo	2013	80	Comedy	Charlie Nguyễn
49	Face Off 2: The Studio	2016	80	Action/Comedy	Lý Hải
50	Yellow Flowers on the Green Grass	2015	80	Drama	Victor Vũ

== See also ==
- Cinema of Vietnam
- List of Vietnamese submissions for the Academy Award for Best International Feature Film
