= Việt Anh (actor, born 1958) =

Vietnamese actor

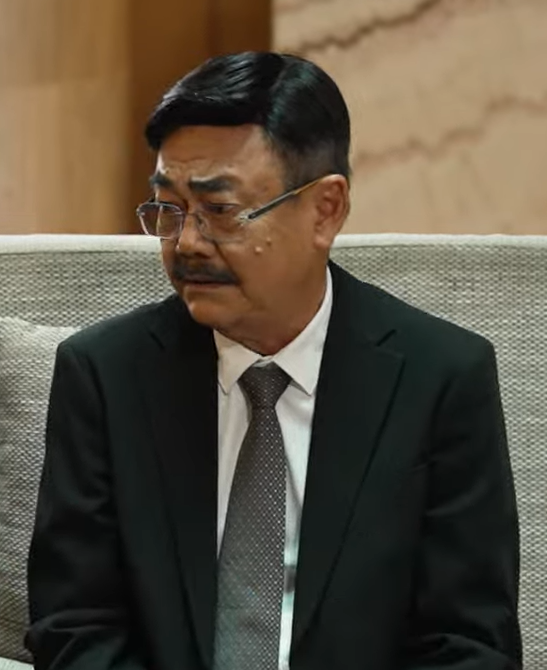
- Born: Nguyễn Văn Liêm; 26 June 1958 (age 67); Saigon, South Vietnam
- Occupations: Actor; director; producer; professor
- Years active: 1984–present
- Title: People's Artist
- Spouses: Phương Linh (m. 1994; div. 2006); Chân Chân (m. 2025)
- Children: 1

Nguyễn Văn Liêm (born 26 June 1958), known as Việt Anh, is a Vietnamese actor and theatre producer. Known for his versatility, he is considered one of the greatest actors from Southern Vietnam.

Since the end of the 20th century, Việt Anh established himself in theatrical works such as Lôi Vũ, Dạ Cổ Hoài Lang, Đẹm Hoạ Mi, 41 Hoa Hồng. He is currently the Director of the 5B Võ Văn Tần Drama Theater.

After more than 40 years of artistic activities, he was awarded the title of Merited Artist of Vietnam and People's Artist by the State.

== Early life ==
Việt Anh was born Nguyễn Văn Liêm on 26 June 1958 in Sài Gòn. Born into a large family with no artistic background, he developed an inclination towards the arts from a young age and began taking music and drama classes in high school.

After finishing high school, he joined the youth volunteers for 4 years and went on to study at the School of Culture and Arts in Ho Chi Minh City. After completing his studies, Việt Anh was unemployed. He eventually auditioned to join the amateur drama troupe at the Ho Chi Minh City Youth Cultural House.

== Career ==
Graduating from the School of Culture and Arts in 1974, Việt Anh starred in many independent theatrical productions. It was not until 1986 that he found his breakthrough role. In Lôi Vũ, the Vietnamese adaptation of Thunderstorm by Cao Yu, his performance as Chu Phác Viên gained critical acclaim by both audience and critics. Việt Anh's performance was praised for its uniqueness from any other adaptations by theatre troupes. As the play gained further popularity around all parts of Vietnam, his interpretation of the character became a model used in all other adaptations of Lôi Vũ.

Lôi Vũ was eventually broadcast on television with coverage extended to all audiences in the South of Vietnam, where Việt Anh starred alongside Thành Lọc, Minh Trang, and Hồng Vân.

In 1995, the actor participated in the nostalgic play of the musician Cao Văn Lầu. Playing the role of Mr. Five to critical acclaim, he received the first Mai Vang award for best male theatrical actor.

After the success of his theatrical projects, Việt Anh began his career as a film actor in 1996. Starting with made for television films such as Cổ tích Việt Nam: Chiếc áo tàng hình, he moved onto feature films such as When Men Get Pregnant (2006), Giving Hired Birth (2006) and The White Silk Dress (2006).

In 2006, following the success of the longform television show Mùi Ngò Gai (Scent of Coriander), Việt Anh received the HTV award for 'Best Actor'. Việt Anh proceeded to star in roles that would cement him into a household name, notable works include: Hoa thiên điểu (2008), Gia đình phép thuật (2009 – 2011), Dù gió có thổi (2009), Mệnh lệnh hoa hồng (2010), Tình yêu và thử thách (2014), Gia đình là số 1 (2017), and Bên kia sông (2018).

In 2012, Việt Anh received the Golden Sickle Prize for the role of the thief in the play “Good, bad, fake, real".

In 2014, after many years of collaboration, he became the director for the 5B Võ Văn Tần Drama Theater.

During what's described as the golden period of theatre in Vietnam, he also directed many famous plays and comedies, including Lui Vu, Nostalgic Prosthetic, Night of Eyelashes, and 41 Roses. After many years of dedication to the theatrical and film arts, Việt Anh was awarded the title of Merited Artist in 2001 and the People's Artist in 2019.

In recent years, he has collaborated with his former student Trấn Thành on a number of feature films. These include Dad I'm Sorry (2021), The House of No Man (2023), and Mai (2024) which became the "highest-grossing movie in Vietnamese history".

== Personal life ==
=== Relationships and family ===
Việt Anh was previously married to actress Phương Linh, whom he met on the set of Lôi Vũ. Together they have one daughter. After their divorce, Phương Linh and their daughter relocated to Australia in 2009.

In 2025, Việt Anh married Chân Chân, who is 36 years his junior.

=== Interests ===
Việt Anh is a dedicated follower of football, often watching the sport and playing for his local team as a midfielder in-between filming and rehearsals. He is an honorary director for the Alumni's Ho Chi Minh City FC (2025), often participating in friendly matches to raise funds for charities.
