= The House of No Man =

Nhà bà Nữ
- Directed by: Trấn Thành
- Written by: Trấn Thành; Đỗ Hoàng Vũ
- Starring: Lê Giang; Uyển Ân; Song Luân; Trấn Thành; Khả Như; Quỳnh Lý; Phương Lan; Dương Lâm; Ngọc Giàu; Việt Anh
- Edited by: Trần Minh Huy
- Music by: Ngô Minh Hoàng; Nguyễn Hoàng Anh
- Production companies: CJ ENM; KIM Entertainment; Trấn Thành Town
- Distributed by: CJ CGV
- Release dates: January 22, 2023 (Vietnam); March 3, 2023 (United States); March 9, 2023 (Australia and Singapore); March 10, 2023 (Canada)
- Running time: 103 phút
- Country: Vietnam
- Language: Vietnamese
- Budget: 30–35 billion VND (1.2–1.4 million USD)
- Box office: 475 billion VND (19.6 million USD) (Note: According to Box Office Vietnam, Nhà bà Nữ grossed 458 billion VND. According to the production team, the movie's gross revenue is 475 billion VND.) (Vietnam); 24 billion VND (1 million USD) (United States)

The House of No Man (Vietnamese: Nhà bà nữ) is a 2023 Vietnamese comedy-drama film directed and co-produced by Trấn Thành. The film stars Lê Giang, Uyển Ân, Song Luân, Trấn Thành, Khả Như, Quỳnh Lý, Phương Lan, Dương Lâm, Ngọc Giàu, and Việt Anh. Inspired by the story of a woman selling crab noodle soup for 300,000 VND that sparked controversy on social media, and the family story of a friend in the entertainment industry of Trấn Thành, the film revolves around the conflicts within the family of Mrs. Ngọc Nữ, who runs a crab noodle soup shop in an old apartment complex.

In April 2022, Trấn Thành announced the release of the film Mai during the 2023 Lunar New Year, but this project was postponed to 2024 after The House of No Man was announced for production. Similarly to Bố già, The House of No Man also explores aspects of family, but delves deeper into the complex relationships within a family. The film was shot in Thủ Đức City from July to October 2022.

The film premiered on January 22, 2023, the first day of the Lunar New Year. With a gross of 475 billion VND, The House of No Man officially surpassed Dad, I'm Sorry to become the highest-grossing film in Vietnamese box office history, receiving mostly praise from critics. In addition to its domestic release, the film was also released in the United States on March 3, in Australia and Singapore on March 9, and in Canada on March 10, 2023. The film received two acting nominations for Uyển Ân and Song Luân at the Vietnam Film Festival 23rd Vietnam Film Festival, and won the Silver Kite Award and the Kite Award for Best Screenplay.

== Production ==
=== Development ===
I come from a poor background. When I was a child, our home was essentially a sewer pipe. Our life was very difficult. Later, my parents' business improved, and my siblings and I grew up striving to achieve what we have today. I am grateful to life for not being born rich, so I could witness many stories of poor laborers. I want to speak for that class, when they have no one to share their feelings with.

— Trấn Thành

In April 2022, Trấn Thành confirmed the launch of a new family-themed film project titled Mai, set to premiere in Vietnam during the 2023 Lunar New Year and featuring renowned actors. However, the producers have not yet disclosed information about the lead female role of Mai. Meanwhile, Trấn Thành also announced that he would play the lead role in Dad, I'm Sorry, one of his previous films. The concept of the film is said to have originated from Trấn Thành and his wife, Hari Won.

The film was also confirmed to have an investment budget of 30 to 35 billion VND, with 80% of the funding coming from Trấn Thành himself. The script for the film Mai was assigned to Nguyễn Thanh Bình, known by the pen name Bình Bồng Bột. On November 1, 2022, the production team announced the release of the film The House of No Man to replace Mai. The film Mai, starring Tuấn Trần, was postponed due to difficulties in finding a lead actress. By the end of 2023, Trấn Thành announced that Phương Anh Đào had been selected as the lead actress for the film, and Mai would be released during the 2024 Lunar New Year.

For these reasons, The House of No Man was created to serve the audience during the 2023 Lunar New Year. Like Dad, I'm Sorry, The House of No Man continues to explore the theme of family. Previously, in August 2022, Trấn Thành shared images from the film's production, including the phrase, "Sometimes I am the director, sometimes I am Phú Nhuận." At that time, The House of No Man project had not yet been announced.

At a press conference, Trấn Thành confirmed that the character of Ngọc Nữ was inspired by the famous crab soup seller Loan in Ho Chi Minh City. Meanwhile, the characters Phú Nhuận and Ngọc Như were formed from stories surrounding a friend of the director. Finally, the story between Ngọc Nữ and Ngọc Nhi was inspired by the real-life story of a person in the Vietnamese showbiz industry. His previous film was confirmed to be inspired by his own family. For this film, Trấn Thành initially provided financial support to producer Đỗ Hoàng Vũ, who is also Trấn Thành and Hari Won's manager, but later accepted the role of director for the project. After Bố già, The House of No Man is the second film directed by Trấn Thành and the first time he directed alone. Trấn Thành stated that the film not only aims to entertain but also delves into family crises, highlighting the values of familial love and child-rearing.

=== Filming ===
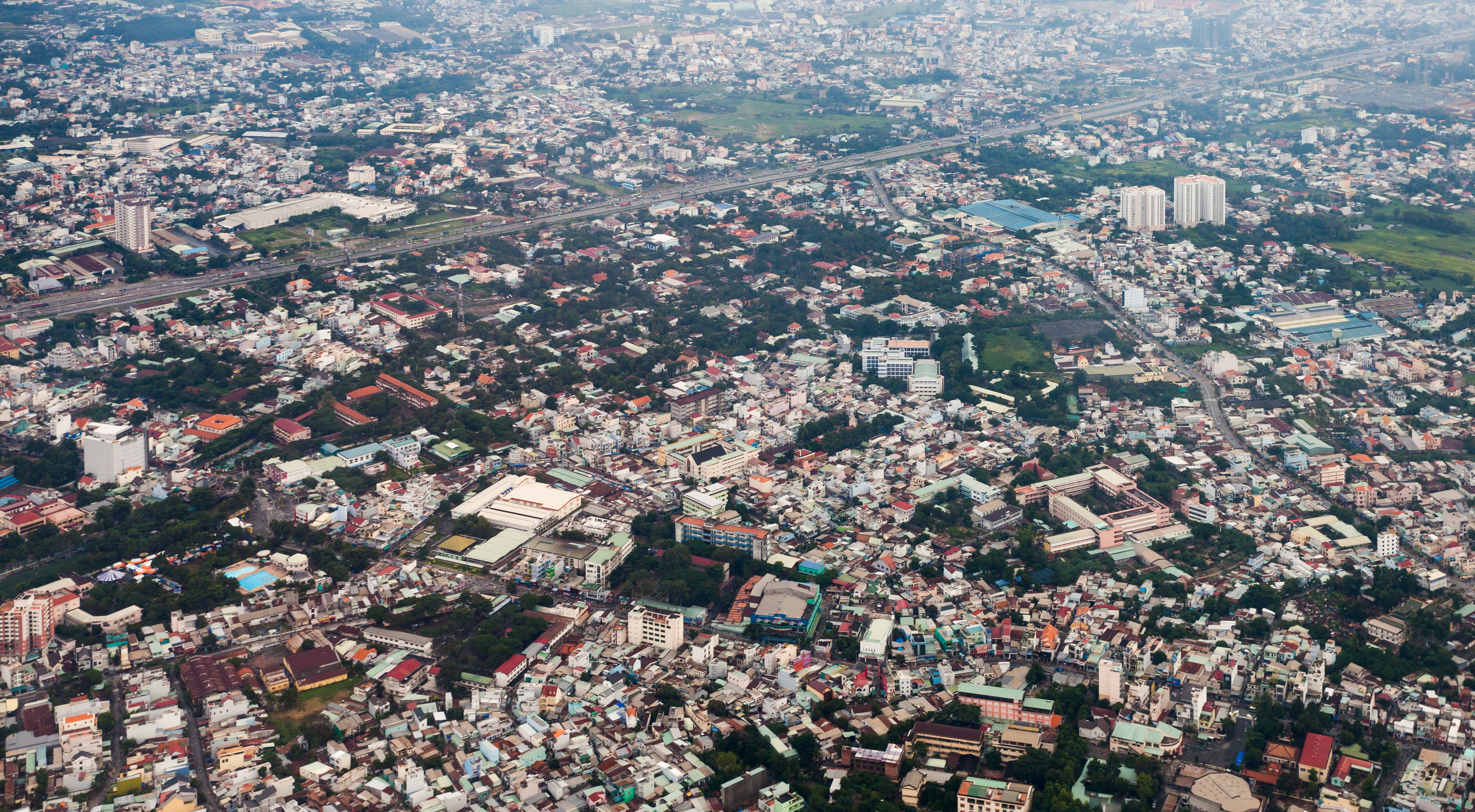
Thủ Đức City, setting of the film

The film began shooting on July 12, 2022. However, at that time, many people still referred to The House of No Man as Mai because the project had not been officially announced. The actor shared that he had not decided to undertake this project, but once he began investing money, he had to follow through, becoming the director and participating in acting. Actress Lê Giang shared that she "feared going on set" and "came home from filming stressed to the point of tears", stating that she felt immense pressure to perform in the film. Meanwhile, Khả Như recounted that Song Luân had to undergo psychotherapy. During the filming period, the director also confirmed on his personal page that he had a fever. Actress Khả Như, who participated in the film, revealed that the project did not have a specific script and "never realized how hard it is to be an actor until this film". During the early days of filming, Khả Như showed signs of exhaustion. Many actors confirmed that they had to change their lines many times. Lê Dương Bảo Lâm stated that the director was so meticulous that he carefully crafted every line. According to Song Luân, who acted in the film, the production team had only one day to meet, discuss the script, and then proceed with filming. He added, "90% of the lines were rewritten [by Trấn Thành] after arriving on set". Filming was completed on October 11, 2022.

During filming, Lê Giang revealed that she had to learn how to cook bánh canh and develop cooking skills to embody the role of the noodle soup shop owner. Uyển Ân, Trấn Thành's younger sister, also participated in the project, playing the daughter of Trấn Thành and Lê Giang in the web drama version of Dad, I'm Sorry. She confirmed that she experienced many emotions and anxieties while taking on the lead role in the film. This was also the first time the actress had taken on a leading role in a feature film. According to Uyển Ân, even though her brother Trấn Thành was the director, she still had to audition along with many other actors. She shared that when she was on the set of The House of No Man, she felt like "[Trấn Thành] no longer saw [her] as his sister". Trấn Thành later confirmed that "the script developed as the ideas came" and that there was no initial script.

=== Music ===
A total of 7 songs appeared in the film, including: "Khi em lớn" by Orange and Hoàng Dũng; "Yêu được không?" by Đức Phúc; "Thích em hơi nhiều" by Wren Evans; "Bước qua nhau" by Vũ; "Đôi lời tình ca" by Hoàng Dũng; "Sập" by Pháo and Tez; and "Rồi tới luôn" by Hồ Phi Nal. Most of the songs appeared in intimate scenes between John (played by Song Luân) and Ngọc Nhi (played by Uyển Ân). Most of the songs are trending tracks in V-pop and especially on the platform TikTok.

No.	Title	Writer(s)	Performed by	Length
1.	"Khi em lớn"	Orange	Orange, Hoàng Dũng	3:48
2.	"Yêu được không"	ViruSs	Đức Phúc	5:32
3.	"Thích em hơi nhiều"	Wren Evans, Mew Amazing	Wren Evans	2:51
4.	"Bước qua nhau"	Vũ.	Vũ.	4:17
5.	"Đôi lời tình ca"	Hoàng Dũng	Hoàng Dũng	4:49
6.	"Sập"	Pháo, Tez	Pháo, Tez	3:08
7.	"Rồi tới luôn"	Hồ Phi Nal	Hồ Phi Nal	4:02
Total length:				28:27

== Release ==
=== Promotion ===
On July 27, 2022, Trấn Thành teased the title of his new film, abbreviated as NBN, and his role as Phú Nhuận in the film through a posted photo. On November 1, 2022, Trấn Thành held a press conference to announce that The House of No Man would replace Mai for the Lunar New Year 2023. At this initial announcement event, Trấn Thành also disclosed to local press that The House of No Man would be more cheerful than Bố già. The film's first promotional poster prominently featured red tones with an image of two hands, one bound on the left and the other free, symbolizing themes explored in the film. Guests at the press conference were treated to bánh canh cua, a dish featured in the film. Shortly after, on November 4, a brief first look clip was released, revealing snippets from the film lasting approximately 40 seconds, accompanied by the line "Every family has secrets...". This line was also seen as a thematic message of the film. On December 3, the film production team unveiled the first poster of the movie featuring hovering busts of Trấn Thành and Song Luân on a table, surrounded by Uyển Ân, Ngọc Giàu, Lê Giang, and Khả Như. The poster also includes the line, "Everyone makes mistakes. But everyone also feels... like a victim." Shortly thereafter, on December 6, the first teaser video was released, which notably did not feature the lead actor Song Luân. Earlier, on December 1, Trấn Thành, Uyển Ân, and Lê Giang attended the 2022 Asian Television Awards in the Philippines. This marked Trấn Thành's first appearance on the international stage to present awards for outstanding works.

On December 27, the film production unit continued to unveil the second poster of the project featuring multiple characters gathered around a bowl of bánh canh (a type of Vietnamese noodle soup). Included in the image are Trấn Thành, Khả Như, Song Luân, Uyển Ân, and Ngọc Giàu. Meanwhile, Lê Giang, in the role of Ms. Nữ, the owner of the bánh canh eatery, stands above them with only her lips visible. The following day, on their official YouTube channel, Trấn Thành released the official trailer for the film. The trailer features a short segment with the song "Yêu được không" by Đức Phúc. During the Green Wave Awards 2022 ceremony, Trấn Thành and his sister Uyển Ân appeared together to announce the winners of the "Male - Female Singer of the Year" category. Prior to the announcement, he also promoted his film The House of No Man.

=== Premiere ===
The House of No Man premiered on the first day of the Lunar New Year Quý Mão 2023 (January 22, 2023). Also scheduled for release during this period were two other Vietnamese films: Sister, Sister 2, directed by Vu Ngoc Dang, and Super Swindler Meets Super Joker, by Vo Thanh Hoa. However, three days before its official premiere, Super Swindler Meets Super Joker was postponed to March 24. Therefore, during the Lunar New Year Quý Mão, there were only two Vietnamese films competing in theaters. During a film premiere event, director Tran Thanh also shared that the film has been rated C16 (suitable for viewers aged 16 and above). On January 26, several unauthorized clips of The House of No Man were leaked on TikTok. These videos garnered tens of thousands of views and revealed parts of the film's content. The film's production team contacted TikTok Vietnam to remove these videos from the platform.

After its domestic premiere, the film crew confirmed that The House of No Man would be released in various U.S. states including California, Texas, Arizona, Utah, Virginia, Kansas, and Florida on March 3; in Australia and Singapore on March 9; and in Canada on March 10. It will premiere in New Zealand on March 17. Internationally, the film is titled The House of No Man. In the U.S. alone, the film premiered in 66 theaters, surpassing the previous project Bố già, which had premiered in only 47 theaters.

== Reception ==
After the film's release, many quotes from the film became famous on social media platforms such as "Failure is also a human right. I'd rather fail in my own dreams than succeed in my mother's dreams", "If they still love, people find a way to stay, no one chooses to leave", and "Everyone makes mistakes but everyone thinks they are the victim". Many clips from The House of No Man became popular on TikTok Vietnam, set to the Vietnamese version of the song "Người từng yêu" by Nhậm Nhiên. Numerous scenes from the film were also illegally recorded and shared on various social media platforms. On the evening of February 1, 2023, the Department of Culture, Sports, and Tourism of Lạng Sơn province launched the Film Week to celebrate the 93rd anniversary of the founding of the Communist Party of Vietnam. At the opening ceremony, two films were screened: the documentary Đoàn kết là sức mạnh and The House of No Man.

=== Box office ===
The film officially premiered on January 22, the first day of the Lunar New Year. By the afternoon of January 21 (New Year's Eve), 30,000 tickets had been sold, setting a record for advance ticket sales for a Vietnamese Tet film. According to Box Office Vietnam, on its first day of release, The House of No Man grossed 23 billion VND. On average, the film earned 1 billion VND every 32–25 minutes. After 3 days in theaters, the film's revenue was four times that of Vũ Ngọc Đãng's Chị chị em em 2, which premiered at the same time. By the morning of January 26, after 4 days of official release, the film had reached 100 billion VND in revenue and sold over 1 million tickets. Since the COVID-19 pandemic until the end of Lunar New Year 2023, only two Vietnamese films have surpassed the 100 billion VND revenue mark: Em và Trịnh and The House of No Man. While Em và Trịnh did not break even despite reaching this milestone, The House of No Man has achieved significant profits. Its revenue growth rate has also been compared to Trấn Thành's previous film Bố già. The film's Tet revenue was six times that of Chìa khóa trăm tỉ, a Tet film released in 2022. According to Tuổi Trẻ, 45% of The House of No Man's revenue came from Ho Chi Minh City, followed by Da Nang, Hanoi, Dong Nai, Binh Duong, Hue...

By January 28, exactly one week after its premiere, the film The House of No Man officially reached the 200 billion VND mark, becoming the fastest film to achieve this milestone in the history of Vietnamese box office, taking only 6 days, whereas Bố già took 9 days. On the morning of January 30, the film officially reached a revenue milestone of 250 billion VND. By the end of January 2023, the film's revenue in Vietnam was second only to Bố già, another film directed by Trấn Thành and Vũ Ngọc Đãng. After 11 days of release, on February 2, the film The House of No Man surpassed the record set by Bố già to become the fastest Vietnamese film to reach 300 billion VND in revenue. On the same day, according to the Box Office Mojo revenue chart, The House of No Man ranked 6th in international weekend revenue (January 26–29), excluding the North American market. By the morning of February 8, 2023, the production team of The House of No Man confirmed that the film's revenue had reached 400 billion VND in 17 days. However, according to the Box Office Vietnam website, the film had only reached 394 billion VND, 6 billion VND less than the production team's figure. After 19 days of official release, the film had sold 5 million tickets. According to information from Box Office Vietnam on the morning of February 13, the film The House of No Man officially reached 421 billion VND, surpassing Bố già with a revenue of 420 billion VND to become the highest-grossing film in Vietnamese box office history. The film's production team confirmed that The House of No Man surpassed Bố già with a revenue of 434 billion VND. According to Tuổi Trẻ, when The House of No Man reached 500 billion VND, its revenue equaled the total revenue of Vietnamese cinema in 2010 and 50% of that in 2012. After an extended release period, the film's team confirmed it concluded with a total revenue of 475 billion VND, equivalent to 5.8 million tickets sold.

Outside the Vietnamese market, tickets for The House of No Man sold out within the first 24 hours in Melbourne, Sydney, Brisbane, Adelaide, Tasmania, and Perth in Australia. In its first week of release in the United States, the film grossed US$560,000 and surpassed one million USD after two weeks of release.

=== Awards ===
Year	Award	Category	Nominee	Result	Reference
2023	Vietnam Film Festival	Best Actress	Uyển Ân as Ngọc Nhi	Nominated	
2023	Vietnam Film Festival	Best Supporting Actor	Song Luân as John	Nominated	
2023	Danaff Awards	Best Film - Vietnamese Film Category	The House of No Man	Won	
2023	Danaff Awards	Best Director	Trấn Thành	Won	
2023	Golden Kite Awards	Best Screenplay	Trấn Thành, Nguyễn Ngọc Huyền Trân	Won	
2023	Da Nang Asia Film Festival	Best Director	The House of No Man	Won	
2024	Blue Star Awards	Best Film	The House of No Man	Won	
2024	Blue Star Awards	Best Director	Trấn Thành	Won	
2024	Blue Star Awards	Best Actress	Lê Giang as Ngọc Nữ	Won	
2024	WeChoice Awards	Film of the Year	The House of No Man	Won	
