= Việt Anh =

Việt Anh may refer to:

- Bùi Hoàng Việt Anh (born 1999), Vietnamese professional footballer
- Việt Anh (actor, born 1958), veteran Vietnamese actor with People's Artist title
- Việt Anh (actor, born 1981), Vietnamese actor
