= Orange (singer) =

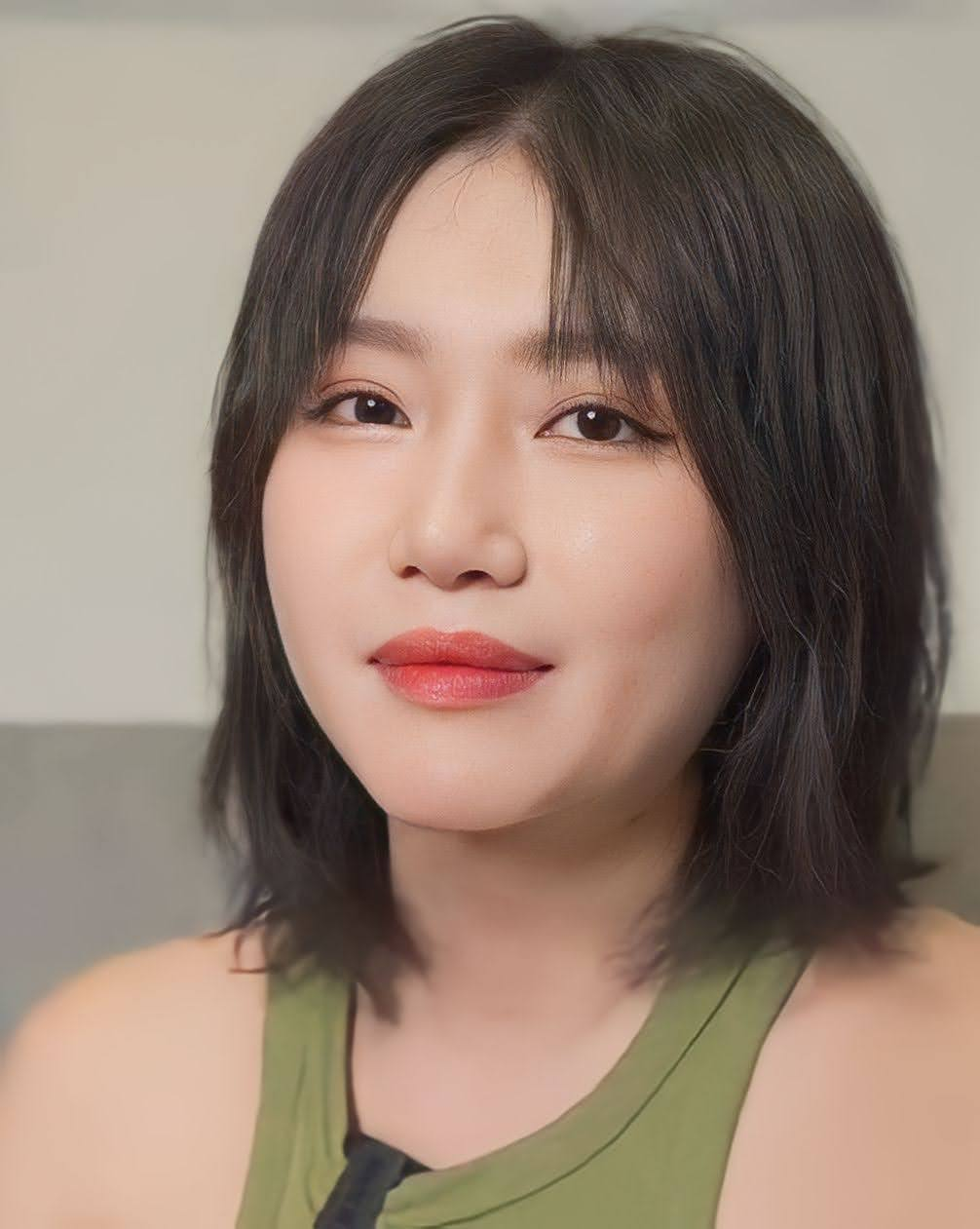
- Orange in 2023

Background information
- Born: Khương Hoàn Mỹ; February 15, 1997 (age 29); Ho Chi Minh City, Vietnam
- Genres: V-pop; dance-pop; R&B; ballad
- Occupation: Singer-songwriter
- Instrument: Vocal
- Years active: 2014–

Khương Hoàn Mỹ (born February 15, 1997), known professionally as Orange, is a Vietnamese singer-songwriter. She rose to recognition with the song "Người lạ ơi" (2018).

== Early life ==
Khương Hoàn Mỹ was born on February 15, 1997 in Ho Chi Minh City. She studied English at Lê Hồng Phong High School for the Gifted and later majored in English linguistics and literature at the Ho Chi Minh City University of Social Sciences and Humanities.

== Career ==
=== 2014–2017: Career beginnings ===
In 2014, Orange competed in the television show The X Factor Vietnam under her birth name and was selected for Hồ Ngọc Hà’s team, and was eliminated in the early stages. In 2017, she won the competition Người hóa thân số 1, organized by Vĩnh Long Television. That same year, she and her friend Đinh Nho Khoa formed the indie music duo Quýt & Nho, performing under the stage name Quýt.

=== 2018–2019: Breakthrough ===
Orange first gained public recognition through her collaboration with Vietnamese rapper Karik on the single "Người Lạ Ơi" (lit. 'Hey Stranger'), released on 6 January 2018. The song reached 50 million views in 13 days and 100 million views in 38 days on YouTube, the fastest music video by Vietnamese artist to do then, while remaining on top of YouTube Vietnam's Trending tab for 15 consecutive days.

In July 2018, she joined the singing competition Giọng Ca Bất Bại but later withdrew, citing health reasons.

On 10 December 2018, Orange won the award for Best New Asian Artist at the 2018 Mnet Asian Music Awards. She also received the Best New Artist award at the 2018 Làn Sóng Xanh Next Step.

=== 2020–2023: "Chân ái", departure from Superbrothers and independent artist ===
On 17 February 2020, Orange collaborated with rapper Khói to release the song "Chân Ái". The track was accused of plagiarism by composer Châu Đăng Khoa, similar to Orange's earlier songs "Người lạ ơi" and "Tình nhân ơi", and was noted by listeners for its resemblance to a theme from a 2014 Hong Kong horror film, Hungry Ghost Ritual. At the end of March 2020, Orange and her colleague LyLy left Superbrothers after publicly exposing alleged ethical violations and contract issues within the company.

Following her departure, Orange transitioned to an independent career. On October 7, 2020, she released the single "OK anh đúng" as a solo artist. Building on this success, she collaborated with Hieuthuhai on a second version of the song. She later appeared on the television show King of Rap as a guest performer supporting contestant ICD.

On 20 April 2021, Orange released a collaboration single with Hoàng Dũng, "Khi Em Lớn", a self-written song of her, which surpassed ten million views. The same year, she joined the program Thần tượng đối thần tượng. On 18 August, she introduced the song "Em Hát Ai Nghe" and also appeared on a billboard screen at Times Square, New York City, as part of Spotify's global EQUAL campaign.

In 2023, Orange competed in the second season of Ca sĩ mặt nạ under the mascot Ong Bây Bi, finishing as runner-up.

=== 2024–: Debut album ===
On January 11, 2024, Orange released her debut studio album titled Cam'On (read as Cảm Ơn, means Thank You). The album consists of twelve self-composed tracks, including "Gặp lại năm ta 60," which she had previously performed on Ca sĩ mặt nạ, along with two pre-release singles: "Có đau thì đau một mình," released on September 18, 2023, and "Đừng kết thúc hôm nay," released on December 7, 2023.

During the Lunar New Year and Valentine season of the same year, Orange collaborated with Hứa Kim Tuyền and the footwear brand Biti's to release a 3-track extended play Nơi pháo hoa rực, featuring "Nơi pháo hoa rực rỡ," "Đôi giày nhầm size," and "Đôi giày không vừa size." The title track served as the eighth installment of Biti's long-running Đi để trở về music campaign, previously performed successfully by Soobin Hoàng Sơn, Phan Mạnh Quỳnh, and Hương Tràm. On July 9, 2024, Orange returned with the single "Em nên yêu cô ta," third single from Cam'On, thematically exploring the notions of "the other woman" and "the main partner." In the same year, she participated in the television program Bài hát của chúng ta on VTV3 and finished as runner-up alongside Thanh Lam.

In 2025, Orange released two singles as part of the soundtrack for the feature film Bộ tứ báo thủ: "Chúng ta còn ở đó không?" and "Một nơi bé nhỏ nào đó." That same year, she became one of thirty female artists featured in the inaugural season of Em xinh "say hi", advancing to the final Best 5 lineup. She also contributed vocals to the track "Nghĩ một tí" from composer 2pillz's studio album Pillzcasso. On September 2, in celebration of Vietnam's National Day, Orange joined Lâm Bảo Ngọc, Muộii, and Lamoon in performing "Hò vươn mình" included in DTAP’s studio album Made in Vietnam.

== Discography ==
- Cam'On (2024)

== Filmography ==
=== Television shows ===
Year	Title	Role	Notes	Ref.
2020	King of Rap	Contestant		
2023	The Masked Singer Vietnam	Ong Bây Bi		
2025	Em xinh "say hi"	Contestant		

=== Web series ===
Year	Title	Role	Notes	Ref.
2024	Xin Việc	Herself		
