= Đặng Thái Huyền =

Vietnamese film director (born 1980)

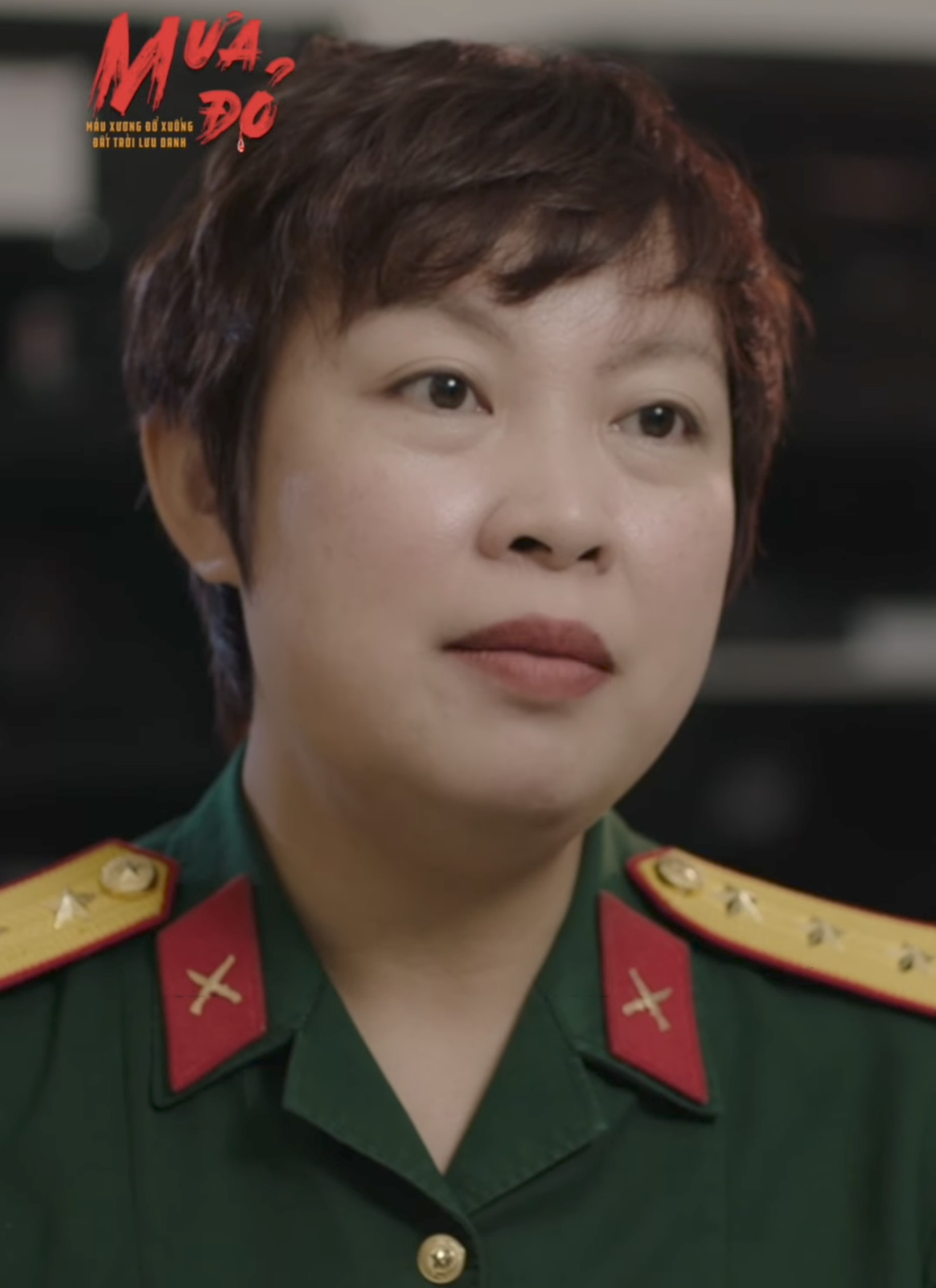
- Born: September 3, 1980 (age 45); Hanoi, Vietnam
- Education: Hanoi Academy of Theatre and Cinema
- Occupation: Film director
- Years active: 2004–
- Military career
- Branch: People's Army Film Studio
- Service years: 2004–
- Rank: Senior Lieutenant Colonel (Thượng tá)

Đặng Thái Huyền (born September 3, 1980) is a Vietnamese filmmaker and a Lieutenant Colonel in the People's Army of Vietnam. She holds the position of Deputy Director in charge of Art at the People's Army Film Studio. In 2024, Thái Huyền was honored by the Vietnamese State with the title of "Meritorious Artist."

== Biography ==
Thái Huyền was born on September 3, 1980, in Hanoi. In her childhood, she dreamed of becoming a lawyer. After finishing high school, Thái Huyền was admitted to the Tourism faculty of the University of Social Sciences and Humanities. In her first year, she came across an admission notice from the Hanoi Academy of Theatre and Cinema and decided to transfer, thinking it would be easier to find a job after graduation. Without a predetermined plan, Thái Huyền arbitrarily chose the Directing major when applying, and graduated as the valedictorian of the 19th class in 2003. She holds a Master's degree in Cinema and Television Arts.

== Career ==
In 2004, director Nguyễn Khắc Lợi invited Thái Huyền to work as the director's assistant for the feature film Tiếng cồng định mệnh ("The Gong of Destiny"). After this film, Thái Huyền applied to work at the People's Army Cinema and was assigned to the Feature Film Studio with the rank of Lieutenant. Six months later, she was assigned to make her debut feature film, Đêm vùng biên ("Night at the Border Area").

In 2009, director Vũ Chính intended to adapt a story by Sương Nguyệt Minh and, being busy with other work, he passed the idea on to Thái Huyền. The video film Mười ba bến nước ("Thirteen River Landings") was born, winning six awards at the 16th Vietnam Film Festival. It won the Golden Kite Award, and Thái Huyền won the award for Best Director. Thái Huyền and cinematographer Trịnh Quang Tùng were classmates. Quang Tùng was the cinematographer for about five of Đặng Thái Huyền's films, winning two Best Cinematography awards for Đêm vùng biên and Mười ba bến nước.

In 2014, Thái Huyền made the video film Đất lành ("The Good Land"), based on an adapted script by Nguyễn Thu Dung. The film later received a Certificate of Merit from the jury at the 2014 Kite Awards. Thái Huyền, along with screenwriter Dung, adapted the story Người về bến sông Châu ("The Return to the Chau River") by Sương Nguyệt Minh into the feature film Người trở về ("The Returnee"). This is considered the last 35mm color film project of Vietnamese cinema at that time. At the 19th Vietnam Film Festival, in the video film category, Đất lành won the Silver Lotus, Thái Huyền won the Outstanding Director award, and Nguyễn Thu Thủy won the Best Lead Actress award. In the feature film category, Người trở về won a Consolation Prize, and Thái Huyền and Dung won the Best Screenplay award.

After Người trở về, Thái Huyền was invited by Saiga Films to co-produce a post-war themed film. She chose to adapt the story Mùi thuốc súng ("The Smell of Gunpowder") by Nguyen Van Tho into a feature film script. Thái Huyền planned to produce two television series, Gừng cay muối mặn ("Bitter Ginger, Salty Salt") and Dạ khúc máu ("Blood Nocturne"), and two feature films, Mùi thuốc súng and Lời nguyền gia tộc ("Family Curse") in 2016. In 2017, the horror feature film Lời nguyền gia tộc was the only project from that plan to be produced and released, making Thái Huyền the first Vietnamese female director to make a horror film.

In 2025, Thái Huyền undertook a war film project titled Mưa đỏ ("Red Rain"), which tells the story of the battle at the Quảng Trị Citadel. The script is based on the novel of the same name by Chu Lai. This is considered the biggest film project in 10 years for the People's Army Cinema. The film was released on the occasion of the 80th anniversary of Vietnam's National Day, breaking some domestic box office records. As of September 19, after nearly a month in cinemas, Mưa đỏ ranked 64th out of the top 100 highest-grossing films of 2025, according to Box Office Mojo.

== Filmography ==
=== Feature films ===
- Người trở về (2015)
- Lời nguyền gia tộc (2017)
- Nơi ta không thuộc về (2018)
- Mưa đỏ (2025)

=== Documentaries ===
- Để lại mùa xuân (2007)
- Chung sức cho ngày toàn thắng (2010)
- Để lại mùa xuân (2015)
- Hành trình hóa giải (co-directed with Nguyễn Quang Quyết; 2018)
- Phim đỏ (2020)
- Chiến thắng Tây Bắc (2020)
- Con đường đã chọn (2021)
- Văn hóa còn thì dân tộc còn (as editor; 2024)
