= Quảng Trị (disambiguation) =

Quảng Trị is a province in central Vietnam

- Quảng Trị ward, former district-level town of Quảng Trị province, now become a ward of the province of the same name
- Citadel of Quảng Trị
- Quang Tri Airport
