= The 4 Rascals =

- Poster
- Bộ tứ báo thủ
- Directed by: Tran Thanh
- Starring: Tran Thanh; Le Duong Bao Lam; Le Giang; Uyen An; Quoc Anh; Tieu Vi; Ky Duyen
- Release date: 29 January 2025 (Vietnam)
- Running time: 133 minutes
- Country: Vietnam
- Language: Vietnamese

The 4 Rascals (Bộ tứ báo thủ) is a 2025 Vietnamese romantic comedy film directed by Tran Thanh and stars Tran Thanh, Le Duong Bao Lam, Le Giang, Uyen An, Quoc Anh, Tieu Vi and Ky Duyen.

== Cast ==
- Tran Thanh
- Le Duong Bao Lam
- Le Giang
- Uyen An
- Quoc Anh
- Tieu Vi
- Ky Duyen

== Premise ==
The film revolves around a love triangle.

== Release ==
The film was released on 29 January 2025 in Vietnam, where it was a hit, becoming the director's "4th title in the Top 5 highest-grossing movies of all time in Vietnam."

== Reception ==
A review in VnExpress wrote: "In terms of cinematic language, The 4 Rascals lacks effective frames that were present in Mai or The House of No Man, and the camera angles in the film are less fresh and innovative. The director uses some techniques to express emotions, such as a close-up shot of a third of the frame when the characters confide or confront each other. In the scene where Karen drives, the camera angle is unstable, sometimes reversed, expressing the character's complex psychology."
