= Quảng Trị province =

Province of Vietnam

Quảng Trị
- Province
- Tỉnh Quảng Trị 省廣治
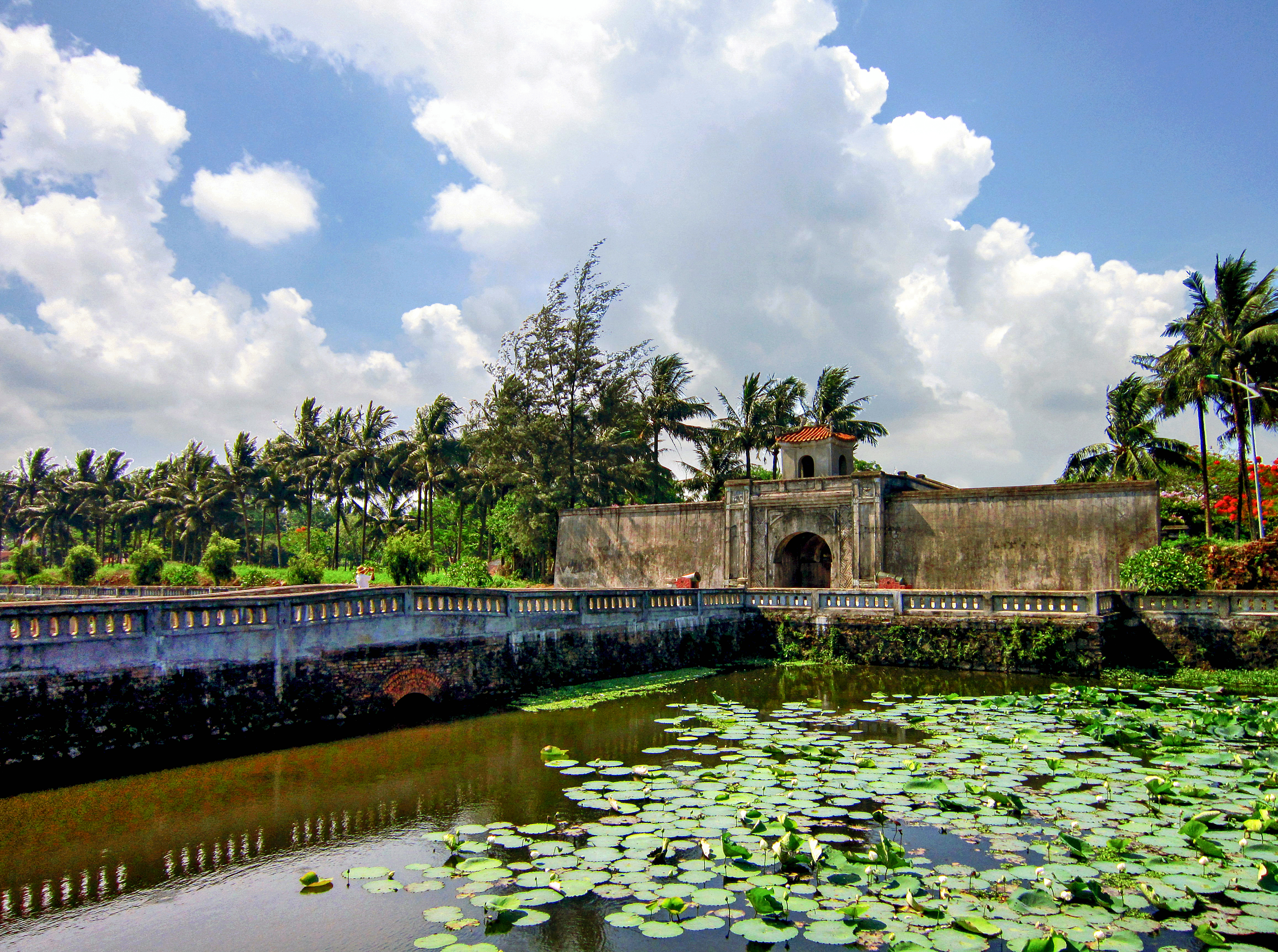
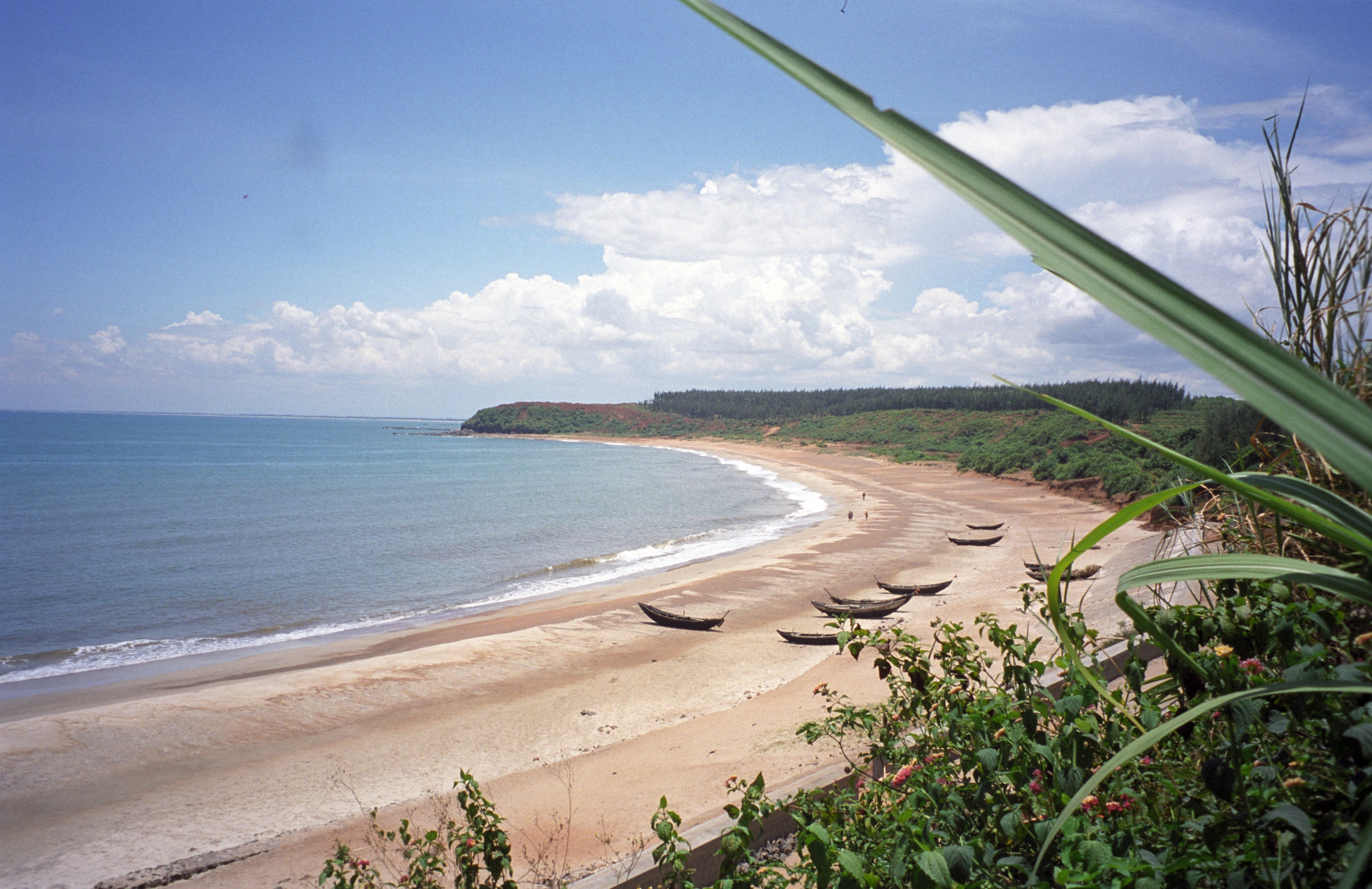
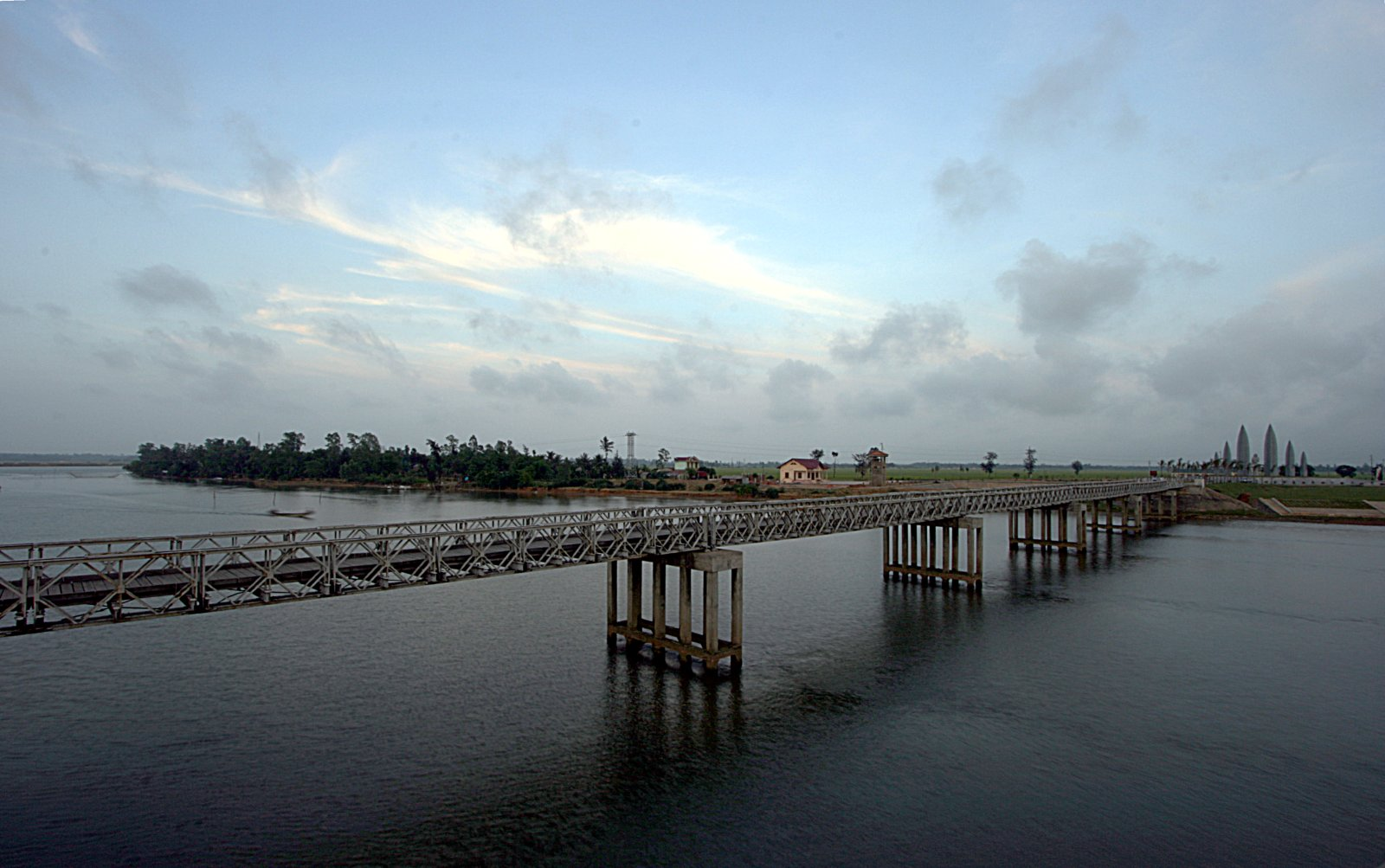
- Clockwise from top: Quảng Trị Citadel; Cửa Tùng Beach; Hiền Lương Bridge

- Seal
- Nickname: Serenity under Reign
- Location of Quảng Trị within Vietnam
- Interactive map of Quảng Trị
- Coordinates: 16°45′N 107°0′E
- Country: Vietnam
- Region: North Central Coast
- Capital: Đồng Hới

Area
  - Total: 12,700 km^{2} (4,900 sq mi)

Population (2025)
  - Total: 1,870,845
  - Density: 147/km^{2} (382/sq mi)

Demographics
  - Ethnicities: Vietnamese, Bru, Hoa, Tà Ôi

GDP
  - Province: VND 53.5 trillion US$ 2.1 billion
- Time zone: UTC+7 (ICT)
- Area codes: 233
- ISO 3166 code: VN-25
- HDI (2020): ▲0.694 (40th)
- Website: www.quangtri.gov.vn

Quảng Trị (Vietnamese pronunciation: [kʷâŋ ʈ͡ʂîˀ]) is a coastal province in the North Central Coast region of Vietnam. It borders Hà Tĩnh province to the north, Huế to the south, Laos to the west and the South China Sea to the east, with 75 kilometres (47 mi) of coast.

== History ==
In the prehistorical period, the lowlands of Quảng Trị and central Vietnam as a whole were occupied by Cham peoples (Champa), speaking a Malayo-Polynesian language. The Qin dynasty of China conquered parts of what later is Central Vietnam at the end of the 3rd century BCE, and administered the indigenous peoples of the area through a commandery, Rinan, for centuries. A rebellion by the Cham in the 2nd century CE overthrew Chinese control and reestablished local government.

Upon the division of Vietnam in 1954 into North and South according to Geneva accords, Quảng Trị became the northernmost province of the State of Vietnam and the Republic of Vietnam, successor of the former. The Vietnamese Demilitarized Zone lay in the province. Beginning 1964, the province gradually became a center for American bases, particularly after October 1966, when the 3rd Marine Division moved to bases just south of the demilitarized zone. In 1966, North Vietnamese forces (PAVN) began occupying the northern region and pushing deeper into the province. The provincial capital, Quảng Trị City, was overrun and occupied by Communist troops in April 1967, and was a battleground during the 1968 Tet Offensive when it was again overrun by North Vietnamese troops before being recaptured by South Vietnamese government and U.S. forces.

Mines Advisory Group (MAG) has been working in Quang Tri since 1999 to clear landmines and explosive ordnance. Roots of Peace is a group that rebuilds in the areas cleared of mines.

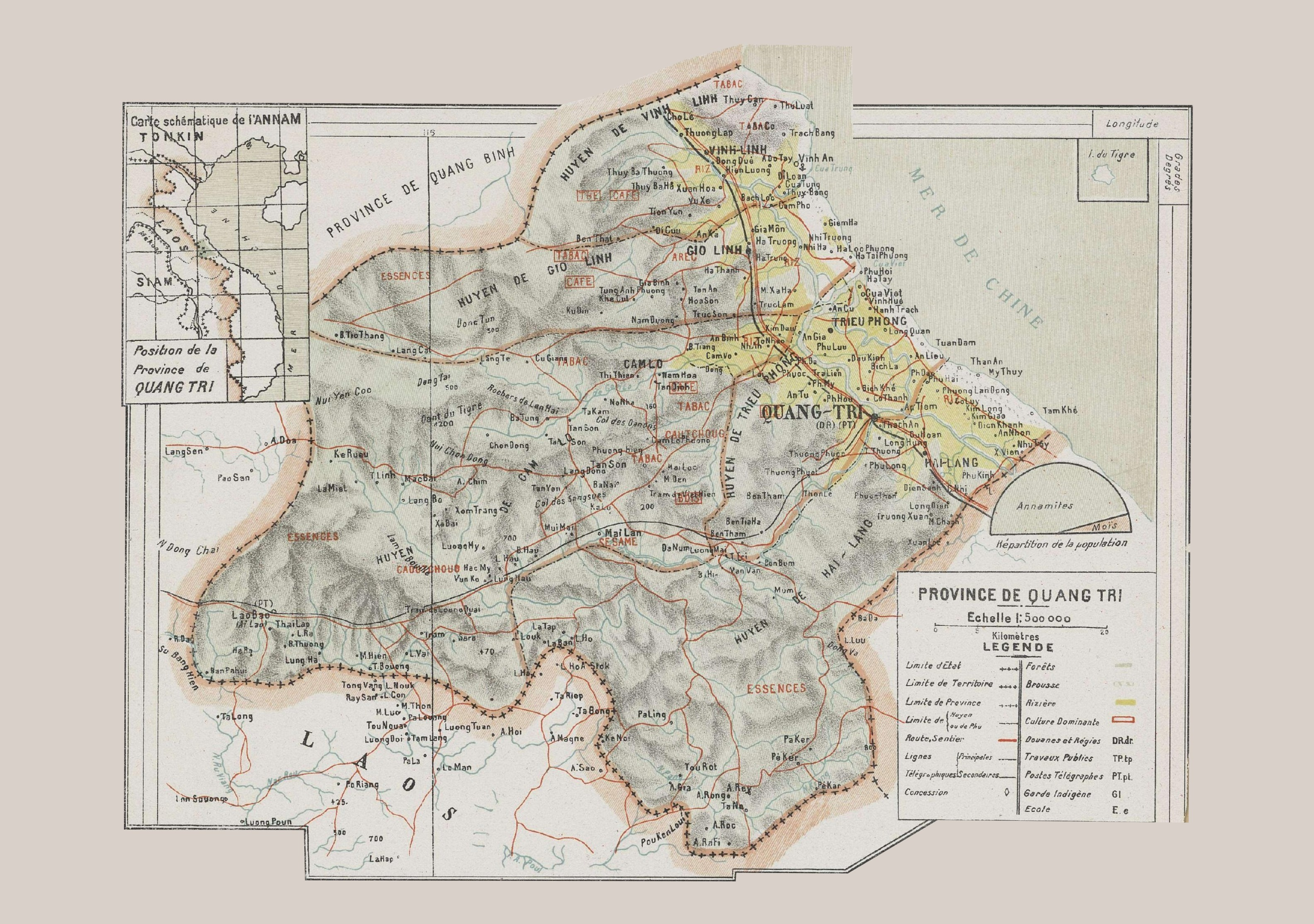
Map of Quang Tri province in 1909

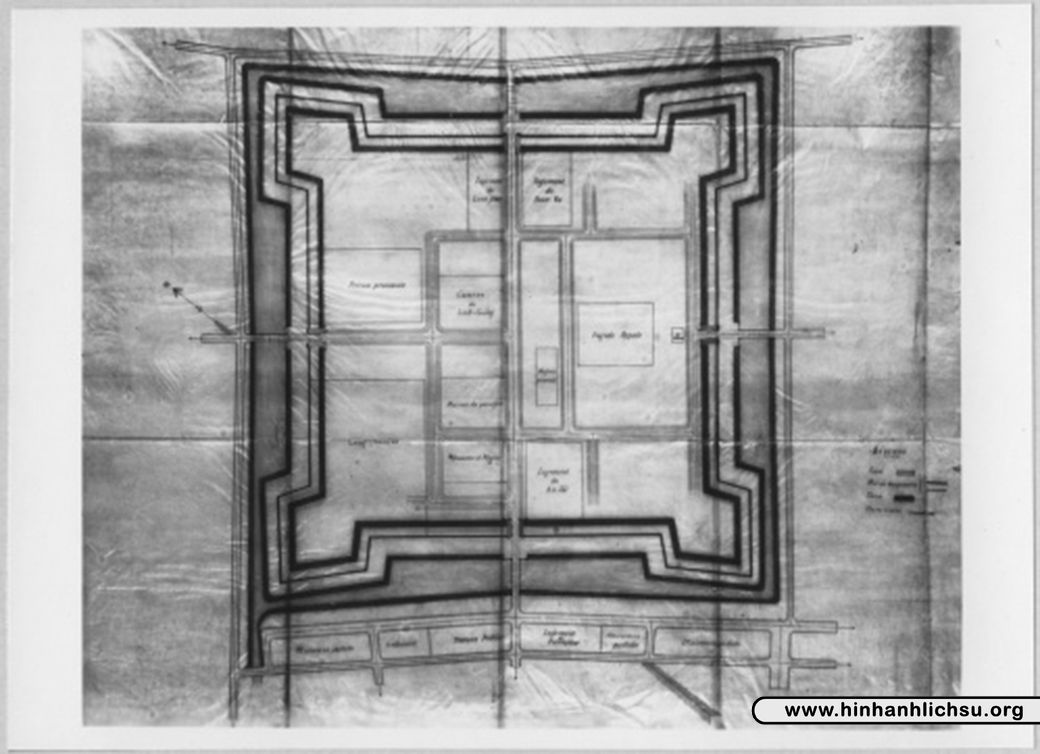
Drawing of Quảng Trị citadel in 1913

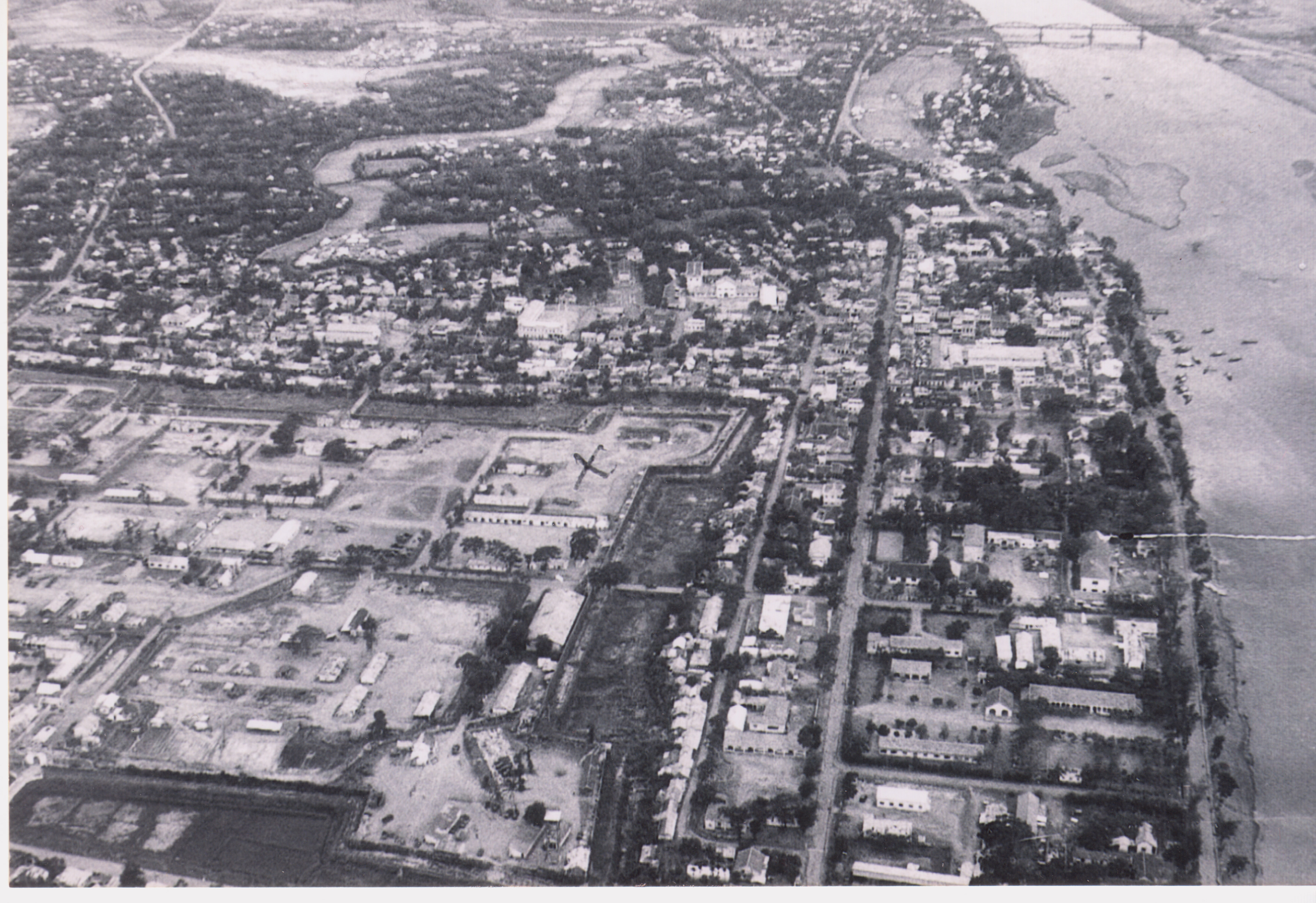
The Quảng Trị Citadel and part of Quảng Trị City looking south, as they were in 1967
