= Lê Hạ Anh =

Vietnamese actress (born 1995)

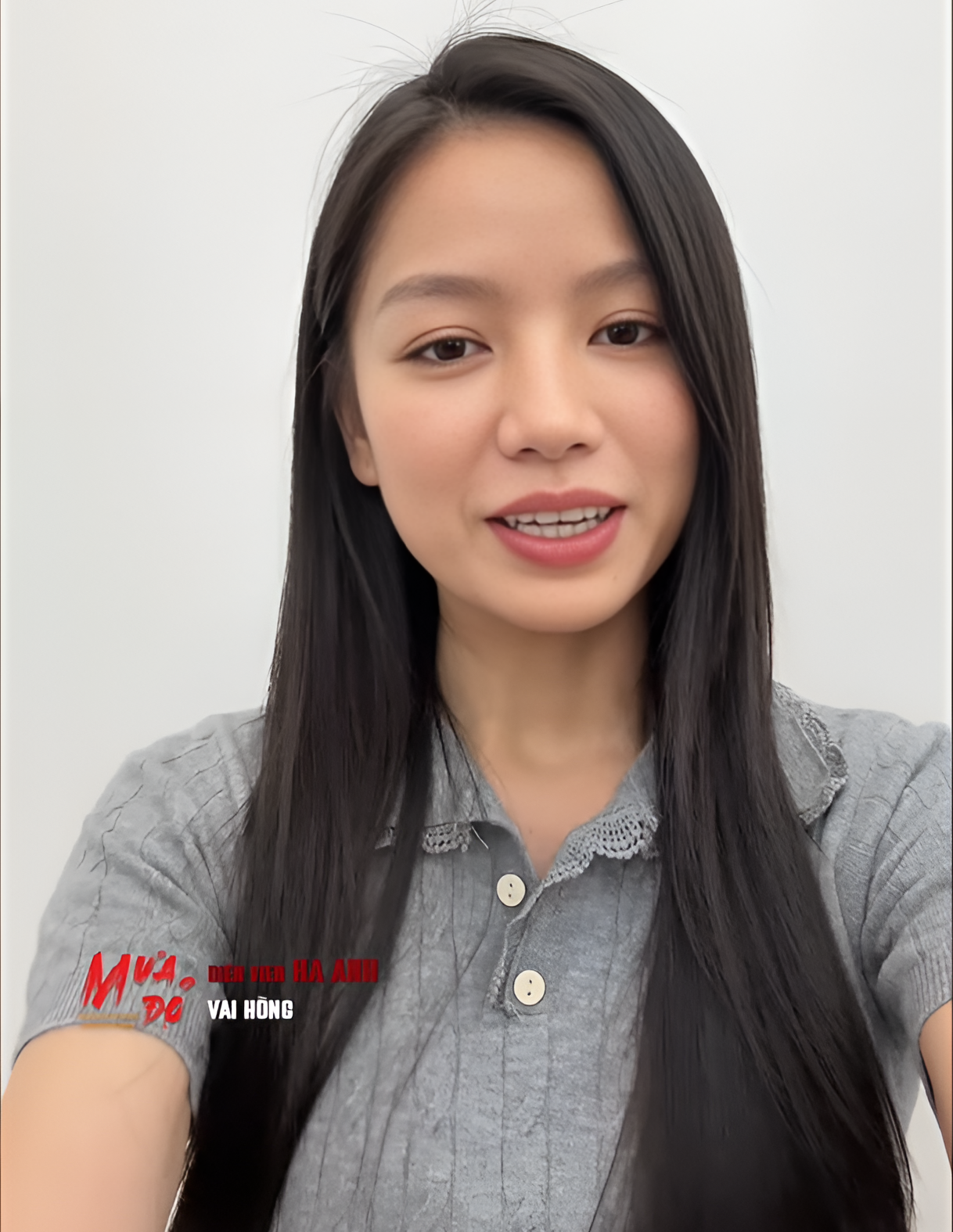
- Lê Hạ Anh in 2025
- Born: August 31, 1995 (age 31); Pleiku, Gia Lai Province, Vietnam
- Occupation: Actress
- Years active: 2011–

Lê Hạ Anh (born 31 August 1995 in Gia Lai Province) is a Vietnamese actress.

== Life and career ==
Lê Hạ Anh was born in Pleiku city, Gia Lai Province, Vietnam on August 31, 1995. She won Fashion Icon 2011 (Ngôi sao thời trang 2011). She played cameo role in series Tiệm bánh Hoàng tử bé, and leading role in its sequel Tiệm bánh Hoàng tử bé 2.
