= Trấn Thành =

Vietnamese actor director and TV presenter (born 1987)

Huỳnh Trấn Thành
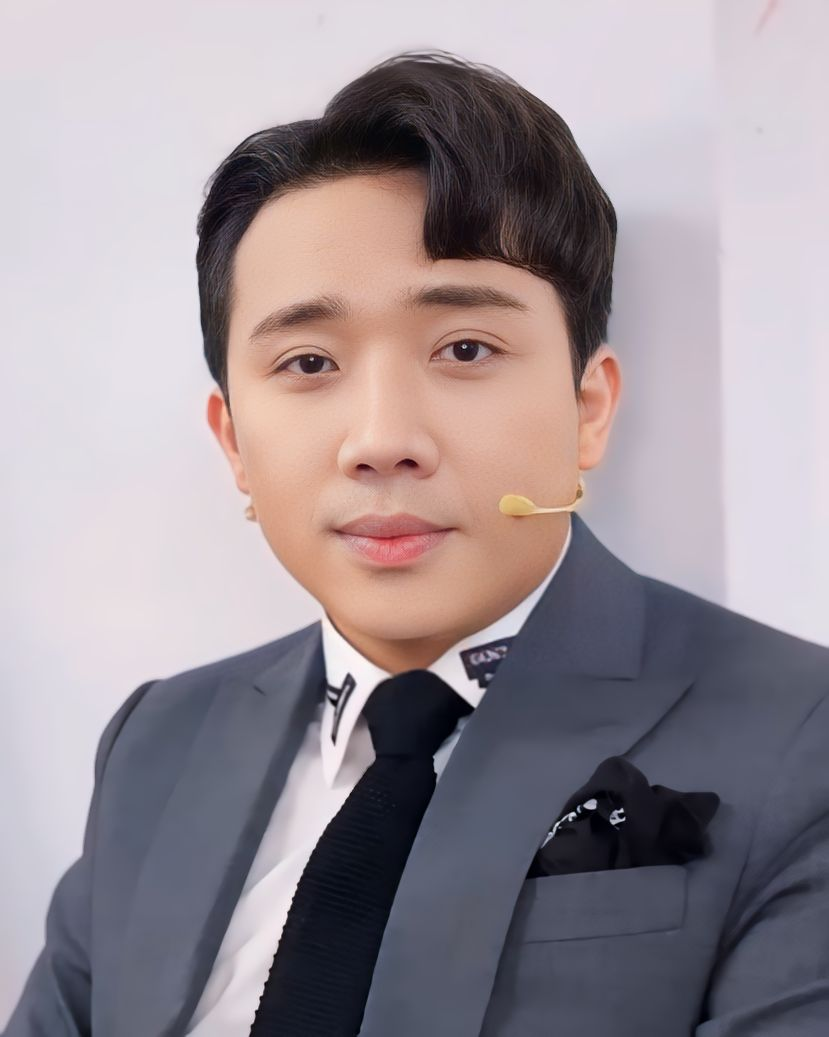
- Trấn Thành in 2019
- Born: Huỳnh Trấn Thành; 5 February 1987 (age 39); Ho Chi Minh City, Vietnam
- Occupations: Comedian; Actor; Television presenter; Director; Voice actor
- Years active: 2006–present
- Spouse: Hari Won (m. 2016)
- Parents: Huỳnh Chấn Liêm (father); Phạm Thị Hạnh Dung (mother)
- Awards: List

Huỳnh Trấn Thành (born 5 February 1987) is a Vietnamese comedian, television presenter, film actor, screenwriter and director. He is the most commercially successful filmmaker in Vietnam, with five of his works ranking among the country's ten highest-grossing films of all time.

== Biography ==
Trấn Thành was born and raised in Ho Chi Minh City. His father is of Chinese descent from Fujian and his mother from Tien Giang.

Trấn Thành trained to pursue his in boxing career when he decided to study sports science at the School of Theater and Cinema in Ho Chi Minh City. Winning third prize in the 2006 Người dẫn chương trình truyền hình competition launched his career as an MC. He demonstrated his versatility and sense of humor in leading the program, such as Nhanh như chớp nhí, Siêu trí tuệ Việt Nam, Người ấy là ai, Rap Việt, Anh trai "say hi", Bài hát của chúng ta, Em xinh "say hi", Xin chào thứ bảy,...

He is able to mimic many voices, such as Lam Trường, Duy Mạnh, Thanh Lam, Hồng Ngọc, Việt Anh, Thành Lộc, Việt Hương, Minh Nhí, Trung Dân and Lệ Thủy. His mimicking ability enabled him to easily work for a voice role in many Vietnamese-adapted animation movies such as Alvin and the Chipmunks: Chipwrecked, Madagascar 3: Europe's Most Wanted, Despicable Me 2 and Turbo.

In May 2016, he was fined 32.5 million VND (equivalent to 1,970 USD in 2025) for playing a role in the comedy play "To Anh Nguyet Remix" (generated from Tô Ánh Nguyệt by Trần Hữu Trang) in Paris by Night 116 show.

== Career ==
Trấn Thành is an artist of many fields; he has worked as a comedian, actor, director, MC, screenwriter, etc. He is a television host in many games shows on TV, such as Nhanh như chớp nhí, Siêu trí tuệ Việt Nam, Người ấy là ai, Rap Việt, Anh trai "say hi", Bài hát của chúng ta, Em xinh "say hi", Xin chào thứ bảy,...

=== Comedy ===
During Trấn Thành's early years in showbiz, he was known mostly through his comedy. Over time, Trấn Thành's career has grown to include becoming a presenter as well as an actor.

== Personal life ==
Trấn Thành can speak English, Vietnamese, Cantonese and Mandarin. He married Vietnamese-Korean singer and actress Hari Won on 25 December 2016, in Ho Chi Minh City. He has two younger sisters named Huỳnh Trinh Mi and Huỳnh Uyển Ân.

== Filmography ==
Year	Title	Role	Notes	Ref.
2017	Tui Là Tư Hậu	Tư Hậu		
2018	Cuộc Gọi Lúc Nửa Đêm			
2019	Cua Lại Vợ Bầu	Hồ Trọng Thoại		
2020	Bố Già	Ông Ba Sang	Web series	
2021	Dad, I'm Sorry	Ông Ba Sang		
2022	Hẻm Cụt	Sáu Ngọt		
2023	The House of No Man	Phú Nhuận		
2023	Đất Rừng Phương Nam	Bác Ba Phi		
2024	Mai	Ông Hoàng		
2025	The 4 Rascals	Cậu Mười Một		
2026	Bunny!!	Trần Trung Kim		
2027	The Sword: Rebirth of the Red Wolf		South Korean film	
