= Box Office Vietnam =

Vietnamese box office revenue aggregator

Box Office Việt Nam
- Website type: Movies, grossing films
- Available in: Vietnamese language
- Creator: Nguyễn Khánh Dương
- Website: boxofficevietnam.com
- Commercial: Yes
- Registration: Optional
- Launched: 2017; 9 years ago
- Current status: Active

Box Office Vietnam is a site that aggregates and analyzes box office revenue data throughout Vietnam. It is also the only unit in Vietnam that collates statistics on the data of cinema clusters, screening rooms, the number of tickets and revenue for the movie market in Vietnam. The newspapers Tuoi Tre, Thanh Nien, Zing News and Radio Free Asia mostly get their updated box office revenue data from Box Office Vietnam.

== Active ==
Box Office Vietnam was founded by Nguyen Khanh Duong in 2017 and is full of movies from 2019. The website is operated based on an algorithmic system to scan the entire screening room nationwide with more than 10 large and small cinema clusters and more than 1200 screening rooms. Currently, this is also the only unit in Vietnam that statistics the data of cinema clusters, screening rooms, the number of tickets and the revenue of the Vietnamese film market.

Statistics of Box Office Vietnam have also been mentioned when taking revenue from movies such as Tuoi Tre, Thanh Nien, Zing News... or Radio Free Asia. Box Office Mojo's Vietnam sales data is also provided by the Box Office Vietnam website.
