= Dad, I'm Sorry =

- Theatrical release poster
- Vietnamese: Bố già
- Directed by: Trấn Thành; Vũ Ngọc Đãng
- Screenplay by: Trấn Thành; Kalei An Nhi; A Quay
- Produced by: Thảo Nguyễn
- Starring: Trấn Thành; Ngọc Giàu; Tuần Trần; Ngân Chi; Lê Giang; Hoàng Mèo; Lan Phương; La Thành; Lê Trang; Quốc Khánh; A Quay; Bảo Phúc
- Music by: Trần Hữu Tuấn Bách
- Production companies: Trấn Thành Town; HKFilm; Galaxy Studio
- Distributed by: Galaxy Studio
- Release date: March 12, 2021
- Running time: 128 minutes
- Country: Vietnam
- Language: Vietnamese
- Budget: 23 billion VND
- Box office: 420 billion VND (Vietnam) $18.4 million (USA)

Dad, I'm Sorry (Vietnamese: Bố già, "Old Father") is a 2021 Vietnamese comedy-drama film produced by Trấn Thành and HKFilm Galaxy Studio directed by Trấn Thành and Vũ Ngọc Đãng, based on the web series of the same name. It stars Ngọc Giàu, Tuấn Trần, Ngân Chi, Lê Giang, Hoàng Mèo, Chế Châu, Minh Tú, Lan Phương, La Thành, Lê Trang, Quốc Khánh, A Quay và Bảo Phúc.

Dad, I'm Sorry is scheduled to be released in the Vietnam on March 12, 2021. It was previously set for release on Lunar New Year (February 12, 2021), but was postponed due to the outbreak of COVID-19. It was selected as the Vietnamese entry for the Best International Feature Film at the 94th Academy Awards.

== Plot ==
In a poor working-class neighborhood in Saigon, there are four brothers, Giàu, Sang, Phú, and Quý. Ba Sang is a single father, raising two children, Quắn and Bù Tọt, alone. Quắn is a YouTuber who makes money from YouTube views. He has a hobby of collecting expensive branded items. Living near Sang and his father is Mrs. Cẩm Lệ, the owner of a tailor shop. Mrs. Lệ appears to be very close to Sang's family and often helps them.

At a party to celebrate her son Bình Lợi's promotion, Mrs. Hai Giàu said a few words that made Quắn unhappy and left. A while later, Út Quý appeared drunk and argued with the people at the party. During the fight, Quý accidentally smashed a beer bottle on Sang's head, injuring him. The next day, Sang and Bù Tọt went to Tư Phú's house for a drink. There, Phú's wife, Aunt Ánh, questioned Sang's decision to take care of Bu Tot, which made Mrs. Cẩm Lệ, who was standing nearby, angry. Mrs. Giàu then appeared, reminding Mr. Sang to pay back the money he had borrowed from her earlier, and at the same time advising him to sell the house he was living in. Bù Tọt told Quắn about this. After saying that, Quắn quickly brought a stack of money to pay Mrs. Giàu.

At midnight, the loan sharks brought Út Quý to Ba Sang's house, threatening that if he did not pay, they would cut off one of Quý's fingers. Although Quắn tried his best to stop him, because he thought of family ties, Mr. Sang gave them ₫10 million. A few days later, Bình Lợi came to Quắn, suggesting that he should buy an apartment to live in. Although he appeared uninterested, Quắn later secretly hid from Mr. Sang to put down a deposit to buy the apartment. He brought this story back to convince his father, advising him to stay in the apartment for a while, and if he found it unsuitable, he could move back. On the first day of moving into the apartment, Mr. Sang invited his relatives to visit the house. There, Quắn suspected Quý of stealing ₫30 million from him. This caused a conflict between Mr. Sang's family and his relatives. Quắn argued with Aunt Ánh and Mrs. Giàu and her children, causing them to leave. Mr. Sang was so angry that he took Bù Tọt and left. A moment later, Mrs. Cẩm Lệ appeared, gave Quắn a gift bag, and told him to find an opportunity to apologize to his father.

A few days later, a woman came to see Mr. Sang, claiming to be Bù Tọt's biological mother, and asked Mr. Sang to give her some money. When her request was not met, this woman went online, claiming to be Trúc Nhàn, Quắn's ex-lover, and revealed that Bù Tọt was their common child. Angry, Quắn called Mr. Sang, criticizing him for taking care of Bù Tọt and affecting his career. However, Mr. Sang confirmed that Bù Tọt was Quắn's biological son, and he was the one who kept it from him. This scandal caused Quắn's career to plummet. He had to find ways to compensate for the contracts. When he learned about the incident, Mr. Sang sold the house he was living in to Mrs. Giàu. He used part of the money to help Quắn, and the rest he bought a pair of earrings for Mrs. Cẩm Lệ. After hearing that his father sold the house, Quan also sold his apartment and brought the money to Mrs. Cẩm Lệ's house, intending to return it to Mr. Sang, but he refused. Right after Quắn left, Mr. Sang suddenly fainted and was taken to the hospital. Test results showed that he had end-stage kidney failure and was forced to have a kidney transplant. Quắn asked to use his kidney to save his father, but Mr. Sang refused, making up the excuse of having a heart disease. At the end of his rope, Quắn went to Tư Phú and his wife, and Mrs. Giàu and her son for help, but everyone refused. Luckily, Quý appeared and agreed to use his kidney to transplant to Mr. Sang. Before the surgery, Mr. Sang confessed his feelings to Mrs. Cẩm Lệ and she agreed. Unfortunately, Quý later encountered a group of strangers and was killed by them. An argument then broke out between Mr. Sang and Quắn about the kidney transplant. Not wanting to implicate his son, Mr. Sang left home and took refuge in a pagoda.

To prepare for his death, Mr. Sang went to buy a coffin and take a memorial photo. Meanwhile, Quắn had to raise Bù Tọt alone while looking for his father. During a live broadcast on his YouTube channel, Quắn confided everything about his family to the audience, and also sent his first apology to Mr. Sang right on the live broadcast. Mr. Sang heard his son's words through the phone screen, was touched and decided to return for surgery. Although the surgery failed and Mr. Sang did not survive, Quắn also realized many things in life. He and Bù Tọt continued to live together, getting used to life without Mr. Sang by their side. The film ended with the message: "We have a lot of time, but our parents do not, choose to love while you still can!"

== Cast ==
- Trấn Thành as Ba Sang
- Ngọc Giàu as Hai Giàu
- Tuấn Trần as Quắn
- Ngân Chi as Bù Tọt
- Lê Giang as Cẩm Lệ
- Chế Châu as Châu
- Hoàng Mèo as Tư Phú
- Lan Phương as Aunt Ánh
- Minh Tú as Trúc Nhàn
- La Thành as Qúy
- A Quay as A Sỉn
- Bảo Phúc as Tủn
- Quốc Khánh as Bình Lợi

== Release ==
Dad, I'm Sorry was scheduled to be released in the Vietnam on February 12, 2021; however, because of the COVID-19 epidemic's severity in Hai Duong and some other localities, it was postponed. On February 24, Tran Thanh announced the film's new premiere schedule on March 12, around the same time as Bao Nhan and Nam Cito's Gái già lắm chiêu V. The film had its press and media premiere on the afternoon of March 4, and had early screenings from March 5 to March 8, 2021.

== Reception ==
=== Box office ===
After two days of sale, by the evening of March 3, 2021, Dad, I'm Sorry sold nearly 12,000 tickets, earning more than VND 1.2 billion (equivalent to USD 60,000 in 2024). By noon on March 4, according to Tran Thanh's announcement, the total revenue from pre-booked tickets was nearly VND 2 billion. On the first day of early screening (from 18:00 on March 5), the film had more than 1,200 screenings – the highest number of early screenings after 18 hours for a Vietnamese film – with nearly 37,000 tickets sold, earning an additional 3.6 billion, thereby raising the total revenue to nearly VND 6 billion (Box Office Vietnam). On the afternoon of March 6, the release announced that the film had collected VND 10.6 billion within the first 6 hours of early screening, becoming the second highest-earning early-release film in Vietnam after Avengers: End game.

As of the morning of March 7, 2021, according to Box Office Vietnam, the total box office revenue of Dad, I'm Sorry is more than VND 33.8 billion. With nearly 7,000 screenings from March 5 to March 8, more than Gái già lắm chiêu V, the film is expected to soon reach over VND 100 billion in revenue.

== Possible sequel ==
In an interview broadcast on Vietnam Television (VTV) on March 14, 2021, Trấn Thành said he had no plans to make sequels to Dad, I'm Sorry, adding: "For me, the content of a work must have enough material for part 2, part 3, then we should continue. I do not, for profit or because people like it too much, create a work that has the breath of past success, that would be boring. For me, an artist likes continuous creativity so that the audience has more choices."

== See also ==
- List of submissions to the 94th Academy Awards for Best International Feature Film
- List of Vietnamese submissions for the Academy Award for Best International Feature Film
