= Citadel of Quảng Trị =

Historical site in Vietnam

Coordinates: 16.7539°N 107.1895°E

The Quảng Trị Citadel (Vietnamese: Thành cổ Quảng Trị, or Cổ thành Quảng Trị; lit. Ancient Fort of Quảng Trị ) is a historical site of a 19th-century fort on the bank of Thạch Hãn River, in the heart of Quảng Trị town, Quảng Trị province, Vietnam. The citadel once hosted the administration office of the Nguyễn dynasty (1802–1945), and later that of the French colonial regime and the American-backed southern regime, while also functioning as a military defense system.

The citadel is mostly remembered as the site of the Second Battle of Quang Tri between the communist forces against South Vietnam and its US ally during the Vietnam War. Today, the citadel, along with seven other historical sites commemorating the Second Battle of Quang Tri is recognized as one of the Special National Sites of Vietnam in the fourth round of rating proposed by the Ministry of Culture, Sports and Tourism of Vietnam.

== History ==
=== Nguyễn dynasty ===
According to documents, at the beginning of emperor Gia Long's reign, Quang Tri citadel was constructed in the Tiền Kiên ward. In 1809, wanting to secure the North of the then capital Phú Xuân, the emperor ordered to move the citadel to Thạch Hãn commune (i.e. the present location), which he deemed a position with strategic advantages in terms of politics, economy, and military.

Initially, it was a fort constructed using rammed earth, but in 1887, the emperor Minh Mạng had it rebuilt using bricks.

Between 1809 and 1945, the Nguyễn dynasty used the citadel as a military base and administrative headquarter. Since 1929, the French colonialists have added prison facilities here and used this site to imprison people from the native political opposition.

=== Republic of Vietnam ===
The ancient citadel of Quang Tri is the site of the Second Battle of Quảng Trị, a large battle in the Vietnam War between the People's Army of Vietnam and the National Liberation Front of South Vietnam against the United States Armed Forces and the Army of the Republic of Vietnam. After 80 days, the Allies and South Vietnam successfully recaptured the citadel and the majority of Quảng Trị Province, while the North Vietnam retained the Northern half of the province. In the battle, the US and South Vietnam expended an exceptionally high amount of ordnance. Up to 20,000 artillery shell per day was fired at an area of less than 3 square kilometers. It is estimated that the total amount of ordnance used is as high as 328,000 metric tonnes.

=== Socialist Republic of Vietnam ===
In the 1990s, the People's Committee of Quảng Trị province restored the citadel as a historical site. Some sections of the city walls were restored and the four main gates were rebuilt. A memorial was erected in the center of the citadel commemorating "the 81 days and nights of 1972". Currently, it is the largest park in Quang Tri Town. Because of the brutality and high casualty of the battle, the Ancient Citadel is considered by the locals as a "Spiritual Land", because it is believed that every inch of land in the area contains ordnance, but more significantly blood and bones of soldiers on both sides. The Museum of the Ancient Citadel of Quảng Trị preserves and display many memorabilia of the battle, such as unsent letter of soldiers written for their families.

== Layout ==
Map: Layout of the Ancient citadel of Quang Tri, 1889

The citadel has a square plan, 2,160 meters in circumference, and a total area of 18.56 hectares. The walls are roughly 4m in height, 13.5m thick at the foot, and roughly 70 cm at the parapet surrounded by a flooded defensive moat, and with four protruding bastions at the corners.The citadel was built in conformity with Vietnamese defensive architectural style, with square-shaped curtain walls built from large baked brick, adhered using lime, molasses, and some other additives. It has four main gates opened to the four cardinal directions. The gates are 3.4m wide arched gates at the center of each wall section. Each gate has a gazebo at the top, with tiled hip-and-gable roof.

== Gallery ==
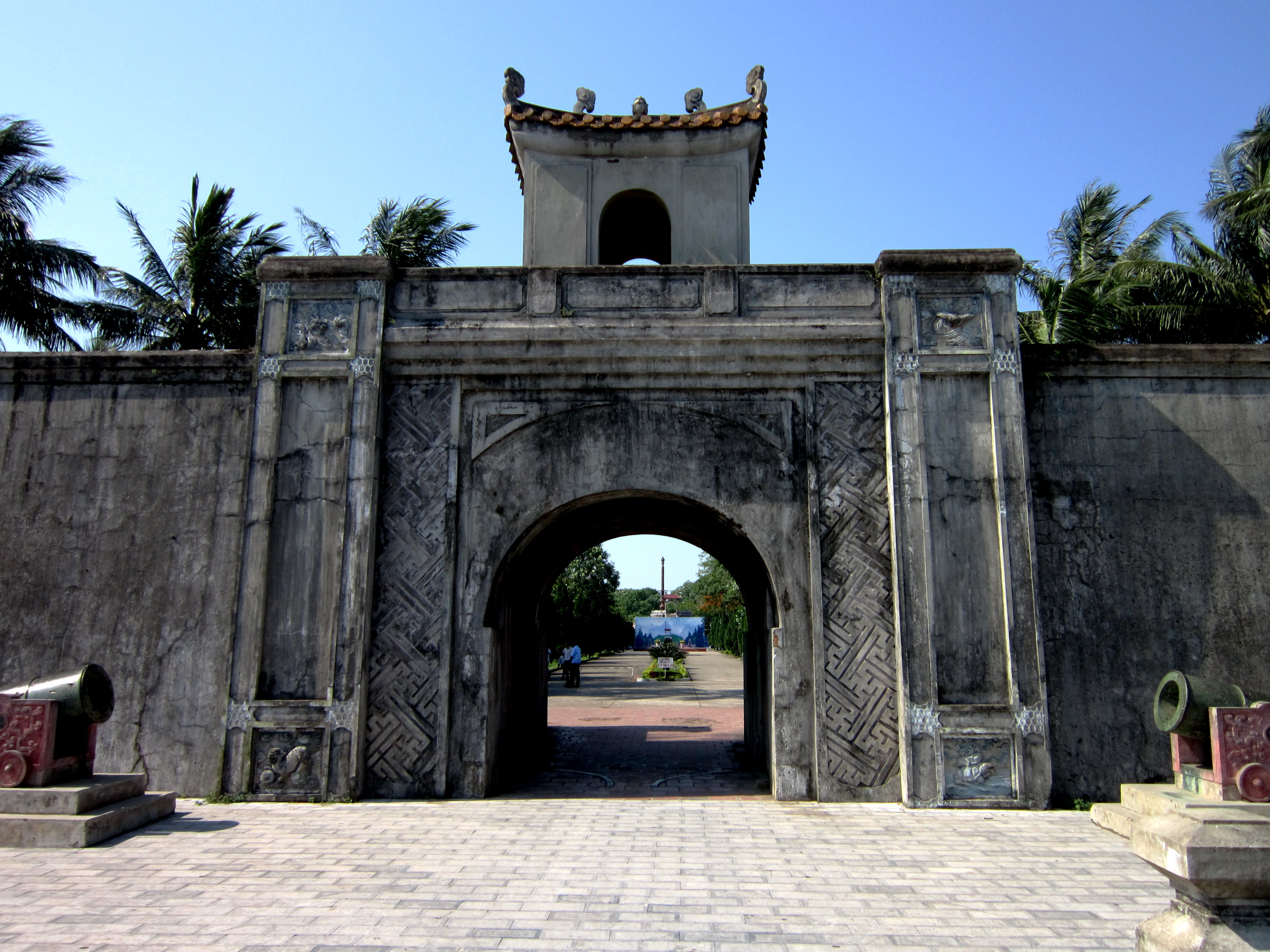
The main (southern) gate of the citadel

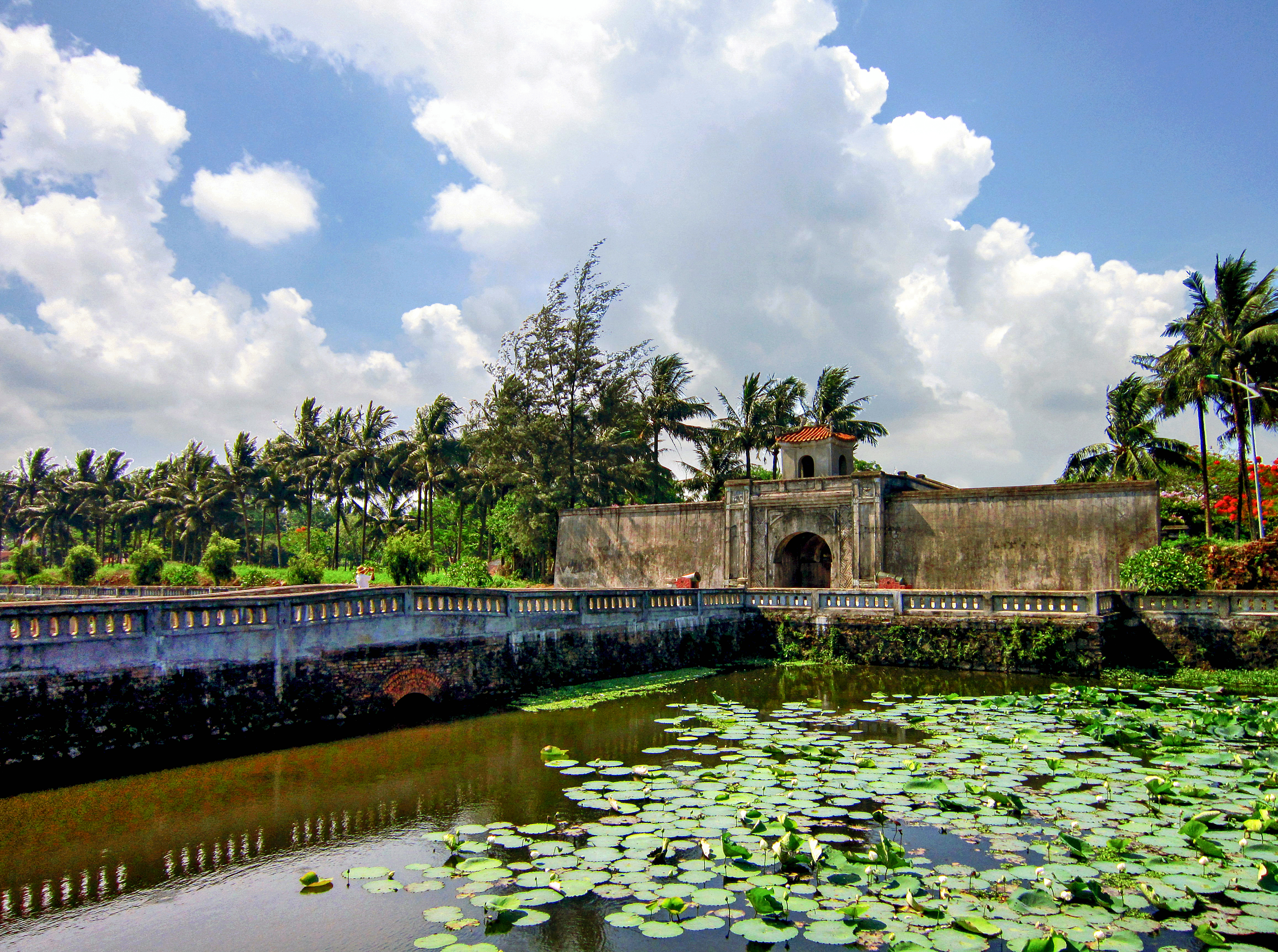
Ancient citadel of Quảng Trị.

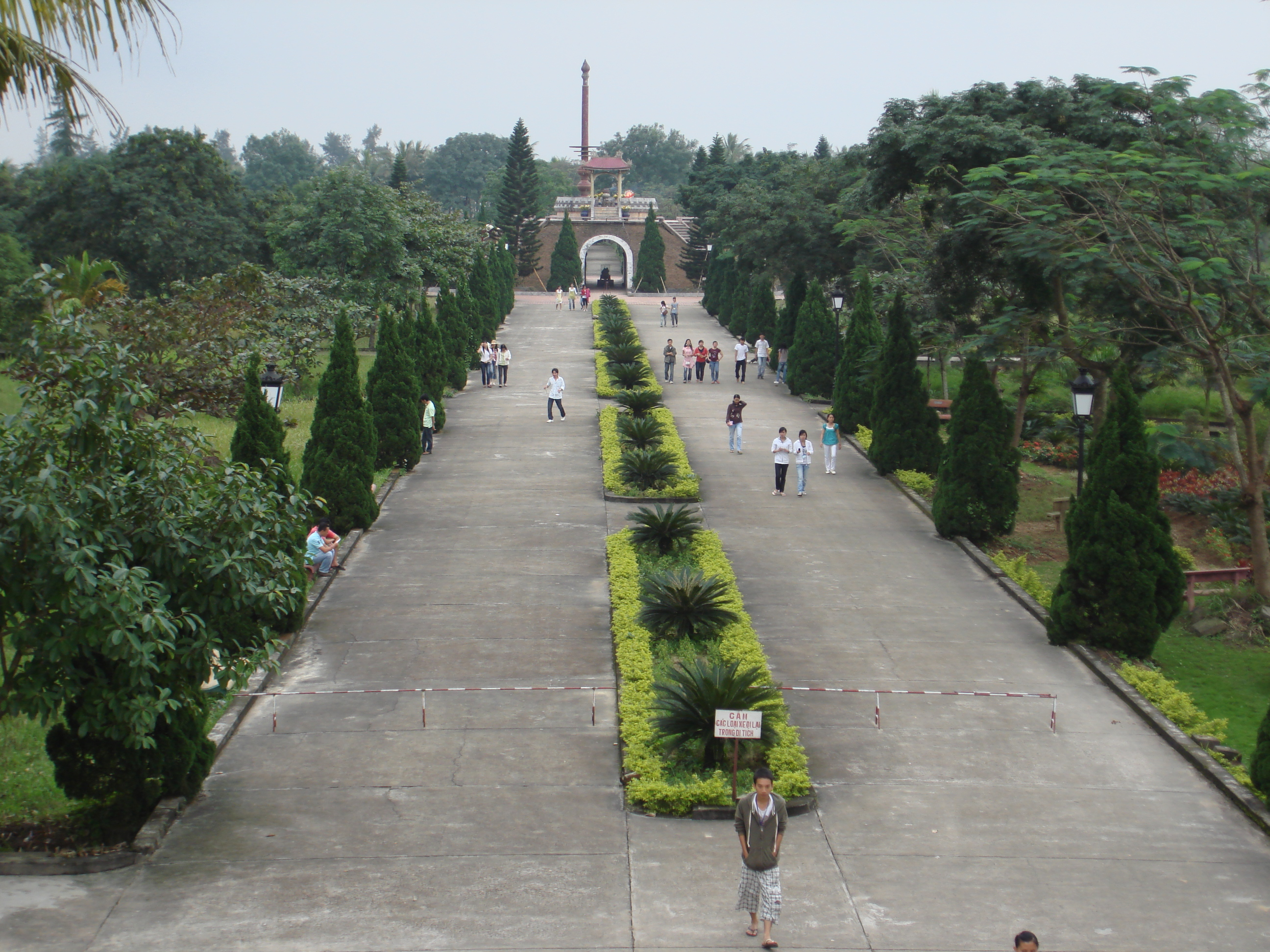
Monument in the citadel (The green hill, top-center, is made as a "common grave" to commemorate the soldiers who died in battle)

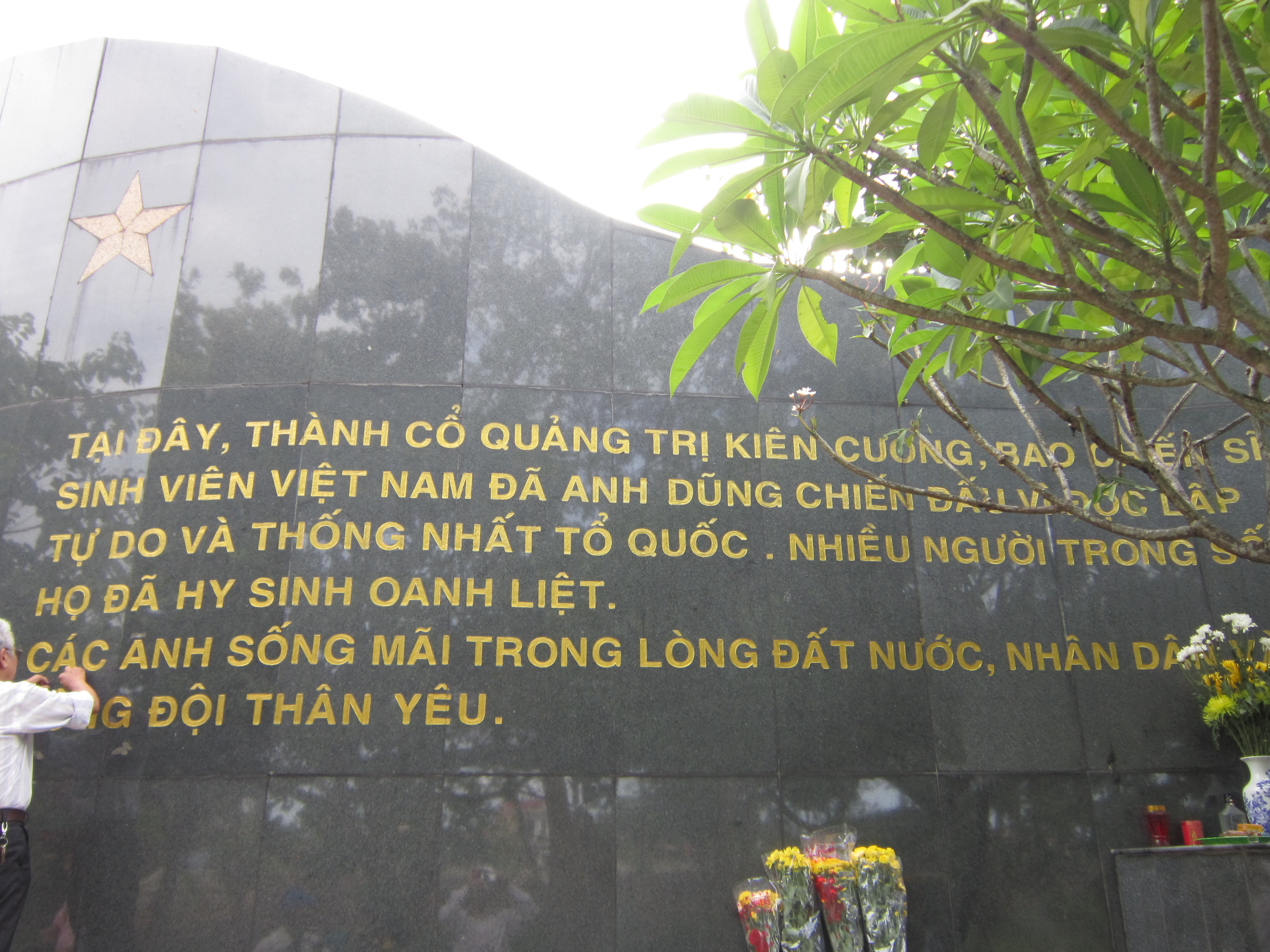
Monument commemorating Student-soldiers of Quang Tri Citadel. Many university students suspended their education to volunteer for the PAVN

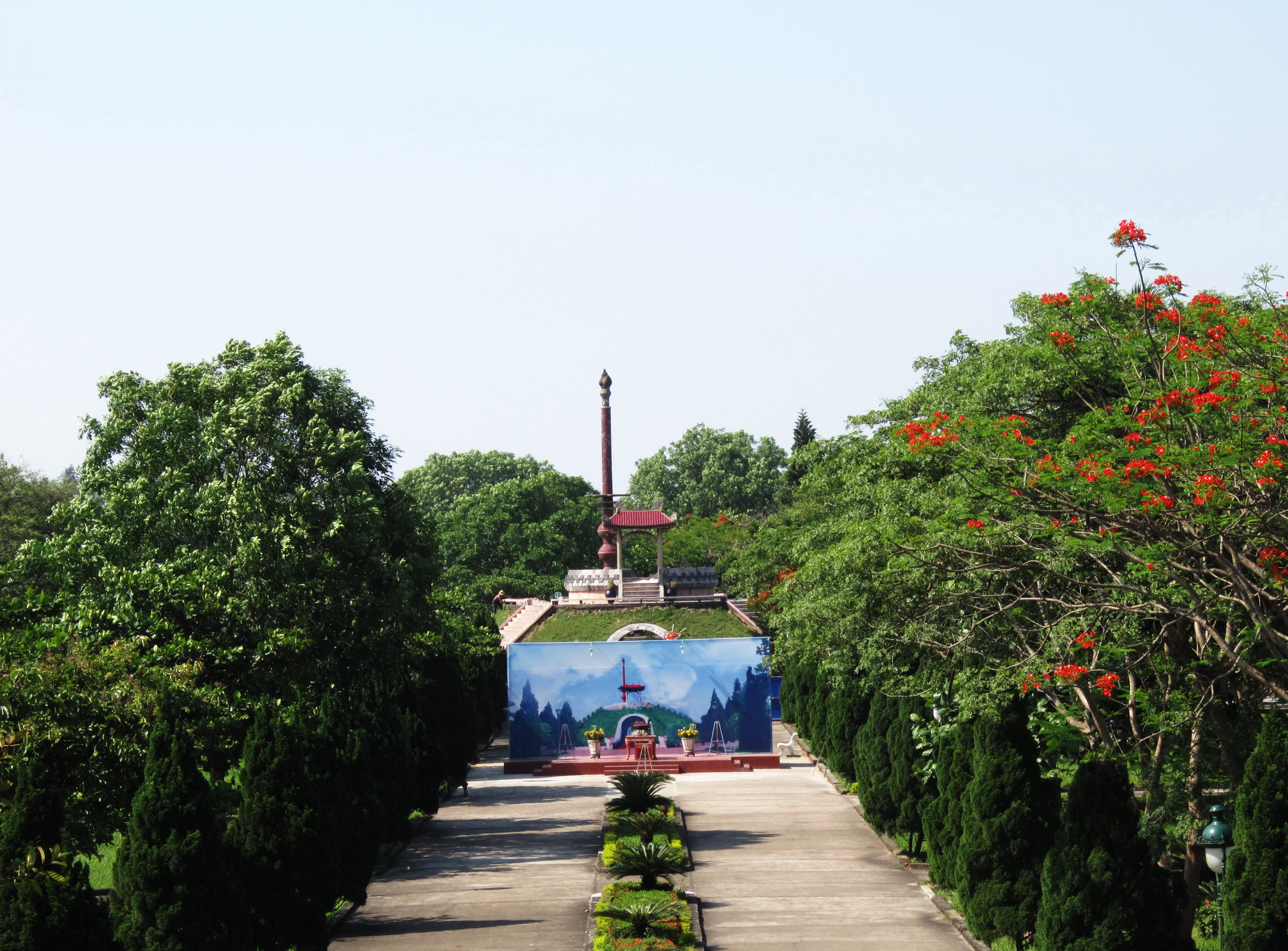
Main walkway in the citadel

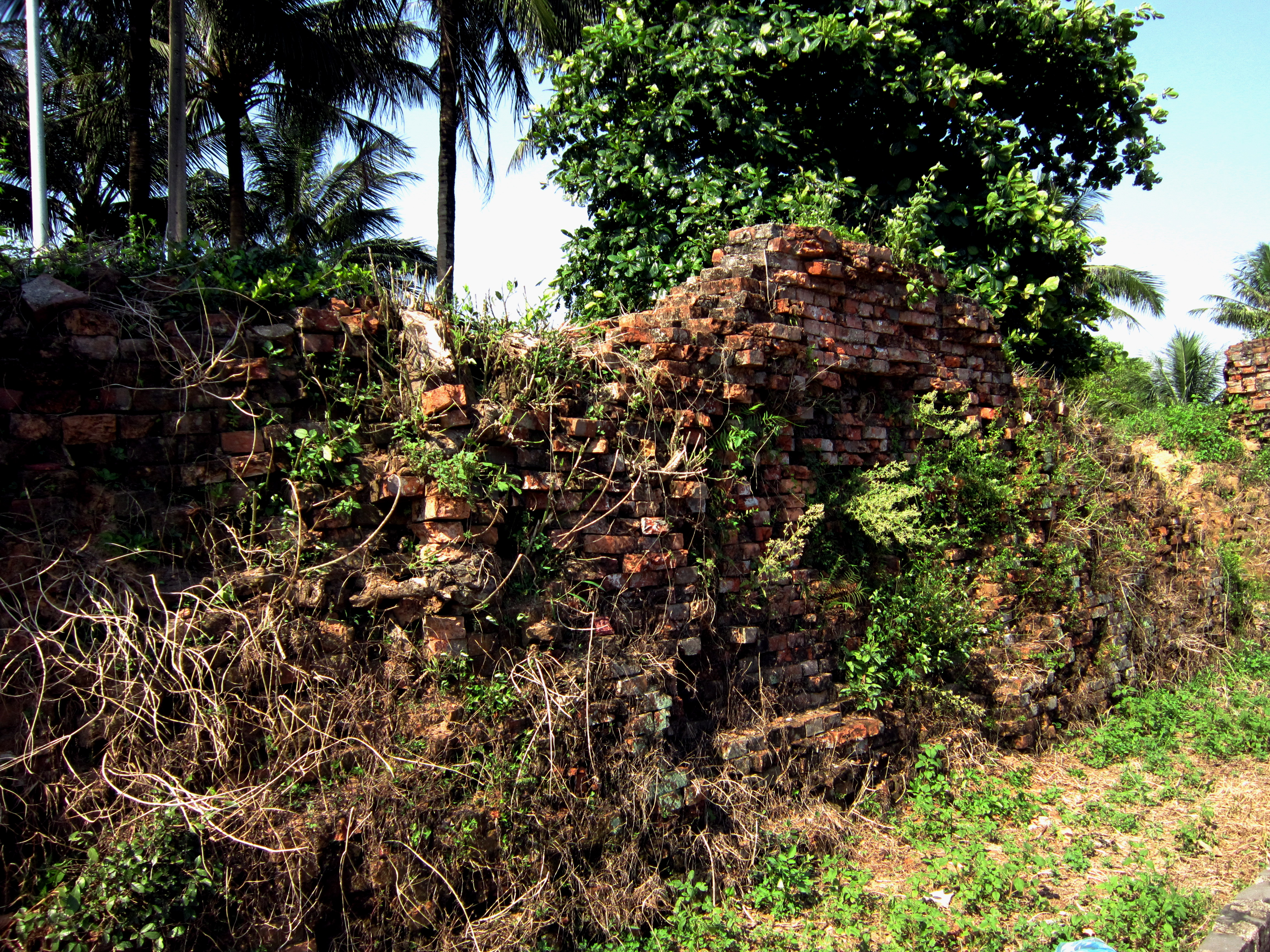
Old wall segment of the citadel
