= Mai (2024 film) =

MɅI
- The cinema poster of the film
- Directed by: Trấn Thành
- Screenplay by: Nguyễn Thanh Bình
- Produced by: Nguyễn Hữu Tường Vi; Trấn Thành; Nguyễn Phương Thảo
- Starring: Phương Anh Đào; Tuấn Trần; Trấn Thành; Ngọc Giàu; Khả Như; Uyển Ân; Anh Đức; Việt Anh; Hồng Đào
- Cinematography: Diệp Thế Vinh
- Music by: Nguyễn Hoàng Anh
- Production companies: Trấn Thành Town; CJ ENM; HKFilm
- Distributed by: CJ CGV
- Release date: February 10, 2024
- Running time: 131 minutes
- Country: Vietnam
- Language: Tiếng Việt
- Budget: 50 billion VND
- Box office: 551.2 billion VND

Mai (stylized as: MɅI) is a 2024 Vietnamese romantic drama film directed by Tran Thanh. By March 1, 2024, after 20 days of release, the film officially grossed over 500 billion VND, becoming the highest-grossing film in Vietnamese box office history. The film also helped Tran Thanh become the first and only director in Vietnam to have a total revenue of over 1,000 billion VND after Bo Gia, Nha Ba Nu, and Mai.

== Production ==
=== Development ===
The film was invested by Tran Thanh with a budget of 50 billion VND, 2 years of conceptualization and scriptwriting, and 1 year of production.

Initially, the role of Mai's father was assigned by Tran Thanh to People's Artist Viet Anh, however, he later decided to take on this antagonistic role. According to him, due to pressure from the production team and his inability to play the role of Uncle Ut, he had to give the role of Uncle Ut to People's Artist Viet Anh, while he took on the role of Mai's father. Regarding rumors about casting actors based on familiarity, director Tran Thanh also affirmed: "I never cast someone just because they know me but are not suitable for the role in the film. I never do that."

=== Filming ===
The film was shot over 47 non-consecutive days, from April 30 to July 15, 2023. According to Tuan Tran, the second intimate scene in the film between him and Phuong Anh Dao had to be filmed over 4 days due to issues with lighting or angles, as per the opinions of Tran Thanh and Diep The Vinh. He also shared that this was the first project where he played a role with an intimate scene. For the scenes at the 122 An Binh apartment complex, it was initially thought that filming would last up to a month. However, after surveying the location, the film crew only shot there for 7 days before moving to a film studio in Go Vap to shoot other scenes.

=== Music ===
No.	Title	Writer(s)	Performed by	Length
1.	"Sau lời từ khước"	Phan Mạnh Quỳnh	Phan Mạnh Quỳnh	4:11
2.	"Những con sông ngón tay"	Trần Đức Minh and Phan Lê Hà	Trần Thu Hà	5:25
3.	"Đen đá không đường"	LyLy	Amee	3:00
4.	"Bartender"	Ngọt	Ngọt	5:18
5.	"Mùa thu mây ngàn"	Từ Công Phụng	Từ Công Phụng	4:59
Total length:				22:53

The song "Sau lời từ khước" by Phan Mạnh Quỳnh even became the number 1 trending music on YouTube Vietnam. At the same time, the song also topped other digital music platforms such as iTunes, Apple Music, NCT Realtime, and Zing MP3.

== Release ==
=== Promotion ===
On November 28, 2023, Trấn Thành and the distribution company officially announced the film Mai and set the release date for February 10, 2024, the first day of Lunar New Year. The first look and teaser poster of the film were released, featuring actress Phương Anh Đào in the lead female role. On January 10, 2024, the distributor officially launched the trailer and official poster, revealing the full story of the love between the characters Mai and Dương. On February 20, after more than a week of screening, the film crew released a sad poster in line with the theme of the movie for the first time. The character Mai is depicted crying, with burdens symbolized by figures on her head that represent the weight of her fate. According to Trấn Thành, "Mai is a realistic perspective on life."

Releasing on the first day of Lunar New Year in 2024, the film faced competition from director Nhất Trung's movie Gặp lại chị bầu. Additionally, two other Vietnamese films were released during this period: Sáng đèn—a film about cải lương by director Hoàng Tuấn Cường, and Trà by director Lê Hoàng. However, both films were withdrawn from theaters on February 11 and February 14, respectively. This marked the first time in 10 years that two Vietnamese New Year films were pulled from theaters just days after their release. Many speculated that the reason was "fear" and "pressure" from Trấn Thành's film Mai.

On May 17, 2024, the film was officially released on the Galaxy Play and Netflix platforms.

== Reception ==
=== Box office ===
By the morning of February 13, the film had reached 100 billion VND, breaking the record of Nhà bà Nữ—the highest-grossing film in Vietnamese box office history—after just 3 days and one morning. By the eighth day since its release, the film had grossed 300 billion VND, continuing to break the previous record set by Nhà bà Nữ, also directed by Trấn Thành. On average, the film earned an additional 37.5 billion VND per day—an unprecedented figure in the history of the Vietnamese box office. According to VTC News, Mai became the fastest-grossing film in Vietnamese history. On Valentine's Day alone, the film earned 44 billion VND with 4,330 screenings, accounting for 68% of the total box office revenue in Vietnam for that day.

Since Mai surpassed the 200 billion VND mark, Trấn Thành has officially become the first director in Vietnam to achieve a total box office revenue of over one trillion VND from his films, including Bố già with 427 billion VND and Nhà bà Nữ with 475 billion VND. By the morning of February 18, the film surpassed the 300 billion VND mark, becoming the fastest film in Vietnamese box office history to reach this milestone. By March 1, 2024, after 20 days of release, the film officially surpassed 500 billion VND, overtaking Nhà bà Nữ to become the highest-grossing film in Vietnamese box office history. The combined box office revenue from Trấn Thành's three directed films—Bố già, Nhà bà Nữ, and Mai—is almost equal to the total annual box office revenue in Vietnam for the year 2023.

=== Impact and influence ===
During its screening period, many dialogues from the film also spread across social media platforms such as "Life’s too short," "Even the cleanest blanket has dust," "I want to love. I'm almost 40 years old,"... Especially, the line "Thank you for not waiting for me" has been reenacted and shared widely on TikTok. In total, there have been over 48,000 posts and 1.1 billion views related to the film "Mai" on the TikTok platform. Many debates about the film's ending also sparked lively discussions on social media. According to Deadline Hollywood, journalist Liz Shackleton noted that Vietnam had the most fierce competition in cinema during the 2024 Lunar New Year, making it the fastest recovering film market in Asia after India.

After its release, the main setting of the film, an old apartment building where many Chinese residents live on An Binh – Tran Hung Dao Street in District 5, Ho Chi Minh City, became a popular spot for people to take photos. Additionally, a noodle soup shop in District 5, featured in the film, suddenly gained fame and had to close early at 8 PM instead of 3 AM the next day due to running out of ingredients to serve.

=== Awards ===
Year	Award	Category	Nominee	Result	Reference
2024	2nd Da Nang Asian Film Festival	Best Film - Vietnamese In-competition Films	Mai	Won	
2024	2nd Da Nang Asian Film Festival	Best Director - Vietnamese In-competition Films	Trấn Thành	Won	
2024	2nd Da Nang Asian Film Festival	Best Lead Actress - Vietnamese In-competition Films	Phương Anh Đào	Won	

== Controversy ==
=== Film poster plagiarism ===
On January 4, 2024, images of the film's poster circulated on social media, coincidentally matching the cover of the book "Hen Nhau O Mot Cuoc Doi Khac" (Meet Me in Another Life).

=== Censorship for audiences under 18 years old ===
On February 21, 2024, many newspapers reported and condemned the issue of the movie "Mai" by Tran Thanh being labeled 18+ but still having students under 18 years old watching it. Mr. Le Thanh Liem - Chief Inspector of the Ministry of Culture, Sports and Tourism said that cinemas must comply with regulations, must ensure the age of moviegoers is in accordance with the label. With the movie "Mai", when labeled C18, high school students are not allowed to watch. Mr. Liem also said that when inspecting if there are such violations, the Ministry of Culture, Sports and Tourism inspector will handle it. The form of handling is specified in the regulations for distributing films in cinemas and distributing films on cyberspace. By the morning of March 1, the Chief Inspector of the Department of Culture, Sports and Tourism of Ho Chi Minh City confirmed that four cinemas in the area were administratively fined from 60 to 80 million VND for allowing students to watch the movie "Mai".
