= List of Vietnamese films =

A list of films (phim điện ảnh) produced in Vietnam.

== By year ==
=== 1920s ===
Title	Director	Cast	Genre	Notes
1923
Kim Vân Kiều			Silent Feature	
1924
Một đồng kẽm tậu được ngựa (A Penny for a Horse)			Silent Feature	
1925
Toufou		Léon Chang		
1927
The legend of madam De	Georges Specht			

=== 1930s ===
Title	Director	Cast	Genre	Notes
1937
Trọn với tình (True to Love)				
Cánh đồng ma (The Ghost Field)				Made in Hong Kong with Vietnamese actors and dialogue
1938
Trận phong ba (The Storm)				Made in Hong Kong with Vietnamese actors and dialogue
Late 1930s
Khúc khải hoàn (The Song of Triumph)				
Toét sợ ma (Toét Is Scared of Ghosts)				
Một buổi chiều trên sông Cửu Long (An Evening on the Mekong River)				
Thầy Pháp râu đỏ (The Red-Bearded Sorcerer)				

=== 1940s ===
Title	Director	Cast	Genre	Notes
1948
Trận Mộc Hóa (Moc Hoa Battle)			Documentary	

=== 1950s ===
Title	Director	Cast	Genre	Notes
1950
Trận Đông Khê (Dong Khe Battle)			Documentary	
1952
Chiến thắng Tây Bắc (Northwest Victory)			Documentary	
1953
Kiếp Hoa (Life of a Flower)	Doãn Hải Thanh	Kim Chung, Kim Xuân, Trần Quang Tứ	Romance / Melodrama	The first Vietnamese feature film with synchronized voice and sound produced in the North. Funded and produced by the Kim Chung Theatre Company, with interior scenes filmed in Hong Kong.
Việt Nam trên đường thắng lợi (Việt Nam on the Road to Victory)			Documentary	
1954
Điện Biên Phủ (Dien Bien Phu)			Documentary	
1956
Chúng tôi muốn sống (We Want To Live)	Vĩnh Noãn, Manuel Conde	Lê Quỳnh, Mai Trâm, Nguyễn Long Cương, Nguyễn Đức Tạo	Feature Film	Produced in South Vietnam and were screened to the public for free circa 1956
1958
The Quiet American	Joseph L. Mankiewicz	Audie Murphy, Michael Redgrave, Giorgia Moll	English Feature Film	This was the first American feature film shot in Vietnam and was considered by some to be an American propaganda film
1959
Chung một giòng sông (Together on the Same River)	Nguyễn Hồng Nghị		Feature Film	The first feature film produced in the Democratic Republic of Vietnam (North Vietnam) after Vietnam was split into two countries in 1954
Nước về Bắc Hưng Hải (Water Returns to Bac Hung Hai)	Bùi Đình Hạc		Documentary	Winner of the Golden Award at the 1959 Moscow Film Festival

=== 1960s ===
Title	Director	Cast	Genre	Notes
1960
Đáng đời Thằng Cáo (A Just Punishment for the Fox)	Lê Minh Hiền and Trương Qua		Animation	
1962
Con chim vành khuyên (The Fledgling)	Nguyễn Văn Thông, Trần Vũ	Tố Uyên, Thúy Vinh, Tư Bửu, Ngọc Lan		
1963
Chị Tư Hậu (Sister Tu Hau)	Phạm Kỳ Nam	Trà Giang	Feature Film	Winner of the Silver Award at the 1963 Moscow Film Festival
1964
A Yank in Viet-Nam (Year of the Tiger)	Marshall Thompson	Marshall Thompson, Kiều Chinh, Mario Barri, Enrique Magalona	English Feature Film	It was filmed entirely in South Vietnam during the Vietnam War
1965
Le ciel, la terre (The Sky, The Earth)	Joris Ivens		Documentary Short	The 27-minute documentary attempted to make a film that joins North and South Vietnam, showing multiple perspectives
1966
Nguyễn Văn Trỗi (The Nguyen Van Troi Story)	Bùi Đình Hạc, Lý Thái Bảo	Quang Tùng, Thu Hiền, Phi Nga, Tuệ Minh	Docudrama	
Nổi gió (Rising Storm)	Huy Thành	Thụy Vân, Thế Anh, Văn Hòa, Lâm Tới	Feature Film	
1967
Du kích Củ Chi (Củ Chi Guerillas)			Documentary	
1969
Đường ra phía trước (The Road to the Front)			Docudrama	

=== 1970s ===
Title	Director	Cast	Genre	Notes
1970
Lũy thép Vĩnh Linh (Vinh Linh Steel Rampart)			Documentary	
Nàng (She)	Lê Mộng Hoàng	Thẩm Thúy Hằng, La Thoại Tân, Xuân Dung, Trần Quang, Việt Hùng	Feature Film	
1971
Ðất khổ (Land of Sorrows)	Hà Thúc Can	Trịnh Công Sơn, Kim Cương, Sơn Nam, Kiên Giang, Miên Ðức Thắng	Feature Film	Trịnh Công Sơn (1939-2001), Vietnamese anti-war songwriter and posthumous recipient of the 2004 World Peace Music Awards, starred in this full-length dramatic feature film
Đường về quê mẹ (Road Back to the Motherland)	Bùi Đình Hạc	Trúc Quỳnh, Lâm Tới, Thế Anh	Feature Film	
Như hạt mưa sa (Like the Falling Raindrops)	Bùi Sơn Duân	Thẩm Thúy Hằng, Trần Quang, Bạch Tuyết, Cao Huỳnh, Đoàn Châu Mậu	Feature Film	
Những người săn thú trên núi Dak-sao (Hunters on Dak-sao Mountain)			Docudrama	
Truyện vợ chồng Anh Lực (The Story of Anh Lực and His Wife)	Vu Tran		Feature Film	
1972
Bão tình (Stormy Love)	Lưu Bạch Ðàn	Kiều Chinh, Ôn Văn Tài, Hùng Cường, Kiều Phượng Loan, Thúy Liệu	Feature Film	
Nắng chiều (Afternoon Sun)	Lý Đức Thư	Thanh Nga, Hùng Cường, Phương Hồng Ngọc, Tùng Lâm	Feature Film	
Người cô đơn (A Lonely Person)	Hoàng Thi Thơ	Vân Hùng, Thanh Nga, Thảo Sương, Túy Hoa	Feature Film	
Người tình không chân dung (The Faceless Lover)	Hoàng Vinh Lộc	Kiều Chinh, Tâm Phan, Vũ Xuân Thông, Bảo Ân, Trần Quang, Hùng Cường	Feature Film	
Như giọt sương khuya (Like the Midnight Dew)	Nguyễn Văn Qúi, Đình Mưu	Trần Quang, Bạch Tuyết, Vỹ Hiếu, Trọng Uyên	Feature Film	
Sóng tình (Love Waves)	Ðinh Xuân Hoà	Thẩm Thúy Hằng, Wen Tao, Thanh Thanh Tâm, Bạch Lan Thanh	Feature Film	
1973
Chiếc bóng bên đường (A Silhouette by the Road)	Nguyễn Văn Tường	Kiều Chinh, Kim Cương, Thành Được, Vũ Thành An, Thanh Việt	Feature Film	
Triệu phú bất đắc dĩ (The Reluctant Millionaire)	Lê Hoàng Hoa	Thanh Nga, Thanh Việt, Ngọc Tuyết	Comedy	
Trường tôi (My School)	Lê Dân	Thanh Lan, Khả Năng, Tùng Lâm, Thanh Hoài, Thanh Việt, Xuân Phát	Feature Film	
Tứ quái Sài Gòn (The Four Eccentrics of Saigon)	La Thoại Tân	Thẩm Thúy Hằng, Kim Cương, La Thoại Tân, Thanh Việt, Khả Năng, Tùng Lâm	Feature Film	
Vĩ tuyến 17 ngày và đêm (17th Parallel, Days and Nights)	Hải Ninh	Trà Giang, Lâm Tới, Ðoàn Dũng	Feature Film	8th Moscow International Film Festival for Best Actress 1973
1974
5 vua hề về làng (5 Comedian Kings Return to the Village)	Lê Dân, Lê Hoàng Hoa, Lê Mộng Hoàng, Quốc Hưng, Thân Trọng Kỳ	Thành Được, La Thoại Tân, Thanh Nga, Thẩm Thúy Hằng, Thanh Việt	Comedy	The film was released during the Lunar New Year in February 1974 in South Vietnam with Chinese, English and French subtitles
1975
Dưới hai màu áo (Under Two Shirt Colors)	Hoàng Dũng	Kim Cương, Ngọc Đức, Túy Hoa, Phương Khanh, Ngọc Đan Thanh	Feature Film	
Em bé Hà Nội (Child from Hanoi)	Hải Ninh		Feature Film	Entered into the 9th Moscow International Film Festival
Giỡn mặt tử thần (Flirting with the Grim Reaper)	Đỗ Tiến Đức	Thẩm Thúy Hằng, Bảo Ân, Ngọc Đức, Hoàng Mai	Horror	The film was never screened in theaters as it was completed in 1975 shortly before the fall of South Vietnam
Sao tháng tám (The August Star)	Trần Đắc	Thanh Tú, Đức Hoàn, Dũng Nhi, Trần Phương	Feature Film	
1977
Bài học ru hò đời (The Lesson that Serenades Life)	Huế Châu	Hoa Vân, Dâu Ngọc, Hiền Thu		
Chuyến xe bão táp (The Storm Rides)	Trần Vũ	Vũ Ðình Thân, Vũ Thanh Quý, Trịnh Thịnh, Mai Châu		
Mối tình đầu (First Love)	Hải Ninh	Thế Anh, Trà Giang, Như Quỳnh, Hồng Liên		
Lá sầu riêng (The Durian Leaf)	Hoàng Dũng, Bội Ngọc	Kim Cương, Văn Hùng, Ngọc Đức, Anh Thu, Ngọc Đan Thanh		
1978
Chom và Sa (Chom and Sa)	Phạm Kỳ Nam	Vũ Vân Dung, Nguyễn Kiên Cường, Lê Vân, Nguyễn Ðăng Khoa	Feature Film	Winner of the Silver Elephant - 1st International Children Film Festival - Mumbai, India
Mùa gió chướng (Season of the Whirlwind)	Hong Sen Nguyen		Feature Film	
1979
Cánh đồng hoang (The Abandoned Field: Free Fire Zone)	Nguyễn Hồng Sến	Lâm Tới, Thúy An		Winner of the Golden Prize at the 12th Moscow International Film Festival
Tự thú trường bình minh	Phạm Kỳ Nam	Lê Vân, Thế Anh, Trần Tiến, Văn Hòa, Trịnh Thịnh	Feature Film	

=== 1980s ===
Title	Director	Cast	Genre	Notes
1984
Bao giờ cho đến tháng mười (When The Tenth Month Comes)	Đặng Nhật Minh	Lê Vân, Nguyễn Hữu Mười, Nguyễn Minh Vượng, Lại Phú Cường, Trịnh Phong	Feature Film	
Đàn chim trở về (The Flock of Birds Return)	Anh Thai Nguyen, Khanh Du Nguyen		Feature Film	
1985
Biệt Ðộng Sài Gòn (Saigon Commandos)	Long Vân	Quang Thái, Hà Xuyên, Thanh Loan, Thương Tín, Thúy An, Bùi Cường	Feature Film	
1986
Noi binh chim hot				
1987
Cô gái trên sông (Girl on the River)				
Ngoại ô (The Outskirts)	Lê Văn Duy	Thanh Lan, Bắc Sơn, Lê Cung Bắc, Thế Anh Xem	Feature Film	

=== 1990s ===
Title	Director	Cast	Genre	Notes
1990
The Cu Chi Tunnels				
1991
Canh bac				
1992
L'Amant (The Lover)	Jean-Jacques Annaud	Tony Leung Ka Fai; Jane March		nominated for the 1992 Academy Award for Best Cinematography won the Motion Picture Sound Editors's 1993 Golden Reel award for "Best Sound Editing — Foreign Feature"; 1993 César Award for Best Music Written for a Film
1993
Mùi đu đủ xanh (The Scent of Green Papaya)	Trần Anh Hùng			Official Vietnamese entry for the 66th Academy Awards, nominated for top 5, won at Cannes
1995
Le Couteau				
Xích lô (Cyclo)	Trần Anh Hùng			
1996
Gone, Gone Forever Gone	Hồ Quang Minh			
1998
Ai xuôi vạn lý (The Long Journey)				
The Eleventh Child (Nguol thùa)	Dai Sijie			
1999
Chung cu	Việt Linh			Entered into the 21st Moscow International Film Festival
Crow and the Peacock				
Đời Cát (Sandy Lives)	Nguyen Thanh Van			
Ba mùa (Three Seasons)	Tony Bùi			American coproduction, Official Vietnamese entry for the 72nd Academy Awards, entered into Berlin

=== 2000s ===
Title	Director	Cast	Genre	Notes
2000
Bến không chồng (Wharf of Widows)	Lưu Trọng Ninh	Thúy Hà, Lưu Trọng Ninh, Như Quỳnh, Minh Châu	Feature Film	
Thở vào thở ra (Breathe In, Breathe Out)				
Chiếc chìa khóa vàng (The Golden Key)				
Course de nuit (Cuộc xe đêm)				
Cua roi				
Mùa hè chiều thẳng đứng (The Vertical Ray of the Sun)	Trần Anh Hùng	Trần Nữ Yến Khê, Nguyễn Như Quỳnh, Lê Khanh, Ngô Quang Hải	Feature Film	Screened at the 2000 Cannes Film Festival
2003
Buổi sáng đầu năm (First Morning)	Victor Vũ		Feature Film	
2004
Oan hồn (Spirits)	Victor Vũ	Catherine Ái, Tuấn Cường, Kathleen Lương, Kathy Uyên	Horror	
Ngày giỗ (The Anniversary)	Ham Trần	Don Dương, Ngô Thái Uyên, Jayvee Hiep Mai, Ngọc Lâm	Short Documentary	
The Beautiful Country	Hans Petter Molano	Nick Nolte, Tim Roth, Bai Ling, Temuera Morrison, Damien Nguyễn	Feature Film	Set in 1990
Khi đàn ông có bầu (When Men Get Pregnant)	Phạm Hoàng Nam	Nguyễn Phi Hùng, Kim Thư, Việt Anh, Hồng Nga, Bảo Quốc	Comedy	
Mùa len trâu (The Buffalo Boy)	Nguyễn-Võ Nghiêm-Minh	Antony Bert, Lê Thế Lữ, Nguyễn Thị Kiều Trinh, Nguyễn Hữu Thanh	Feature Film	Official Vietnamese entry for the 78th Academy Awards
Nữ tướng cướp			Crime-drama	
2005
1735 Km				
Saigon Love Story	Ringo Lê			
2006
Hồn Trương Ba, da hàng thịt (Truong Ba's Soul, Butcher's Body)	Nguyễn Quang Dũng	Johnny Trí Nguyễn, Phước Sang	Comedy	
Áo lụa Hà Ðông (The White Silk Dress)	Lưu Huỳnh	Trương Ngọc Ánh, Nguyễn Quốc Khánh, Hà Kiều Anh, Thủy Hương		Official Vietnamese entry for the 80th Academy Awards
2007
Bolinao 52	Ðức H. Nguyễn		Documentary	
Vượt sóng (Journey from the Fall)	Ham Trần	KiềuChinh, Diểm Liên, Long Nguyễn, Cát Ly	Feature Film	Screened at the 2006 Sundance Film Festival
Mười: The Legend of a Portrait	Kim Tae-kyeong	Anh Thu	Horror	This is the first horror film produced in Vietnam after the Fall of Saigon (with the collaboration of Korean producers), and is the first film to be rated with an under-16 ban
My Little World	Mike Nguyễn		Animation	
Oh, Saigon	Doan Hoàng		Documentary	
Cú và chim se sẻ (Owl and the Sparrow)	Stephane Gauger	Phạm Thị Hân, Cát Ly, Lê Thế Lữ	Feature Film	
Saigon Eclipse	Othello Khanh	Johnny Trí Nguyễn, Dustin Nguyễn, Marjolaine Bùi	Drama	Two versions: A Vietnamese and an English version were produced (Not dubbed)
Night in Abandoned House	Nguyễn Khánh	Huỳnh Thi, Monalisa Nguyễn, Ngọc Ðan Thanh	Horror, Thriller	
Giòng máu anh hùng (The Rebel)	Charlie Nguyen	Johnny Tri Nguyen, Veronica Ngo, Dustin Nguyen	Martial arts film	
2008
Nụ hôn thần chết (Kiss of Death)	Nguyễn Quang Dũng	Johnny Trí Nguyễn, Thanh Hằng, Hoài Linh, Thành Lộc, Phương Thanh	Comedy	
2009
Giải cứu thần chết (Saving Death)	Nguyễn Quang Dũng	Minh Hằng, Chí Thiện, Saetti Baggio, Đông Nhi	Comedy	
14 ngày phép (14 Days)	Nguyễn Trọng Khoa	Thái Hòa, Ngọc Lan, Trịnh Hội, Bình Minh, Ngọc Quyên	Romantic Comedy	
Chuyện tình xa xứ (Passport to Love)	Victor Vũ	Bình Minh, Huy Khanh, Kathy Uyên, Ngọc Ðiệp		
Đẹp từng centimét (Beautiful Every Centimeter)	Vũ Ngọc Đãng	Lương Mạnh Hải, Tang Thanh Hà	Romantic Comedy	
Chơi vơi (Adrift)	Bùi Thac Chuyen	Linh Dan Pham, Đo Thi Hai Yen, Johnny Trí Nguyễn		
Huyền thoại bất tử (The Legend is Alive)	Lưu Huỳnh	Dustin Nguyễn	Martial Arts Action	
Bẫy rồng (Clash)	Lê Thanh Sơn	Johnny Trí Nguyễn, Ngô Thanh Vân	Martial Arts Action	

=== 2010s ===
Title	Director	Cast	Genre	Notes
2010
Fool for Love (Để mai tính)	Charlie Nguyễn	Dustin Nguyễn, Kathy Uyên, Thái Hòa	Romantic Comedy	
The Floating Lives (Cánh đồng bất tận)	Nguyễn Phan Quãng Bình	Dustin Nguyễn, Đỗ Hải Yến, Tang Thanh Hà	Drama	
The Princess and the Five Brave Generals (Công chúa teen và ngũ hổ tướng)	Lê Lọc	Bảo Thy, Hoài Linh, Chí Tài, Tấn Bèo, Hiếu Hiền, Manh Trang	Romantic Teen Comedy	
When Asked Not to Turn Around (Khi yêu đừng quay đầu lại)	Nguyễn Võ Nghiêm Minh	Ngân Khánh, Thanh Thuc, Thanh Lọc, Mỹ Duyên	Thriller, Suspense	
The Musician at the Dragon Citadel (Long-thành cầm-giả ca)	Bá Son Dào	Kim Anh Nhat, Quach Ngoc Ngoan, Luc Tran	Drama	Winner of the 201 Golden Kite Prize
Touch (Chạm) Minh Đức Nguyễn	Porter Lynn, John Ruby, Melinda Bennett, Tony LaThanh, Long Nguyễn	Drama		
2011
Cô dâu đại chiến (Battle of the Brides)	Victor Vũ	Huy Khánh, Ngọc Điệp	Romantic Comedy	
Bóng ma học đường (Ghost School)	Lê Bảo Trung	Hoài Linh, Ngoc Điệp, Wanbi Tuấn Anh, Trương Quỳnh Anh, Elly Trần Hà	Horror	
Saigon Electric	Stephane Gauger	Van Trang, Quỳnh Hoa, Elly Trần Hà	Teen Romance	
Lệnh xóa số (Eliminating Order)	Suen Laap-Gei	Nguyễn Chanh Tin, Trần Kim Hoàng, Ngọc Điệp	Action Drama	
Long ruồi	Charlie Nguyễn	Thái Hòa	Comedy	
2012
Giữa hai thế giới (Between Two Worlds)	Vũ Thái Hòa	Ngọc Điệp, Dustin Nguyễn	Horror, Thriller	
The Girl with No Number	Michael Gleissner	Bebe Pham, Jay Laisne, Elina Madison, Lương Thế Thanh	Drama	
Ngọc viễn Đông (Pearls of the Far East)	Cường Ngô	Thanh Vân Ngô, Kiều Chinh, Lê Thái Hòa, Huy Khánh, Trương Ngọc Ánh	Drama, Romance	
Dành cho tháng 6 (Reserved for June)	Huu-Tuan Nguyễn		Sport, Romance	
In the Name of Love	Lưu Huỳnh			
2013
Mỹ nhân kế (The Lady Assassin)	Nguyễn Quang Dũng	Thanh Hằng, Tang Thanh Hà	Martial Arts Action	
Lửa phật (Once Upon a Time in Vietnam)	Dustin Nguyễn	Dustin Nguyễn, Roger Yuan, Thanh Vân Ngô, Jason Ninh Cao	Martial Arts Action, Fantasy	
Đường đua (The Race)	Nguyễn Khac Huy	Anh Khoa, Nhan Phúc Vinh	Action, Thriller	
2014
Battle of the Brides 2 (Cô dâu đại chiến 2)	Victor Vũ	Bình Minh, Lan Phương, Lê Khánh, Vân Trang, Maya	comedy	
Hollow	Ham Tran	Nguyễn Ngọc Hiệp	horror	
Năm sau con lại về	Trần Ngọc Giàu	Hoài Linh, Việt Anh, Thanh Thủy, Lê Khánh, Chí Tài	comedy	
Nước (2030)	Nguyễn Võ Nghiêm Minh	Quynh Hoa, Quy Binh, Kim Long Thach	drama	
Vengeful Heart (Quả tim máu)	Victor Vũ	Nhã Phương, Thái Hòa, Quý Bình		
Melodies of Life	Lien Mya Nguyen	Lien Mya Nguyen, Stephen Oost, Chris Rennirt	drama	
The Last Journey of Madam Phung	Nguyễn Thị Thắm		documentary	
The Scent of Fish Sauce	Trinh Dinh Le Minh	Gayland Williams, Dillon Cavitt, Tram Ly		
Xui mà hên	Ethan Tran	Ethan Tran, Hieu Hien	comedy	
Năm sau con thi lại nè (I Will Return Next Year)	mai thị họe	Hoài Linh, Việt Anh, Thanh Thủy, Quy Binh, Lê Khánh, Thanh Trúc	Comedy	
Let Hoi Decide	Charlie Nguyễn		Romantic Comedy	
2015
Big Father, Small Father and Other Stories	Dang Di Phan	Do Thi Hai Yen		
Jackpot	Dustin Nguyễn			
2016
Tracer	Cường Ngô, Trung Ly	Trương Ngọc Ánh, Thiên Nguyễn, Maria Trần, Cường Seven, Lamou Vissay, Hiếu Nguyễn, Vinh Thủy, Marcus G.		
Sweet 20	Phan Gia Nhat Linh	Miu Lê, Hua Vi Vân, Ngô Kiên Huy	Comedy	
Saigon, I Love You	Ly Minh Thang		Romantic comedy	
Father and Son	Lương Dinh Dung		Arthouse	
Zodiac 12: Five Steps of Love	Vũ Ngọc Phương	Vũ Phương Anh	Teen romance	
Sut		Hà Hiền	Sport drama	
2018
The Third Wife	Ash Mayfair			

=== 2020s ===
Title	Director	Cast	Genre	Notes
2022
The Girl from Dak Lak (Co gai den tu Dak Lak)	Pedro Roman			
2023
Live: Phat Truc Tiep	Khương Ngọc	Ngoc Phước, Quốc Khánh, Khả Như	Horror	
2024
Mai	Trấn Thành	Phương Anh Đào, Tuấn Trần,...	Romance film	
Before Sex: Trước giờ "Yêu"	Tùng Leo, Huỳnh Anh Duy, Michael Thái	Jun Vũ, Tôn Kinh Lâm, Đỗ Khánh Vân, Việt Hưng, Tùng, Khazsak, Vinh Râu	Pornographic film	
2025
The 4 Rascals	Trấn Thành	Trần Tiểu Vy, Trần Quốc Anh, Nguyễn Cao Kỳ Duyên, Lê Dương Bảo Lâm, Lê Giang, Uyển Ân,...	Comedy film	

== By genre ==
- List of Vietnamese animated films
- List of Vietnamese historical films

== See also ==
- List of Vietnamese submissions for the Academy Award for Best International Feature Film
- List of highest-grossing films in Vietnam
