= Five Bumpkins =

1975 film

Five Bumpkins Năm vua hề về làng
- Directed by: Lê Dân; Lê Hoàng Hoa; Lê Mộng Hoàng; Quốc Hưng; Thân Trọng Kỳ
- Screenplay by: Nguyễn Thành Châu
- Produced by: Lưu Trạch Hưng
- Starring: Thành Được; La Thoại Tân; Thanh Nga; Thẩm Thúy Hằng; Thanh Việt
- Cinematography: Trần Đình Mưu
- Edited by: Tăng Thiên Tài; Lưu Trạch Hưng
- Music by: Văn Phụng
- Production company: Mỹ Vân Films
- Distributed by: Mỹ Vân Films; Dư Hương Centre; Vietnam National Institute of Film
- Release date: 2 February 1975
- Running time: 95 minutes
- Country: Republic of Vietnam
- Language: Vietnamese

Five Bumpkins, also known as Five Clown-Kings Returns to the Village (Vietnamese: Năm vua hề về làng) or A Troupe Comes to the Village (Vietnamese: Gánh hát về làng), is a 1974 Vietnamese 35mm eastmancolor film by Mỹ Vân Films.

== Plot ==
- Story 1: Love of Life (Tình đời)
- Story 2: Changing Lanes (Đổi ngôi)
- Story 3: A Hero Fears the Water (Anh hùng sợ nước)
- Story 4: When Male Kidnapper Meets Female Kidnapper (Bố mìn gặp mẹ mìn)
- Story 5: Two Love Letters (Hai bức thư tình)

== Production ==
Location is Saigon, Xuân Lộc and Vũng Tàu in 1974.

=== Art ===
- Type: Comedy, adventure, feature.
- Studio: Mỹ Vân Films (Mỹ-Vân Điện-ảnh Công-ti)
- Print: National Cinema Centre (Trung-tâm Quốc-gia Điện-ảnh)
- Directors: Lê Dân (C. 1), Lê Hoàng Hoa (C. 2), Lê Mộng Hoàng (C. 3), Quốc Hưng (C. 4), Thân Trọng Kỳ (C. 5)
- Screenplay: Nguyễn Thành Châu (Năm Châu)

=== Cast ===
- Hồng Vân as the narrator
- Thành Được
- La Thoại Tân
- Lý Huỳnh
- Ngọc Tuyết
- Kim Ngọc
- Mỹ Chi
- Thanh Mai
- Thẩm Thúy Hằng
- Thanh Nga
- Túy Hoa
- Cẩm Hồng
- Vân Hùng
- Băng Châu
- Lệ Hoa
- Khả Năng
- Thanh Việt
- Kim Cương
- Ba Vân
- Xuân Phát
- Tùng Lâm
- Văn Chung
- Thanh Hoài
- Mỹ Chi
- Tài Lương
- Bảo Quốc
- Năm Châu

== Broadcast ==
The movie has been released in 1975 Lunar New Year with Chinese, English and French subtitles.

- (South Vietnam) 2 February 1975 : Photographic film.
- 2 February 1975 : Photographic film.
- (Taiwan) 2 February 1975 : Photographic film.
- (Australia) 2 February 2012 : Betacam and DVD.
- (United States) 2 February 2018 : Blu-ray.
- (Vietnam) 2 February 2018 : Blu-ray.

== See also ==
- Four Oddballs of Saigon
