= Vietnam Television Network =

Vietnam Television Channel 9
- Country: South Vietnam
- Broadcast area: South Vietnam, Cambodia
- Headquarters: 9 Hồng Thập Tự (Note: The street name means "Red Cross") Avenue, Saigon (now is 9 Nguyễn Thị Minh Khai, Bến Nghé Ward, District 1, Ho Chi Minh City)

Ownership
- Owner: Radio-Television Public Broadcasting Centre; National Government; Joint General Staff

History
- Launched: 7 February 1966
- Closed: 29 April 1975
- Replaced by: SGTV (May 1, 1975)

Availability

Terrestrial
- Over the air analog: Channel 9 (Note: Băng tần 9)

Vietnam Television (Vietnamese: Đài Truyền-hình Việtnam, abbreviated THVN), sometimes also unofficially known as the National Television (Đài Truyền-hình Quốc-gia), Saigon Television (Đài Truyền-hình Sàigòn) or Channel 9 (Đài số 9, THVN9), was the national television broadcaster of South Vietnam from February 7, 1966, until just before the Fall of Saigon on April 29, 1975. It was the first television broadcaster in Vietnam.

THVN9 was operated by the Vietnamese Bureau of Television (Nha Vô-tuyến Truyền-hình Việtnam), part of the General Department of Radio, Television, and Cinema (Tổng-cuộc Truyền-thanh Truyền-hình và Điện-ảnh) in the Ministry of Propaganda. Vietnam Television broadcast from the capital Saigon on channel 9 (4.5 MHz) in FCC-standard black and white. However, from 1972, all important events were broadcast in color as standard.

The other national broadcaster in South Vietnam was the English-language Armed Forces Vietnam Network (AFVN) or NWB-TV on channel 11. However, it was operated by the US military. Both channels used an airborne transmission relay system from airplanes flying at the high altitudes, called Stratovision, as part of Operation Blue Eagle. Besides Vietnam Television, South Vietnam also had four local television stations.

== History ==
Vietnam Television Station (THVN) was established in 1965; its first broadcast was on February 7, 1966, at 6:58 pm, and the last one was at 11:58 pm on April 29, 1975. The first broadcast recorded images of South Vietnamese Prime Minister Nguyễn Cao Kỳ and US ambassador to South Vietnam Cabot Lodge. Initially lasting for an hour, the duration was later increased to two hours. On October 25, 1966, THVN's first above-ground establishment was finished.

THVN was established at the same time as AFRTS (Armed Forces Radio Television Service), which was renamed as AFVN (Armed Forces Vietnam Network) in 1967. THVN broadcast on band 9, while AFVN on frequency band 11. AFVN broadcast the landing of Neil Armstrong on the Moon in 1969 for audiences in South Vietnam. By 1970, both THVN and AFVN had a network of five stations each.

Recording was first performed at the National Cinema Center No. 9 on Thi Sach Street. In 1967, THVN was split into 2 separate departments - Cinema and Television. THVN's headquarter was moved to 9 Hồng Thập Tự Avenue (now Nguyen Thi Minh Khai Street) - which later became the headquarter of the current Ho Chi Minh City Television.

American television started in Vietnam on January 22, 1966 with tests on two channels. On February seventh, regular transmissions commenced with American programming on channel 11 and Vietnamese broadcasts on channel 9.
No permanent studio had been built, so three C-121 Super Constellation aircraft, known as Blue Eagles, were specially outfitted with film projectors and transmitters. A fourth Blue Eagle was radio only. It was used to relay audio of the 1965 World Series. Circling high over South Vietnam and transmitting U.S. TV programs on Channel 11, the Blue Eagles provided extended coverage to Americans who were arriving in increasing numbers. Steve Robbins was an organizer of Project Jenny which led to the Blue Eagle flights. He has a wealth of photos and information on his web site.
Later in 1966, a permanent TV station was completed at 9 Hong Thap Tu in Saigon. A huge antenna provided more reliable coverage. Hours were expanded and daily newscasts began. Concurrently, several detachments added television. A complete station was mounted in a van the size of a large semi trailer. The mountaintop locations of some detachments provided excellent coverage.
But unlike radio, AFVN television programming could not be fed directly from the Saigon key station to detachments. Wideband technology still was primitive in the late '60s. Programs on videotape and film were rotated among detachments using a weekly film flight and postal mail. In Saigon, sign-on was around noon daily while most detachments started transmissions around 4PM on weekdays and at noon on Saturday and Sunday. Troops watched favorite stateside series such as Bonanza, Mission Impossible, Gunsmoke, Laugh-In and Hawaii Five-O. Tape-delayed NFL football games and the ever-popular Roller Derby were other highlights. A soldier could even watch the series Combat! on AFVN-TV. When Archie Bunker and All in the Family broke new ground, Archie's antics were seen weekly on AFVN-TV.
Television service continued until the American troop population dropped in 1971-72. Detachments were closed and AFVN-TV left the air in early 1973 as the Paris Peace Accords took effect. Most equipment and facilities were transferred to THVN, the South Vietnamese TV network.

— Billy Williams, Television in Vietnam, Popular Electronics magazine, April 1966 ）

Color filming units of THVN9 broadcasting a National Armed Forces Day parade, Saigon, 16 June 1971.

THVN9 broadcast the 1974 FIFA World Cup in West Germany with the playback of video recordings donated by the host country, a few days later than the actual match times. Historical events in early 1975 were also broadcast by Saigon Television. The chaotic and bloody evacuation from the Central Highlands to Tuy Hoa along Highway 7, dubbed as the "Convoy of Tears" was broadcast on television - causing more terror for the people in the South. This was followed by a live broadcast of the resignation speech of President Nguyễn Văn Thiệu on the evening of April 21, 1975.

On April 30, the TV crew of THVN9 went to the Independence Palace to broadcast for President Dương Văn Minh, but did not because around 7 am, Minh told everyone to leave. South Vietnam collapsed when Minh announced the surrender on national radio in the afternoon.

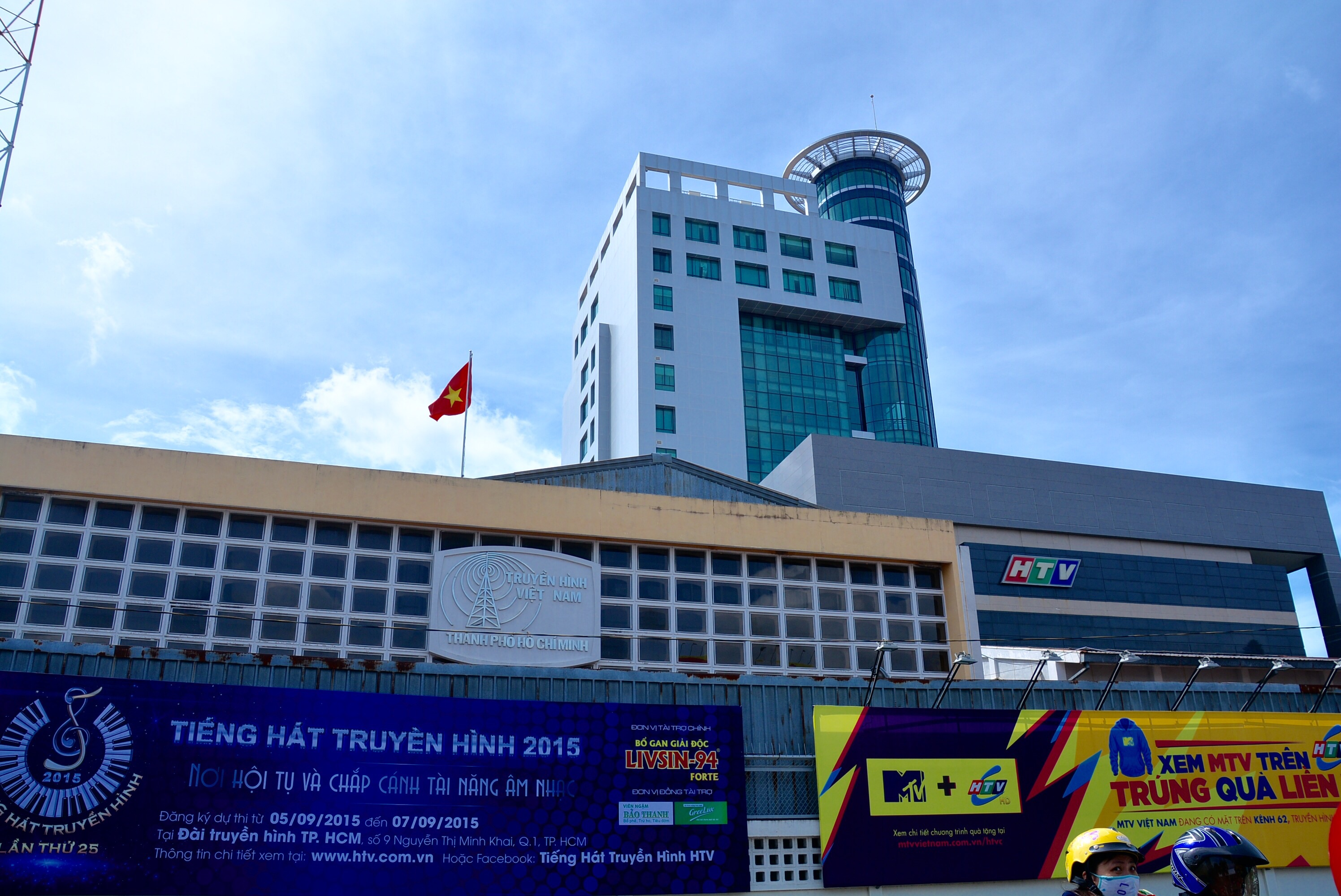
THVN's former building as seen in 2015, serving as Ho Chi Minh City Television headquarters.

The last broadcast of THVN9 was from 18:45 to 22:45 on April 29, 1975, the day before the Fall of Saigon. After the Fall of Saigon, THVN9 was handed over to the Viet Cong. Vietnam Television's final programming aired the evening of April 29, 1975.

At 15:45 on April 30, 1975, the group (or 12 comrades from Central Propaganda Department) entered and occupied the Saigon Television Station, taking over Saigon Television Station, the takeover team had to sleep in the hallway, not daring to enter the central area for fear of the enemy planting a bomb. After checking, all equipment and machinery of the station was still intact, so they reported to the Military Management Board and station leaders, who were ordered: "Try to carry out the broadcast on the night of May 1." However, the technical team is still very unfamiliar with the machinery and equipment of Saigon Television. Fortunately, that morning a few former employees came and they, along with the old staff and the crew, took over operating the machines, preparing well for a successful first broadcast night on May 1, 1975.

On that same day, the station was reconstituted as Saigon Liberation Television Station (Đài Truyền-hình Sài-gòn Giải-phóng, SGTV) with its first broadcast featuring the surrender declaration by President Minh the previous day.

On July 2, 1976, Saigon Liberation Television Station was renamed to Ho Chi Minh City Television (HTV).

== Governance and corporate structure ==
=== Board ===
- Executive committee : LC Đỗ Việt (first director), FD Đỗ Tiến Đức (second director), Lê Hoàng Hoa (first deputy director and executive producer)...
- Operational divisions : Hoàng Trọng (music producer), Hoàng Thái (camera operator), Robert C. Gassert (technical advisor), Wyndham P. Duncan (sound advisor), Hoàng Thị Lệ Hợp (newsreader), Mai Thy (newsreader), Tuyết Mai (newsreader), Mai Liên (newsreader), Nguyễn Đình Khánh (newsreader), Nguyễn Văn Đông, Nguyễn Thế Bảo, Trần Văn Trạch (MC), Ngọc Phu (MC)...
- Co-operators : Hoàng Thi Thơ, Hồ Điệp, Thẩm Thúy Hằng, La Thoại Tân, Kim Cương, Túy Hồng, Tùng Lâm, Khả Năng, Thanh Việt, Trần Thiện Thanh, Mai Lệ Huyền, Phạm Duy, Tâm Phan, Trần Quang, Hùng Cường, Bạch Tuyết, Trường Kỳ, Nam Lộc, Nguyễn Thành Châu, Phùng Há, Thanh Nga, Túy Hoa, Thành Được, Út Bạch Lan, Minh Vương, Lệ Thủy, Thanh Sang, Út Trà Ôn, Diệp Lang, Phượng Liên, Kiều Chinh, Dũng Thanh Lâm, Văn Chung, Thanh Lan, Thanh Tuyền, Chế Linh, Bạch Lan Hương, Tuyết Lan, Quốc Dũng, Kiểu Hạnh, Mộng Tuyền, Dũng Thanh Lâm, Huỳnh Thanh Trà, Phương Hồng Quế, Phương Hồng Hạnh, Phương Đại, Du Tử Lê, Khánh Ly, Trịnh Công Sơn...

=== Services ===
Ladies and gentlemen! This is Vietnam Television, broadcast on channel 9.

— Start

Ladies and gentlemen! Vietnam Television's broadcast has ended.
We usually try our best to improve in the fields of information, education and entertainment, so be content.
Goodbye and see you again tomorrow, also on channel 9 of our Network.

— Final

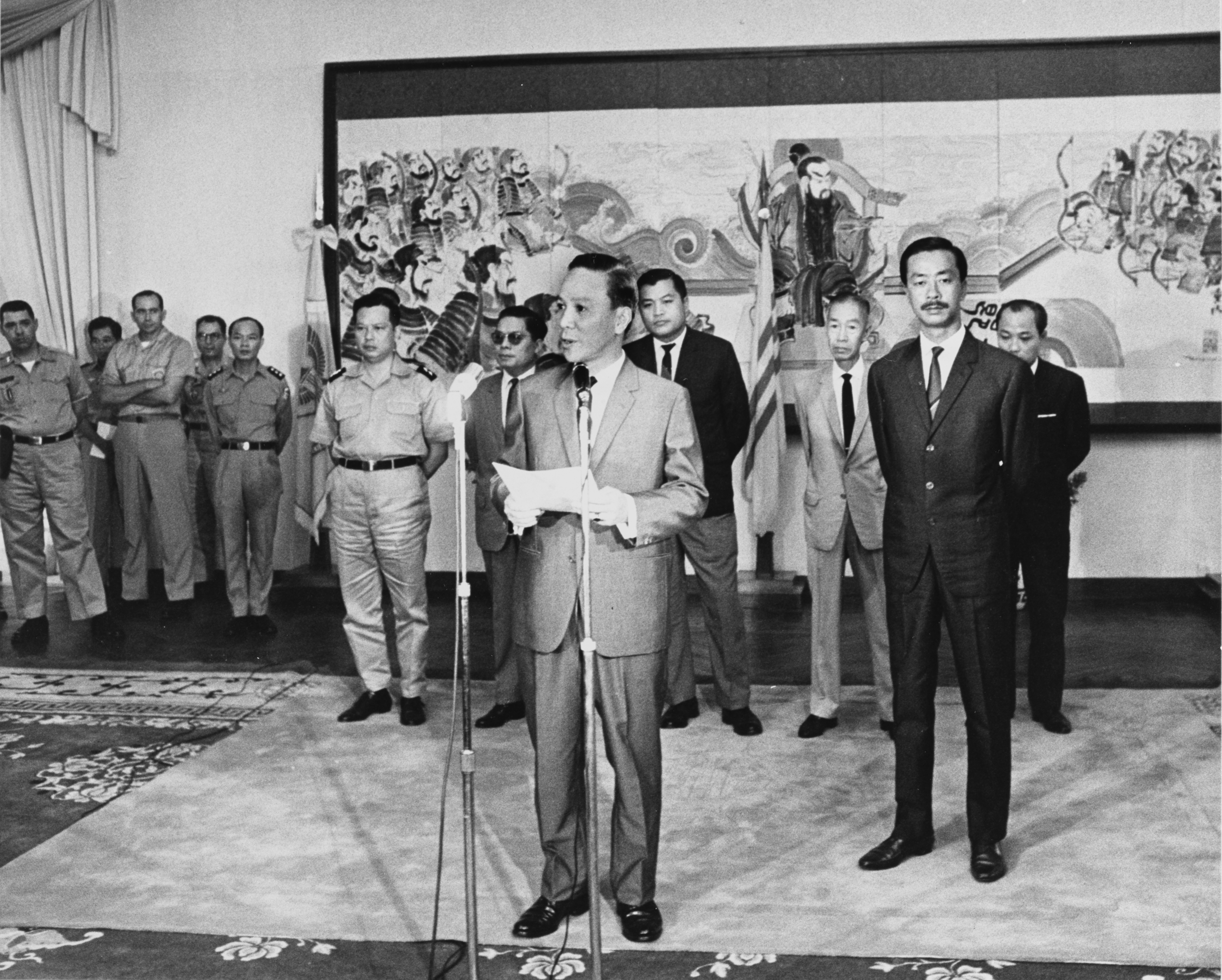
Lieutenant-General Nguyen Van Thieu at the microphone during a press conference on the eve of the national election, 2 September 1967. Prime Minister Nguyen Cao Ky is to right conference took place at Independence Palace.

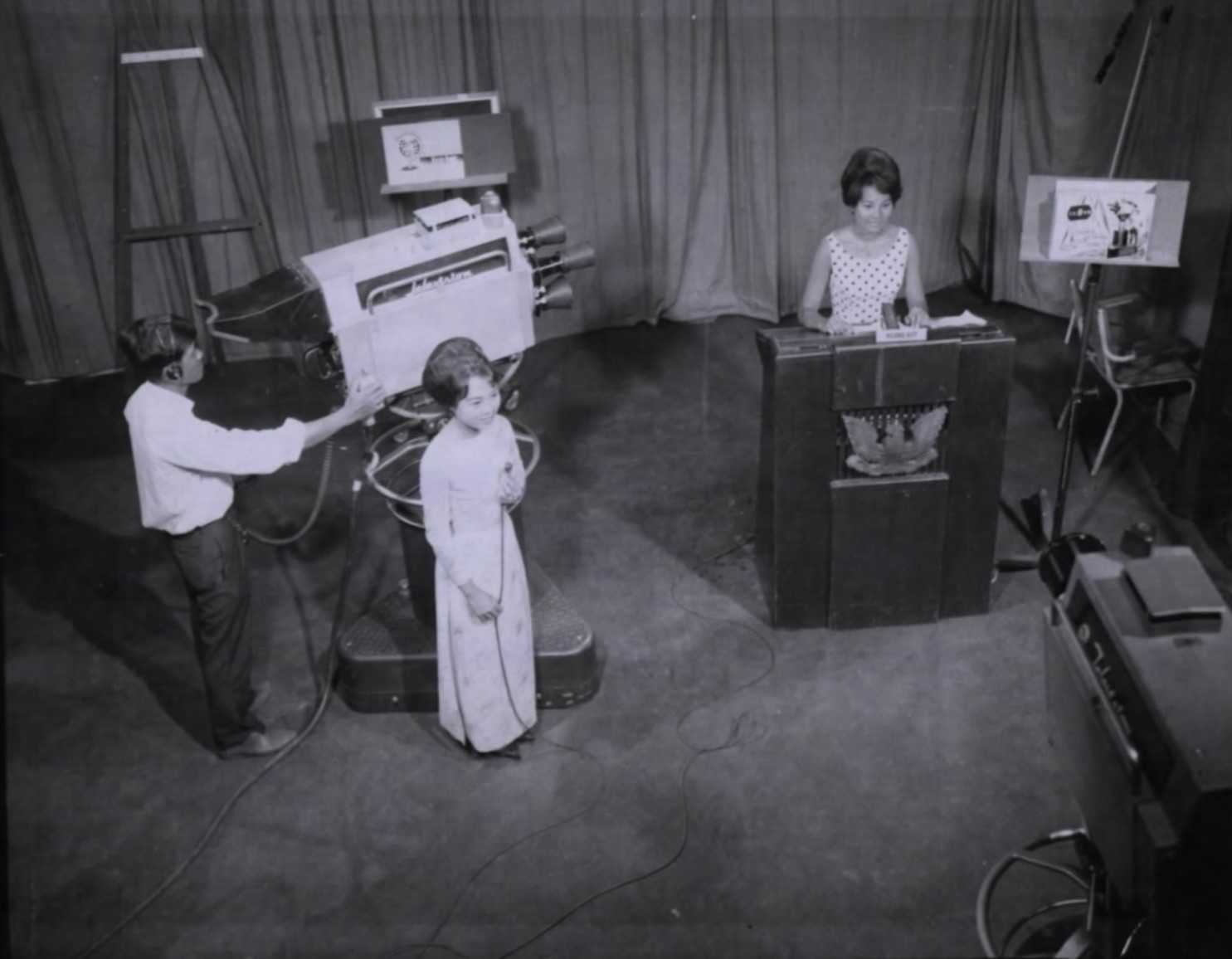
Two female newscasters stand by in the studio on 23 January 1967

Time	Thursday, March 2, 1972
18:00	Signal theme and saluting to the national flag, then the present of daily list
18:05	Short news
18:10	Civil defence
19:00	Announcement
19:05	Weekly news
19:15	New music to audiences
20:00	News
20:30	Mobilize voice
21:00	Criticize
21:10	Mobilize voice (continue)
21:30	Press review
21:40	International news
21:50	Drama Lady from Hatien of Southern Wind band
22:30	Exclusive news
22:35	Drama Lady from Hatien (continue)
24:00	Signal theme and saluting to the national flag, then saying goodbye

List of featured programmes broadcast by the THVN9 :

- 00 giờ (00 o'clock entertainment show) by Thẩm Thúy Hằng
- 15 phút chuyện vui (15 minutes for funny stories) by La Thoại Tân
- Ban thiếu nhi Gió Khơi (Offshore Wind band) by Bùi Duy Tâm & Hùng Lân
- Ban Tiếng Tơ Đồng (Sound-of-Musical-Instrument band) by Hoàng Trọng
- Ban Tuổi Xanh (Green Age band) by Kiều Hạnh
- Chương trình ca nhạc thiếu nhi Nguyễn Đức (Nguyen Duc's show)
- Chương trình thiếu nhi Xuân Phát (Xuan Phat's show) by Xuân Phát
- Đố vui để học (Funny charades for study) by Vũ Khắc Khoan (producer), Đinh Ngọc Mô (announcer) and Cao Thanh Tùng (announcer)
- Giác ngộ (Awakening) by Unified Buddhist Church of Vietnam
- Giờ kịch Kim Cương (Kim Cuong's drama show)
- Giờ kịch Sống (Life's drama show) by Túy Hồng
- Giờ kịch Thẩm Thúy Hằng (Tham Thuy Hang's drama show)
- Giờ kịch Vũ Đức Duy (Vu Duc Duy's drama show)
- Giờ Mai Lệ Huyền (Mai Le Huyen's show)
- Giờ nhạc trẻ (Young Music's show) by Trường Kỳ & Nam Lộc
- Hoa bách hợp (Fleur-de-lys) by Vietnamese Scout Association
- Hoa hồng xám (Grey Roses's drama show) by Tâm Phan
- Hoàng Thi Thơ (Hoang Thi Tho's show)
- Hoa thế hệ (Flowers from our generation)
- Nhóm Tiếng Hát Đôi Mươi (Singing-of-Age-Twenty's show) by Trần Thiện Thanh
- Phúc âm (Gospel's hour) by Christian and Missionary Alliance of Vietnam
- Tạp lục Tùng Lâm (Tung Lam's vaudeville) / Tiếu vương hội (Comedy kings) by Tùng Lâm
- Thép súng (For Soldiers)
- Thế giới trẻ em (World of children) by Lê Văn Khoa
- Thể thao (Sport's hour)
- Tiếng chuông chùa (Bell ring from the pagoda) by Unified Buddhist Church of Vietnam
- Tuồng cải lương (Reformed theater's hour)
- Tuyển lựa ca sĩ (Selection of singers)
- Truyền hình Đắc Lộ (Alexandre de Rhodes's hour) by Archdiocese of Saigon
- [...]

Nearby permanent programmes, THVN9's directorate permitted all of South Vietnames citizens to have the right to "bidding" (đấu thầu) for buying the TV signal. Normally including officials, scholars, especially artists (vocalists, actors...). Languages included Vietnamese (primarily), Chinese, French, English, Khmer and Montagnard.

In divided Vietnam, the highlight of Vietnamese Catholicism and the Fátima messages was the visit of one of a few official statues of Our Lady of Fátima to South Vietnam in 1965. Originally scheduled for a three-month visit, this particular statue came from the Blue Army chapter in Australia and ended up traveling the country until 1967. It was known as the “immaculate heart” statue because it puts her heart on the outside. This event was THVN (at the trial phase) lively recorded.

Nearby the media, THVN9 Network also sponsored the Young Music Festival (Note: Đại-hội Nhạc-trẻ) and Vietnam Film Day (Note: Ngày Điện-ảnh Việtnam). During the 1970s, Young Music Festival was the biggest cultural event in Asia and Oceania. It has attracted many vocalists and bands from South Vietnam, Philippines, Hong Kong, Taiwan, Japan, South Korea, Australia, New Zealand and even the United States. Their purpose was an anti-war exhortation and a supporting peace for whole world.

On 27 April 1971, THVN9 reported Taiwanese singer Teresa Teng's tour. She performed at Lệ Thanh Theatre, Bát Đạt Grand Hotel in the capital Saigon for a month, then visited the Western Delta. Teng performed first hit No (Note: Không) of composer Nguyễn Ánh 9 by Japanese and Mandarin language.

== Cultural significance ==
=== Inheritances ===
After 30 April 1975, total of videotapes were transferred to People's Army of Vietnam's Archives at No. 83 Lý Nam Đế street in Hanoi. However, some still existed by collectors. Many other copytapes were held by governments such as Australia, Canada, Denmark (Danish Vietnamese Association), France (AFP), West Germany, Hong Kong, India, Japan, New Zealand, Philippines, South Korea (KBS), Taiwan, Thailand, United Kingdom (BBC), United States (AP). Besides, many of them were still used by modern Vietnamese filmmakers to do propaganda documentary ones.

From 2010, journalist Lê Quang Thanh Tâm has begun sharing some THVN9 tapes to Facebook and YouTube. Although clause as old reports of singers and actors. In 2020, he has ever litigated Asia Entertainment Inc. (Trung tâm Asia) for a copyright theft when they registered as an owner on YouTube channel with these tapes.

In Los Angeles during the 1980s, some former technicians re-established THVN9 to broadcast news and dramas by Vietnamese language for service to the Vietnamese American community. They registered a trademark as the Abroad-THVN Television Network (Vietnamese: Truyền-hình Việt-nam Hải-ngoại) to differentiate former THVN9 or Domestic-THVN.

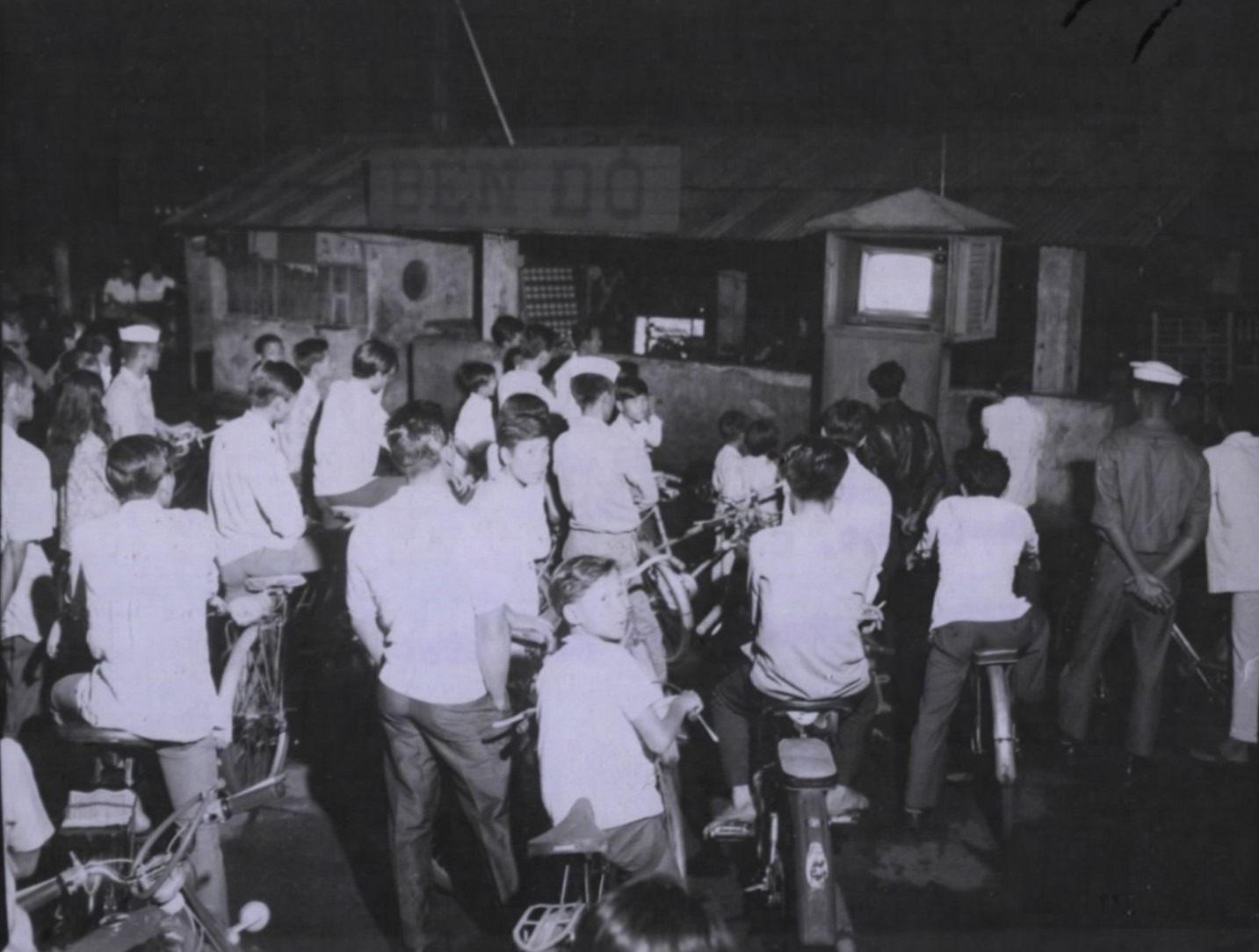
Civilians watch TV on the Saigon waterfront in January 1967

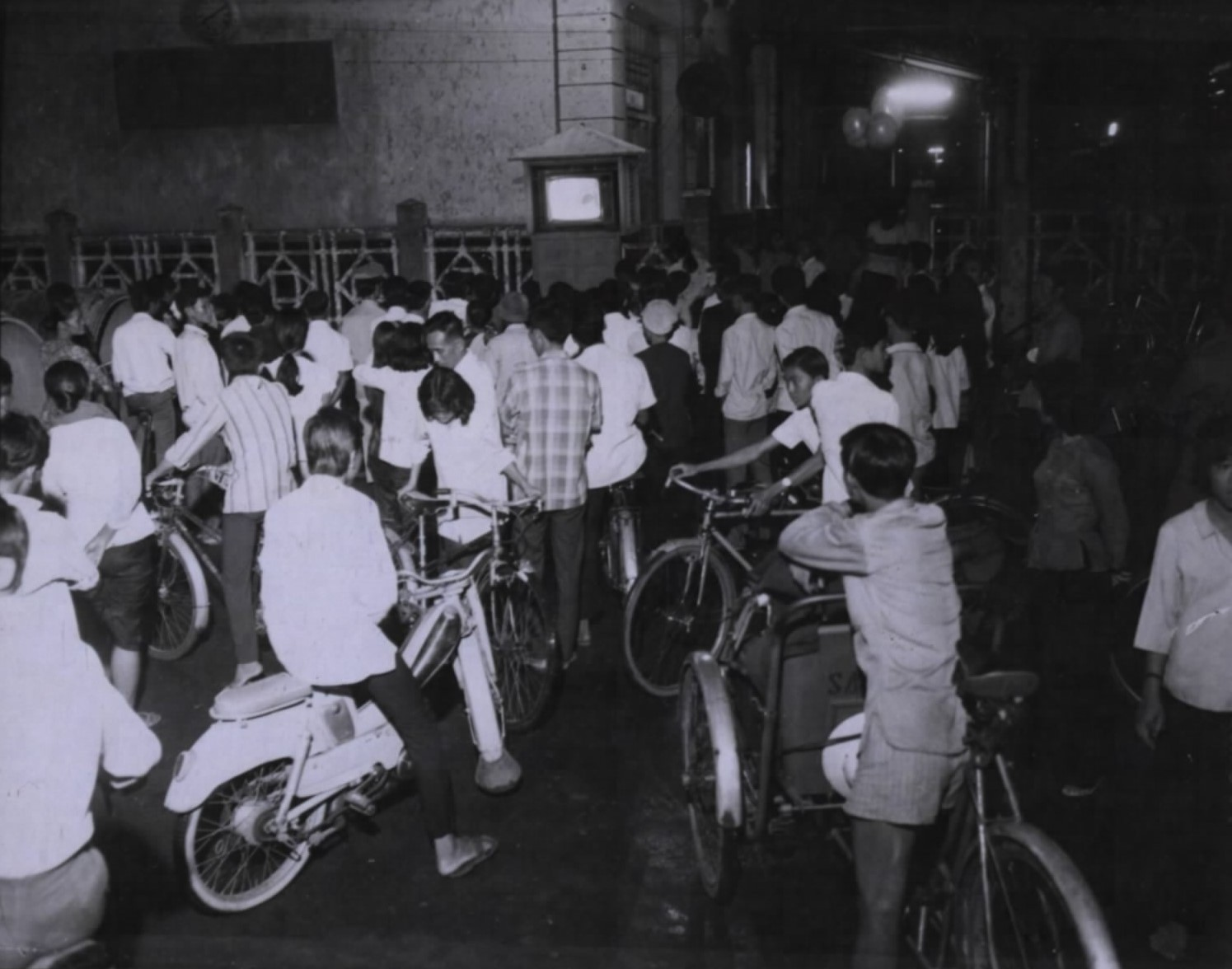
Civilians watching TV at Saigon market in January 1967

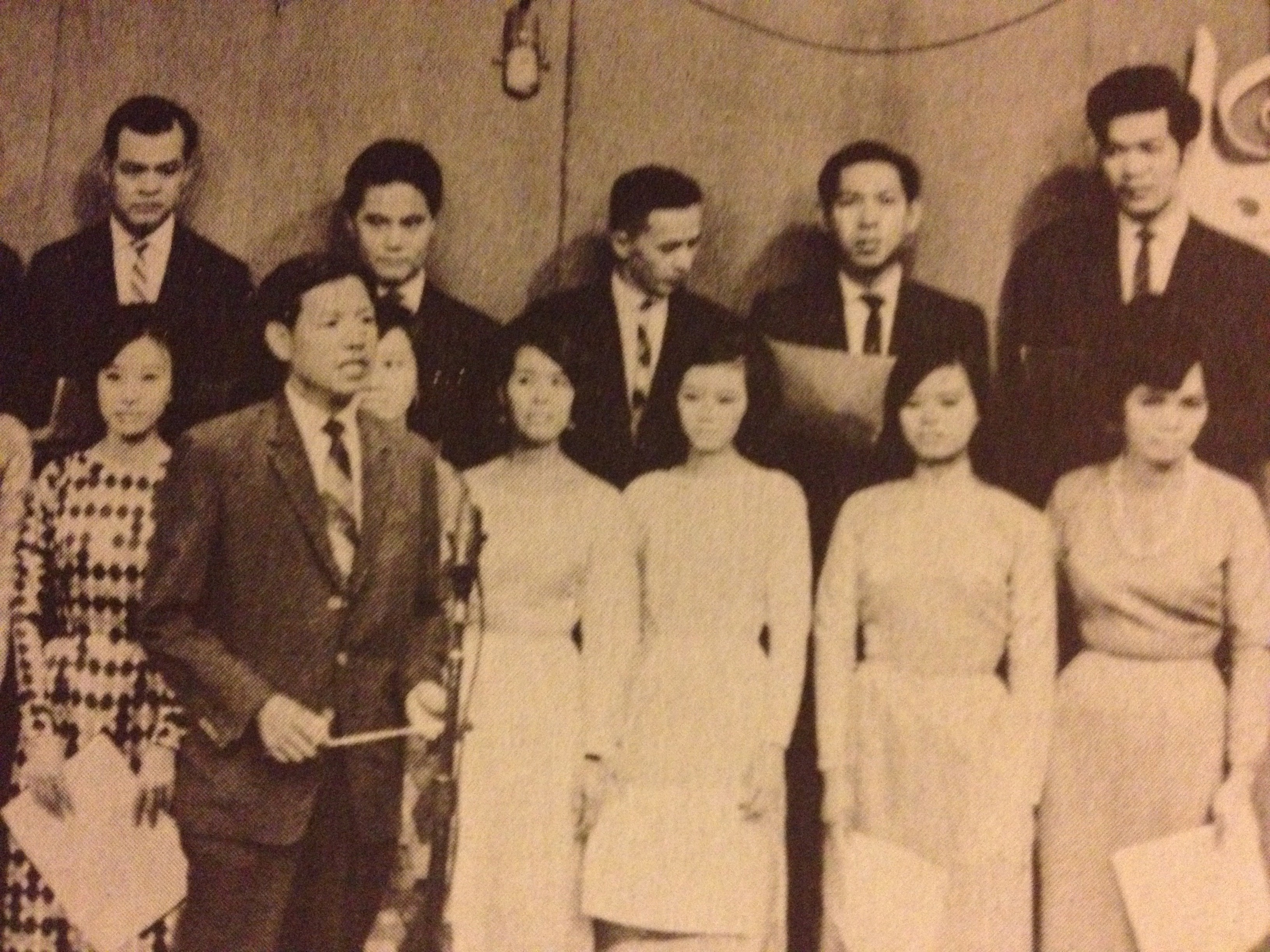
Composer Hoàng Trọng and Sound-of-Musical-Instrument band in 1968

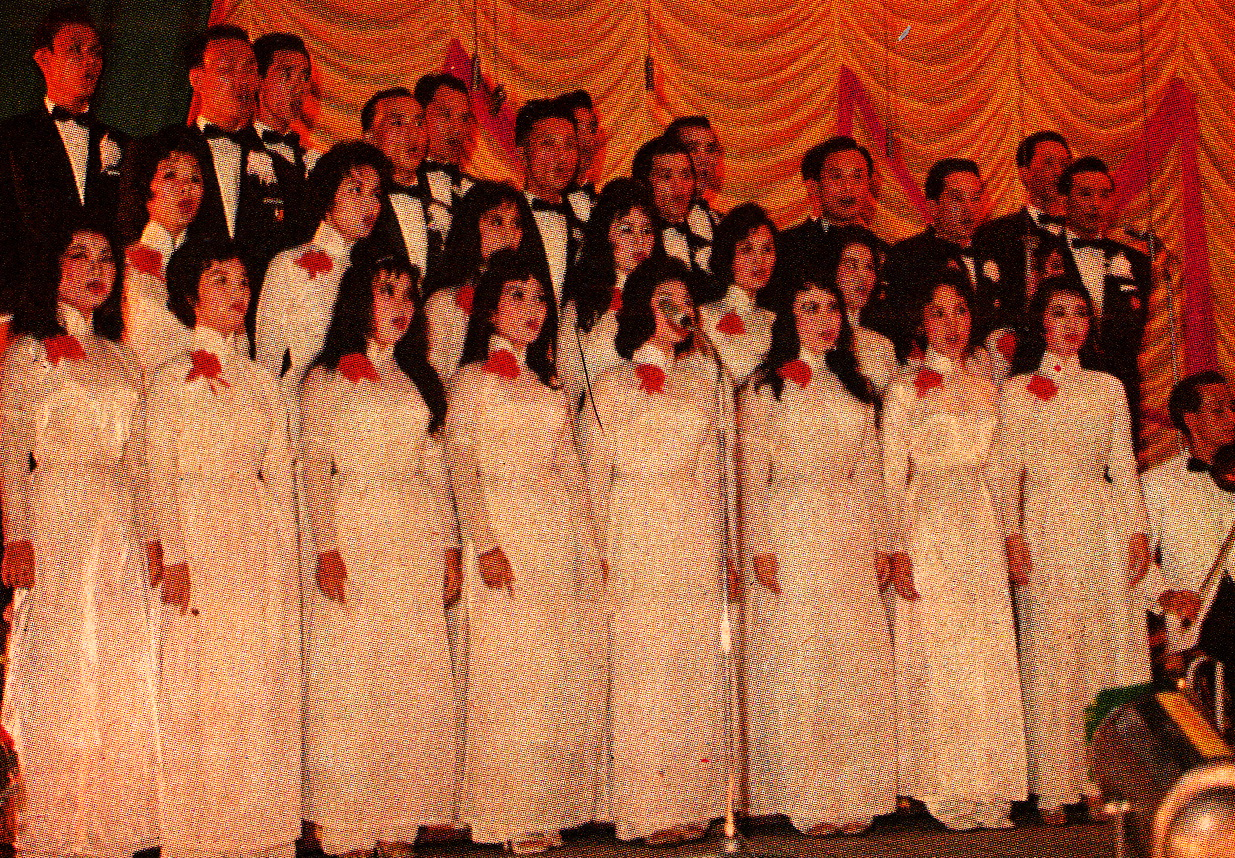
Hoàng Thi Thơ's choir on television

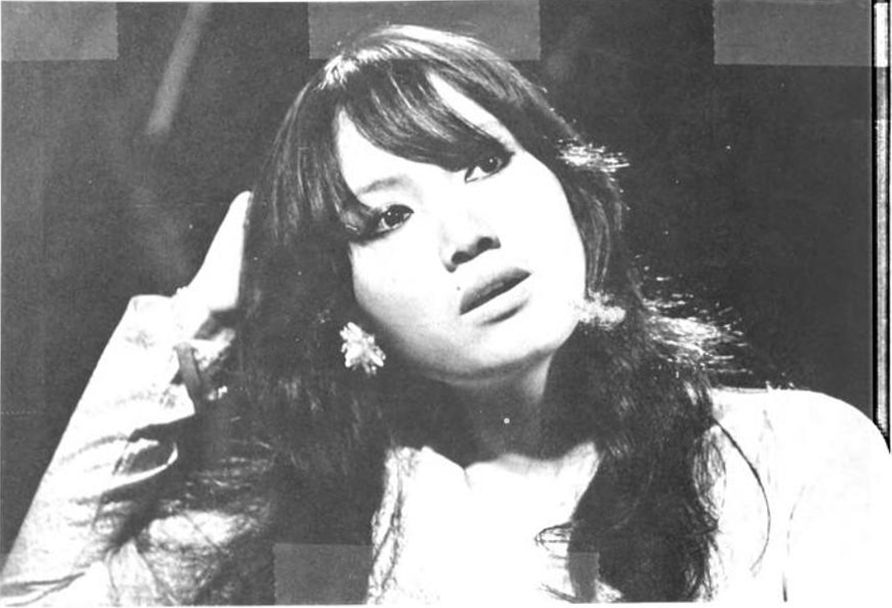
Singer Thanh Lan on TV show, 1970

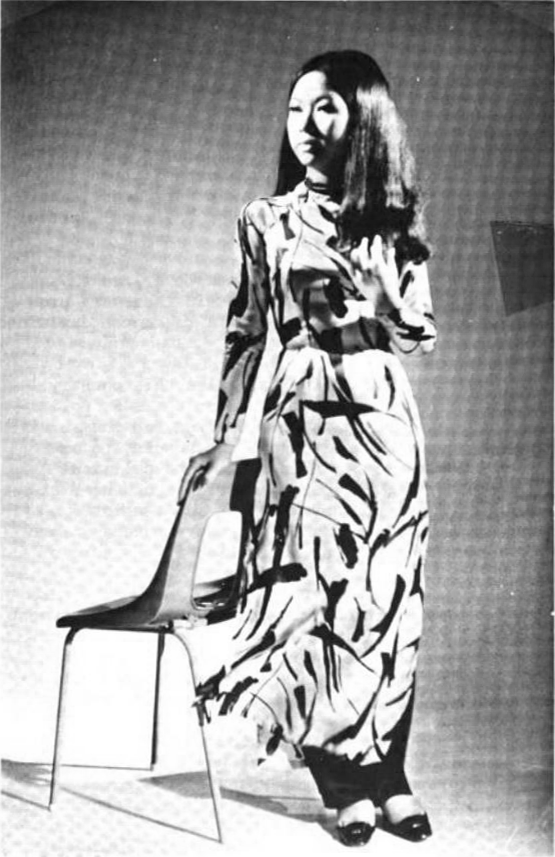
Singer Phương Hồng Hạnh on TV show, 1971

== See also ==
- Hue Television (Đài Truyền-hình Huế, THH1)
- Quynhon Television (Đài Truyền-hình Quy-nhơn, THQN3)
- Nhatrang Television (Đài Truyền-hình Nha-trang, THNT5)
- Cantho Television (Đài Truyền-hình Cần-thơ, THCT7)
- Radio Vietnam
- Ho Chi Minh City Television
- Vietnam Television
- Media in South Vietnam
