= Love Tie =

1963 film by Lê Mộng Hoàng

- Directed by: Lê Mộng Hoàng
- Screenplay by: Nguyễn Thành Châu
- Based on: Musical play Time Before the Military Service Day by Quốc Hưng and Lê Khanh
- Produced by: Lưu Trạch Hưng
- Starring: La Thoại Tân; Thẩm Thúy Hằng; Mai Ly; Năm Châu; Thanh Thúy
- Music by: Phạm Duy; Lê Thương
- Production company: Mỹ Vân Films
- Distributed by: Mỹ Vân Films; Vietnam National Institute of Film
- Release date: 1963
- Running time: 90 minutes
- Country: Republic of Vietnam
- Language: Vietnamese

Love Tie or Time Before Military Service Day (Vietnamese: Tơ tình, hay là Trước ngày quân dịch) is a 1963 South Vietnamese 35mm black-and-white film directed by Lê Mộng Hoàng.

== Plot ==
A love story of Dũng, a playboy from the National Conservatory of Music and Lệ Trinh, a cabaret songstress.

== Production ==
Location is Saigon in 1963 while before the 1 November coup.

=== Art ===
- Type: Romance, feature.
- Studio: Mỹ Vân Films
- Print: National Cinema Centre
- Directors: Lê Mộng Hoàng
- Screenplay: Nguyễn Thành Châu
- Composer: Phạm Duy
- Theme songs by Hoàng Thi Thơ (with Tình đêm liên hoan), Nguyễn Hiền (w. Đường tơ thôi lưu luyến), Văn Phụng (w. Tôi đi giữa hoàng hôn), Trúc Phương (w. Tơ vương & Chuyện chúng mình) and Phạm Duy (w. Tơ tình).

=== Cast ===
- Thẩm Thúy Hằng as Lệ Trinh
- Mai Ly as Thu Hà
- La Thoại Tân as Trần Anh Dũng
- Tâm Đan as Hồng Liên
- Thanh Thúy as Herself as cabaret singer
- Bảy Nhiêu as Trần Anh Kiệt
- Hữu Phước as Biết
- Lê Thương as Mr. Công
- Hoàng Mai as Lâm
- Năm Châu

with musicians and dancers of the Vietnam Artists Association (Đoàn Văn nghệ Việt Nam).
