= The Reluctant Millionaire =

1974 film by Lê Hoàng Hoa

- Kiều Hạnh, Ngọc Tuyết and Văn Chung in the scene.
- Vietnamese: Triệu phú bất đắc dĩ
- Hán-Nôm: 兆富不得以
- Directed by: Lê Hoàng Hoa; Bùi Nhật Quang
- Screenplay by: Nguyễn Phương
- Produced by: Quốc Phong
- Starring: Thanh Việt; Thanh Nga; Ngọc Tuyết; Ngọc Đức; Khả Năng
- Cinematography: Lưu Hải Lâm; Lê Thiện Minh
- Music by: Hoàng Trọng; Nguyễn Minh Trí
- Production companies: Mỹ Vân Films; Liên Ảnh Motion Picture
- Distributed by: Mỹ Vân Films; Vietnam National Institute of Film
- Release date: 2 February 1974
- Running time: 90 minutes
- Country: Vietnam
- Languages: Vietnamese; Chinese (subtitle)

The Occasional Millionaire or The Reluctant Millionaire (Vietnamese: Triệu phú bất đắc dĩ, Chinese: 兆富的不得以) is a 1973 Vietnamese 35mm eastmancolor film directed by Lê Hoàng Hoa.

== Production ==
Location is Saigon and Vũng Tàu in 1974.

=== Art ===
- Genre : Adventure, comedy, romance, action, crime.
- Production director : Quốc Phong
- Art director : Lưu Trạch Hưng
- Director : Lê Hoàng Hoa
- Dialogue : Nguyễn Phương
- Technology scene : Lê Hoàng Hoa
- Director assistant : Bùi Nhật Quang
- Camera : Lưu Hải Lâm
- Photograph director : Diên An
- Photograph assistant : Lê Thiện Minh
- Film assembly : Nguyễn Bá Lộc
- Text : Nguyễn Vi Cartoon Studio
- Secretary : Phương Hồng Loan
- Music : Hoàng Trọng, Nguyễn Minh Trí
- Sound : Lê Văn Kính, Tô Minh Đức
- Costume : Thiết Lập & Tuấn Tailorshop
- Make up : Âu Ân Bình
- Electromechanic : Trương Sĩ Liên

=== Cast ===
- Thanh Việt
- Thanh Nga
- Ngọc Tuyết
- Văn Chung
- Ngọc Đức
- Thanh Hoài
- Túy Hoa
- Kiều Hạnh
- Thanh Long
- Phương Hồng Ngọc
- Trần Tỷ
- Lê Hiền
- Khả Năng
- Bé Bự
- Huy Khanh
- Bảo Lâm
- Duy Phúc
- Minh Sơn
- Văn Phương
- Vân An
- Quang Phước
- Thế Vi
- Quỳnh Mai
