= The White Silk Dress =

- The film poster.
- Directed by: Luu Huynh
- Written by: Luu Huynh
- Produced by: Phuoc Sang Films
- Starring: Trương Ngọc Ánh, Nguyễn Quốc Khánh
- Music by: Đức Trí
- Distributed by: Phuoc Sang Films
- Release date: October 13, 2006 (Pusan International Film Festival)
- Running time: 142 minutes
- Country: Vietnam
- Language: Vietnamese
- Budget: US$2 million

The White Silk Dress (Vietnamese: Áo lụa Hà Đông) is a 2006 Vietnamese war film directed by Luu Huynh starring Truong Ngoc Anh and Nguyen Quoc Khanh. With a budget of over 2 million dollars, it is one of the most expensive Vietnamese films ever made.

== Plot ==
The story begins in Ha Dong, Northern Vietnam in 1954 (now part of Hanoi), amid crumbling French colonial rule in Vietnam. Dan and Gu are servants in different households who suffer at the hands of cruel masters. They are also lovers. After Gu's master is assassinated, Dan and Gu flee south, eventually ending up in the central seaside town of Hoi An. There, they raise a family, with Dan giving birth to four girls. Though impoverished, the family loves and supports each other, even as the horrors of encroaching war threaten to tear them apart.

The story emphasizes the importance of a white silk áo dài (a Vietnamese national garment) Gu had given to Dan as a wedding gift before they fled south, promising her a proper wedding in the future.

They settle in Hoi An when Dan gives birth to their first child, Hoi An. The rainy season begins, and their house floods. Gu searches for their valuable áo dài and finds, wrapped inside, a sprouted areca nut, which is a symbol of marriage from their hometown. Once the nut is planted and grown, Dan will officially become Gu's wife. When the rain stops and the flood withdraws, Dan plants the nut in front of their house.

The rainy season comes and goes, three more daughters are born, and their house is still flooded. The biggest property they own is their small boat used for work. Destitute, Gu catches shellfish while Dan brings them to sell at the local market. Dan's older daughters are on the verge of quitting school because they do not have the áo dàis that are required to attend school. Determined to not let this happen, Dan decides to seek work as a nhũ mẫu, i.e. a wet nurse. She ends up working for an older Chinese man who requires her to let him suck at her breast every morning. Despite feeling miserable and embarrassed, Dan continues this work for the sake of her family. She is discovered by Gu and reprimanded. Ultimately, she decides to alter her own precious áo dài to make a version for her daughters to share.

Hoi An used to ask her father: "Is peace beautiful, daddy?". However, she would not live long enough to experience this peace. Thanks to her parents' sacrifice, Hoi An writes an essay about her áo dài. As she is reading this essay to her class, a bomb hits the school. Upon discovering this, Dan rushes to the school to find Hoi An and her classmates have been killed.

Tragedy continues when Dan dies while collecting wood, trying to earn extra money for her daughters' education. She is swept away during heavy rain. Gu dies soon after trying to rescue Dan's áo dài after their home is bombed.

The movie ends with a scene during the Reunification in 1975.

The film ultimately is a tribute to the strength and heart of the Vietnamese woman, as symbolized through the áo dài.

== Actors ==
- Trương Ngọc Ánh as Dần
- NSƯT Quốc Khánh as Gù
- Nguyễn Thu Trang as Hội An
- Trần Thiên Tú as Ngô
- Đỗ Thu Hằng as Lụt
- NSND Việt Anh as Ông Tám
- Tú Trinh as Bà Tám
- NSƯT Tất Bình as Ông Phán
- NSND Như Quỳnh as Bà Phán
- NSND Thanh Vy AS Bà Hiền
- Hà Kiều Anh AS Nhài
- NSƯT Quang Thắng AS Ông Phán lúc trẻ
- Kim Thư as Người giúp việc
- NSND Hồng Vân as Bà mụ
- Bình Minh as Police
- Mạc Can as Ông già chiếu phim
- Ngọc Đặng as Ông Thoòng

== Reception ==
The film was released in Vietnam in 2007 and was a hit, both critically and commercially. It won the top prize at the 2007 Golden Kite Awards (Vietnam's equivalent to the Oscars) and won acclaim at international film festivals. Richard Kuiper of Variety, who had attended the film's screening at the Busan International Film Festival, called it "deeply moving" and remarked that "most audience members were in tears".

- Audience Award at the Busan International Film Festival in South Korea
- Kodak Vision award at the Fukuoka Asian Film Festival in Japan
- Best foreign film at the Golden Rooster Awards in China.

The film was officially selected to represent Vietnam at the 80th Academy Awards in the Best foreign language film category.

Despite its success, the film received criticism and controversy, especially surrounding the director's political leanings as conveyed through the film. This was preceded by similar controversy surrounding the director almost a decade earlier concerning a music video that was perceived to be actively pro-communist by overseas Vietnamese. This time around, Huynh faced fire from both sides rather than just the overseas Vietnamese community. Others question the historical accuracy of the film, as they contend that the Viet Minh uprising would have been unlikely in 1954, having already occurred in 1945. Furthermore, they charge that the modern áo dài, a feature of the urban upper class in the 1930s, was unsuitable to represent lower class Vietnamese women.
