= Four Oddballs of Saigon =

1974 film by La Thoại Tân

Four Oddballs of Saigon Tứ quái Sàigòn
- Directed by: La Thoại Tân; Nguyễn Đức Quỳnh Kỳ
- Screenplay by: Vũ Đức Duy
- Produced by: Quách Thoại Huấn; Quách Thoại Chi
- Starring: La Thoại Tân; Thanh Việt; Khả Năng; Tùng Lâm; Kim Cương; Thẩm Thúy Hằng
- Cinematography: Trần Đình Mưu
- Music by: Nguyễn Minh
- Production company: Lido Films
- Distributed by: Thúy Nga Productions
- Release date: 1973
- Running time: 101 minutes
- Country: Vietnam
- Language: Vietnamese

Four Oddballs of Saigon or The Saigon Fabulous Four (Vietnamese: Tứ quái Sàigòn) is a 1973 Vietnamese 35mm Eastmancolor film directed by La Thoại Tân.

== Production ==
The film was produced in Saigon in 1973. The football match scene was imitated by Stephen Chow in his 2001 film, Shaolin Soccer.

=== Art ===
- Sound : Nguyễn Linh, Nguyên Vũ
- Costume : Thiết Lập Tailor-shop
- Make-up : Âu Ân Bình

=== Cast ===
- La Thoại Tân as Lúa / Riz
- Thanh Việt as Râu / Barbe
- Khả Năng as Mập / Graisse
- Tùng Lâm as Lùn / Nain
- Kim Cương as Nhài / Jasmin
- Thẩm Thúy Hằng as Yến / Hirondelle
- Văn Giai as Tycoon
- Pauline Ngọc as Bar singer
- Túy Hoa as A lady who organizes the play "Love story of Lubu and Diaochan"
- Bảo Lâm
- Hùng Phương
- Tùng Phình
- René
- Ngọc Oanh
- Văn Hiếu
- Minh Chánh
- Tư Rọm
- Chí Hiếu
- Đức Phú
- Hoài Mỹ
- Quách Phát
- Hải Thần
- Nguyễn Văn Tầm
- Hoài Dung
- Nguyễn Huỳnh Phước
- Thanh Hồng
- Hoàng Lương
- Tám Trống
- Hải Linh

== Release ==
The movie was released around Asia in the 1974 Lunar New Year with Chinese, English and French subtitles.

== See also ==
- Five Bumpkins
- Shaolin Soccer
