= Muoi: The Legend of a Portrait =

Mười: The Legend of a Portrait
- Hangul: 므이
- RR: Meui
- MR: Mŭi
- Directed by: Kim Tae-kyeong
- Written by: Zizak, Harshal Gire
- Starring: Jo An; Cha Ye-ryun; Anh Thư
- Cinematography: Park Jae-hong
- Edited by: Ko Im-pyo
- Music by: Ryu Hyeong-wook
- Distributed by: Cinema Service; CJ Entertainment (South Korea); Phuoc Sang Films (Vietnam)
- Release dates: July 25, 2007 (South Korea); December 24, 2007 (Vietnam)
- Running time: 93 minutes
- Countries: South Korea; Vietnam
- Languages: Korean; Vietnamese
- Box office: US$1,245,621

Mười: The Legend of a Portrait (Korean: 므이) is a 2007 horror film starring Jo An, Cha Ye-ryun and Anh Thu. It became the first horror film in Vietnam after the Fall of Saigon as well as the first rated film in Vietnam.

== Plot ==
Struggling writer Yun-hee is intrigued by a local Vietnamese folklore centered around a girl named "Mười" and her haunted portrait. Invited by Seo-yeon, an old friend now residing in Vietnam, Yun-hee prepares for her trip.

A brief discussion with her friends Seong-eun and Ji-hoon reveals that Yun-hee’s previous book titled "Secrets & Lies", a semi-autobiographical novel, portrayed Seo-yeon in negative lights. Yun-hee assures herself Seo-Yeon hasn't read the book, which was published after her departure from Korea.

Seo-yeon welcomes Yun-hee's arrival in and invites Yun-hee to stay at her large mansion. Seo-yeon asks about their mutual friends, but Yun-hee lies that she had lost contact with them.

The next day, the two take a boat ride to an abandoned house, where Seo-yeon reveals more details of the legend. The young Muoi fell in love with a painter named Nguyen. Hong, his wealthy fiancé, hires several thugs who cripples Muoi, and personally disfigures her face with acid. Muoi committed suicide, turning into a vengeful spirit. The event happened at the abandoned house they are now in.

Seo-yeon and Yun-hee go to the office of professor Kim, who studied Vietnamese folklore and introduced Seo-yeon to the legend. Yun-hee bluffs her way past his assistant Eun-jung and steals a notebook with his research.

As Yun-hee delves deeper into the legend, she experiences more supernaturnal phenomena, including strange noises, fluttering shadows, hallucinations, and nightmares of Muoi's tortures being reinacted on her. Cracks were revealed between the two, with Seo-yeon discovering Yun-hee has been lying and staying in contact with Ji-hoon. Yun-hee, in turn, seems to harbor some resentments. A night of heavy drinking culminates with her making a scene and calling Seo-yeon a slut for dancing with other bargoers. The next day, Seo-yeon acts like nothing happened, but the tension remains.

Yun-hee speaks to Eun-jung, who reveals that Seo-yeon introduced professor Kim to the legend of Muoi, not the other way around. On professor Kim's computer, Yun-hee watches curse' supposed victim describing the same symptoms that she has been experiencing, including seeing Muoi's reflection in the mirror.

Against Seo-yeon's warning, Yun-hee enters her painting studio and discovers Seo-yeon's self-portrait, in the same style as Muoi's. She also finds a copy of "Secrets & Lies," with highlights of the horrible things written about her. Yun-hee confronts Seo-yeon, accusing her of trying to put a curse on her. Seo-yeon doesn't deny, but wishes Yun-hee a safe trip home.

As Yun-hee packs her belongings, Seo-yeon reveals her reason for leaving Korea. Three years ago, Ji-hoon and his friends sexually assaulted Seo-yeon, which Seong-eun recorded on her camera. They then spread rumors about her promiscuity. A shocked Yun-hee apologized for buying into the rumors and reinforcing them with her book. Seo-yeon forgives Yun-hee and tells her to go to the temple to learn more about the curse. At night, Seo-yeon witnesses Yun-hee's body was contorting painfully, unable to cry for help.

Yun-hee and Eun-jung go to the temple where the cursed painting used to be kept. She learned that the portrait containing Muoi's spirit was painted by Nguyen himself, with him working with the monks to trap her. In World War 2, a Japanese major named yoshimoto raided the temple and broke the seal, thereby unleashing the curse. Handing Yun-hee a metal hairpin used to seal the spirit, the head monk instructs her to stab the possessed Seo-yeon to end the curse.

After Eun-jung is killed in a bizarre accident, the initially reluctant Yun-hee returns to the mansion with the metal pin. In her room, she discovers a secret passageway with professor Kim's body. On the corpse was Major Yoshimoto's photo with the caption "Death begins the curse." Venturing into the tunnel, Yun-hee finds a tape recorder with recordings from professor Kim, which reveals the mansion belongs to major Yoshimoto and had been housing Muoi's portrait all along.

In a large chamber housing the real portrait, Muoi's monstrous spirit finally manifests and a brief chase ensues, ending with Yun-hee stabbing Seo-yeon with the hairpin. A satisfied Seo-yeon laughs and says her death will begin the curse. A pair of hand grabs Yun-hee's neck, lifting her off the ground as Seo-yeon dies. Back at the temple, Seo-yeon's self-portrait appeared in the spot reserved for Muoi's portrait.

It was revealed that the whole plot was set in motion by Seo-yeon, all to take revenge on the people ruining her life. Back in Korea, the now possessed Yun-hee stalks and brutally murders Seo-yeon's former friends. After killing Seong-eun Ji-hoon, she burns off the photo of major Yoshimoto, puts on Muoi's ring and smiles.

== Vietnamese reaction ==
Muoi is considered the first horror film production to be made in Vietnam. Despite high public expectation, the picture also received bad reactions.

Upon examination, it received a disapproval from Vietnamese Bureau of Cinema for "unsuitable contents," which led to a delay in Vietnamese release. Because of this, it became the second horror film to be released in Vietnam, while another in the genre, Ngoi nha ma am/Suoi oan hon (Haunted House/Ghosted Stream), came out in August.

Finally, Muoi was released on December 24, 2007, with the first rating in Vietnamese film history: an under-16 ban for disturbing violence and horror image. Though stuck with this restriction, Muoi also had to suffer from scene cuts requested by the bureau. These include Muoi's right leg breakage, a monk's body falling, and Eun-jung's death.

== Awards ==
At 2008's 7th Golden Kite Awards (the local equivalent of the Oscars), Phuoc Sang Films chose to send Muoi to the examining judge; afterwards, controversy arose because it was not considered a "real Vietnamese film" (most of the film was shot by Koreans). However, the film still received accolades for Best Cinematography and Best Sounds.

== Cast ==
- Jo An as Yoon-hee
- Cha Ye-ryun as Seo-yeon
- Anh Thư as Muoi
- Hong Anh as Hong
- Hong So-hee as Eun-jung
- Lim Seong-eon
- Lý Nhã Kỳ as young girl

== See also ==
- Ghosts in Vietnamese culture
- Onryō
- Japanese Urban Legends
- The Amityville Horror (folk story)
- The Grudge (film series)
- Fatal Frame (video game series)
