= Wandering Soul =

2016 Australian horror short film

- Directed by: Josh Tanner
- Screenplay by: Josh Tanner; Jade van der Lei
- Produced by: Jade van der Lei
- Starring: Lap Phan; Henry Vo; Cuong Nguyen; Otto Bots; Alex Fitzalan; David Normand
- Cinematography: Jason Hargreaves
- Edited by: Geoff Lamb
- Music by: Guy Gross
- Production company: Perception Pictures
- Release date: October 2016; (Sitges)
- Running time: 13 minutes
- Country: Australia
- Languages: Vietnamese; English

Wandering Soul is a 2016 Australian horror short film written and directed by Josh Tanner and produced by Jade van der Lei. Set during the Vietnam War, the film follows a Viet Cong soldier in the Củ Chi tunnels who is haunted by the ghost of a fallen comrade. It received financial support from Screen Australia and post-production funds from the Asia Pacific Screen Awards, with executive producers Michael and Peter Spierig (Predestination, Winchester). The film had its world premiere at the 49th Sitges International Fantastic Film Festival in 2016 and went on to win multiple awards at international film festivals.

== Plot ==
During the Vietnam War, a Viet Cong soldier named Dao is conducting a burial rite for a fallen comrade in the Củ Chi tunnels. A fellow soldier, Quan, urges him to flee before approaching American forces arrive. Dao refuses to abandon the ceremony, believing that an incomplete burial will leave his comrade's spirit unable to rest. After Quan departs, the ghost of the dead soldier begins to manifest in the tunnels.

== Background ==
The film is inspired by Operation Wandering Soul, a psychological warfare tactic employed by U.S. forces during the Vietnam War that exploited Vietnamese spiritual beliefs about the dead. Director Josh Tanner has described discovering the historical events as the catalyst for the project, stating he immediately recognised it as a story worth telling. He and co-writer Jade van der Lei conceived the short as a proof of concept for a planned feature film.

The production shot over three days: two days on tunnel sets built at Village Roadshow Studios on the Gold Coast, and one night in the jungle of Mount Tamborine, Queensland. The production received cultural and historical guidance from advisors from the Vietnamese community and Vietnam War historians.

== Cast ==
- Lap Phan as Dao
- Henry Vo as Quan
- Cuong Nguyen
- Otto Bots
- Alex Fitzalan as an American medic
- David Normand

== Production ==
The film was produced by Perception Pictures with financing from Screen Australia and post-production support from the Asia Pacific Screen Awards. Executive producers were Michael Spierig and Peter Spierig, the Australian directors known for Predestination (2014) and Winchester (2018). The cinematography was handled by Jason Hargreaves ACS, whose work on the film later earned him a national award, and the score was composed by Guy Gross.

== Reception ==
The film was praised for its production values and genre-blending approach. Short of the Week called it "a tense and unsettling watch" that gains impact from its historical grounding. Mystery Tribune described it as having "a great ghost story set during the Vietnam War that is inspired by bizarre but absolutely true events." The film was also featured on the horror platform ALTER and the curation site Bloody Disgusting.

== Festival run ==
The film had its world premiere at the 49th Sitges International Fantastic Film Festival in 2016 and screened at numerous international festivals, including Palm Springs International ShortFest, the Moscow International Film Festival, Flickerfest, and the Neuchâtel International Fantastic Film Festival.

Full festival list:

- 49th Sitges International Fantastic Film Festival, 2016 (world premiere)
- Screamfest Film Festival, 2016
- Show Me Shorts, 2016
- ZINEBI – Bilbao Short and Documentary Film Festival, 2016
- Encounters Film Festival, 2017
- Flickerfest International Short Film Festival, 2017
- Newport Beach Film Festival, 2017
- Brussels Short Film Festival, 2017
- St Kilda Film Festival, 2017
- Fantaspoa International Fantastic Film Festival, 2017
- Palm Springs International ShortFest, 2017
- Moscow International Film Festival, 2017
- Neuchâtel International Fantastic Film Festival, 2017
- Revelation Perth International Film Festival, 2017

== Accolades ==
Year	Award	Category	Result
2017	HollyShorts Film Festival	Best Horror Short	Won
2017	Phoenix Film Festival	Best Horror Short	Won
2017	Canberra Short Film Festival	Best Director	Won
2017	Australian Cinematographers Society Awards	Best Cinematography in a Short Film	Won
2017	Australian Directors Guild Awards	Best Direction in a Short Film	Nominated
2017	St Kilda Film Festival	Craft Award	Nominated
