= La Thoại Tân =

Vietnamese actor (1937–2008)

- Born: Phạm Văn Tần; 24 April 1937; Saigon, Cochinchina
- Died: 13 March 2008 (aged 70); Los Angeles, US
- Occupations: Actor; director; screenwriter; producer; singer; master of ceremonies; journalist
- Years active: 1950s–2008
- Spouse: Nguyễn Thị Ngọc Anh
- Children: 2

La Thoại Tân (Chinese: 羅瑞賓) is a pseudonym of Phạm Văn Tần (Chinese: 范文秦, 24 April 1937 – 13 March 2008), buddhist name Nhật Biện (Chinese: 日昪), who was a Vietnamese American actor and singer.

== Biography ==
La Thoai Tan was born on April 24, 1937 in Saigon with the original name Pham Van Tan, is a multi-talented artist, in addition to acting, acting, and singing, he also works in the field of journalism. MC, film director.

Entering the art village, La Thoai Tan was famous as the "beautiful couple" of the Republic of Vietnam cinema before 1975.

Before 1975, La Thoai Tan was the main actor in films such as: Truong Chi My Nuong (1956), To Tinh (1963), Nang (1970), Ganh Hoa (1971), Le stone (1971), Tran Thi Diem Chau (1971), My House (1972), Newly Bloomed Flowers (1973), The Four Monsters of Saigon (1973), The Year of the Clown King Returns to the Village (1974).

In the field of theater, La Thoai Tan is also a known name in the drama programs of Kim Cuong, Tham Thuy Hang.[3]

La Thoai Tan was also a popular comedian and his 45-minute funny story program was particularly prominent. In 1974, La Thoai Tan once collaborated with female artist Thanh Nga in a comedy show in Truong Xuan and Duy Ngoc concerts.[3]

La Thoai Tan is also famous for his humorous songs specializing in satirizing bad habits in society such as: Confiding in money-strapped people, Single people, Slandering his wife, ...

After taking refuge and settling in California after the events of April 30, 1975, artist La Thoai Tan continued to perform artistic activities in the Vietnamese community, including Thuy Nga Center, sometimes working as a teacher. MC, until retirement.

Before his death, he lived with his wife, Nguyen Thi Ngoc Anh, and two children: Anna Pham and son Alex Pham, still living in California.

== Career ==
=== Drama ===
- Fear of wife is hero
- The daughter of Mrs Hằng
- Jealousy
- New shirt

=== Film ===
- Trương Chi - Mỵ Nương (1956)
- Bóng người đi (1963)
- Silk of Love (1963)
- Gánh hàng hoa (1971)
- Tear of Stone (1971)
- Trần Thị Diễm Châu (1971)
- My Best Half (1972)
- Hoa Mới Nở (1973)
- Four Oddballs of Saigon
- Five Bumpkins (1974)
- Velvet Eyes
- Phật Thích Ca đắc đạo
- Tứ Quái Sài Gòn
- Đò Chiều
- The Daughter of Mrs Hằng
- Bloody Cassock
- Ngưu Lang – Chức Nữ
- Ly Rượu Mừng
- Gác Chuông Nhà thờ
- Người Chồng Bất Đắc Dĩ
- Biển Động
- Tổ Đặc Công 13
- Vĩnh Biệt Tình Hè
- Family of Mrs Tư
- Family of Mrs Út
- The Lady of the Camellias (1990)
- Dưới hai màu áo

=== Television ===
- Channel 9's show 45 Minutes with Jolly Stories (45 phút chuyện vui), 1970s.
- Channel 9's show Group of comical kings (Tiếu vương hội), 1970s.

== See also ==
- Thành Được
- Hùng Cường
- Trần Thiện Thanh
- Thẩm Thúy Hằng
- Kim Cương
