= Bằng Lăng =

Vietnamese former model and actress

- Born: Ngô Bằng Lăng; 1979 (age 46–47); Ho Chi Minh City, Vietnam
- Occupations: Actress; Model
- Years active: 1997–2009
- Spouse(s): Claas Schaberg |2007-2026
- Children: 2

Vietnamese name
- Vietnamese: Bằng Lăng
- Literal meaning: Lagerstroemia speciosa flowers

Ngô Bằng Lăng (born 1979) is a Vietnamese former model and actress. She began her modeling career in 1997 when she was a student, and finished in Top 10 at Asian Fashion Model Search (later Vietnamese Supermodels) in 2002 and became known for her participation in movies, such as Dance Girls (2003), Street Ciderrella (2004), and Gangsta Girls (2005). She is usually called the Black Pearl of Vietnamese fashion industry.

== Filmography ==
=== Film ===
Year	English title	Original title	Role
2003	Dance Girls	Gái nhảy	Ngọc
2004	Street Cinderella	Lọ Lem đường phố	Ngọc
2004	Gangsta Girls	Nữ tướng cướp	Hồng
2007	Cải ơi	Cải ơi	Thương

=== Television series ===
Year	English title	Original title	Role
2004	Slope of Love	Dốc tình	Nhung
2007	Acapella	Acapella	An
2007	Game of Love	Ván cờ tình yêu	San
2009	Heavenly Wedding-dress	Áo cưới thiên đường	Kim
2009	Maybe We are in Love	Có lẽ nào ta yêu nhau	Sự

== Awards ==
- 2002 – Asian Fashion Model Search Awards for Most Stylish Model
- 2004 – Vietnam Model Awards for Most Impressing Model of the Year
- 2005 – Ochna Integerrima Awards for Best and Most Beloved Actress of the Year
