= Saigon Television =

Saigon Television (Vietnamese: Đài Truyền hình Sài Gòn) may refer to:

- Vietnam Television, the national broadcaster for South Vietnam from 1966 to 1975
- Ho Chi Minh City Television, formerly Saigon Liberation Television
- Saigon Entertainment Television, Saigon TV, and Little Saigon TV, all subchannels of KJLA in Los Angeles
