= Hoang Kieu =

Vietnamese-born American billionaire

Hoang Kieu (Hoàng Kiều, born in Vietnam - Triệu Phong, Quảng Trị Province) is a Vietnamese-born American billionaire who owned 37% of Shanghai RAAS Blood Products in 2013, which is traded on the Shenzhen Stock Exchange. He debuted on the 2014 Forbes Billionaires List, with a net worth of $3.8 billion.
