= The Girl from Dak Lak =

2021 Vietnamese movie

- Directed by: Pedro Roman, Chi Mai
- Release date: 2022
- Country: Vietnam
- Language: Vietnamese

The Girl from Dak Lak (Co gai den tu Dak Lak) is a 2022 Vietnamese movie directed by Pedro Roman and Chi Mai, starring Suong, Hanh Ruby and Tran Thi Thanh Truc. The film was screened at IndieLisboa International Film Festival, D'A Film Festival and 29th Kolkata International Film Festival.

== Plot ==
The story of Suong, a young girl from rural Vietnam, who migrates to the bustling city of Saigon to work in a local eatery with two other migrant workers. The film was published on Amazon Prime.

== Film Festivals ==
- IndieLisboa International Film Festival
- D'A Film Festival and 29th
- Kolkata International Film Festival
- Film girl film festival
