= Operation Wandering Soul =

Propaganda campaign exercised by U.S. forces

Ghost Tape No. 10

Operation Wandering Soul was a propaganda campaign and psychological warfare effort exercised by U.S. forces during the Vietnam War. It was an attempt to increase desertions and defections from Viet Cong forces and weaken their morale. It was also to coerce the Viet Cong forces into leaving and going home, weakening their numbers.

== Warfare campaign ==
Like most cultures, Vietnamese culture includes beliefs and rituals that show respect for the dead. Vietnamese culture calls for a proper burial and it is believed that if this does not occur, the soul of the deceased continues to wander the earth thus becoming a "Wandering Soul," a ghost or spirit.

It is the Vietnamese belief that the dead must be buried in their homeland, or their soul will wander aimlessly in pain and suffering. Vietnamese feel that if a person is improperly buried, then their soul wanders constantly. They can sometimes be contacted on the anniversary of their death and near where they died. Vietnamese honor these dead souls on a holiday when they return to the site where they died. The U.S. used this to their advantage and tried to trick the Viet-Congs into leaving by playing the audio recording of their dead friends wandering around.

=== Voice recordings ===
U.S. engineers spent weeks recording eerie sounds and altered voices, which acted in roles of slain Viet Cong soldiers. The United States brought in South Vietnamese soldiers to record their voices over the tape for authenticity.

One tape, dubbed "Ghost Tape Number Ten", included Buddhist funeral music and eerie sounds. In addition there were voices of a girl saying "Come home, Daddy!" and voices of men telling them to "Go home" and be "reunited with your loved ones" so that they can avoid the same fate as he did.

The Americans played these tapes over loudspeakers from helicopters near Viet Cong positions. This occurred during the night to prevent the Viet Cong from resting.

My body is gone. I am dead, my family. Tragic, how tragic! My friends, I come back to let you know that I am dead. I am dead. I am in hell. … Friends, while you are still alive … go home! … Go home, my friends—before it is too late!

=== Results ===
The overall success of these ghost tapes was mixed, because in the event that the Viet Cong soldiers knew it was just a recording, their immediate response would be to fire upon where the sound was coming from, though this in turn revealed their hidden positions within the jungle. The Army Concept Team which had been responsible for Wandering Soul admitted that the Viet Cong "realized what was going on" but still insisted that the operation had been a success, despite presenting no evidence for their claim. The United States ultimately stopped Ghost 10 in the early 1970s. A similar program was prepared for use in the Congo, with recordings being produced to simulate angry local gods, as a form of population control, to attempt to ensure that the local populations did not leave their villages; however, it was never brought into use.

== See also ==
- Psychological operations (United States)
- Hanoi Hannah
