= Đắc Lộ Television =

Đắc Lộ Television (Truyền hình Đắc Lộ) was a television station and production company in South Vietnam, based in Saigon, administered by Italian Jesuits working at the Đắc Lộ Center. The station existed for part of the 1970s. After reunification under North Vietnam's regime, the station was confiscated.

Đắc Lộ Television collaborated with the Vietnam Television Network (THVN) and, for a brief period after the Fall of Saigon, Saigon Liberation Television, which is the current HTV.

== History ==
Đắc Lộ Television was founded in 1969 and began operating in 1972, under the grounds that THVN barely had airtime for educational programming. Some of its programs were presented in the form of theatrical plays in order to appeal to a wider range of students. Among them were:

- Bóng mát gia đình (Family Shadow): family education;
- Sức khỏe là vàng (Health is Golden): health education, preventing and treating diseases, including complex diseases such as lepra and cancer;
- Thực phẩm và chúng ta (Food and Us): nutrition for health prevention;
- Hồn Nước (Soul of the Country): history and geography of Vietnam;
- Sơn Ca (Nightingale): children's education;
- Em yêu khoa học (I Love Science): science for teenagers.

In order to attract more viewers in more provinces, it set up more teleclubs in 1973.

=== Aftermath ===
With the Fall of Saigon, its studios were absorbed into what is now HTV, and became its children's programming department. In 1976, the Đắc Lộ Center closed and was devolved into the state.
