= The Beauty of Binh Duong =

The beauty of Binh Duong Người đẹp Bình Dương
- Directed by: Nguyễn Thành Châu
- Written by: Nguyễn Thành Châu
- Starring: Thẩm Thúy Hằng; Ba Vân
- Production company: Mỹ Vân Films
- Release date: 1957
- Running time: 90 minutes
- Country: South Vietnam
- Language: Vietnamese

The beauty of Binh Duong (Vietnamese: Người đẹp Bình Dương), or A story of Tam Nuong (Vietnamese: Chuyện Tam Nương) is a 1957 Vietnamese film directed by Nguyễn Thành Châu and starring Thẩm Thúy Hằng.

== Cast ==
- Thẩm Thúy Hằng as Tam Nương
- Nguyễn Đình Dần as Prince Kinh Luân
- Ba Vân as the silk seller
- Bảy Nhiêu as Mr.Đạt
- Thúy Lan as rural girl
- Kim Vui as Lan Hương
- Minh Tâm as Cúc Hương
- Xích Tùng as Trương Thiên
