= In the Name of Love (2012 film) =

2012 film

- Directed by: Luu Huynh
- Written by: Luu Huynh
- Produced by: Luu Huynh
- Starring: Thai Hoa
- Release date: 7 September 2012 (TIFF)
- Running time: 115 minutes
- Country: Vietnam
- Language: Vietnamese

In the Name of Love is a 2012 Vietnamese thriller film directed by Luu Huynh.

== Cast ==
- Thai Hoa
- Huy Khanh as Khanh
- Dinh Y. Nhung as Nhung
