= Live: Phát Trực Tiếp =

- Release poster
- Directed by: Khương Ngọc
- Based on: Đô Thị Linh Dị by Nguyễn Ngọc Thạch
- Produced by: Thien A. Pham; Susan Tran
- Starring: Ngoc Phuoc; Quốc Khánh
- Edited by: Khuong Ngoc
- Production companies: Lotte Entertainment; Live N
- Release date: 22 September 2023
- Running time: 91 minutes
- Country: Vietnam
- Language: Vietnamese
- Box office: ₫ 1.1 billion

Live: Phát Trực Tiếp is a 2023 Vietnamese horror drama film directed by Khương Ngọc and starring Ngoc Phuoc and Quốc Khánh. The film talks about the world of livestream mukbang and also features TikTokers. The story is based on the short story collection Đô Thị Linh Dị by Nguyễn Ngọc Thạch, which features two short stories. The film released to mixed reviews and was a box office failure.

== Cast ==
- Ngoc Phuoc as Trúc
- Quốc Khánh as Hoàng
- Ngân 98 as Emi
- Khả Như
- BB Trần
- Hai Trieu

== Reception ==
=== Critical response ===
A critic from Elle Man wrote that "Although director Khuong Ngoc is delicate in showing framed characters and uses the image of a goldfish in a tank as a metaphor. But his overuse of close-ups and jumpscares makes the scenes ineffective, even laughable. Offensive camera angles when shooting close-ups of women's bodies are also a weakness of the film". A critic from Kênh 14 rated the film three out of five and wrote that "In fact, liking or hating Live: Live Streaming is a very thin line. Because the characters in the movie use very common words and show off their bodies in a vulgar way. Even watching the mukers eat can make people feel nauseous. However, if you feel uncomfortable, it means you have watched the movie exactly as Khuong Ngoc intended". A critic from Viez.vn wrote that "Although it is a notable step by director Khuong Ngoc, it still needs improvement to create better works in the future". A critic from Báo Cần Thơ Online wrote that the film "has a topical and thorny topic but requires more to be truly a good movie. However, director Khuong Ngoc and his crew tried to bring a meaningful film, warning about the negative effects of social networks and making the audience somewhat reconsider their current use of social networks". A critic from Sao Star wrote that "The pace of the film gradually quickens from the first minutes, the transitions are arranged quite smoothly, there are some silences installed, enough for viewers to contemplate". A reviewer of Tiền Phong wrote "Overall, Live: Live Stream has an idea but hasn't done it yet. The script's many errors and limited narrative are minus points that anyone can recognize".
