= Kế Sách district =

Coordinates: 9.833°N 105.917°E

Kế Sách district Huyện Kế Sách
- District
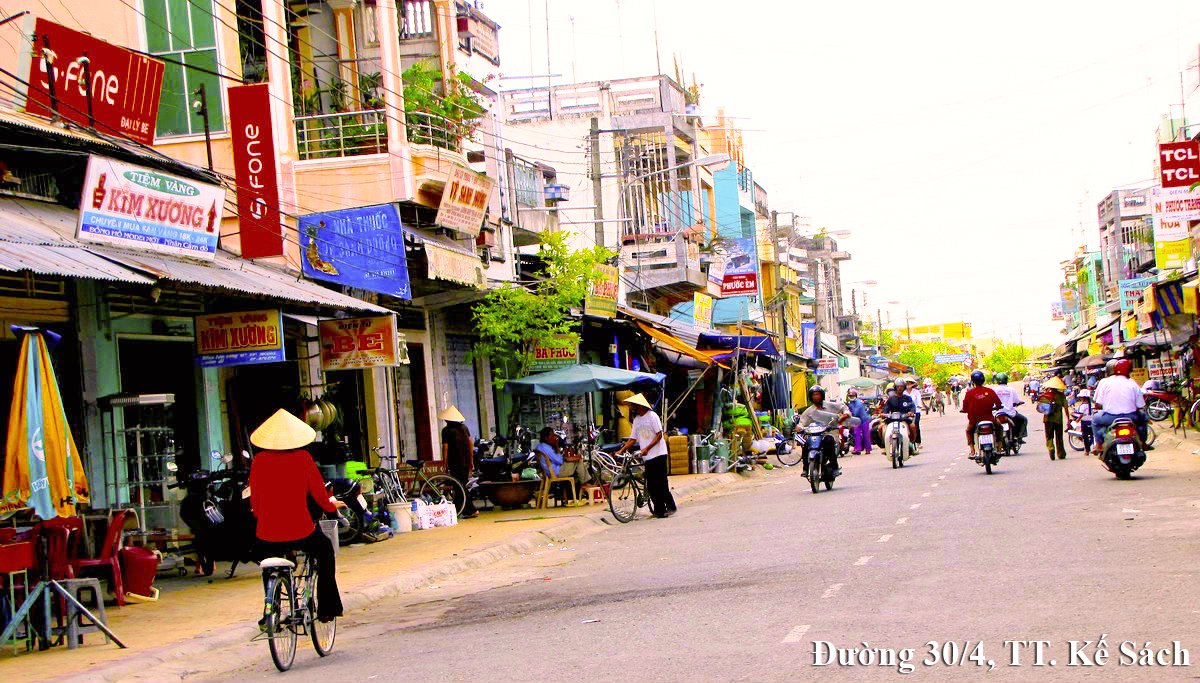
- Street view of Kế Sách District
- Interactive map of Kế Sách district
- Country: Vietnam
- Region: Mekong Delta
- Province: Sóc Trăng
- Capital: Kế Sách

Population (2003)
  - Total: 161,644
- Time zone: UTC+7 (UTC + 7)

Kế Sách is a rural district of Sóc Trăng province in the Mekong River Delta region of Vietnam. As of 2003 the district had a population of 161,644. The district covers an area of 408 km^{2}. The district capital lies at Kế Sách.
