= Luu Huynh =

Lưu Huỳnh (劉皇, born Saigon, 1960) is a Vietnam-born Vietnamese American film director. His family arrived in America when he was 16 years old.

He worked as a director for the Vietnamese diaspora variety show Paris By Night, which is banned in Vietnam. In 1997, a segment he directed accompanying a song by Trịnh Công Sơn generated much controversy among overseas Vietnamese because it allegedly depicted South Vietnam negatively during the Vietnam War.

His 2007 film, The White Silk Dress (Áo lụa Hà Đông) won the Audience Award at the Busan International Film Festival in South Korea, the Kodak Vision award at the Fukuoka Asian Film Festival in Japan, and the highly coveted "Best foreign film" award at the Golden Rooster Awards in China.

The White Silk Dress was officially selected to represent Vietnam at the 80th Academy Awards in the Best Foreign Language Film category.

The Legend is Alive (Huyền thoại bất tử) was released in 2009 and has won six Golden Kite Awards, including a tie for Best Film.

His latest film, In the name of love (Lấy chồng người ta), was nominated for People's choice award in 2012.

== Filmography ==
- 1999 - Đường trần (Passage of Life)
- 2006 - Áo lụa Hà Đông (The White Silk Dress)
- 2009 - Huyền thoại bất tử (The Legend Is Alive)
- 2012 - "lấy chồng người ta" (In the Name of Love)
- 2014 - Hiệp sĩ mù (The blind warrior)
