= Kim Ngọc =

Vietnamese politician

Party secretary of Vinh Phuc province
- In office 1959–1977

Members of the National Assembly
- In office 1960–1964
- Chairman: Trường Chinh

Personal details
- Born: 10 October 1917 Bình Định Commune, Yên Lạc District, Vĩnh Phúc Province, Vietnam
- Died: 26 May 1979 (aged 61) Hanoi, Vietnam
- Political party: Communist Party of Vietnam

Kim Ngọc (1917-1979), born Kim Văn Nguộc, was a Vietnamese politician who served as the Communist party secretary of Vinh Phuc province from 1959 to 1977. He implemented household contracting throughout the province. Although it was successful, Ngoc was criticized by Le Duan for breaking the law. The policy implementation was stopped, and Ngoc had to criticize himself for his "wrong political route".

Ngoc was not rehabilitated until 1995. He was decorated Order of Independence (1995) and the Order of Ho Chi Minh (2009) posthumously.

Bí thư Tỉnh ủy, a Vietnamese television drama, was based on this story.

== See also ==
- Đổi Mới
