= Film Girl Film Festival =

- Location: Milwaukee, WI, United States
- Founded: 2016
- Language: English
- Website: filmgirlfilm.com

The Film Girl Film Festival is an independent film festival which occurs annually in the fall in Milwaukee, WI. The film festival focuses on shorts and features directed by women, although male directors can be considered if their films have a female or female-identifying protagonist as the central character. The film festival began as the Milwaukee Women's Film Festival in 2016 and rebranded as the Film Girl Film Festival in 2017.

The Film Girl Film Festival also puts on events throughout the year, including a 70mm screening of Wonder Woman directed by Patty Jenkins at the Oriental Theatre in Milwaukee.

== History ==
The Film Girl Film Festival was founded by film critic Andrea Thompson. Beginning as the Milwaukee Women's Film Festival, Thompson became inspired when artists in the local community and Hollywood insiders discussed the obstacles and disparate treatment women in the industry continued to face. For its second year, the festival rebranded as the Film Girl Film Festival, and continues to foster partnerships across the worldwide community and the Milwaukee arts scene.

== Awards ==
The festival honors filmmakers with juror and audience awards for Best Feature and Best Shorts, as well as awards for Best Milwaukee/Wisconsin Short and Best Milwaukee/Wisconsin Feature. In 2019, the Best Film Award recipient was the 2019 SXSW winner, The Garden Left Behind, directed by Flavio Alves.
