= Phuoc Sang Films =

Vietnamese film studio

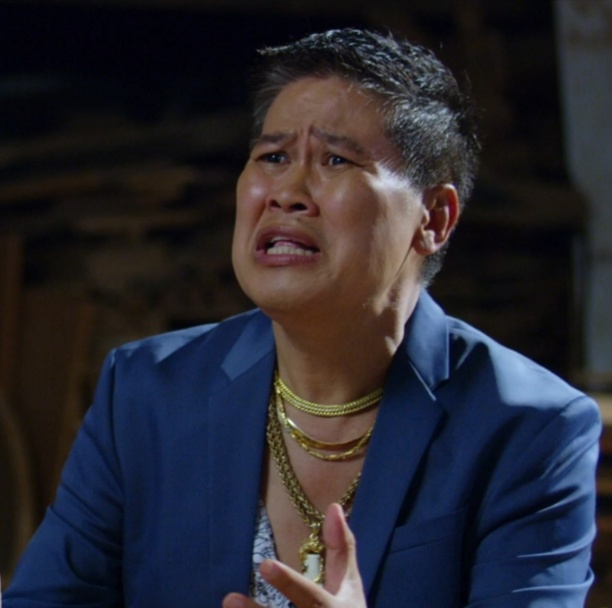
- Company type: private
- Industry: Motion picture
- Founded: 2004
- Headquarters: Ho Chi Minh City, Vietnam
- Key people: Luu Phuoc Sang - president
- Number of employees: 600
- Parent: Phuoc Sang Corp
- Website: hangphim.phuocsang.com

Phuoc Sang Films is a private film studio in Vietnam. It was founded in 2004 by actor Lưu Phước Sang. Some notable motion pictures have been produced under its trademark - including:

- Khi đàn ông có bầu (When Men Get Pregnant) - 2004
- Đẻ mướn (Renting Maternity) - 2005
- Hồn Trương Ba da Hàng thịt
- Áo lụa Hà Đông (The White Silk Dress) - 2006
- Võ lâm truyền kỳ (Swordsman) - 2007 - in collaboration with Thien Ngan Pictures
- Mười - The Legend of a Portrait - 2007 (CJ Entertainment) - Vietnamese production and distribution
- Phát tài (Become Rich) - 2008
- Huyền thoại bất tử (The Immortal Legend) - 2009 - starring Dustin Nguyen
- Đại gia đình
- Công chúa teen và ngũ hổ tướng - 2010
- Lâu Đài Tình Ái - 2011
- Thiên sứ 99 - 2011
- Hello cô Ba - 2012
- Xóm gà - 2012
- Yêu anh ! Em dám không ? - 2013
