= Ghosts in Vietnamese culture =

Ghosts in Vietnamese culture are widely believed to be wandering souls with a significant impact on daily life, closely tied to the cultural practices of ancestor worship. Known by various names such as ma, hồn, vong, and bóng ma, these spirits are thought to take diverse forms and exhibit both positive and negative characteristics. Ghosts often include individuals who suffered unnatural or violent deaths, especially those who died away from home. Proper rituals, burials and offerings are believed to transform souls into ancestors who bring prosperity to their families. Those lacking these rituals become "hungry ghosts," viewed as supernatural thieves wandering the countryside. Ghost stories, or "chuyện ma," are prevalent in Vietnamese culture, and these spirits are believed to influence fortune-tellers and spirit mediums. The belief in ghosts has societal implications, particularly in addressing missing soldiers from the Vietnam War. While families use spirit mediums to locate their loved ones, the Communist government considered ghost beliefs culturally backward, discouraging related media stories and commemoration rituals. Practices to deal with ghosts involve burning incense, offering prayers, and making offerings to prevent interference, with rituals led by specialists to make ghosts leave.

== Terminology ==
Ghosts in Vietnam are known by the following names: ma, hồn, vong, hồn ma, bóng ma, linh hồn, vong hồn, oan hồn, bách linh, yêu quái.

== Vietnamese beliefs in ghosts ==
Ghosts in Vietnam are known to take on many forms and do not fit into one category. They can be "pleasant and feared, harmless and dangerous, moral creatures and unhappy suicides, male and female, human and un-human". It is generally understood that certain ghosts are people who have undergone unnatural, premature, painful or violent deaths, and especially when people die away from home. This differs from the understanding of ancestors who would have died a good death in their homes with the proper rituals in place. The souls in Vietnam are understood to need certain items in the afterlife in order to function, just like the living. These include offerings of paper money, food, clothing, shoes, a house, a bicycle Souls that receive the proper rituals, are buried in a good location with a proper tombstone, and have their tablet installed on the family's ancestor altar will become ancestors, will be nourished by the family, and will reciprocate by continuing to help the family and its members prosper. Those who don't receive these proper burials will become ghosts, what is referred to as "hồn ma" or "ghost souls", and are doomed to roam the world due to unfinished business or due to some unresolved emotions. Spirits of those who lived immoral lives or died under unhappy circumstances are thought to roam the countryside in hoards stealing what they can along the way. In this sense, they are seen as the supernatural equivalent of robbers. They are, therefore, also called "hungry ghosts" (ma đói). These spirits are described as malformed humanoid creatures, possessing excessively distended bellies, tiny mouths, and suffer from an insatiable hunger.

There are many ghost stories, "chuyện ma", which relate to the manner in which ghosts haunt the people of Vietnam. Ghosts are present in turns in the roads where car accidents occur on a regular basis. There is a general understanding that it is at these places that ghosts pop out in front of the cars causing them to go off the road or hit oncoming cars.

Ghosts are also viewed as aids to fortune-tellers and spirit mediums because they help them to gain an understanding about people's lives. Vietnamese will visit spirit mediums and fortune tellers in order to gain insight into their finances or love life. Spirit Mediums also aid in the locating dead relatives who have not received proper burials.

The beliefs in ghosts have affected how the Vietnamese deal with MIA soldiers. The Vietnam War caused many soldiers not to return home, as well as not receiving proper burials in their home communities. The graves of the unknown mark the landscape of Vietnam and can be found on footpaths, in family gardens and in fields. Many remain unmarked. As a result, ghosts of the soldiers are said to wander these areas. There is now a great desire to discover where the remains of the deceased are located and to bring them home to their villages for reburial.

However, the Communist government of Vietnam views beliefs in ghosts as culturally backward and morally lax. Ghost stories in the media and commemoration rituals are discouraged.

== Practices ==
Spirit mediums will be used by families looking for their loved ones as well as ghosts looking for their families. There is a strong desire to find missing people; so that they may have a good resting place where the family can make offerings to the deceased. There is an idea that ghosts and their families cannot be at peace with the person's death until they are found and have a proper burial and grave. For example, when bodies of soldiers are found, they are exhumed, and reburied in their home communities. Often there are formal military funerals where the soldiers are given full military honour, as they are considered martyrs.

One of the most common rituals/practices for dealing with ghosts is to burn incense and offer prayers. This is done for the various unknown ghosts who have been seen or are thought to be buried in the area. This would happen whenever a villager passed by the locations of ghost sightings. Although this is one of the most common rituals for dealing with ghost, it is not always effective. Another methods for dealing with a ghost is to bring in a ritual specialist recite incantations, cau chu, in order to make the ghost leave.

Before many rituals offerings of sticky rice will be made to hungry ghosts to prevent them from interfering. This practice of making offerings to hungry ghosts is also common at funerals, so that the offerings are not stolen by ghosts.

== See also ==
- Chinese ghost
- Gwisin
- Muoi: The Legend of a Portrait (film)
- Onryō
- Vengeful ghost
