= Vietnamese family life =

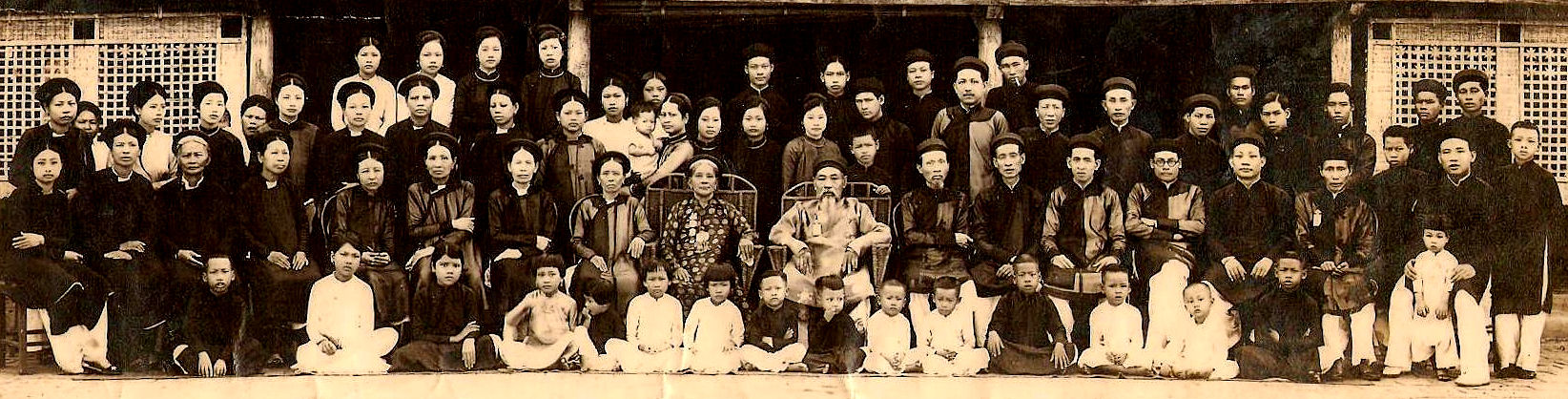
Cao Xuân Tiếu's extended family in 1934

Traditionally, Vietnamese family has a kinship system and abided by the concepts of filial piety. However, these are often regarded as old wisdoms and traditions of Vietnamese culture rather than enacted policies.

== Kinship system ==
Traditionally the head of the Vietnamese family (Vietnamese: gia đình) was the husband, often named gia trưởng. Many families which have the same origin compose a "line of the blood", called đại gia đình or gia tộc or họ. The head of a đại gia đình was the man who is at the highest status in the đại gia đình, named tộc trưởng. According to the Vietnamese creation myth, all Vietnamese people descend from two progenitors Lạc Long Quân and Âu Cơ.

Nine generations (Vietnamese: thế hệ or đời) are recognized in terms, including:

Kỵ (Kỵ ông/ Kỵ bà): my great-grandparents' parents (my great-grandparents' father/mother)

Cụ (Cụ ông/ Cụ bà): my great-grandparents (my great-grandfather/great grandmother)

Ông bà: my grandparents (my grandfather/grandmother)

Cha Mẹ: my parents (father/mother)

Ta/Tôi: I

Con (Con trai/Con gái): my children (my son/daughter)

Cháu (Cháu trai/Cháu gái): my grandchildren (my grandson/granddaughter)

Chắt (Chắt trai/chắt gái): my great-grandchildren My great-grandson/great-granddaughter)

Chút (or Chít)(Chút trai/Chút gái): my great-grandchildren's children (my great-grandchildren's son/daughter)

Usually, there are three generations are in co-residence, called tam đại đồng đường.

Horizontally, there are brothers/sisters that share our same parent, named anh chị em ruột and cousins who share the same grandparents, named anh chị em họ. The adopted brothers/sisters are anh chị em nuôi. The half-brother/sisters who share the same father, but different mothers are anh chị em dị bào and the half-brothers/sisters who share the same mother, but different fathers are anh chị em đồng mẫu dị phụ. The husband of the sisters are anh/em rể and the wife of the brothers are chị/em dâu. The brothers/sisters of the husband are anh chị em chồng and the brothers/sisters of our wife are anh chị em vợ. Two men whose wives are sisters are anh em cọc chèo and two women whose husbands are brothers are chị em dâu.

== Parents ==
There are multiple terms for fathers and mothers depending on their status relative to the family. Traditionally, there are three terms for fathers (Vietnamese: tam phụ) and eight terms for mothers (Vietnamese: bát mẫu).

=== Tam phụ ===
Thân phụ: blood-father.

Giá phụ or cha dượng or cha ghẻ: mother's present husband

Dưỡng phụ: adopted father.

=== Bát mẫu ===
Đích mẫu: father's official first wife

Kế mẫu: father's wife, replacing the position of official first wife after death

Từ mẫu: adopted mother, belonging to family

Dưỡng mẫu: adopted mother, does not belong to family

Thứ mẫu: blood-mother, official non-first wife

Giá mẫu: blood-mother remarried after blood-father died

Xuất mẫu: blooded mother divorced or separated from our blood-father

Nhũ mẫu: wetnurse (i.e. an unrelated woman who breastfed them)

The principle named đạo hiếu is the same concept as filial piety.

== Marriage ==
An engagement ceremony usually takes place half a year or so before the wedding. In the past, most marriages (Vietnamese: hôn nhân) were arranged by the parents or extended family, and while children were sometimes consulted, it was nearly always the parents' final decision. It was not unusual for the bride and groom to meet for the first time at the day of their engagement. However, in the last few decades, Vietnamese women and men marry based on love rather than arranged marriages. This level of freedom is attributed to the influence of the Western cultures beginning from the French.

== Personal pronoun ==
Vietnamese personal pronouns are formed according to the position of the speakers and listeners in their families.

== See also ==
- Culture of Vietnam
