= Triệu Phong =

- Commune
- Interactive map of Triệu Phong
- Coordinates: 16.769766535309724°N 107.16554757716179°E
- Country: Vietnam
- Region: North Central Coast
- Province: Quảng Trị
- Established: 16 June 2025

Area
  - Total: 80.79 km^{2} (31.19 sq mi)

Population (31 December 2024)
  - Total: 23,534
  - Density: 291/km^{2} (750/sq mi)

Triệu Phong is a commune in Quảng Trị province, Vietnam.

On 16 June 2025, the Standing Committee of the National Assembly of Vietnam issued Resolution No. 1680/NQ-UBTVQH15 on the arrangement of commune-level administrative units in Quảng Trị province in 2025. Under the resolution, the entire area and population of Ái Tử township, Triệu Thành commune, and Triệu Thượng commune, all formerly part of Triệu Phong district, were merged to form a new commune named Triệu Phong.
