= Văn Chung =

Vietnamese singer-songwriter

Mai Văn Chung, stagename Văn Chung, (Hải Dương, 1914-1984) was a Vietnamese singer-songwriter. He was a posthumous recipient of the Hồ Chí Minh Prize in 2007.
