= Hoàng Trọng =

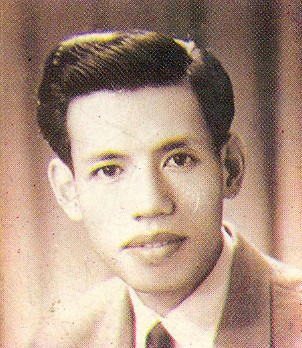
- Hoàng Trọng in 1973

Background information
- Birth name: Hoàng Trung Trọng
- Born: 1922; Hải Dương, Vietnam
- Died: 1998 (aged 75–76); United States
- Genres: Pre-Vietnam War music (vi:Nhạc tiền chiến)

Hoàng Trung Trọng (1922 in Hải Dương – 16 July 1998 in United States) was a Vietnamese songwriter.
