= Hoàng Thi Thơ =

Vietnamese songwriter

- Born: July 1, 1929; Triệu Phong, Vietnam
- Died: September 23, 2001 (aged 72) Glendale, California
- Genres: Jazz

Hoàng Thi Thơ (Triệu Phong, Vietnam, 1 July 1929 - Glendale, California, United States, 23 September 2001) was a Vietnamese songwriter popular in the 1950s and '60s. He was part of the musical diaspora which emigrated to Orange County, California.
