= Văn Phụng =

Vietnamese songwriter (1930–1999)

- Born: Nguyễn Văn Phụng; 1930; Hanoi, French Indochina
- Died: 17 December 1999 (aged 68–69) Vienna, Virginia, U.S.
- Genres: Jazz
- Occupations: songwriter
- Spouse: Châu Hà

Văn Phụng (Hanoi, 1930–17 December 1999) was a Vietnamese songwriter. His wife is the singer Châu Hà.

== Works ==
- Ave Maria
- Bên lưng đèo
- Bóng người đi
- Bức họa đồng quê
- Các anh đi
- Chán nản
- Chung thủy
- Đêm buồn
- Điệp khúc thanh bình
- Dịu dàng
- Em mới biết yêu đã biết sầu
- Ghé bến Sài Gòn
- Giã từ đêm mưa
- Giấc mộng viễn du
- Giang hồ
- Hát lên nào
- Hết đêm nay mai sẽ hay
- Hình ảnh một đêm trăng
- Hoài vọng
- Hôn nhau lần cuối
- Lãng tử
- Lối cũ
- Lời nhi nữ
- Mộng hải hồ
- Một lần cuối
- Mộng viễn du
- Mưa
- Mưa rơi thánh thót
- Mưa trên phím ngà
- Nhớ bến Đà Giang
- Nỗi buồn
- Ô! Mê ly
- Sóng vàng trên vịnh Nha Trang
- Spring of hair guitar solo piece
- Suối tóc
- Sương thu
- Ta vui ca vang
- Thuyền xưa bến cũ
- Tiếng dương cầm
- Tiếng hát đường xa
- Tiếng hát với cung đàn
- Tiếng vang trên đồi
- Tiếng vọng chiều vàng
- Tình
- Tôi đi giữa hoàng hôn
- Trăng gió ngoài khơi
- Trăng sáng vườn chè
- Trăng sơn cước
- Trở về cố đô
- Trở về Huế
- Trong đêm vắng
- Viết trên tà áo Em
- Vó câu muôn dặm
- Vui bên ánh lửa
- Vui đời nghệ sĩ
- Xuân họp mặt
- Xuân miền Nam
- Xuân thôn giã
- Xuân về trên non sông Việt Nam
- Yêu
