= Thành Được =

Vietnamese actor and singer (1934–2023)

Thành Được 成達
- Born: Châu Văn Được; 8 August 1934; Nhơn Mỹ Commune, Kế Sách District, Sóc Trăng Province, Cochinchina, French Indochina
- Died: 16 November 2023 (aged 89)
- Occupation(s): Actor, singer, businessman
- Years active: 1940s–2023
- Spouse: Út Bạch Lan (1961–64)
- Children: 4

Meritorious Artist Thành Được (chữ Hán: 成達, 8 August 1934 – 16 November 2023) was a Vietnamese actor and singer.

== Biography ==
Thành Được was born as Châu Văn Được (周文達) ơn 8 August 1934 at Nhơn Mỹ Commune, Kế Sách District, Sóc Trăng Province, French Cochinchina. He died on 16 November 2023, at the age of 89.

== Career ==
=== Classical music ===
- Lưu Bình – Dương Lễ
- Love story of An Lộc Sơn
- Cali chiều khóc bạn
- Cao Tiệm Ly tiễn Kinh Kha
- Chiều lạc lõng
- Đêm lạnh trong tù
- Lâu đài tình ái
- Lỗi nhịp cầu ô
- Nàng là ai
- Ngăn cách
- Người phu quét lá sân trường
- Nụ cười xuân
- Tà áo cưới
- Giã từ sân khấu
- Mưa rừng
- Tan vỡ mộng trăm năm
- 20 năm làm thân viễn xứ
- Vợ tôi đi lấy chồng

=== Opera ===
- Chương (trong vở Ngôi nhà Ma)
- Diệp Băng Đình (Thuyền ra cửa biển)
- Dương Thiết Tâm (Anh hùng xạ điêu)
- Tang Xuanzong (Love story of An Lộc Sơn)
- Dũng (Đoạn Tuyệt)
- Hiếu (Bông hồng cài áo)
- Lĩnh Nam (Sân khấu về khuya)
- Phi (Nắng sớm mưa chiều)
- Võ Minh Thành (Life of lady Lựu)
- Thi Đằng (Tiếng hạc trong trăng)
- Tô Điền Sơn (Khi hoa Anh Đào nở)
- Tùng (trong vở Nửa đời hương phấn)
- Văn (trong vở Con gái chị Hằng)
- White shirt of lady Mộng Trinh
- Bên đồi trăng cũ
- Bọt biển
- Cầu sương thiếp phụ chàng
- Chưa tắt lửa lòng
- Chuyện tình 17
- Đợi anh mùa lá rụng
- Giấc mộng giữa Hoàng lăng
- Khói sóng tiêu tương
- Nữa bản tình ca
- The beauty in Baghdad
- Rồi 30 năm sau
- Tấm lòng của biển
- Tình xuân muôn tuổi

=== Film ===
- Shadow on the road (1973)

== Honor ==
- Golden medal of Thanh Tâm Award in 1966 with character Thi-Đằng the Robbery of drama Crane's voice at the moonlight.
