= Thẩm Thúy Hằng =

Vietnamese actress (1940–2022)

Merited Artist Thẩm Thúy Hằng
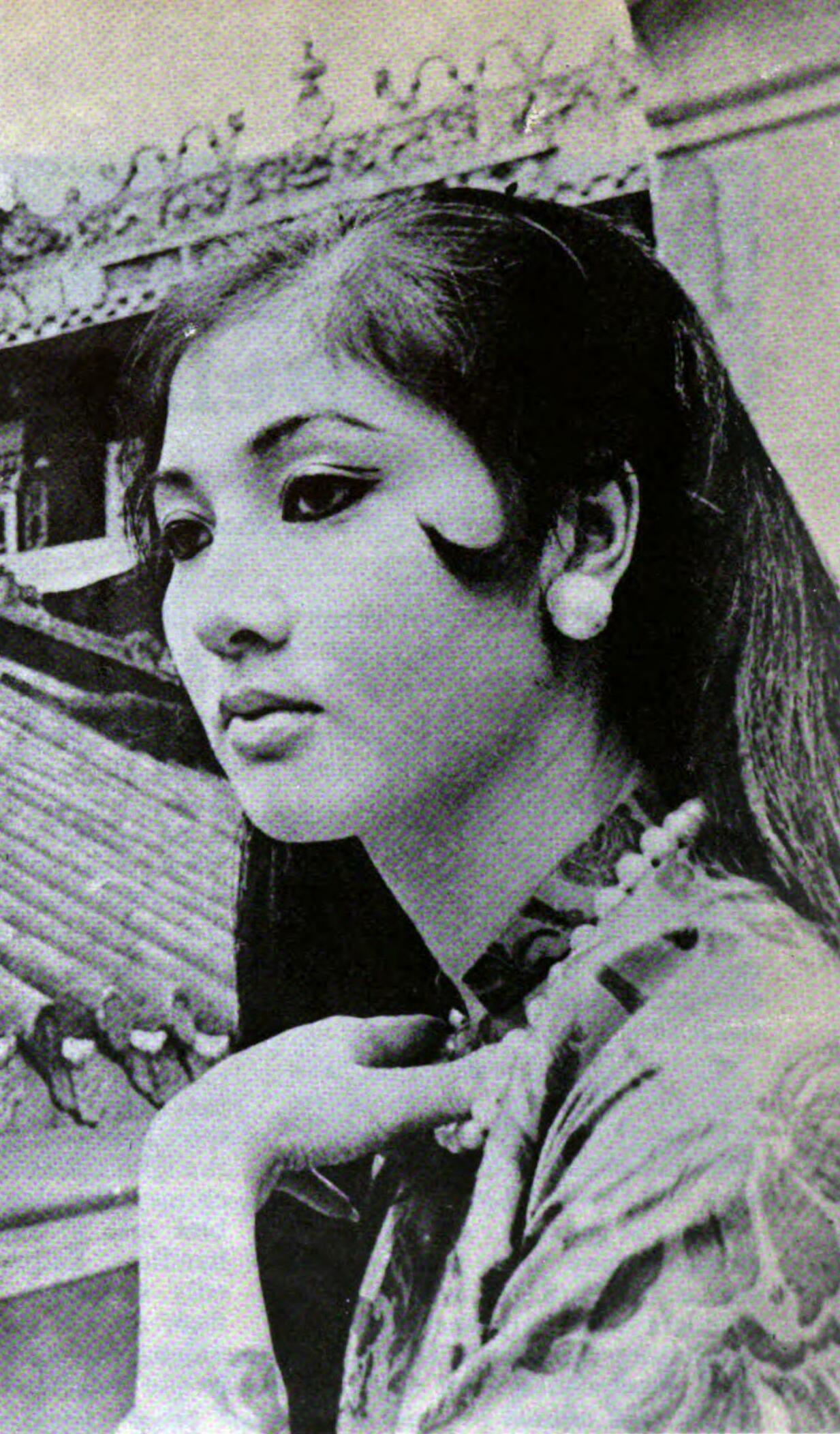
- Portrait of Thẩm Thúy Hằng in 1966
- Born: Nguyễn Kim Phụng; 6 October 1939; Haiphong, French Indochina
- Died: 6 September 2022 (aged 82); Ho Chi Minh City, Vietnam
- Other name: The Beauty of Binh Duong
- Citizenship: Vietnam
- Occupations: Actress; scriptwriter
- Years active: 1958–1980
- Spouse: Nguyễn Xuân Oánh (1970–2003, his death)
- Children: Nguyen Xuan Ai Quoc, Nguyen Xuan Quoc Viet, Nguyen Thuy Thi Hang, & Nguyen Xuan Dung

Thẩm Thúy Hằng (6 October 1939 – 6 September 2022) was a Vietnamese actress. During the 1950s and 1960s, she was a star of the film industry in South Vietnam. She had starred in movies, some of which were co-produced with companies from the United States, the Philippines, Thailand, Hong Kong, Taiwan, and Japan.

Thẩm Thúy Hằng's birth name was Nguyễn Kim Phụng and her Christian name was Jeane.

Hằng's first film role was Tam Nuong in The Beauty of Binh Duong, directed by Năm Châu in 1958. She co-starred with actor Nguyễn Đình Dần.

She died at home on 6 September 2022, at the age of 82.
