= Stjärnornas stjärna =

- Country of origin: Sweden
- Original language: Swedish

Production
- Production company: Baluba AB

Original release
- Network: TV 4 Sweden
- Release: 17 March 2018

Stjärnornas stjärna was a Swedish TV-series based on the Norwegian Stjernekamp-format, which was being broadcast on TV4 in three seasons 2018 – 2020. Host was Petra Mede. In the series eight professional singers competed in different music genres and every week one of the singers got voted off the series until one was the winner. The winner of the first season was Casper Janebrink.

== Singers (Season 1) ==
List of competing singers for the first season.

- Casper Janebrink Winner
- Ola Salo 2nd
- LaGaylia Frazier 3rd
- Tommy Nilsson 4th
- Wiktoria 5th
- Roger Pontare 6th
- Linda Pira 7th
- Ace Wilder 8th

== Singers (Season 2) ==
List of competing singers for the second season.

- Andreas Weise Winner
- Mariette 2nd
- Peter Larsson 3rd
- Renaida 4th
- Jakob Samuel 5th
- Plura 6th
- Andreas Lundstedt 7th
- Shirley Clamp 8th

== Singers (Season 3) ==
List of competing singers for the third season.

- David Lindgren Winner
- Jon Henrik Fjällgren 2nd
- Elisa Lindström 3rd
- Jessica Andersson 4th
- Mapei 5th
- Nicke Borg 6th
- Nano 7th
- Amwin 8th

== International versions ==
Country/Region	Local title	Network	Hosts	Judges	Winner
Estonia	Tähtede täht	Kanal 2	Jüri Butšakov (1-present)	Lenna Kuurmaa (1-present); Mihkel Raud (1-present); Andrei Zevakin (1-present)	Season 1, 2023: Getter Jaani; Season 2, 2024: Ott Lepland
Finland	Tähdet, tähdet	MTV3 (2014-2019); Nelonen (2020–present)	Mikko Leppilampi (1-5); Heikki Paasonen (6); Susanna Laine (7-present)	Juhani Merimaa (1-5); Maria Veitola (1-5); Izmo Heikkilä (5); Anni Hautala (6); Mikko Kuustonen (6); Sami Yaffa (7-present); Juuso Mäkilähde (7-present); Lilli Paasikivi (7-present)	Season 1, 2014: Jari Sillanpää; Season 2, 2015: Waltteri Torikka; Season 3, 2016: Pete Parkkonen; Season 4, 2017: Elias Kaskinen; Season 5, 2019: Jussi Rainio; Season 6, 2020: Konsta Hietanen; Season 7, 2023: Maria Lund; Season 8, 2024: Hanna Kinnunen; Season 9, 2025: Upcoming season
Norway	Stjernekamp	NRK1	Kåre Magnus Bergh (1-11); Staysman (12-present)	Mona B. Riise (1-10); Ole Evenrud (1); Øyvind Sauvik (2); Thomas Felberg (3-8); Christine Dancke (11-present); Kristoffer Olsen (12-present)	Season 1, 2012: Rita Eriksen; Season 2, 2013: Silya Nymoen; Season 3, 2014: Nora Foss Al-Jabri; Season 4, 2015: Maria Haukaas Mittet; Season 5, 2016: Knut Anders Sørum; Season 6, 2017: Adam Douglas; Season 7, 2018: Ella Marie Hætta isaksen; Season 8, 2019: Bilal Saab; Season 9, 2020: Knut Marius Djupvik; Season 10, 2021: Bjørn Tomren; Season 11, 2023: Odd René Andersen; Season 12, 2025: Upcoming season
Poland	Superstarcie	TVP2	Marika (1); Antoni Królikowski (1)	Wojciech Mann (1); Various guest judges (1)	Season 1, 2014: Natasza Urbańska
Russia	Универсальный артист	Channel One Russia (1)	Yana Churikova (1)	Various guest judges (1)	Season 1, 2014: Larisa Dolina
Sweden	Stjärnornas stjärna	TV4	Petra Mede (1-3)	Jan Gradvall (1-3); Zannah Hultén (1); Kishti Tomita (2-3)	Season 1, 2018: Casper Janebrink; Season 2, 2019: Andreas Weise; Season 3, 2020: David Lindgren
Vietnam	Tuyệt đỉnh tranh tài	HTV	Huỳnh Trấn Thành (1-present)	Lê Hoàng (1)	Season 1, 2014: Phương Vy; Season 2, 2015: Nguyễn Hoàng Tôn
