= All Included =

Compilation album by Arvingarna
- Released: 25 April 2007
- Recorded: 1992–2007
- Genre: modern dansband music
- Label: Mariann Grammofon
- Producer: Gert Lengstrand

Arvingarna chronology
#8 (2007)	All Included (2007)	Rockin' Around the Christmas Tree (2007)

All Included is an Arvingarna compilation album, originally supposed to be released on 18 April 2007 before the release was postponed one week, to 25 April 2007.

== Track listing ==
1. Skenet bedrar
2. Sandras sång
3. Nån däruppe har koll på dej
4. Bara du vill
5. Leva lycklig
6. Du är allt jag drömt
7. Jeannie
8. Va hon inte vet
9. Himlen måste gråta (Heaven must cry)
10. Ring om du vill nånting
11. Tro mig
12. Min Amazon
13. Det borde vara jag
14. Kung i stan
15. Än finns det kärlek
16. En dag i taget
17. Bo Diddley
18. Det svär jag på
19. Till en öde ö
20. Det kan inget ändra på
21. I gult och blått
22. Eloise
23. Pamela
24. Natt efter natt
25. Sjunde himlen
26. Sommar och solvarma dar
27. En 68 (A Cabriolet)
28. Angelina
29. Coola killar
30. Twiilight
31. Månsken över Heden
32. Om dessa väggar kunde tala
33. Magdalena
34. De ensammas promenad
35. Superstar
36. Det regnar i mitt hjärta
37. Gud vad hon är läcker
38. Hela vägen hem
39. Du fick mig att öppna mina ögon
40. Räck mig din hand
41. Hon kommer med sommaren
42. Rakt in i hjärtat

== Charts ==
Chart (2007)	Peak position
Sweden (Sverigetopplistan)	26
