= Bara 15 år =

Song by Jigs

from the album Goa bitar 4
- Language: Swedish
- Released: 1974
- Genre: dansband music
- Label: Mariann
- Composer: Rune Wallebom
- Lyricist: Gert Lengstrand
- Producers: Bert Karlsson, Lars Karlsson

"Bara 15 år" is a song written by Gert Lengstrand and Rune Wallebom, and recorded in 1974 by Jigs on the album Goa bitar 4, by the Streaplers on the album Lady Banana and the Drifters on the album I kväll and Jan-Inges on the album Tusentals sköna toner. Their version was also released as a single the same year, with Har du saknat mig ibland acting as a B-side.

The Streaplers version charted at Svensktoppen for 11 weeks between 27 October 1974-5 January 1975. and even topped the chart.

In 2007, the song was recorded by Larz-Kristerz on the album Stuffparty 3, and by Arvingarna on the album Underbart 2009.
