= Eloise (album) =

1993 studio album by Arvingarna

Studio album by Arvingarna
- Released: May 1993
- Genre: Dansband
- Label: Big Bag

Arvingarna chronology
Coola killar (1992)	Eloise (1993)	Tjejer (1994)

Singles from Eloise
- 1. "Angelina" Released: 1993; 2. "Eloise" Released: 1993

Eloise is the second studio album by Swedish "dansband" Arvingarna, released in 1993. From the album, Arvingarna scored two Svensktoppen hit songs, "Eloise" and "Angelina", both 1993. The album also charted at number seven on the Swedish Albums Chart.

== Track listing ==
1. Eloise
2. En sommar med dig
3. Vad hon inte vet
4. Sea of Love
5. Angelina
6. Det e bara jag
7. ...och hon sa
8. Wasted Days and Wasted Nights
9. Samma ensamma jag
10. Då blir det rock'n roll
11. Himlen måste gråta
12. Mayday SOS
13. Kom till mig
14. Min Amazon

== Charts ==
Weekly chart performance for Eloise
Chart (1993)	Peak position
Swedish Albums (Sverigetopplistan)	7
