= I Do (Arvingarna song) =

Single by Arvingarna
- Released: February 23, 2019
- Genre: Pop
- Label: Sony Music
- Songwriter(s): Nanne Grönvall; Casper Janebrink; Thomas “Plec” Johansson; Mikael Karlsson
- Producer(s): Thomas “Plec” Johansson

"I Do" is a song by Swedish band Arvingarna. The song was performed for the first time in Melodifestivalen 2019, where it made it to the final, and it ended up in seventh place in the contest. This was Arvingarna's first Melodifestivalen entry since 2002. The song charted at number six on the Swedish singles chart and was subsequently certified platinum in the country.

== Charts ==
=== Weekly charts ===
Chart (2019)	Peak position
Sweden (Sverigetopplistan)	6

=== Year-end charts ===
Chart (2019)	Position
Sweden (Sverigetopplistan)	85

== Certifications ==
Region	Certification	Certified units/sales
Sweden (GLF)	Platinum	8,000,000^{†}
^{†} Streaming-only figures based on certification alone.
