= Då & nu =

Compilation album by Arvingarna
- Released: October 1996
- Recorded: 1991–1996
- Genre: Dansband music

Arvingarna chronology
| För alltid (1995) | Då & nu (1996) | Nya spår (1997) |

Då & nu is a compilation album by Swedish dansband Arvingarna, released in 1996.

== Track listing ==
1. En 68:a cabriolet
2. Nattens sista spårvagn
3. Varför blir det inte alltid som man vill
4. Tänk om jag hade ett flygplan
5. Glasslåten
6. Sången till Jennifer
7. Natt efter natt
8. Granna Anna
9. Linda går
10. Eloise
11. Coola killar
12. Räck mig din hand
13. Jeannie
14. Bo Diddley
15. Det borde vara jag
16. Månsken över heden
17. ...och hon sa
18. Du och jag
19. Tjejer
20. Angelina
21. Än finns det kärlek

== Charts ==
| Chart (1996) | Peak position |
|---|---|
| Sweden (Sverigetopplistan) | 38 |
