= List of VTV dramas broadcast in 2001 =

This is a list of VTV dramas released in 2001.

←2000 - 2001 - 2002→

== VTV Tet dramas ==
These films were released on VTV channels during Tet holiday.

Broadcast	Title	Eps.	Prod.	Cast and crew	Theme song(s)	Genre	Notes
23 Jan	Thung lũng mây mù (Misty Valley)	1	VTV Film Prod.	Mạc Văn Chung (director)		Drama	Airs 20:50, 29th Tet holiday on VTV1
24 Jan	Nghệ sĩ giải hạn (The Artist Who Repels Bad Luck)	1 (77′)	VTV Film Prod.	Nguyễn Anh Tuấn (director); Phạm Văn Khôi (writer); Phạm Bằng, Minh Tuấn, Nguyệt Hằng, Tuấn Dương, Quang Thắng, Hồ Liên, Bá Cường, Mai Phương, Ngọc Thoa...		Comedy, Drama	Airs 12:05, 1st Tet holiday on VTV3
24 Jan	Lộc xuân (Spring Buds)	1	VTV Film Prod.			Drama	Airs 21:50, 1st Tet holiday on VTV3
25 Jan	Không phải trò đùa (Not a Joke)	1 (80′)	VTV Film Prod.	Vũ Minh Trí (director); Nguyễn Quyến (writer); Hồng Giang, Quốc Khánh, Minh Hằng, Văn Hiệp, Minh Tuấn, Anh Quân, Minh Hiếu, Văn Khánh, Bích Thủy, Mỹ Duyên, Hồng Điệp, Lan Minh, Lê Đức, Mạnh Trường, Hồng Loan, Mai Trang...		Family, Comedy, Rural	Airs 19:50, 2nd Tet holiday on VTV3
26 Jan	Ti-vi về làng (TV to the Village)	1 (70′)	Feature Film Studio I	Đặng Tất Bình (director); Bùi Thạc Chuyên (writer); Phú Đôn, Công Lý, Đình Chiến, Duy Hậu, Bích Hạnh, Bích Thủy, Minh Hòa, Xuân Thức...		Rural, Comedy	Airs 21:15, 3rd Tet holiday on VTV1

== VTV1 Friday - Wednesday + Sunday - Monday night dramas ==
- Note: Unlisted airtime periods were spent for special events.

=== Friday night dramas ===
Following up the previous year, Friday night time slot was for Vietnamese dramas while Monday + Tuesday + Thursday night and Wednesday + Sunday night time slot were for foreign dramas.

These dramas air on every Friday night from 21:00 to 22:00 on VTV1.

Broadcast	Title	Eps.	Prod.	Cast and crew	Theme song(s)	Genre	Notes
12 Jan	Followed by the playback of Con Vá (Vá, My Puppy) . The single-episode drama was produced and first released on THP channel in 2000.						
19 Jan	Followed by the playback of Những con đường (Roads) . The single-episode drama was produced and first released on BGTV channel in 2000.						
2 Feb	Followed by the playback of Gió quê (Country Wind) . The single-episode drama was produced and first released on THP channel in 2000.						
9 Feb	Đôi dòng (Two Lines)	1	VTV Film Prod.	Vũ Trường Khoa (director); Xuân Khang (writer); Huyền Thanh, Trần Hạnh, Như Hiền, Trần Thạch, Tuấn Quang, Mỹ Duyên, Vĩnh Xương, Văn Hòa, Mai Liên, Nam Cường, Thanh Hoa, Anh Quân, Thanh Hòa, Vân Anh, Hoàng Tùng, Xuân Vinh, Ngọc Hoán, Qùy Hòa, Hoàng Diệp, Văn Đức...		Drama, Old-fashioned, Musical	
16-23 Feb	Đôi bờ (Both Sides of the River)	2 (70′)	TĐN	Lê Ngọc Linh (director); Bành Mai Phương (writer); Như Quỳnh, Minh Hiệp, Hoa Thúy, Hùng Khanh, Thu Hương, Tùng Dương, Trần Hồng, Nhật Quang, Lê Thành...		Drama	
19 Jan	Followed by the playback of Đạo nhà (Filial) . The single-episode drama was produced and first released on TRT channel in 2000.						
7 & 9 Mar; Wed-Fri	Nỗi niềm với biển (Talk to Sea)	2 (80′)	VTV Center in HCMC	Trần Quang Minh (director); Nguyễn Mạnh Tuấn (writer); Kim Thanh, Hoàng Thơ, Quang Mẫn, Tạ Nghi Lễ, Nguyễn Liêm, Khánh Hùng, Phương Hiền, Tuấn Khiêm...		Drama	
16-23 Mar	Khát vọng tình yêu (Desire for Love)	2				Drama, Romance	
30 Mar-25 May	Chiều tàn thu muộn (Sun Down, Late Fall)	9	VTV Film Prod	Phạm Thanh Phong, Vũ Trường Khoa (directors); Phạm Gia Thanh (writer); Duy Hậu, Ngọc Tản, Minh Châu, Quốc Tuấn, Huệ Anh, Trần Tiến, Mạnh Tuấn, Phạm Cường, Thu Quế, Trọng Trinh, Mỹ Linh, Hương Trà, Hữu Độ, Vân Anh, Lan Minh, Huyền Trang, Thành An, Kim Hoàn, Minh Tâm, Tuấn Dũng, Thanh Huyền, Tùng Lâm, Cẩm Anh, Hà Vy...	'Chiều tàn thu muộn' theme song	Drama, Family	
8-22 Jun	Bến nước ... Đời người (The Wharf, The Human Life)	3 (70′)	VTV Film Prod.	Trần Phương (director); Nguyễn Xuân Hải (writer); Việt Trinh, Phạm Cường, Yến Vy, Ngọc Thoa, Quốc Tuấn, Thu Hạnh, Xuân Thức, Xuân Mai, Minh Tuấn, Ngọc Thư, Hồng Điệp, Hồng Nhung, Lân Bích, Đức Long, Thùy Hương, Đức Mẫn, Phạm Hoàng, Hạnh Nguyên, Nam Cường, Ngọc Bảo, Lan Hoàn, Hằng Nga, Xuân Hải, Minh Thông, Văn Thành...	Bến sông xưa (The Wharf That Year) by Nông Xuân Ái	Rural, Drama, Post-war, Romance	
29 Jun	Miền sáng (The Bright Domain)	1	VTV Film Prod.	Trung Anh, Thu Hương, Thu Phương...	Genki Bakuhatsu Ganbaruger by yoshiko	Drama, Rural, Family	
6 Jul	Hai bến một dòng sông (Two Wharfs, One River)	1	VTV Film Prod.	Nguyễn Danh Dũng (director); Đình Thành, Hoàng Nhung (writers); Huy Công, Hà Hương, Tiến Dũng, Thúy Vi, Hải Điệp, Ngọc Tản, Hồng Giang, Mai Hòa, Lê Tuấn, Hồ Lan, Thanh Phong, Quốc Thắng...		Rural, Drama, Romance	Based on Nguyễn Hiếu's short story 'Làng yên ả bên sông'
13 Jul	Đuốc sáng rừng đêm (The Torch Lights Up The Dark Forest)	1 (80′)	VTV Film Prod.	Nguyễn Hữu Phần (director); Nguyễn Thế Kỷ (writer); Phạm Hồng Minh, Nguyễn Mỹ Duyên, Hoàng Hải, Đinh Y Nhung, Lê Thành, Đinh Đình Thông, Nguyễn Văn Long, Bùi Mạnh Cường, Trần Hà Thanh, Đinh Đại Nghĩa...	'Đuốc sáng rừng đêm' theme song by Mỹ Linh	Drama, Ethnic	
20 & 29 Jul; Fri/Sun	Muôn nẻo đường đời (All the Ways in Life)	2	VTV Film Prod.	Vũ Minh Trí (director); Đặng Huy Quyển (writer); Thu Nga, Tạ Ngọc Bảo, Thành An, Quách Thu Phương, Trần Thạch, Anh Tuấn, Ngọc Tản, Bích Huyền, Mỹ Huyền, Minh Đức, Thanh Hải, Thu Hà, Minh Hòa, Kim Thanh, Kiều Thanh, Văn Toản, Trần Anh, Mai Liên, Anh Vũ, Xuân Tùng, Thanh Tú, Kỳ Anh, Mỹ Linh, Thu Hiền, Anh Phương, Trần Huấn...	'Muôn nẻo đường đời' theme song	Drama, Family, Romance	Ep 2 was moved to Wed + Sun time slot
22 Jul	Followed by the playback of Ước mơ của má (The Mother's Wish). The single-episode drama was first released on VTV1 channel in 1998.						
3 Aug	Followed by the playback of Lời hẹn ngày ra trận (The Promise Before the Battle). The single-episode drama was first released on VTV3 channel in 1998.						
10 Aug-5 Sep; Fri/Fri/Fri/Fri/Wed	Hồi sinh (Revival)	5	VTV Film Prod.	Bùi Huy Thuần (director); Nguyễn Quyến (writer); Hoàng Dũng, Minh Phương, Thu Hạnh, Trần Nhượng, Ngọc Thư, Vân Hát, Thu Huyền, Thế Hồng, Hồng Loan...	'Hồi sinh' theme song	Drama, Medical, Propaganda, Family	

=== Wednesday + Sunday night dramas ===
During the time from 25 Jul to the end of August, the Wednesday + Sunday night time slot turned into new time slot for Vietnamese dramas, along with Friday night.

These dramas air on every Wednesday and Sunday night from 21:00 to 22:00 on VTV1.

Broadcast	Title	Eps.	Prod.	Cast and crew	Theme song(s)	Genre	Notes
25 Jul	Người ở lại (The Staying One)	1				Drama	
1-19 Aug	Followed by the playback of Đất phương Nam (Song of the South), 11 episodes, 2 episodes per night except the final. The drama was produced and first released on HTV9 channel in 1997.						
22 Aug-3 Sep	Cửa ngõ (The Gateway)	5	VTV Center in HCMC & ĐNRTV	Trần Vịnh (director); Nguyễn Khắc Phục (writer); Tấn Hưng, Hoàng Hải, Phương Bằng, Trần Khiêm, Nguyệt Nhi, Lan Ngọc, Thích Huệ Tâm, Hữu Thành, Cẩm Linh, Sơn Quyên, Đình Thơ, Quang Mẫn, Thạch Kim Phượng, Ngọc Dũng, Thành Lũy, Công Hải, Tchernyshov Slava, Đông Nguyên, Minh Cường, Nguyễn Nam, Hải Bảo, Mai Hân, Kim Phượng, Thúy Lan, Võ Văn Thu, Thanh Minh, Lê Chữ, Phước Toàn, Duy Hòa, Nam Đông, Trần Ước, Minh Thế, Vũ Đình Tân, Văn Việt, Nguyễn Năng, Trần Minh Trí, Kim Thoa, Nguyễn Thị Huyền, Anh Thúy, Phan Bảo Khoa, Minh Ngọc, Quang Minh, Quang Tuấn, Nguyễn Long, Đỗ Quân...	Chiến tranh là gì? (What Is War?) by Mai Hoa Về một ngày mai (About a Future) by Việt Hoàn	Historical, War, Drama	Ep 5 was moved to Mon, 3 Sep. Originally 2 pts (10 eps) but only 5 eps was produced.

=== Monday night dramas ===
Starting from September, the VTV1 night time slots were re-arranged that only Monday night was for Vietnamese dramas while Tuesday to Thursday and Friday + Sunday night time slot (turned into Tuesday to Friday time slot and Sunday time slot since December) was for foreign dramas.

These dramas air on every Monday night from 21:00 to 22:00 on VTV1.

Broadcast	Title	Eps.	Prod.	Cast and crew	Theme song(s)	Genre	Notes
10 Sep	Followed by the playback of 2000 feature film Vào Nam ra Bắc (Down South Up North).						
24 Sep	Followed by the playback of 1999 feature film Dưới tán rừng lặng lẽ (Quiet in the Woods).						
1-29 Oct	Những người con đất cảng (Children of the Port Land)	5	VTV Film Prod.	Hoàng Tích Chỉ (writer); Thúy Hà, Nông Dũng Nam, Mỹ Linh, Thanh Hùng, Nông Phương, Bích Ngọc, Hồ Linh, Việt Chung ...	'Những người con đất cảng' theme song	Drama	Adapted from the novel of 'Khát vọng sông Đà'
5 Nov	Nắng chiều (Afternoon Sunshine)	1	VTV Film Prod.	Hoàng Trần Doãn (director); Bảo Châu (writer); Diễm Lộc, Thế Tục, Lê Mai, Dũng Nhi, Vi Cầm, Khánh Ly, Hải Anh, Bích Hằng, Đức Long, Thế Bình, Minh Hằng, Duy Thanh, Minh Phương, Danh Sơn, Thùy Dương, Vũ Huy, Mạnh Linh, Lê Ba, Kim Bình, Văn Hòa, Minh Chiến, Văn Hưu, Ngọc Luận ...	BOYS BE AMBITIOUS - instrumental only Composed by Tomoyuki Asakawa	Drama, Slice-of-Life, Family	Based on the short story of the same name by Nguyễn Khải.
12-19 Nov	Chúng tôi ngày ấy (Us That Day)	2	VTV Film Prod.	Tuệ Minh (director & writer); Lan Hương, An Chinh, Tuệ Minh, Mạnh Cường, Phú Kiên, Kim Quý, Hồng Chương, Văn Toản, Thanh Thủy, Kim Thoa, Thanh Toàn, Hữu Phương, Lê Thị Bá, Phương Thảo, Phương Linh, Bảo Anh, Hải Anh, Mai Hòa, Thanh Tùng, Thùy Dương, Thu Hương ...	Ước gì anh lấy được nàng (Wish I Could Marry You) by Tô Lịch & Bảo Lan	Drama, Rural, War, Romance	
3-10 Dec	Followed by the playback of Hoa trong bão (Flower in the Storm), 2 episodes. The drama was first released on VTV1 channel in 1995.						
17 Dec 2001- 28 Jan 2002	Ba lần và một lần (Thrice and Once)	10	VTV Center in HCMC	Trần Vịnh (director); Chu Lai (writer); Ngọc Thủy, Lê Khanh, Hà Xuyên, Trang Nhung, Vũ Linh, Mai Huỳnh, Ngọc Thảo, Tôn Thất Chương, Hồng Chương, Hồng Điệp, Bích Vân, Chí Hùng, Kim Dung, Khương Thịnh, Đức Mẫn, Chí Bảo, Hoàng Khiêm, Nguyễn Nam, Nguyễn Dạ Thảo, Bá Thi, Lan Ngọc, Ngọc Minh, Tấn Hưng, Ngọc Tuyết, Kim Dung, Kim Phượng, Trần Lượng, Mai Thành, Hữu Thành, Đông Nguyên, Bích Thủy...	Giữa chốn không em (In the Middle of a Place Without You) by Mỹ Tâm	Post-war, Drama, Crime	Based on the novel of the same name by Chu Lai. Ep 2-3-4 air on 19-20-21 Dec 2001 (Wed-Thu-Fri).

== VTV3 Cinema For Saturday Afternoon dramas ==
These dramas air in early Saturday afternoon on VTV3 with the duration approximately 70 minutes as a part of the program Cinema for Saturday afternoon (Vietnamese: Điện ảnh chiều thứ Bảy).

- Note: The time slot was delayed on 27 Jan due to the broadcast schedule for Tết programs.

Broadcast	Title	Eps.	Prod.	Cast and crew	Theme song(s)	Genre	Notes
20 Jan	Đổi chỗ (Switch)	1		Phạm Gia Phương (director & writer); Kim Hoàn (idea); Kim Hoàn, Huyền Trang, Trần Tiến, Tiến Quang...		Comedy, Marriage	Airs as a Tet drama
3-10 Feb	Tình rừng (Forest Love)	2		Nguyễn Hữu Luyện (director); Đoàn Hữu Nam (writer); Văn Trung, Hương Dịu, Như Trang, Đức Thuận, Mã A Lềnh, Lê Hồ Lan, Đoàn Hữu Nam, Thế Lai, Giàng A Quang, teachers and students of Lầu Thí Ngài school...	Nhịp khèn đi nương (Flute rhythm to the field) by Lương Kim Vĩnh	Drama, Ethnic	
17 Feb	Những người trẻ tuổi (The Ones in Youth)	1				Drama	
24 Feb	Nước mắt thơ ngây (Tears of Innocence)	1 (65′)	Giải Phóng Film	Xuân Cường (director); Hoàng Dũng, Triệu Vũ (writer); Thanh Thủy, Ngọc Trai, Kim Khánh, Hoàng Phúc, Vân Anh, Tuyết Thu, Thanh Thảo, Nguyệt Nhi, Thiên Lộc, Phi Vân, Đức Hiền, Vân Hà, Hoài Y, Minh Hiếu, Kim Hoàng, Mộng Thu...	Nước mắt thơ ngây (Tears of Innocence) by Bảo Phúc	Children, Drama, Family, Slice-of-Life	
3-10 Mar	Những kẻ giấu mặt (The Hidden Faces)	2	VFS	Nguyễn Thế Vĩnh (director); Nguyễn Xuân Hải (writer); Thế Bình, Xuân Tùng, Đức Quỳnh, Mỹ Anh, Viết Liên, Thái Ninh, Quốc Trịnh, Thành Tuấn, Đức Thịnh, Ngọc Căn, Minh Nguyệt, Mạnh Kiểm, Cao Nga, Thùy Dung, Tiến Quang, Mai Hoa, Mậu Hoa, Quỳnh Hoa, Hồng Điệp, Nguyễn Duyên, Xuân Hải, Danh Nhân, Trọng Hoàn, Nam Cường, Mỹ Hạnh, Thu Nga, Hành Lý, Thế Thông, Văn Hải, Duy Anh, Anh Tuấn, Lâm Ngọc, Hoàng Vĩ, Trần Phương...	Densetsu no Yuusha ～ Kokoro wa Hitotsu ～ by Rica Matsumoto, Sho Hayami	Drama, Crime	Based on a true crime case
17 Mar	Followed by the playback of Những người dớ dẩn (The Silly Ones) . The single-episode drama was first released also in Cinema For Saturday Afternoon in Oct 2000.						
24-31 Mar	Trái tim vuông (The Square Heart)	2 (80′)		Trần Vịnh (director); Nguyễn Mạnh Tuấn (writer); Mai Huỳnh, Nam Yên, Minh Thư, Đông Nguyên, Ánh Hoa, Mai Thành...	'Trái tim vuông' theme song by Măng Non choir	Drama, Political, Slice-of-Life	
7-14 Apr	Ngôi nhà trên cát (The House on the Sand)	2				Drama	
21 Apr	Ông nội... Ông nội (Grandpa... Grandpa)	1	VTV Film Prod.	Triệu Tuấn (director); Khuất Thị Vân Huyền (writer); Đặng Trần Quỳnh, Thế Tục, Hồng Chương, Quế Hằng, Huệ Đàn, Ngọc Hà, Quốc Khánh, Duy Khánh, Trung Cường, Hồng Hạnh, Vân Anh, Công Dũng...	'Ông nội ... Ông nội' theme song by Hương Mai	Children, Family, Drama	
28 Apr-5 May	Chuyện công ty Thu Vào (It Happened in Thu Vào Company)	2 (75′)	VFS	Lê Đức Tiến (director); Lưu Nghiệp Quỳnh (writer); Quế Hằng, Xuân Bắc, Thùy Dung, Xuân Tùng, Quang Thắng, Tuấn Minh, Hoàng Linh, Duy Hậu, Mai Hòa...		Comedy, Office	
12 May	Dịu dàng (Tenderness)	1				Drama	
19-26 May	Về nguồn (Back to the Root)	2		Nguyễn Hữu Luyện (director); Đỗ Thị Tắc (writer); Duy Thanh, Ngọc Thoa, Thùy Linh, Việt Thanh, Lương Huy, Vân Chung, Thúy Mùi, Minh Giám, Trà̂n Thị Nga, Xuân Chung, Thúy Nga, Hà Văn Mao, Lương Thị Pà̆ng, Lò Thu Vân...		Drama	
6-13 Jan; 2 Jun-18 Aug	Hoa cỏ may (Lovegrass): Pt. 1: Thời niên thiếu (The Childhood); Pt. 2: Những ngày bình yên (Peaceful Days)	14 (45′-60′); Pt. 1: 5e Pt. 2: 9e	Hodafilm	Lưu Trọng Ninh (director & writer); Quỳnh Anh/Vi Cầm, Ngọc Trung/Danh Sơn, Minh Đức/Hải Anh, Thương Hà/Khánh Ly, Trung Quân/Ngọc Quỳnh, Tuyết Mai/Hồ Ngọc Hà, Ngọc Tú/Quyết Thắng, Thùy Dương, Việt Thao, Hương Dung, Trần Nhượng, Tố Uyên, Anh Dũng, Mai Hòa, Xuân Thức, Minh Phương, Quốc Tuấn, Ngọc Trâm, Thái An, Bích Huyền/Ngọc Thủy, Mạnh Hùng, Công Dũng, Tuyết Trinh...	Hoa cỏ may (Lovegrass) by Hằng Nga	Romance, Drama, Youth	Delayed after first 2 eps due to broadcast schedule for Tet holiday. Its 3rd part was released by VFC in 2017, aired in VTV3's weeknight prime-time slot.
25 Aug	Hoa tỷ muội (Flower of Sisters)	1 (70′)		Xuân Sơn (director); Đào Thùy Trang (writer); Linh Huệ, Phú Thăng, Hồng Quang, Ngọc Vân, Hương Trang, Hoàng Dung, Quỳnh Trang, Tuyết Mai, Văn Toản, Bích Thoa, Ngọc Sơn, Bích Phương, Đào Hà, Hồng Nhật, Văn Thuận, Doãn Trịnh, Kim Dung...		Drama, Marriage, Family	
1-22 Sep	Sóng ngầm (Implicit Waves)	4 (75′)	Feature Film Studio I	Vũ Hồng Sơn, Nguyễn Hữu Trọng (directors); Nguyễn Thu Dung (writer); Mai Thu Huyền, Chí Công, Dũng Nhi, Quế Hằng, Công Dũng, Mai Lan, Bích Ngọc, Bích Thủy, Hữu Độ, Bình Trọng, Minh Hòa, Mạnh Thắng, Duy Thanh, Thế Lai, Minh Nghĩa, Mỹ Duyên, Thu Hà, Vi Ngọc Mai, Nam Cường, Thanh Lâm, Kim Xuyến, Khôi Nguyên, Cường Túc Túc...	Nếu phải xa nhau (If We Must Fall Apart) by Thương Huyền & Minh Quân	Romance, Drama, Family	
29 Sep	Quả muộn (It Fruits Late)	1		Xuân Sơn, Phạm Minh Quang (directors); Phạm Ngọc Tiến (writer); Hồng Chương, Tuấn Minh, Lan Minh, Trung Anh, Vân Anh, Thái An, Thu An, Xuân Tùng, Quang Hải, Quốc Khánh, Quang Phú, Nam Cường, Hoàng Thu, Minh Gái...		Family, Drama, Rural	Phạm Ngọc Tiến adapted his short story of the same name
6-13 Oct	Kỷ vật (Memorabilia)	2		Vũ Xuân Hưng (director & writer); Trịnh Bích Huyền, Lê Duy Linh, Đỗ Quang Trung, Nguyễn Đức Sơn, Nguyễn Bích Thủy, Nguyễn Mạc Ninh, Đoàn Thị Trưa, Nguyẽ̂n Chí Anh, Đặng Thị Tản, Huệ Đan, Thành An, Văn Toản, Đình Nhất, Nguyễn Thị Loan, Tuấn Anh, Bùi Sỹ Tự, Bình Nam, Việt Dũng, Kim Oanh, Nguyễn Thị Hòa, Nguyễn Thị Lực, Hữu Đại...	Heart to Heart (reprise); Composed by Yasunori Iwasaki Aratanaru Michi; Composed by Yasunori Iwasaki	Drama, Post-war, Children	
20 Oct	Chiến dịch ISO (The ISO Operation)	1		Khuất Quang Thụy (writer)		Comedy	
27 Oct-10 Nov	Anh Khóa (Brother Khóa)	3				Drama	
17 Nov	Nguyên tắc là nguyên tắc (Rules Are Rules)	1 (70′)		Duy Hậu, Quốc Tuấn, Phương Nhi, Lan Hương, Mai Hương, Hoàng Sơn...		Comedy	
24 Nov	Cái các của ông tổng giám đốc (The Card of the Director)	1		Đỗ Minh Tuấn, Hoàng Tấn Phát (directors); Đinh Tiệp (writer); Trịnh Mai, Hải Điệp, Hoàng Dũng, Văn Toản, Hoàng Thắng, Văn Khuê, Vũ Tăng, Minh Phương, Thanh Quý...		Comedy	
1 Dec	Tia nắng ấm (Warm Sunlight)	1				Drama	
8 Dec	Hai khoảng cuộc đời (Two Parts of the Life)	1		Phạm Đông, Trần Nhượng, Doãn Bằng (directors); Trần Hoàng Anh Phương, Nguyễn Quang Vinh (writers); Võ Hoài Nam, Tấn Đạt, Ngọc Bích, Kim Quí, Tuyết Mai, Trần Hạnh, Thu An, Thu Hương, Trang Ngân...		Drama	
15 Dec	Followed by the playback of Ti-vi về làng (TV to the Village). The single-episode drama was originally produced for Cinema For Saturday Afternoon but first released as a 2001 Tet drama.						
22 Dec	Con tôi đi lính (My Son Goes Soldiering)	1 (69′)		Phi Tiến Sơn (director); Lê An (writer); Tất Bình, Minh Châu, Nguyễn Khắc Hiếu, Kiều Vân, Hoàng Công, Mai Lan, Việt Dũng, Quốc Tuấn, Trần Hạnh, Lê Mai, Quốc Khôi...		Drama, Slice-of-Life	Adapted from Chu Lai's short story of same name
29 Dec	Thầy giáo dạy văn (The Literature Teacher)	1 (70′)		Nguyễn Hữu Luyện (director); Lê Hoài Nam (writers); Duy Thanh, Ngọc Quang, Thanh Hương, Thanh Thủy, Việt Thắng, Thanh Hiền, Thúy Hà, Thanh Tùng, Văn Anh, Thanh Tuấn, Ngọc Minh, Thu Thủy, Thanh Tùng, Tuấn Hải...		Slice-of-Life, Scholastic	

== VTV3 Sunday Literature & Art dramas ==
These dramas air in early Sunday afternoon on VTV3 as a part of the program Sunday Literature & Art (Vietnamese: Văn nghệ Chủ Nhật).

Broadcast	Title	Eps.	Prod.	Cast and crew	Theme song(s)	Genre	Notes
7 Jan	Chuyện nhà đại tá Trầm (Colonel Trầm Family Story)	1	VTV Film Prod.	Mạc Văn Chung (director); Thế Tục...		Drama, Family	
14-21 Jan	Hết sức bình tĩnh (You Need to Calm Down)	2 (70′)	VTV Film Prod.	Bùi Cường (director); Hồ Lê (writer); Tuấn Quang, Hoàng Thu Hường, Vũ Đình Thân, Phương Thanh, Mai Hòa, Huệ Đàn, Thanh Tú, Khánh Ly, Hoàng Yến, Công Dũng, Hương Thảo, Thu Hà, Bích Hạnh, Thiếu Ngân, Bảo Ninh, Ngọc Trâm, Giang Trang, Thi Chương, Mai Hương...	'Hết sức bình tĩnh' theme song Composed by Nguyễn Minh Hùng	Drama, Marriage	
28 Jan-4 Feb	Nơi tình yêu bắt đầu (Where the Love Begins)	2	VTV Film Prod.	Vũ Hồng Sơn (director); Nguyễn Toàn Thắng, Hồ Cúc Phương (writer); Công Dũng, Thanh Giang, Lê Quốc Thắng, Hữu Độ, Minh Hằng, Tuyết Mai, Tiến Mộc, Mỹ Linh, Mai Lan, Xuân Bắc, Hồng Quang...		Romance, Drama	
11 Feb	Không giống ai (Unlike Any Others)	1 (70′)	VTV Film Prod.	Nguyễn Hữu Phần (director); Nguyễn Hữu Trọng (writer); Chí Nghĩa, Thùy Dung, Thành An, Ngọc Thoa, Ngọc Hà, Bá Anh, Thúy Hiền, Cường Việt, Phạm Bằng, Nam Cường, Hồng Hạnh, Huyền Trang, Hương Thảo, Mỹ Duyên, Mậu Hòa, Thu Hương, Thế Hồng, Đình Thắng, Vũ Huy, Văn Đức, Huỳnh Đệ, Hồng Vân...		Comedy, Slice-of-Life	
18 Feb	Bóng dáng người cha (Silhouette of a Father)	1 (75′)	VTV Film Prod.	Nguyễn Anh Tuấn (director & writer); Trần Hạnh, Mỹ Duyên, Việt Thắng, Bích Thủy, Tú Anh, Bá Cường, Thùy Dương, Anh Dũng, Hoàng Nam, Việt Hà, ...		Family, Drama	Based on Bá Dũng's short story 'Đêm dài'
25 Feb	Dư âm hạnh phúc (Repercussion of Happiness)	1 (65′)	VTV Film Prod.	Nguyễn Danh Dũng (director); Phan Khởi Nhật (writer); Vĩnh Xương, Vũ Mai Huê, Thu Hường, Công Lý, Hoàng Duy, Tú Long, Tuấn Minh, Thanh Quý, Đặng Tiệp, Minh Khang, Tuyết Mai, Kim Xuân, Văn Tuấn, Hồ Liên...		Drama, Romance	
4 Mar	Nhịp sống (The Beat of Life)	1 (70′)	VTV Film Prod.	Hữu Mười (director); Nguyễn Trân (writer); Lê Tuấn, Thúy Hà, Công Lý, Thu Hường, Tuấn Quang, Phạm Hồng Minh, Mai Hương, Khánh Ly, Nam Cường, Hữu Phương, Mạnh Tuấn, Duy Lương, Mai Nhung, Văn Đồng...		Drama, Business, Slice-of-Life	
11 Mar-3 Jun	Mùa lá rụng (Fall Foliage Season)	13 (75′)	VTV Film Prod.	Trần Quốc Trọng (writer); Đặng Minh Châu (writer); Dũng Nhi, Thanh Quý, Chu Văn Thức, Bạch Diện, Tuấn Kiên, Thanh Lan, Đỗ Kỷ, Thái An, Ngân Hà, Diệu Thuần, Đức Trung, Trọng Nghĩa, Khôi Nguyên, Nam Cường, Diễm Lộc, Bích Liên, Ngọc Liên, Mỹ Huyền, Mạnh Tuấn, Thúy Ngần, Công Dung, Trà Mi, Mỹ Duyên, Ngọc Dung, Hồng Hà, Văn Chung, Mai Ngọc Căn, Trần Tiệp, Văn Chinh, Nguyễn Thị Tĩnh, Quốc Hùng, Văn Quỳnh, Vân Anh, Văn Tiến, Văn Thức, An Chinh, Trần Nhượng, Quỳnh Hoa, Minh Hiếu, Trần Quốc Trọng, Thu Thủy, Văn Bảy, Hoàng Sơn, Đức Thảo, Trọng Phúc, Thu Hương, Đàm Phô, Đức Thu, Trọng Khôi, Phương Khanh, Phát Triệu...	Mùa lá rụng (Fall Foliage Season) by Mai Hoa	Family, Drama	Based on Ma Văn Kháng's novels 'Mùa lá rụng trong vườn' & 'Đám cưới không giấy giá thú'
10 Jun	Chuyện cuộc đời (A Story of Life)	1 (65′)	VTV Film Prod.	Vũ Trường Khoa (director); Hoàng Ngọc Sơn, Nguyễn Xuân Thành (writer); Vân Anh, Hồng Giang, Huyền Thanh, Hoàng Sơn, Thành Tuấn, Lê Hiếu, Lê Minh, Văn Phúc, Hồng Gấm, Việt Anh, Nam Cường, Văn Hải...		Drama	
17 Jun	Những mảnh đời nhỏ bé (Little Lives)	1	VTV Film Prod.			Drama, Slice-of-Life	Adapted from short story of the same name by Huệ Minh
24 Jun-22 Jul	Con nhện xanh (The Green Spider)	5	VTV Film Prod.	Đỗ Đức Thành, Mai Hồng Phong (directors); Lê Phương, Trịnh Thanh Nhã (writers); Trọng Khôi, Tiến Đạt, Minh Châu, Mạnh Cường, Khánh Huyền, Chiều Xuân, An Chinh, Đức Sơn, Nguyễn Hải, Tạ Minh Thảo, Thu Nga, Tuyết Mai, Quốc Tuấn, Nguyễn Tuấn, Văn Thuận, Mai Ngọc Căn, Tuấn Phong, Thu Hương, Mậu Hòa, Nam Cường, Trần Toàn, Trọng Hải, Cát Trần Tùng...		Drama, Political	
29 Jul	Chàng Trần Cung đi cấp cứu (Trần Cung in the Emergency)	1 (75′)	VTV Film Prod.	Mạc Văn Chung (director & writer); Quốc Khánh, Tùng Dương, Hương Thảo, Quế Hằng, Kim Xuyến, Hạnh Đạt, Tuyết Liên, Hoàng Yến, Thúy Phương, Phạm Hòa, Văn Toàn, Thế Bình, Phương Tâm, Thanh Gấm, Thành Trung...		Drama, Marriage	A part of Trần Cung the series
5 Aug	Hương cam (The Scent of Orange)	1	VTV Film Prod.	Phạm Dũng (writer); Trần Nhượng, Huệ Đàn, Lương Nga, Đắc Hoàng, Lan Minh, Mai Hoa, Trần Dũng, Hoàng Bút, Vân Anh, Hoàng Phương, Trần Trọng, Thu Thủy, Minh Đức, Quốc Thắng, Trần Quỳnh...		Drama	
12 Aug	Thầy và bạn (Teachers and Friends)	1	VTV Film Prod.	Giang Minh (director); Đoàn Phương Nhung (writer); Trọng Trinh, Thanh Duyên, Thế Bình, Quốc Toàn, Ngọc Tản, Hoàng Tùng, Hải Anh, Ngọc Thu, Quốc Trung, Trần Thạch, Chu Nhiên, Hạnh Ly...		Drama, Slice-of-Life	Based on the short story Cô giáo Truân by Lê Ngọc Minh
19-26 Aug	Đất cằn (Barren Land)	2	VTV Film Prod.			Drama	
2-9 Sep	Thời gian còn lại (The Remaining Time)	2	VTV Film Prod.	Vũ Trường Khoa (director); Khánh Vi (writer); Thành Tuấn, Trần Hạnh, Hoàng Dũng, Thanh Huyền, Vũ Hạnh, Lệ Mỹ, Thanh Hương, Hoàng Sơn, Văn Hải, Tạ Thu, Mai Lan, Khôi Nguyên, Lê Hải...		Drama	Based on the short story "Phút cám dỗ cuối cùng" by Trần Chinh Vũ
16 Sep-7 Oct	Một người chiếu bóng (A Screening Man)	4	VTV Film Prod.	Đỗ Chí Hướng (director); Phạm Minh Châu (writer); Hồng Giang, Linh Huệ, Hồ Lan, Văn Hiệp, Vũ Tăng, Mạnh Tuấn, Anh Quân, Thành Chung, Đức Hải, Lan Minh, Văn Hồng, Lê Hiếu, Ngọc Thúy, Lê Minh, Mai Hòa, Khôi Nguyên, Thu An, Đức Long, Văn Phương, Đức Thắng, Văn Hòa, Văn Kiên, Văn Toàn, Thanh Toàn, Mai Ngọc Căn, Thanh Đô...	Một đời người một rừng cây (A Life A Forest) by Quang Huy	Drama, Slice-of-Life	Adapted from the novel of 'Bốn chín chưa qua' by Trần Chiến
14 Oct-18 Nov	Kẻ không cầu may (The One Won't Care For Luck)	6 (70′)	VTV Film Prod.	Bạch Diệp (director); Đỗ Trí Hùng (writer); Phạm Hồng Minh, Vũ Mai Huê, Anh Quân, Ngọc Thủy, Phạm Bằng, Lan Anh, Phú Đôn, Mạnh Dũng, Lê Mai, Trần Hạnh, Văn Toản, Quang Huy, Đức Toàn, Danh Sơn, Mạnh Kiểm, Kim Bình, Bích Vân, Lan Minh, Hoàng Anh, Sĩ Kỳ, Kim Thoa, Ngọc Thoa, Xuân Bắc, Trần Khải, Trung Kiên, Ngọc Hà, Hồng Quân, Ngọc Quỳnh, Ngọc Khôi...	Tôi vẫn hát (I'm Still Singing) by Thu Phương	Drama, Business, Political, Romance	
25 Nov-2 Dec	Tiếng gọi nơi xa thẳm (The Call From Far Away)	2	VTV Film Prod.	Mạc Văn Chung (director); Đỗ Trí Hùng (writer); Trọng Trinh, Quế Hằng, Lê Tuấn, Tùng Dương, Thu Nga, Hoàng Yến, Văn Toản, Tuấn Minh, Phương Lâm, Giang Châu, Khánh Tùng, Quang Thịnh, Lan Minh, Massey Parr, Quang Thắng, Ngọc Quyền, Vương Huỳnh, Trần Kiểm, Khắc Y, Thế Bình, Văn Thuận, Minh Thu, Hoàng Vân, Giang Tùng, Thấm Nhuần, Tất Thanh, Tuyết Nhung,...		Drama	
9 Dec 2001- 3 Feb 2002	Phía trước là bầu trời (Ahead Is The Sky)	9 (75′)	VTV Film Prod.	Đỗ Thanh Hải (director); Đặng Diệu Hương, Nguyễn Kim Thoa, Trần Thanh Linh (writers); Thu Nga, Hà Hương, Kiều Anh, Nguyễn Thành Vinh, Kiều Thanh, Hoàng Tuấn, Diệu Thảo, Trang Nhung, Nguyễn Hoàng, Văn Anh, Mỹ Linh, Việt Linh, Danh Sơn, Hán Văn Tình, Hoàng Dũng, Trí Đức, Đức Thuận, Diệp Bích, Lim Yong Hoon, Xuân Thức, Thu Hương, Lan Minh, Thành An, Trí Chung, Minh Đức, Kim Anh, Park Ji Hoon, Vân Anh, Huyền Thanh, Hà Quân, Hoàng Mai, Khôi Nguyên, Thế Bình, Thu Hương, Hồng Hân, Ngọc Vân, Minh Hòa...	Lời chưa nói (Unspoken Words) by Trần Thu Hà	Romance, Youth, Drama	Follow its fame was raised back in 2018, VFC produced a short extra story which combined Phía trước là bầu trời, Người phán xử & Cả một đời ân oán

== For The First Time On VTV3 Screen dramas ==
Starting from January 2001, the time slot was moved from Tuesday night to Sunday night.

These dramas air in every Sunday night after the 19:00 News Report (aired later or delayed in occasions of special events) under the name of the program For The First Time On VTV3 Screen (Vietnamese: Lần đầu tiên trên màn ảnh VTV3).

- Note: Unlisted airtime periods were spent for special events.

Broadcast	Title	Eps.	Prod.	Cast and crew	Theme song(s)	Genre	Notes
4 Mar-1 Apr	Vết trượt (Sliding Smear)	5 (50′)	VTV Film Prod.	Vũ Minh Trí (director); Lương Xuân Thủy (writer); Mai Châu, Hoàng Hải, Quách Thu Phương, Diễm Loan, Quốc Khánh, Hoàng Vi, Linh Huệ, Vũ Mai Huê, Phạm Cường, Huyền Thanh, Kim Oanh, Phú Thăng, Lan Minh, Ngân Hoa, Hồng Tuấn, Minh Nguyệt, Thanh Huyền, Thu Thủy, Minh Châu, Thu Hương, Trần Anh...		Drama, Family, Marriage, Business	
8 Apr-13 May	Followed by the playback of Người từ cung trăng (You From the Moon), 3 episodes. The drama was produced and first released on HTV9 channel in 1997. *Note: Episode 3 was delayed 3 weeks (on 22 & 29 Apr, 6 May).						
27 May-24 Jun	Followed by the playback of Con nhà nghèo (Children of the Poor), 5 episodes. The drama was produced and first released on HTV9 channel in 1999.						
1-8 Jul	Followed by the playback of Cõi tình (Love Realm), 2 episodes. The drama was produced and first released on HTV9 channel in 1998.						
15 Jul	Followed by the playback of Bao giờ thuyền lại sang sông (When Will the Boat Cross the River Again). The single-episode drama was produced and first released on VTV1 channel in 1997.						
22 Jul-5 Aug	Followed by the playback of Bến nước... Đời người (The Wharf, the Human Life), 3 episodes. The drama was produced and first released one month ago on VTV1 channel.						
12 Aug	Followed by the playback of 1996 feature film Ai xuôi vạn lý (The Long Journey).						
19 Aug	Followed by the playback of 2001 feature film Chiếc chìa khóa vàng (The Golden Key).						
26 Aug	Followed by the playback of 1995 feature film Trận đấu cuối cùng (The Last Fight).						
9-16 Sep	Followed by the playback of 1995 feature film Lưỡi dao (Blade), divided into 2 episodes.						
23 Sep-7 Oct	Followed by the playback of Tiếng xưa (The Old Sound), 2 episodes. The drama was produced and first released on VTV3 channel in 1999.. *Note: Delayed 1 weeks (on 30 Sep).						
14-28 Oct	Followed by the playback of Tình bạn (Friendship), 3 episodes. The drama was released beforehand.						
11-18 Nov	Followed by the playback of Bằng lăng tím (Purple Lagerstroemia), 2 episodes. The drama was first released earlier in 2001 on BPTV.						
25 Nov 2001- 6 Jan 2002	Ngày hè sôi động (Exciting Summer Days)	6 (70′)	VTV Film Prod.	Trọng Trinh (director); Lê Phương, Trịnh Thanh Nhã, Hoàng Nhung (writers); Lưu Hà, Viết Liên, Quế Hằng, Lê Quốc Thắng, Hương Thảo, Thúy Hằng, Ngô Hồng Thái, Quang Hưng, Tuấn Hùng, Sơn Tùng, Thúy Ngân, Hà Duy, Hải Anh, Chí Công, Mỹ Hằng, Giang Minh, Phạm Bằng, Tuấn Minh, Khánh Ly, Quốc Quân, Tuấn Bình, Hồng Hạnh, Minh Hằng, Bá Cường, Lệ Ngọc, Văn Hải, Đức Long, Lan Minh, Trần Nhượng, Mai Ngọc Căn, Hồng Điệp, Minh Sự...	Đêm hè (Summer Night) by Phạm Tuấn Hùng	Coming-of-Age, Drama, Sport, Romance	Delayed 1 ep on 9 Dec 2001

== See also ==
- List of dramas broadcast by Vietnam Television (VTV)
- List of dramas broadcast by Hanoi Radio Television (HanoiTV)
- List of dramas broadcast by Vietnam Digital Television (VTC)
