= Collection (Arvingarna album) =

Compilation album by Arvingarna
- Released: 28 October 2002
- Recorded: 1991–2002
- Genre: Dansband music

Arvingarna chronology
Diamanter (2001)	Collection (2002)	Samlade hits (2003)

Collection is a 2002 compilation album from Swedish "dansband" Arvingarna.

== Track listing ==
1. Eloise
2. Jeannie (Jeannie's Coming Back)
3. I gult och blått (No hay nada màs)
4. Angelina
5. Räck mig din hand
6. Coola killar
7. En 68:a cabriolet
8. Sången till Jennifer
9. Magdalena
10. Ock hon sa
11. Rakt in i hjärtat
12. Tjejer
13. Granna Anna
14. De ensammas promenad
15. Natt efter natt
16. Än finns det kärlek
17. Ring om du vill någonting
18. Du och jag
19. Om dessa väggar kunde tala
20. Pamela
