= Det svär jag på =

Single by Arvingarna

from the album Lime
- Released: 1999
- Genre: dansband pop
- Label: Musikverkstan
- Songwriters: Lena Philipsson, Torgny Söderberg

"Det svär jag på" is a song written by Lena Philipsson and Torgny Söderberg, and performed by Arvingarna at Melodifestivalen 1999, where it ended up third. It was also released as a single. The song was originally thought to have been performed by Lena Philipsson herself.

At the Swedish singles chart it peaked at number 39. The song also charted at Svensktoppen for four weeks between 10 April-15 May 1999, peaking at fourth position before getting knocked out of chart.

== Charts ==
Chart (1999)	Peak position
Sweden (Sverigetopplistan)	39
