= Björnzone =

Swedish parody boy band

- Origin: Sweden
- Genres: Pop
- Years active: 2024–present
- Label: Sony Music
- Members: Björn Gustafsson; Adam Lundgren; Boris René; Casper Janebrink; Eric Saade; Filip Berg; Loa Falkman; Måns Zelmerlöw; Ulrik Munther; Victor Leksell
- Website: bjornzoneofficial.com

Björnzone are a fictional Swedish parody boy band supergroup created in 2024 by comedian Björn Gustafsson. They first appeared as an interval act for Melodifestivalen 2024, where they performed "Still the One", jokingly entering as a 13th entry for the competition's final in March. With Gustafsson as lead singer, Björnzone consists of ten members; the other nine are Adam Lundgren, Boris René, Casper Janebrink, Eric Saade, Filip Berg, Loa Falkman, Måns Zelmerlöw, Ulrik Munther and Victor Leksell. All are established singers, with the exception of actors Lundgren and Berg.

"Still the One" was written by Johan Carlsson, Rami Yacoub and Charlie Puth. In an interview with Aftonbladet, Gustafsson said that he first reached out to Carlsson with the idea, who then got in touch with frequent collaborator Puth. Following the Melodifestivalen final, the song was released onto digital music platforms as a solo recording as Gustafsson felt it was too complicated to deal with all the members' various record label agreements. "Still the One" became one of the most-streamed songs on Spotify in Sweden, and peaked at number 15 on the Sverigetopplistan singles chart. The performance of "Still the One" ended up as the most-watched YouTube video of 2024 in Sweden.

On 29 November 2024, the group released "A Christmas Song", written by Johan Carlsson and Andreas Carlsson, through Sony Music, with proceeds going to Radiohjälpen. Recording and filming was done in Los Angeles, United States, in September 2024, as a secret project with Sveriges Television (SVT). The Christmas song was recorded at Henson Studios, the same studio where "We Are the World" was recorded. "A Christmas Song" became the first Christmas song to debut atop the Svensktoppen chart and has peaked at number six on the Sverigetopplistan chart. The song was the most-streamed 2024 Christmas song in Sweden, according to Spotify. Björnzone 2.0, a documentary following the band as they record "A Christmas Song", was released by SVT on 25 December 2024.

In June 2026, the group released their third single, "All of My Heart". Written by Johan Carlsson, Mark Owen, Mozella and Gustafsson, it was described as the unofficial song of the Swedish national team for the 2026 FIFA World Cup. Zelmerlöw was absent from both the music video and promotional images.

== Discography ==
=== Singles ===
List of singles, with year released and chart positions
Single	Year	Peak positions
Single	Year	SWE
"Still the One"	2024	15
"A Christmas Song"	2024	6
"All of My Heart"	2026	28
