= Marie Bergman =

Swedish singer

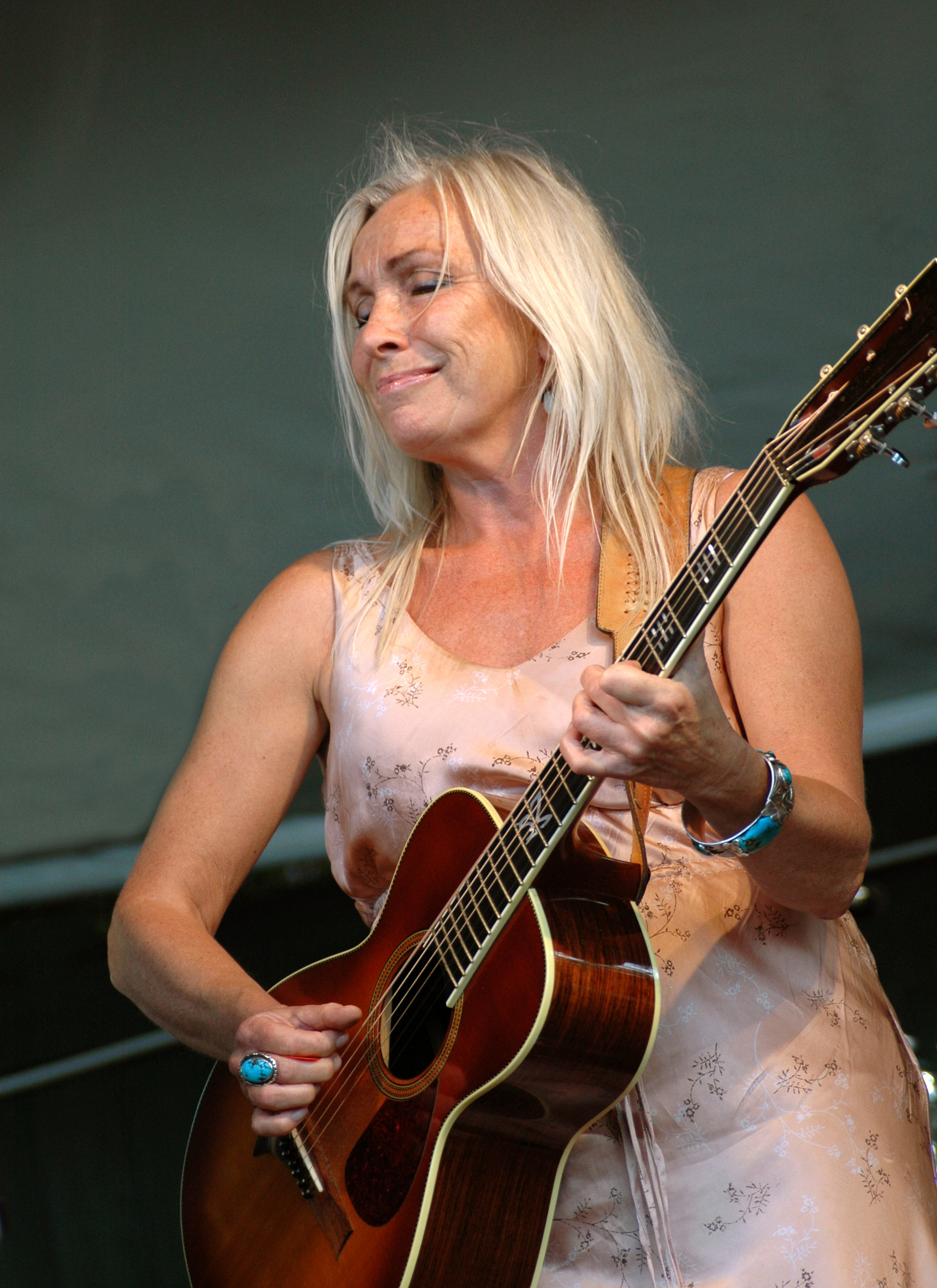
- Bergman in 2009

Background information
- Born: 21 November 1950 (age 74); Stockholm, Sweden
- Genres: Pop, Schlager, folk music, jazz
- Occupation: Singer
- Years active: 1968–

Marie Bergman (born 21 November 1950) is a Swedish singer. Between 1969 and 1972, she was a member in the pop group Family Four, which represented Sweden at the Eurovision Song Contest in 1971 and 1972. She started her solo career in 1974. She has during the years released 13 own-written records and 2 jazz albums and has received numerous awards. In 1994, she again represented Sweden at the Eurovision, this time with Roger Pontare, setting a record as the singer who has represented Sweden at the ESC the most times. This was equalled by Carola Häggkvist in 2006. Marie has performed at the Roskilde Festival four times.

Awards and achievements
Preceded by Arvingarna with "Eloise"	Sweden in the Eurovision Song Contest (with Roger Pontare); 1994	Succeeded by Jan Johansen with "Se på mej"
