= Coola killar (album) =

Coola Killar

Studio album by Arvingarna
- Released: June 1992
- Genre: Dansband music

Arvingarna chronology
Coola Killar (1992)	Eloise (1993)

Coola killar ("Cool Guys") is the debut studio album by Swedish dansband Arvingarna, released in 1992.

== Track listing ==
1. "Sången till Jennifer" (Gert Lengstrand)
2. "Have You Ever Seen the Rain" (John Fogerty)
3. "Jeannie" ("Jeannie's Coming Back") (Norell Oson Bard K. Almgren)
4. "Ögon blå" (J.-E. Karlzon, K. Larsson)
5. "Put Your Head on My Shoulder" (Paul Anka)
6. "Akta dej" (Å. Hallgren)
7. "Sloop John B" (trad., B. Wilson)
8. "Coola killar" (T. Gunnarsson, E. Lord)
9. "Hur kan jag nånsin glömma dig" (J.-E. Karlzon)
10. "Looky Looky" (Giorgio Moroder)
11. "Sound of Silence" (Paul Simon)
12. "Kung i stan" ("The Wanderer") (E. Maresca, Gert Lengstrand)
13. "Elenore" (M. Volman, H. Kaylan, J. Pons, J. Barbata, A. Nichol, Gert Lengstrand)
14. "The End of the World" (S. Dee, A. Kent)

== Charts ==
Chart (1992–1993)	Peak position
Sweden (Sverigetopplistan)	49
