= 8 (Arvingarna album) =

#8

Studio album by Arvingarna
- Released: 15 June 2005
- Genre: Dansband
- Label: Mariann Grammofon

Arvingarna chronology
Samlade hits (2003)	#8 (2005)	All Included (2007)

#8 was released in 2005 and is the tenth studio album by Swedish dansband Arvingarna. The album peaked at number 23 on the Swedish Albums Chart.

== Track listing ==
1. "Superstar"
2. "Hon kommer med sommaren"
3. "Hela vägen hem"
4. "Söndag 06:55"
5. "Till en öde ö"
6. "I hennes ögon"
7. "Varje gång vi tänker på varann"
8. "Då kanske drömmen slår"
9. "Hela världen till dej"
10. "Tid att leva"
11. "Flickan ovanpå"
12. "Som i en dröm"
13. "Har du ångrat dej"
14. "Ensamma stunder"

== Charts ==
Chart (2005)	Peak position
Swedish Albums (Sverigetopplistan)	23
