= Lime (album) =

Studio album by Arvingarna
- Released: June 1999
- Genre: Dansband music

Arvingarna chronology
| Airplane (1998) | Lime (1999) | Diamanter (2001) |

Lime is a 1999 album by Swedish dansband Arvingarna. It was released during the year of the band's 10th anniversary.

== Track listing ==
1. Du vet var jag finns - 4:16
2. Är du lycklig nu - 3.45
3. Det svär jag på - 3:33
4. Sommar och solvarma dar - 3:16
5. När jag flyger - 4:03
6. Jag vill ge natten till dig - 4:12
7. Magdalena - 3:02
8. Halvvägs hem till dig - 3:38
9. En ledig sommardag - 2:56
10. Bye Bye So Long - 3.00
11. Programmerad kärlek - 3.40
12. Jag vet vad kärlek är - 3:35
13. Låt oss bara vara vänner - 3:24
14. Att va´ kär - 2:50
15. Jag och min gitarr - 3:48
16. Det svär jag på - remix - 2:48

== Charts ==
| Chart (1999) | Peak position |
|---|---|
| Sweden (Sverigetopplistan) | 13 |
