= Nya spår =

Studio album by Arvingarna
- Released: November 1997

Arvingarna chronology
| Då & nu (1996) | Nya spår (1997) | Airplane (1998) |

Nya spår is the fifth studio album by Swedish dansband Arvingarna, released in November 1997. The album peaked at number 41 on the Swedish Albums Chart.

== Track listing ==
1. Pamela
2. Låt oss tala känslor
3. Jag drar iväg
4. Det kan ingen ändra på
5. Blå är min himmel
6. Sommarliv
7. Drömmen om en frihet
8. En dag i taget
9. Små paket
10. De ensammas promenad
11. Gud, vad hon är läcker
12. Om dessa väggar kunde tala
13. Stan é för stor för oss två
14. Vilken härlig dag
15. Månen är kvar
16. Go go Jenny

== Charts ==
| Chart (1997) | Peak position |
|---|---|
| Sweden (Sverigetopplistan) | 41 |
