= Underbart =

Studio album by Arvingarna
- Released: 25 November 2009
- Genre: modern dansband music
- Length: 41:14
- Label: Dansbandsbolaget
- Producer: Gert Lengstrand, Mats Persson

Arvingarna chronology
Upp till dans (2009)	Underbart (2009)	Änglar och en massa kärlek (2013)

Underbart is the twelfth studio album by Arvingarna, released on 25 November 2009.

== Track listing ==
#	Title	Writer	Vocals	Length
1.	"Livet är underbart"	Lasse Larsson, Kim Carlsson, Tommy Carlsson	Casper	2.57
2.	"Kärlek överallt"	Erlandsson, Andreasson, Ingela "Pling" Forsman	Lasseman	3.05
3.	"Alice i ett underland"	Erlandsson, Andreasson, Wassenius	Kim	3.07
4.	"Hemma hos mig igen" ("Talk Back Trembling Lips")	J Laudermilk, H. Carlsson	Tommy	3.00
5.	"Bara 15 år"	Lasse Larsson, Kim Carlsson, Tommy Carlsson	Lasseman	3.20
6.	"California Dreamin'"	John Philipps, Michelle Phillips	Casper	3.12
7.	"Hon är oslagbar"	J. Lengstrand, Pilebo, Gert Lengstrand	Casper	3.06
8.	"Lever en dröm"	Erlandsson, Andreasson	Kim	3.06
9.	"Hela världen är du och jag"	Erlandsson, Andreasson, Wassenius, Arvingarna	Casper	2.58
10.	"Amelie"	Lasse Larsson, Gert Lengstrand	Tommy	3.05
11.	"När vinden har vänt"	S. Ericsson, Ulf Georgsson	Lasseman	3.36
12.	"I Wanna Hold You"	Tom Fletcher, Danny Jones, Dougie Poynter	Casper	2.47
13.	"Förlorad i dig"	J. Lengstrand, Gert Lengstrand	Lasseman	3.27

== Contributors ==
- strings: Mattias Bylund
- violin: Mattias Johansson
- Viola: Irene Bylund
- Cello: David Bukovinszky

== Charts ==
Chart (2009)	Peak position
Sweden (Sverigetopplistan)	35
