= Diamanter =

Studio album by Arvingarna
- Released: 20 August 2001
- Genre: Dansband music

Arvingarna chronology
Lime (1999)	Diamanter (2001)	Collection (2002)

Diamanter is a 2001 album by Swedish dansband Arvingarna.

== Track listing ==
1. Intro - 0:53
2. Om du vill ha mig - 3:32
3. Ta mig till det blå - 4.28
4. Diamanter - 3:38
5. Madelene - 3:37
6. En man för dig - 3:18
7. Tro mig - 3.31
8. Sjunde himlen - 3:03
9. There's som Many Things - 2.53
10. Rakt in i hjärtat - 3:07
11. Jag skall ta med dig till havet - 3.29
12. Marie - 3:23
13. Du fick mig att öppna mina ögon - 3:09
14. Det finns ingen mening - 3:32
15. Twilight - 3.18
16. Sommarhimmel - 3.31

== Charts ==
Chart (2001)	Peak position
Sweden (Sverigetopplistan)	17
