= List of VTV dramas broadcast in 2000 =

This is a list of VTV dramas released in 2000.

←1999 - 2000 - 2001→

== VTV New Year dramas ==
This film airs from 07:25 a.m to 08:45 a.m on VTV1 to celebrate new year and new decade. Followed by the special program Happy New Year 2000.

Broadcast	Title	Eps.	Prod.	Cast and crew	Theme song(s)	Genre	Notes
1 Jan	Công dân vàng (Golden Citizen)	1	Feature Film Studio I	Đặng Tất Bình (director); Thiên Phúc (writer); Hữu Mười, Hoa Thúy, Hoàng Thắng, Minh Hòa, Duy Hậu, Phương Thanh...		Comedy, Marriage	

== VTV Tet dramas ==
These films were released on VTV channels during Tet holiday.

Broadcast	Title	Eps.	Prod.	Cast and crew	Theme song(s)	Genre	Notes
3 Feb	Những tháng năm yêu dấu (The Dearest Time)	1	VTV Center in Mekong Delta	Châu Huế (director); Nguyễn Khắc Phục (writer)		Drama	Airs 20:15, 28th Tet holiday on VTV3
4 Feb	Nơi cơn lũ đi qua (Where the Flood Crossed)	1 (75′)	VTV Film Prod.	Nguyễn Khải Hưng (director); Nguyễn Thị Thu Huệ (writer); Minh Châu, Trọng Trinh, Ngọc Huyền, Sơn Tùng, Thủy Kiên, Phi Yến, Quý Phi, Đào Châu, Thành Vinh, Thanh Nga, Giang Minh, Việt Đức, Mai Phương, Danh Nhân, Mạnh Toàn, Đức Mẫn, Ngọc Tiến...		Drama, Romance	Airs 17:15, 29th Tet holiday on VTV1
5 Feb	Xuân Cồ: Nhà bình luận thể thao (Xuân Cồ the Sports Commentator)	1	VTV Film Prod.	Trần Quốc Trọng (director); Khuất Quang Thụy (writer); Phú Đôn, Hồng Trang, Hồng Ngân, Duy Hiển, Quang Tùng, Xuân Thọ, Ánh Ngọc, Quang Đốt, Thế Hành, Hồng Sếnh, Nguyễn Rặt, Hồng Hải, Tuấn Anh,...		Comedy, Sport, Rural	Airs 19:45, 1st Tet holiday on VTV3
6 Feb	Đám cưới làng (Rustic Wedding)	1	VTV Film Prod.	Đặng Tất Bình (director); Đỗ Trí Hùng (writer); Công Lý...		Comedy, Family, Rural, Drama	Airs 21:30, 2nd Tet holiday on VTV1
7 Feb	Quên (Oblivious)	1	VTV Film Prod.	Nguyễn Khải Hưng (director)		Comedy	Airs 3rd Tet holiday

== VTV1 Friday night dramas ==
These dramas air on every Friday night around 21:00 on VTV1.

Note:
- Several dramas can be added more days in week due to a certain intention from VTV.
- The list includes some Vietnamese dramas air on VTV1 in the time slot that originally for foreign dramas due to special occasions.

Broadcast	Title	Eps.	Prod.	Cast and crew	Theme song(s)	Genre	Notes
3-7 Jan; Mon-Wed-Thu-Fri	Làng Thanh mở phố (Thanh Village Opens a Street)	4	VTV Film Prod.	Vũ Hồng Sơn (director); Nguyễn Thu Dung (writer); Duy Thanh, Thu Huyền, Thanh Chi, Kim Thoa, Nông Thu Trang, Huy Công, Viết Liên, Thu Hằng, Hoàng Tuấn...		Rural, Drama	Adapted from Huy Cờ's novel 'Phố làng'.
9-14 Jan; Sun/Fri	Khung trời yên tĩnh (Quiet Airspace)	3	VTV Film Prod.	Trần Vịnh (director); Văn Lê (writer); Tuyết Nương, Lê Bảo Trung, Như Thảo, Tấn Hoàng, Hoàng Yến, Quang Chương, Bích Ngọc, Robert Tomb, Chấn Hưng, Minh Chiến, Hùng Nam...		Drama, Romance, War	Ep 1-2 air back-to-back on Sun, 9 Jan
21 Jan-3 Mar	Làm mẹ (Mothered)	6 (80′)	VTV Film Prod.	Trần Quốc Trọng (director); Bùi Đôn Minh (writer); Linh Huệ, Hữu Đại, Phát Triệu, Anh Tuấn, Thương Huyền, Hà Duy, Phương Loan, Diệu Ánh, Thái Duy, Thái Sơn, Mai Anh, Mỹ Linh, Ngọc Huệ, Phú Thăng, Thành An, Bích Thủy, Ngọc Thoa, Phương Nhi, Vân Anh, Phú Đôn, Xuân Chung, Vũ Tăng, Trọng Tuân, Văn Tuấn, Văn Hân, Công Lý...		Children, Drama	Adapted from story of 'SOS' by Nguyễn Hương. Delay 1 ep on 4 Feb due to Tet holiday.
3 Feb; Thu	Những ngày cuối cùng trong xà lim án chém (Last Days in the Guillotine Cell)	1 (99′)	VTV Film Prod.	Bạch Diệp (director); Bạch Diệp, Ngọc Thụ, Nghiêm Đa Văn (writers); Lê Hồng Quang, Thu Hiền, Ngọc Thủy, Minh Châu, Hoàng Dũng, Danh Thái, Nguyễn Quỳnh, Hoàng Sơn...		Biography, Drama, Historical, War	Based on Nguyễn Đức Cảnh's life. Celebrating 70 Years of Vietnam Communist Party.
10-24 Mar	Cánh cửa cuộc đời (The Door of Life)	3	Tây Đô Film Prod.	Phạm Thùy Nhân (writer); Ngọc Thúy...		Drama	
31 Mar-14 Apr	Lúa và đất (Rice and Soil)	3	VTV Film Prod.	Nguyễn Thế Vĩnh (director); Võ Xuân Hà (writer); Diệu Thuần, Hữu Độ, Minh Nguyệt, Đăng Khoa, Hồng Quang, Lan Anh, Thành An, Thu Hà, Anh Quân, Quang Trung, Trung Hiếu, Thanh Thủy, Hồng Gấm, Vi Phong, Tuyết Liên, Bá Cường, Quang Trung, Cao Minh, Thúy Bắc, Xuân Nông, Mạnh Sinh, Kế Đoàn, Trần Tâm, Hạnh Kiểm, Thanh Lương, Trí Thành, Khắc Trịnh, Hoàng Nam, Anh Đức, Bác Văn...		Rural, Drama, Political	
21-30 Apr	Followed by the playback of Ván bài lật ngửa (Cards on the Table), 8-parts feature film franchise, to celebrate the Reunification Day (30 Apr). *Note: The franchise was aired almost every day of the week except the Saturdays.						
5 May	Followed by the playback of Như một huyền thoại (Like a Legend). The single-episode drama was first released on HTV7 in 1995.						
12-26 May	Chuyện xưa (Old Story)	2	VTV Film Prod.	Vũ Minh Trí (director); Đặng Trần Hiếu (writer); Mai Ngọc Căn, Hoàng Thu Hường, Kim Thoa, Bá Cường, Thành An, Hồng Quang, Tuyết Liên, Sĩ Tiến, Vân Anh, Hoàng Kiên, Phương Nga, Phú Thăng, Huyền Thanh...	Kanashimi wo Fukitobase; Composed by Toshiyuki Watanabe	Drama, Family	Delayed a week (on 19 May)
18 May; Thu	Followed by the playback of Huyền thoại vườn vải (Legend of Lychee Garden) to celebrate Leader Hồ Chí Minh's Birthday. The single-episode drama was first released on VTV1 in 1995.						
2 Jun	Ngọn đèn trước gió (The Light Against the Wind)	1 (80′)	VTV Film Prod.	Bùi Cường (director); Huy Bảo (writer); Ngọc Thoa, Thanh Quý, Phương Thanh, Điệp Vân, Vũ Đình Thân, Đức Thuận, Anh Tuấn, Kim Ngân, Đức Anh, Lan Anh, Minh Đức, Quốc Thắng, Đình Lương, Quang Hưng, Như Lai, Nông Dũng Nam, Hùng Cường, Đăng Hòa...	Bồng bồng con nín con ơi (Crying Baby Coaxing Lullaby)	Family, Drama	
9-23 Jun	Động Cát Đỏ (Red Sand Cave)	3	VTV Film Prod. & BTV	Trần Vịnh (director); Nguyễn Ngữ, Trần Vịnh (writers); Thu Hà, Phương Bằng, Chấn Hưng, Nguyễn Đình Thơ, Minh Đăng, Thu Vân, Thiên Kiều, Tuyết Nương, Tam Anh, Anh Tuấn, Ngọc Đặng, Nhị Hà, Ngọc Ánh, Văn Quảng, Nguyễn Tịnh, Quý Hà, Phan Tư, Duy Tuấn, Ngọc Hân, Lê Thị Hoa, Thanh Tuyền, Ngọc Thương, Phương Trang...	'Động cát đỏ' theme song by VOV orchestra and choir	Historical, War, Drama	
30 Jun-7 Jul	Bức đại tự (The Big Calligraphy Frieze)	2 (80′)	VTV Film Prod.	Mạc Văn Chung (director); Lê Công Hội, Mạc Văn Chung (writers); Vĩnh Xương, Thúy Hà, Hồng Quang, Lâm Tùng, Quốc Khánh, Hồng Chương, Phương Thanh, Hạnh Đạt, Hồ Liên, Thanh Tùng, Ngọc Chung, Phương Lâm...		Rural, Family, Drama	
14 Jul	Việc làng thời nay (Modern Era Village Job)	1				Rural, Drama	
21 Jul	Followed by the playback of Bản giao hưởng đêm mưa (Symphony of the Rainy Night). The single-episode drama was first released on VTV1 in 1994.						
27 Jul	Followed by the playback of Trăng muộn (Late Moon) to celebrate the War Invalids and Martyrs Day. The single-episode drama was first released on VTV1 in 1992.						
28 Jul	Followed by the playback of U Thỏn (Mother Thỏn). The single-episode drama was first released on VTV1 in 1998.						
4-25 Aug	Chuyện đã qua... (A Past Story)	4 (75′)	VTV Film Prod.	Trần Phương (director); Hoàng Thùy Nguyên (writer); Quốc Trị, Trần Hạnh, Ngọc Dung, Ngọc Thư, Thanh Tâm, Mai Hương, Lương Hữu Đại, Trần Hùng, Đức Long, Kim Quý, Hạnh Đạt, Nam Cường, Tuấn Dương, Minh Tuấn, Hồng Chương, Hạc Đính, Huệ Hát, Hồ Trung, Đức Mẫn, Hạnh Ly, Hồng Điệp, Cao Nga, Hồng Vân, Trọng Hoàn, Mạnh Kiểm, Giang Minh...	'Chuyện đã qua' theme song by Nông Xuân Ái & Minh Huệ	Rural, Political, Drama, Period	Adapted from Hoàng Minh Tường's 1997 award-winning novel 'Thủy hỏa đạo tặc'
30 Aug; Wed	Bức ảnh trong lòng đất (The Photo From the Ground)	1 (72′)	VTV Film Prod.	Nguyễn Hữu Phần (director); Phạm Ngọc Linh (writer); Hoàng Yến, Duy Thanh, Tuấn Quang, Mỹ Linh, Hương Thảo, Quốc Thắng, Kim Oanh, Mạnh Sinh, Mai Ngọc Căn, Tuyết Liên, Hữu Độ, Ngọc Tản, Hoàng Kiên, Thu Hương, Minh Đức, Chu Hùng, Bá Duy, Đức Thịnh, Khánh Duy, Minh Tiến, Ngọc Điệp, Tiến Minh, Mạnh Cường, Tuấn Thịnh, Thúy Nga, Thu Trang, Trần Hoàng, Văn Đức, Hoàng Nam, Lê Tuấn...		Post-war, Drama	Celebrating the National Day
1-10 Sep; Fri-Sun/Wed-Sun	Chị Sáu Kiên Giang (Miss Sáu Kiên Giang)	4 (75′)	VTV Center in HCMC	Trần Vịnh (director); Nguyễn Mạnh Tuấn (writer); Mạnh Dung, Ánh Hoa, Lệ Hằng, Như Thảo, Hoàng Thơ, Nam Yên, Quốc Tống, Quang Mẫn, Đặng Tuấn, Thoại Ngọc, Mai Khi, Đông Nguyên, Quang Đạt, Hồng Anh, Gia Huy, Thúy Hoa, Mộng Kiều, Ngọc Dũng, Huỳnh Anh, Ngọc Loan, Minh Vinh, Nguyễn Nam, Nguyễn Thanh, Minh Hiển, Hữu Thành, Hoài Minh, Lương Đức Hùng, Thanh Phong...	'Chị Sáu Kiên Giang' theme song by Ngọc Trang	Biography, Historical, Drama, War	Celebrating the National Day.
8-29 Sep	Khát chữ (Thirst for Words)	4		Đào Quang Thép (writer); Trần Nhượng...		Rural, Drama, Period	Based on novel of same name by Đào Quang Thép
6-13 Oct	Chuyện làng Đông (Story of Đông Village)	2 (70′)	VTV Film Prod.	Nguyễn Thế Hồng (director); Nguyễn Thị Thu (writer); Hồng Điệp, Bá Cường, Tiến Quang, Ngọc Thư, Anh Quân, Ngọc Vân, Đình Thắng, Minh Hằng, Tuấn Anh, Mai Hương, Ngọc Tản, Đức Mẫn, Cao Nga, Minh Tuấn, Chí Công, Thiếu Ngân, Mai Linh, Linh Chi...		Rural, Drama	
9-11 Oct; Mon-Tue-Wed	Followed by the playback of Sông Hồng reo (Red River Rising), 3 episodes, to celebrate the Capital Liberation Day. The drama was first released on H channel in 1995.						
20 Oct	Duyên thầm (Silently Graceful)	1	VTV Film Prod.	Bùi Trường Khoa (director); Đỗ Duy Thi (writer); Kim Thoa, Thanh Huyền, Trần Hạnh, Hương Dung, Ngọc Khôi, Xuân Thủy, Đan Kha, Trần Anh, Đức Hải, Bảo Hoa, Thúy Hường, Xuân Thanh, Đức Chính, soldiers of Lạng Sơn Border Guard, Tân Thanh Border Gate workers and the unloading team of the Đồng Đăng station...	Mitsumete Itai by Yukiyo Satou	Drama, Romance, Ethnic	Originally intended as a Tet drama.
27 Oct	Followed by the playback of 1990 feature film Vị đắng tình yêu (The Bitterness of Love).						
3 Nov	Followed by the playback of Dòng sông thao thức (Restness River). The single-episode drama was first released on VTV3 in 1998.						
10-12 Nov; Fri-Sun	Hương bánh khảo (The Flavour of Sha Gao)	4 (45′)	VTV Film Prod. & Zhujiang Film Prod.	Lê Cường Việt, Ho Gin Lit (directors); Trần Thùy Linh, Hoàng Nhuận Cầm, Phạm Ngọc Tiến, Lỗ Văn Hạo, Hà Kiện Liệt (writers); Shum Haau Jung, Mạnh Cường, Ng Jyun Piu, Tuấn Quang...	'Hương bánh khảo' theme song	Romance, Drama, Slice-of-Life	Airs 2 eps per night
17 Nov-8 Dec	Followed by the playback of Xóm bờ sông (Riverside Hamlet), 4 episodes. The drama was first released three months ago in Sunday Literature & Art on VTV3.						
19-20 Nov; Sun/Mon	Followed by the playback of Thầy và trò (A Teacher and His Students), 2 episodes, to celebrate the Teachers' Day. The drama was first released on VTV1 in 1998.						
15-22 Dec	Người làng Cát (People of Sand Village)	3	VTV Film Prod.	Trần Vịnh (director); Mai Anh, Trần Vịnh (writers); Thu Hà, Hoàng Thơ, Chấn Hưng, Phương Bằng, Minh Đáng, Đông Nguyên, Thu Vân, Bích Ngọc, Sơn Quyên, Hoàng Khiêm...	'Người làng cát' theme song	Historical, War, Drama	Following up Động Cát Đỏ
29 Dec	Followed by the playback of Giai điệu mùa thu (Autumn Melody). The single-episode drama was first released on VTV3 in 1999.						

== For The First Time On VTV3 Screen dramas ==
These dramas were aired under the name of the program For The First Time On VTV3 Screen (Vietnamese: Lần đầu tiên trên màn ảnh VTV3).

Until the end of April, the program followed the schedule since late 1999 which it airs on every Saturday afternoon.

Since May, the program was moved to every Tuesday night time slot after the 19:00 News Report (aired later or delayed in occasions of special events).

- Note: The airtime with an asterisk (*) at the end indicates that the broadcast order is undefined

Broadcast	Title	Eps.	Prod.	Cast and crew	Theme song(s)	Genre	Notes
8 Jan-25 Mar	Đường đua vô tận (The Endless Race)	9	TĐN	Lê Ngọc Linh (director); Thùy Duyên (writer); Nhật Thương, Ngọc Cư, Thành Được, Hùng Khánh, Phương Thảo, Đình Khanh, Chu Thanh Hà, Nhất Quang, Trâm Anh, Thanh Hà, Hiền Lương, Quyết Chiến, Duy Xết, Thu Thảo, Lê Thành, Lê Nga, Thu Hoài, Thành Phát, Duy Vinh, Minh Hiệp, Bích Quyên, Xuân Ánh, Thanh Phong, Quang Thái, Anh Nghĩa, Xuân Phú, Bích Trâm...	Những đường đua mới (The New Races) by Ánh Tuyết	Drama, Sport	Delayed 3 weeks (on 22 & 28 Jan, 5 Feb) due to special events
1 Apr	Chú dế nhỏ tội nghiệp (Poor Little Cricket)	1 (76′)	VTV Film Prod.	Hoàng Trần Doãn (director); Đỗ Trí Hùng (writer); Hoàng Duy, An Nguyên, Thu An, Phú Thăng, Thu Hà, Minh Khánh, Minh Tuấn, Thu Hương, Hồng Kỳ, Đức Sơn, Ánh Tuyết...		Children, Drama, Scholastic	Based on the short story "Cu Long" by Hoàng Thủy Bảo Châu.
8-22 Apr	Công ty "co dãn mênh mông" ("Immense Elasticity" Company)	3 (70′)	VTV Film Prod.	Đỗ Minh Tuấn (director & writer); Trịnh Mai, Phạm Bằng, Tiến Đạt, Chí Trung, Nguyễn Ánh, Đỗ Vân, Vũ Tăng, Thu Hà, Trần Tiệp, Duy Hậu, Vân Anh, Hồng Chương, Thanh Tú, Cường Túc, Văn Toản, Mạnh Sinh, Thành Tuấn, Văn Hùng, Quỳnh Hoa, Hồng Thúy, Hương Nga, Trung Anh, Văn Thịnh, Kim Đức, Trần Đức, Đỗ Hoàng Nam...		Comedy	Each eps have its own name: Khai trương (To Open), Bươn chải (To Strive), Giải thể (To Dissolve)
29 Apr	Hát mãi khúc quân hành (Endless Marching Songs)	1 (75′)	VTV Film Prod.	Đặng Tất Bình, Phi Tiến Sơn (directors & writers); Đức Trung, Diệu Thuần, Hữu Độ, Dũng Nhi, Thành An, Thanh Hiền, Đình Chiến, Phú Đôn, Minh Gái, Minh Nguyệt, Tuấn Anh, Duy Thanh, Anh Tuấn, Bích Vi, Trung Hiếu...	Hát mãi khúc quân hành (Endless Marching Songs) by the choir	Post-war, Drama	Produced to celebrate the Reunification Day
3-9 May	Followed by the playback of Ngày mai (Tomorrow), 2 episodes. The drama was first released also in For The First Time on VTV3 Screen in 1999.						
16 May*	Nụ cười người khác (Other One's Smile)	1	VTV Film Prod.	Phạm Thanh Phong (director and writer); Tiến Đạt, Quốc Khánh, Chí Trung, Thùy Hương, Hải Yến, Linh Nga, Trọng Khôi, Thu Hiền, Thu Hương, Bích Liên, Thu Thủy, Ngọc Thái, Thúy Vân...	Taruruuto's Theme; Composed by Seiji Yokoyama	Comedy	Based on Trần Văn Tuấn's short story
23 - 30 May*		2				Drama	
6 Jun-8 Aug	Cảnh sát hình sự (Criminal Police): File 6: Bí mật hồ Hang Rắn (The Secret at Snake Cave Lake); File 7: Hãy về với em (Darling! Come Back!)	10; F6: 6e F7: 4e	VTV Film Prod.	Nguyễn Khải Hưng (executive director); Nguyễn Quang Thiều, Nguyễn Thành Phong, Trung Trung Đỉnh, Phạm Ngọc Tiến, Nguyễn Quang Lập (writers); Văn Báu, Hoàng Hải, Võ Hoài Nam, Hoa Thúy (main cast); Trần Hạnh, Duy Hậu, Tạ Minh Thảo, Quang Thiện, Ngọc Dung, Tùng Dương, Thanh Tùng, Thế Hồng, Đàm Quang, Trịnh Mai Nguyên, Đức Thuận, Nguyễn Ánh, Đức Ninh, Tuấn Minh, Vũ Tăng, Ngọc Tản, Sơn Đông, Anh Tuấn... (File 6 cast); Thanh Bình, Thanh Tùng, Hương Thảo, Thu Hương, Thu Vân, Meri, Nguyệt Hằng, Xuân Tùng, Văn Tuyến, Hoài Phương, Cao Thắng, Nguyễn Tùng, Quốc Long, Ngọc Quỳnh, Hồng Giang, Hồng Gấm, Bích Hạnh, Bích Loan, Xuân Tiên, Khôi Nguyên, Nam Cường... (File 7 cast)	Những bàn chân lặng lẽ (Quiet Steps) by Thùy Dung	Crime, Drama	Following up Cảnh sát hình sự (1999)
15 Aug-9 Sep	Followed by the playback of Những đứa con thành phố (Children of the city) to celebrate August Revolution and the National Day. The drama was first released on HTV7 in 1998. *Note: The time slot was extended only for this drama: Ep 2-3 (back-to-back), 6 & 10 aired on Saturday nights (19 Aug, 26 Aug, 9 Sep); Ep 4 & 8 air on Sunday nights (20 Aug & 3 Sep) along with the rest of episodes (1, 5, 7 & 9) airs in the original time slot on Tuesday night.						
12-19 Sep	Followed by the playback of Đất làng (Village Land), 2 episodes. The drama was first released on TRT channel earlier in the same year.						
26 Sep	Followed by the playback of 1994 feature film Khách ở quê ra (The Guest from Countryside).						
3-10 Oct	Followed by the playback of two-part film franchise Người đi tìm dĩ vãng (The Bygone Seeker). The films were released in 1994.						
17 Oct	Followed by the playback of Giã từ cát bụi (Farewell to the Dust). The single-episode drama was first released on HTV9 in 1999.						
24-31 Oct	Followed by the playback of Dòng suối không cầu (The Spring Without Bridges), 2 episodes. The drama was first released on HTV7 in 1998.						
7-21 Nov	Mía đắng (Bitter Cane)	6	TĐN	Lê Ngọc Linh (writer)		Drama	Airs 2 eps back-to-back per night
28 Nov-12 Dec	Chuyện học đường (School Story)	5 (50′)	VTV Film Prod.	Nguyễn Anh Tuấn (director & writer); Chí Công, Thùy Dương, Minh Phương, Phú Thăng, Trung Anh, Hữu Độ, Danh Nhân, Thu Hiền, Thanh Chi, Lê Tuấn, Dân Đức, Tuấn Minh, Thu Hương, Trọng Tuấn, Hoàng Nam, Công Dũng, Văn Đáng, Hùng Thái, Lan Anh, Trọng Cường, Kiều Thu, Đức Thịnh, Minh Đức, Hoàng Anh, Thanh Trà, Duy Anh, Xuân Khiêm, Tuệ Trinh, Tú Mai...	Mùa thi năm ấy (That Exam Season) by Sao Mai Quartet: Lan Hương, Hương Ly, Phương Hiền, Kiều Vân	Scholastic, Drama, Family	Airs 2 eps per night except ep 1
19 Dec 2000- 25 Feb 2001	Cảnh sát hình sự (Criminal Police): File 8: Từ đen đến trắng (From the Black to the White)	10	VTV Film Prod.	Nguyễn Khải Hưng (executive director); Nguyễn Quang Thiều, Nguyễn Thành Phong, Trung Trung Đỉnh, Phạm Ngọc Tiến, Nguyễn Quang Lập (writers); Văn Báu, Hoàng Hải, Võ Hoài Nam, Hoa Thúy (main cast); Trần Dũng, Việt Thắng, Thái Kha, Lan Hương 'Bông', Diễm Lộc, Hoàng Thái, Danh Nhân, Trần Mai, Đức Thịnh, Thanh Tú, Vũ Huy, Tuấn Anh, Bích Vân, Kim Thanh, Thu Hương, Me Ghi, Vân Dung, Quốc Tuấn, Thanh Hà, Trần Vinh, Xuân Thu, Xuân Vũ, Mạnh Hùng... (File 8 cast)	Những bàn chân lặng lẽ (Quiet Steps) by Thùy Dung	Crime, Drama	The time slot was moved to Sunday night since Episode 3. The final part of the original Cảnh sát hình sự series (1999-2001).

== VTV3 Cinema For Saturday Afternoon dramas ==
New time slot was established this year as a collaboration of VTV and Vietnam Cinema Department, with the aim of creating a playground for feature filmmakers. It aired each two weeks during August and September (as a demo) and weekly since October.

These films air in Saturday afternoon on VTV3 with the duration approximately 70 minutes as a part of the program Cinema for Saturday afternoon (Vietnamese: Điện ảnh chiều thứ Bảy). They were produced by filmmakers in Cinema For Saturday Afternoon Club and several partner film studios.

Broadcast	Title	Eps.	Prod.	Cast and crew	Theme song(s)	Genre	Notes
5 Aug	Đức tin (Faith)	1		Bùi Thạc Chuyên (director)		Drama, Post-war	
19 Aug	Ước muốn cao sang (Lofty Desire)	1		Lê Đức Tiến (director); Đoàn Trúc Quỳnh (Writer)		Comedy, Sport	
2 Sep	Hoàng hôn xanh (Blue Sunset)	1		Nguyễn Hữu Luyện (director); Lương Đình Dũng (writer); Phạm Bằng, Văn Hiệp, Khôi Nguyên, Thế Tục...		Drama	
16 Sep	Dạy chồng (Teaching My Husband)	1		Đỗ Minh Tuấn (director); Nguyễn Thiên Phúc, Đỗ Minh Tuấn (writers); Trần Tiến, Mạnh Tuấn, Đức Chính, Thanh Huyền, Cường Túc Túc, Mai Phương, Minh Tâm, Toàn Thổ...		Comedy, Marriage	
30 Sep	Lựa chọn (The Choice)	1		Trần Phương (director); Nông Thu Trang...		Drama	
7 Oct	Anh ấy làm ở xưởng phim (He's Working in Film Studio)	1				Drama	
14 Oct	Những người "dớ dẩn" (The Silly Ones)	1	Feature Film Studio I	Nguyễn Thế Vĩnh (director); Phạm Ngọc Tiến (writer); Viết Liên, Vân Anh, Phạm Cường, Duy Thanh, Xuân Bắc, Vương Hà, Thành An, Văn Toàn, Trần Kiểm, Bích Ngọc, Nguyễn Đô, Văn Kiệm...		Drama	Based on the short story Ngày mai by Nam Ninh
21 Oct	Đèn cù (Spinning Lanturn)	1				Drama	
28 Oct	Triệu phú làng Kình (Kình Village's Millionaire)	1		Nguyễn Khắc Lợi (director); Phạm Ngọc Tiến (writer)		Rural, Drama, Comedy	Phạm Ngọc Tiến adapted his short story of the same name
4 Nov & 2 Dec	Hương bạc hà (The Flavour of Mint)	2		Lê Hoài Nam (writer)		Drama	Ep 2 airs after Ep 1 one month
11 Nov	Bên ấy quê cha (There! Father's Home)	1				Drama, Rural	
18-25 Nov	Sứ giả làng (Emissary of the Village)	2		Đỗ Minh Tuấn (director); Lê Ngọc Minh (writer); Trần Hạnh, Chí Nghĩa, Mai Lan, Hương Dịu, Mai Châu, Văn Hiệp, Hoàng Yến, Tiến Mộc, Đào Thị Loan, Thanh Hưng, Thanh Nhàn, Vũ Toàn, Đăng Khoa, Đoàn Long...		Rural, Drama, Slice-of-Life	
9 Dec	Vết sẹo (The Scar)	1 (68′)		Thương Tín (director); Đoàn Trúc Quỳnh (writer); Hoàng Thu Hường, Lê Tuấn, Ngọc Hà, Thùy Dung, Duy Hậu, Minh Nguyệt, Mẫn Thu, Văn Phúc, Thu Vân, Tiến Quang...		Romance, Drama	
16 Dec	Ánh sáng trắng (White Light)	1 (71′)		Phạm Gia Phương (director); Phạm Gia Thanh (writer); Hồng Chương, Ngọc Lan, Lê Tuấn Phong, Thanh Tú, Thu Huyền, Hạnh Ngân, Trần Tiệp...		Drama, Family	
23 Dec	Núi tương tư (Lovesick Mountain)	1		Tự Huy (director & writer); Lê Thu Hà, Phạm Hồng Minh, Vũ Thiếu Ngân, Vũ Hương Cốm, Hữu Độ, Văn Hiệp, Hoàng Thắng, Khắc Uẩn...	'Núi tương tư' theme song by Văn Vĩ	Romance, Drama, Period	Based on Tản Đà's poem 'Thề non nước'
30 Dec	Followed by the playback of Đức tin (Faith). The film kicked off the program Cinema For Saturday Afternoon in 5 Aug.						

== VTV3 Sunday Literature & Art dramas ==
These dramas air in early Sunday afternoon on VTV3 as a part of the program Sunday Literature & Art (Vietnamese: Văn nghệ Chủ Nhật).

- Note: The time slot was delayed on 6 Feb due to the broadcast schedule for Tết programs.

Broadcast	Title	Eps.	Prod.	Cast and crew	Theme song(s)	Genre	Notes
2 Jan	Đồng hành (Companion)	1	VTV Film Prod.	Hồ Văn Trọng, Thu Hương,...	See You Again by Kazue Ikura	Drama	
9 Jan	Giếng làng (Village Wells)	1	VTV Film Prod.	Mạc Văn Chung (director); Mai Đức (writer); Ngọc Dung, Trịnh Thịnh, Tuấn Quang, Thành An, Quốc Khánh, Diễm Lộc, Đức Dũng, Hạnh Đạt, Ngọc Tản, Hồng Chương...	'Giếng làng' theme song Composed by Vũ Thảo	Drama, Rural	
16 Jan	Nước mắt đàn ông (Man's Tears)	1	VTV Film Prod.	Đỗ Thanh Hải (director); Nguyễn Thị Thu Huệ (writer); Lâm Tùng, Thanh Hằng, Thanh Hiền, Thúy Phương, Trọng Trinh, Hồng Tuấn, Việt Quân, Hoài Thu, Hồng Minh, Thu Thơm, Ngọc Xuân...		Drama	
23 Jan	Nhật ký Y Von (Yvonne's Diary)	1 (70′)	VTV Film Prod.	Bùi Tiến Quý (writer); Eléna, Hữu Độ, Minh Nguyệt, Phú Thăng, Hồ Lan, Ngọc Trân, Minh Giám, Bích Nguyệt, Vi Xuyên, Bình Trọng, Mai Ba, Chiến Thắng, Robert...		Drama	
30 Jan	Quà năm mới (New Year Gift)	1 (65′)	VTV Film Prod.	Nguyễn Danh Dũng (director); Nguyễn Quyến (writer); Hoàng Duy, Phạm Đỗ Nguyên, Lý Bá Vũ, Hoàng Dũng, Lan Hương 'Bông', Hoàng Yến, Đức Sơn, Việt Thắng, Thùy Hương, Trần Đức, Mạnh Duy, Thu Huyền, Việt Sơn, Minh Phương, Thúy Phương...		Children, Family, Drama	Airs as a Tet drama. Adapted from Nguyễn Khoa Đăng's short story 'Đi Tết thầy'.
13-27 Feb	Qua những đêm lạnh giá (Through the Cold Nights)	3 (70′)	VTV Film Prod.	Bùi Cường (director); Nguyễn Anh Dũng (writer); Chiều Xuân, Anh Tuấn, Xuân Trường, Minh Tâm, Phát Triệu, Tuyết Liên, Phan Ngọc Lan, Mai Hòa, Bích Thủy, Kim Bình, Hữu Phương, Nguyễn Chung, Thanh Nhàn, Hữu Chung, Tiến Khải, Mỹ Bình...	Tiếng buồn (Sound of Sadness) by Trọng Thủy	Post-war, Drama, Rural, Romance	
5 Mar	Chỗ của mỗi người (Place of Each One)	1	VTV Film Prod.			Drama, Children, Scholastic	
12 Mar	Chuyện thầy tôi (Story of My Teacher)	1	VTV Film Prod.	Đỗ Chí Hướng (director); Đỗ Hồng Ngọc (writer); Trần Lực, Bích Huyền, Thu Hòa, Hương Dung, Phú Đôn, Phạm Bằng, Văn Hiệp, Thu An, Duy Hậu, Hữu Thắng, Thanh Bảo...		Drama, Slice-of-Life, Post-war	Adapted from short story 'Hương đồng' by Đỗ Bảo Châu
19 Mar-2 Apr	Dây neo hạnh phúc (Happiness Holding Cord)	3	VTV Film Prod.	Triệu Tuấn (director); Đặng Minh Châu (writer); Hà Văn Trọng, Mạnh Cường, Khánh Huyền, Hồ Liên, Linh Nga, Bạch Diện, Huệ Đan, Thu Hương, Văn Đoàn, Anh Túc, Hữu Lương, Quốc Hùng, Đức Mẫn, Hồng Thuận, Thanh Vân, Thu Hà, Hồng Đức, Trần Dũng, Mỹ Bình, Thanh Hương, Thanh Tùng, Như Lai...	'Dây neo hạnh phúc' theme song by Thu Hồng	Family, Drama, Marriage	
9-16 Apr	Trước thềm thế kỷ (Before the Turn of the Century)	2	VTV Film Prod.	Trọng Trinh (director); Dương Tuấn Dũng (writer); Bá Anh, Hồng Quang, Công Dũng, Ngọc Hà, Nguyễn Bích Ngọc, Quang Trung, Hồng Minh, Phát Triệu, Văn Hiệp, Bá Cường, Mạnh Sinh...	'Trước thềm thế kỷ' theme song	Drama, Coming-of-Age, Youth	
23 Apr	Thám tử gặp may (Lucky Sleuth)	1 (77′)	VTV Film Prod.	Trần Quốc Trọng (director); Trần Kỳ Trung (writer); Phạm Hồng Minh, Hồng Hoa, Sông Hương, Văn Bộ, Công Lý, Hải Điệp, Ngọc Thoa, Hoàng Lâm, Trần Tiệp, Công Nguyên, Quý Đông, Bá Hoài, Bích Thủy, Kim Phượng, Thanh Thế, Phương Loan, Trọng Tuân...		Comedy, Romance	
30 Apr	Ngàn năm mây trắng (Thousand Years in the Clouds)	1 (60′)	VTV Film Prod.	Nguyễn Khải Hưng (director); Bảo Ninh (writer); Tạ Thị Loan, Hà Văn Trọng, Hart Max, Minh Châu, Kim Hoàn, Trần Đức, Bá Cường, Quang Thiện, Phương Nhi, Nguyệt Hằng, Tuấn Kịch, Thảo Vân, Hùng Bống...	Arashi no Hero - Instrumental only Composed by Takashi Kudo	Drama, Post-war, Slice-of-Life	Produced in the occasion of Reunification Day
7 May	Giả sơn (Fake Paint)	1	VTV Film Prod.	Vũ Hồng Sơn (director); Khuất Quang Thụy (writer); Xuân Trường, Văn Thành, Minh Phong, Phú Đôn, Thu Hằng, Hạnh Đạt, Công Lý, Bá Hoài, Văn Hiệp, Hà Duy, An Nguyên, Hải Anh, Quang Huy, Thu Huyền, Thanh Vân, Bích Phượng, Bích Thủy, Hoàng Chung, Vĩnh Thắng, Đức Hoàn, Lê Liên, Xuân Cường...	Ore Taruruuto by TARAKO Kimi to Sekai Seifuku!? by Midori Akiyama	Comedy	
14-28 May	Những người con hiếu thảo (The Fillial Offsprings)	3	VTV Film Prod.	Trần Phương (director); Mai Thế Song (writer); Trung Hiếu, Quách Thu Phương, Trần Tiến, Kim Hoàn, Minh Phương, Chu Xuân Hoan, Thanh Tú...		Family, Drama	
4 Jun	Tiếng chuông đồng (Sound of the Copper Bell)	1	VTV Film Prod.	Nguyễn Anh Tuấn (director); Linh Nga, Phương Loan, Quang Sơn, Văn Hẻo, Xuân Giang, Xuân Du, Văn Điền.....		Drama	
11 Jun	Thiên đường của ông nội (Grandpa's Paradise)	1 (70′)	VTV Film Prod.	Nguyễn Hữu Luyện (director & writer); Trịnh Thịnh, Quỳnh Châu, Hồng Chương, Phạm Minh Nguyệt, Lê Tuấn, Thanh Thủy, Tuyết Liên, Thu Hiền, Thanh Năng...		Family, Drama, Rural, Slice-of-Life	Adapted from short story of the same name by Nguyễn Thị Tuyết
18 Jun	Câu chuyện tác thành (Matchmaking Story)	1	VTV Film Prod.	Phú Đôn...		Comedy, Romance	Adapted from Lê Minh Khuê's short story of the same name.
25 Jun	Hai đầu xa thẳm (Far Far Away From The Other Side)	1	VTV Film Prod.	Đỗ Chí Hướng (director); Đỗ Hồng Ngọc (writer); Văn Hiệp, Xuân Trường, Hương Dung, Hồng Giang, Tiến Mạnh, Hoàng Thùy Linh, Thanh Tùng, Duy Lương, Nguyệt Hằng, Văn Thành, Xuân Khải...	Bài ca Trường Sơn (Song About Trường Sơn) by Trung Kiên; Trường Sơn Đông, Trường Sơn Tây (East Trường Sơn, West Trường Sơn) by Thu Hiền & Trung Đức	Post-war, Drama, Family	Adapted from short story of 'Hết chiến tranh rồi' by Văn Linh
2-23 Jul	Đồng quê xào xạc (Rustling Rural Homeland)	4 (75′)	VTV Film Prod.	Đặng Tất Bình, Phi Tiến Sơn (directors); Quỳnh Lâm, Đặng Tất Bình (writers); Trung Hiếu, Trang Nhung, Quốc Tuấn, Công Lý, Thu Hạnh, Phú Đôn, Duy Hậu, Tuyết Liên, Quang Thiện, Nguyễn Ánh, Hồng Điệp, Đình Chiến, Xuân Bắc, Văn Toản, Thanh Chi, Thanh Dương, Xuân Thức, Vũ Tăng...	Người ơi hãy về (Come Home, My Love) by Hồng Hạnh	Rural, Post-war, Drama, Romance	Adapted from Tạ Bảo's short story of the same name
30 Jul	Chạy nhanh lên (Run Faster!)	1	VTV Film Prod.	Nguyễn Hữu Luyện (director); Phạm Văn Quý, Thu Hường (writers); Minh Vượng, Văn Hiệp, Xuân Thức, Thu Hương, Diệp Bích, Hoa Mai, Quốc Dũng...		Comedy	
6 Aug	Tìm cha (Finding Dad)	1	VTV Film Prod.	Triệu Tuấn (director); Nguyễn Quyến (writer); Phạm Đình Chiến, Hồng Giang, Tuyết Sơn, Hồng Chương, Kim Xuyến, Vân Đoàn, Thanh Vân, Xuân Mai, Thùy Linh, Thế Tuấn, Sỹ Tự, Hà Tuấn, Hữu Hinh, Mai Hòa, Xuân Chanh...		Drama, Family	Adapted from short story of the same name by Lê Thanh Huệ
13 Aug-3 Sep	Xóm bờ sông (Riverside Hamlet)	4	VTV Film Prod.	Hữu Mười (director); Thiên Phúc, Hoàng Nhuận Cầm (writers); Hương Hạnh, Phương Minh, Đồng Mai, Nguyễn Thị Trang, Hà Duy, Hồng Minh, Hồng Kỳ, Phương Thảo, Đào Văn Tùng, Quang Thiện, Quang Long, Phương Thúy, Quang Thắng...	'Xóm bờ sông' theme song by Diệu Linh & Thục Anh	Drama, Slice-of-Life, Children	Adapted from Thọ Vân's short story 'Những đứa trẻ ngoài bến sông'
10 Sep-1 Oct	Dòng sông chảy xiết (Fast Flowing River)	4	VTV Film Prod.	Bùi Huy Thuần (director); Đào Phương Liên (writer); Mai Hương, Đình Thắng, Anh Huy, Khánh Việt, Hồ Trung, Ngọc Linh, Hà Văn Trọng, Thu Hiền, Trần Đức, Quế Hằng, Trần Hạnh, Ngọc Tản, Việt Trung, Anh Quân, Thanh Quý...	'Dòng sông chảy xiết' theme song by Lê Vành Khuyên	Drama	Adapted from short story 'Bốn bước đến chân trời' by Nguyễn Hiếu
8-29 Oct	Tình yêu có bao giờ sai (Has Love Ever Been Wrong?)	4 (70′)	VTV Film Prod.	Vũ Hồng Sơn (director); Phạm Văn Khôi (writer); Xuân Trường, Hoàng Tuấn, Thu Quế, Tú Oanh, Mỹ Duyên, Thu Hà, Đức Long, Văn Hiệp, Dũng Nhi, Tuyết Liên, Bá Cường, Minh Nguyệt, Hữu Độ, Thành An, Kiều Minh Hiếu...		Romance, Drama	
5 Nov-10 Dec	Người nổi tiếng (The Fame)	6 (70′)	VTV Film Prod.	Bạch Diệp (director); Đỗ Trí Hùng (writer); Đức Sơn, Khánh Huyền, Mai Thu Huyền, Đình Chiến, Hoàng Kiên, Trần Hạnh, Tiến Đạt, Hà Văn Trọng, Lê Mai, Thu Hường, Văn Thành, Phú Thăng, Hữu Độ, Hoàng Anh Minh, Tiến Mộc, Quang Huy, Lê Công Tuấn, Anh Tuấn, Tiến Mạnh, Kim Bình, Xuân Cải, Phương Minh...	Tình ca mùa đông (Winter Love Song) by Hồng Hải	Marriage, Drama, Business	
17-24 Dec	Bi kịch chưa đặt tên (Unnamed Tragedy)	2	VTV Film Prod.	Đỗ Thanh Hải (director); Đoàn Lê, Thanh Hương (writers); Phạm Hồng Minh...		Drama	
31 Dec	Dải lụa (The Silk Ribbon)	1	VTV Film Prod.	Lê Cường Việt (director); Lê Hoàng Lê, Lê Cường Việt, Thùy Linh (writers); Như Quỳnh, Hà Văn Trọng, Phạm Cường, Đinh Ngọc Hà, Thùy Dương, Đào Hồng Cẩm...		Drama, Slice-of-Life, Romance, Religious	Based on short story of the same name by Dương Duy Ngữ

== See also ==
- List of dramas broadcast by Vietnam Television (VTV)
- List of dramas broadcast by Hanoi Radio Television (HanoiTV)
- List of dramas broadcast by Vietnam Digital Television (VTC)
