= Änglar och en massa kärlek =

Studio album by Arvingarna
- Released: 18 December 2013
- Genre: modern dansband music
- Label: Sony Music

Arvingarna chronology
Underbart (2009)	Änglar och en massa kärlek (2013)	Våra allra bästa (2017)

Änglar och en massa kärlek is a studio album by Arvingarna, released on the Sony Music label on 18 December 2013, consisting of a 2013 Beach party of the 2012 single "Semester". In 2014, the album was awarded a Guldklaven Award in the "Best album of the year" category.

== Track listing ==
#	Title	Writer	Length
1.	"Ta mig tillbaka nu"	F. Boström; A. Eise; A. Öberg	3.01
2.	"Alla rätt"	J. Dejevik	3.04
3.	"Efter vinter kommer vår"	M. Erlandsson; C. Andreasson	3.31
4.	"Hur ska det bli, hur ska det gå"	T. Berglund; U. Georgsson; T. Persson	3.15
5.	"Det kan du lita på"	L. E. Larsson; U. Georgsson	2.42
6.	"Louise"	M. Leiljonmarck	3.08
7.	"Ängel"	A. Larsson; L. Lundgren	3.38
8.	"Drivin'"	R. Greenaway; B. Mason	2.54
9.	"Det är lördag igen"	C. Janebrink; P. Samuelsson	3.00
10.	"Underbar dag"	M. Erlandsson; C. Andreasson; T. Wassenius	3.14
11.	"En ängel i varda'n"	T. Berglund; M. Wigström; P. Samuelsson	3.15
12.	"Finns det någon annan nu"	L. Lundgren	4.27
13.	"Semester (2013 Beach Party Version)"	Å. Noréen; L. E. Carlsson; A. Aspell	3.09

== Contributors ==
- Violin: Mattias Johansson
- Cello: David Bukovinszky
- String programming: Mattias Bylund
- Drums: Anders Hedlund
- Electric bass and acoustic guitar: Figge Boström
- Trumpet: Stefan Persson
- Saxophone: Wojtex Goral

== Charts ==
Chart (2014)	Peak position
Swedish Albums (Sverigetopplistan)	20
