= Rockin' around the Christmas Tree (album) =

Studio album by Arvingarna
- Released: 28 November 2007
- Genre: Christmas, modern dansband music
- Label: Mariann Grammofon
- Producer: Gert Lengstrand, Mats Persson

Arvingarna chronology
All Included (2007)	Rockin' around the Christmas Tree (2007)	Upp till dans (2009)

Rockin' around the Christmas Tree is a Christmas album by Arvingarna and was released on 28 November 2007. The album was produced by Gert Lengstrand, who together with Lasse Holm wrote the final track "Det lyser en stjärna", and Mats "MP" Persson from Gyllene Tider. The album charted for four weeks on the Swedish Albums Chart, peaking at number 42 in week 49 of 2007.

== Track listing ==
1. Rockin' around the Christmas Tree
2. Please Come Home for Christmas
3. Jingle Bell Rock
4. I Saw Mommy Kissing Santa Claus
5. Santa Claus is Coming to Town
6. Walking in My Winter Wonderland
7. White Christmas
8. Rudolph the Rednosed Reindeer
9. Christmas [Baby Please Come Home]
10. Merry Christmas Baby
11. Oh Holy Night
12. Det lyser en stjärna

== Charts ==
Chart (2007)	Peak position
Sweden (Sverigetopplistan)	42
