= Roger Pontare =

Swedish musician (born 1951)

Fred Roger Pontare
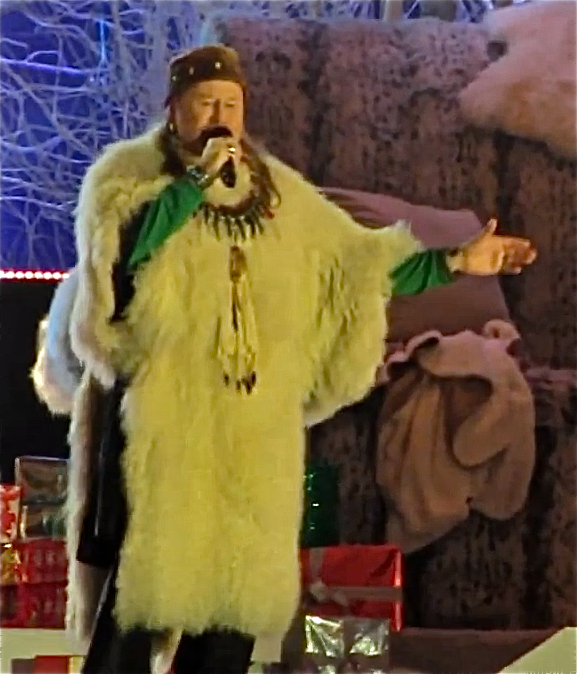
- Roger Pontare

Background information
- Birth name: Roger Johansson
- Born: 17 October 1951 (age 73); Slagnäs, Sweden
- Genres: Folk pop Schlager
- Occupation: Singer
- Years active: 1976–present

Fred Roger Pontare (born Roger Johansson; 17 October 1951) is a Swedish musician. He lives in Bjuråker in Hudiksvalls kommun.

Pontare was born in Arjeplog Municipality, and is of Sami descent. He has represented Sweden twice in the Eurovision Song Contest, in 1994 (duet with Marie Bergman) with "Stjärnorna" and in 2000 with "When Spirits Are Calling My Name", placing 13th and 7th, respectively. In 2018, he participated in the Swedish TV-show Stjärnornas stjärna broadcast on TV4.

== Personal life ==
Roger Pontare is father to Viktor and Vincent Pontare. The latter is well known singer songwriter with the mononym Vincent and as Vargas as part of the duo Vargas & Lagola.

== Discography ==
=== Albums ===
Year	Album	Chart positions	Certification
Year	Album	SWE	Certification
1995	Sinatrafied	—	
1995	Julens sånger	—	
1999	Som av Is	—	
2000	När vindarna viskar mitt namn	39	
2000	When Spirits Are Calling My Name	—	
2000	I vargens spår	9	GLF: Gold
2002	Den stora friheten	—	
2006	Från Stjärnorna till Silverland	37	
2011	Mitt vinterland	—	

=== Singles ===
Title	Year	Peak chart positions	Certifications	Album
Title	Year	SWE	Certifications	Album
"Christmastime is Here Again"	1988	—		Non-album singles
"Silverbarn"	1990	—		Non-album singles
"Stjärnorna" (with Marie Bergman)	1994	—		Non-album singles
"Som av Is"	1999	—		Som av Is
"Cold as Ice"	1999	—		Som av Is
"När vindarna viskar mitt namn"	2000	2	GLF: Platinum	När vindarna viskar mitt namn
"When Spirits Are Calling My Name"	2000	—		When Spirits Are Calling My Name
"Silverland"	2006	31		Från Stjärnorna till Silverland
"Himmel och hav"	2017	100		Non-album single
"—" denotes a single that did not chart or was not released in that territory.

Preceded by Charlotte Nilsson with "Take Me to Your Heaven"	Sweden in the Eurovision Song Contest; 2000	Succeeded by Friends with "Listen To Your Heartbeat"
Preceded by Arvingarna with "Eloise"	Sweden in the Eurovision Song Contest (with Marie Bergman); 1994	Succeeded by Jan Johansen with "Se på mej"
