= The Ultimate Entertainer =

- Also known as: The Ultimate Entertainer
- Vietnamese: Tuyệt đỉnh tranh tài
- Hán-Nôm: 絕頂爭才
- Literal meaning: The Ultimate Entertainer
- Presented by: Trấn Thành
- Starring: various
- Country of origin: Vietnam
- Original language: Vietnamese
- No. of seasons: 1
- No. of episodes: 12

Production
- Running time: ~ 120 minutes, including commercial
- Production companies: Endemol; Đông Tây Promotion

Original release
- Network: HTV
- Release: April 19, 2014 – present

Related
- Stjernekamp

Tuyệt đỉnh tranh tài is a Vietnamese vocal/singing competition between recording artists, airing on HTV7 at 9:00 pm (UTC+7) prime time slot every Saturdays. The show premiered on April 19, 2014, with Huỳnh Trấn Thành serving as the host. Lê Hoàng is a permanent judge on judging panel, joined by diva Hồng Nhung for the first six weeks of the show and by Ý Lan for the rest of eleven weeks. Also, there is the third guest judge spot to fill. The winner of the show might take home 400,000,000 VND in cash (roughly $18,800). The first season includes 12 episodes. Contestants of the show are known artists in different music genres.

== Format ==
In time of the show, artists have to adapt one genre each week. They are learning choreography routines, preparing for music style change, rehearsing with music producers and movement coaches etc. so as to capture correct visuals of the music genre. Three judges then give advice for artists' performances and voting lines are open only after all the performances are done. Audience have ten minutes and five messages at most to vote for their favorite. One artist must leave the competition at the end of the night, while the rest is moving on to the next live show until top 2 are determined. On final round, top 2 perform six solo performances. The artist who receive the most vote will be crown the winner, take home the title The Ultimate Entertainer, 400,000,000 VND in cash and so on. The runner-up will earn himself 200,000,000 VND as well.

== Original seasons ==
Season	Start date	End date	Artists	Episodes
1	April 19, 2014	July 5, 2014	10	12
2	April 18, 2015	July 4, 2015	10	12

=== Season 1 ===
The Ultimate Entertainer
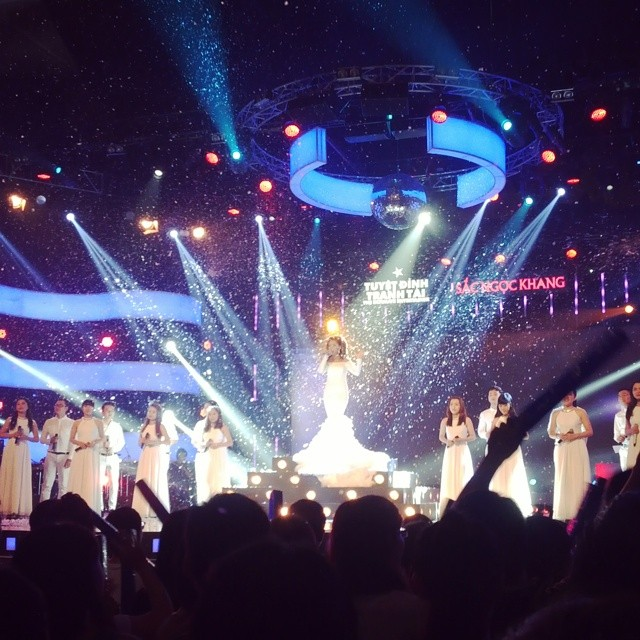
- Phương Vy, season one winner
- Hosted by: Trấn Thành
- Judges: Lê Hoàng; Hồng Nhung; Ý Lan
- Winner: Nguyễn Ngọc Phương Vy
- Runner-up: Nguyễn Hoàng Hải

Release
- Original release: 19 April – 5 July 2014

Tuyệt đỉnh tranh tài 2014 is the first season of Tuyệt đỉnh tranh tài, a Vietnamese adaptation of Stjernekamp/The Ultimate Entertainer franchise. The show is a vocal/singing competition between recording artists, airing on HTV7 at 9:00 pm (UTC+7) prime time slot every Saturdays. It premiered April 19 and is set to conclude on July 5, 2014, with Huỳnh Trấn Thành serving as the host. Lê Hoàng is a permanent judge on judging panel, joined by diva Hồng Nhung for the first six weeks of the show and by Ý Lan for the rest of eleven weeks. Also, there is the third guest judge spot to fill. The winner of the show might take home 400,000,000 VND in cash (roughly $18,800). The first season includes 12 episodes (1 showcase episode, 9 live shows, 1 grand finale and 1 recap episode). Contestants of the show are known artists in different music genres.

==== Participating artists ====
Recording artist	Music genre	Voting Number	Status
Trà My	Dance	06	Off-Voted 1st on May 3, 2014
Minh Thư	Alternative rock	04	Off-Voted 1st on May 3, 2014
Kimmese	Hip hop, R&B	03	Off-Voted 3rd on May 10, 2014
Ưng Hoàng Phúc	V-Pop	01	Withdrew on May 17, 2014
Phạm Thu Hà	Classical/Opera	09	Off-Voted 5th on May 31, 2014
Đức Tuấn	Broadway	02	Off-Voted 6th on May 31, 2014
Phạm Anh Khoa	Rock	07	Off-Voted 7th on June 7, 2014
Trang Nhung	Folk/Contemporary	05	Off-Voted 8th on June 14, 2014
Hoàng Hải	V-Pop	08	Runner-Up on June 28, 2014
Phương Vy	Pop Ballad/Jazz	10	Winner

==== Elimination chart ====
Week:		2	3	2 + 3 ^{3}	4	5	6	7	6 + 7 ^{4}	8	9	10	11
Theme:		Rock; 4/26	90s Pop; 5/3	N/A	Dance; 5/10	Folk; 5/17	Latin; 5/24	RnB; 5/31	N/A	Musical/Jazz; 6/7	Soul/Disco; 6/14	N/A; 6/21	N/A; 6/28
Rotating Judge:		Hồng Nhung						Ý Lan					
3rd Guest Judge:		Lê Quang	Phương Thanh	—N/a	Huy Tuấn	Nguyễn Cường	Mỹ Linh	Huy Tuấn	—N/a	Anh Quân	Thanh Bùi	Đức Huy	Hồng Nhung
Place	Participant	Result											
1	Phương Vy			—N/a	Judge's Fave		Judges' Fave	Judge's Fave	—N/a	Judge's Fave		Advanced	Winner
2	Hoàng Hải	Judges' Fave	Judge's Fave	—N/a				Judge's Fave	—N/a	Judge's Fave		Advanced	Runner-Up
3	Trang Nhung	Judge's Fave		—N/a			Fan's Fave		—N/a		Voted Off		
4	Phạm Anh Khoa		Judge's Fave	—N/a	Judge's Fave		Favorite ^{5}	Judge's Fave	—N/a	Voted Off ^{6}			
5	Đức Tuấn	Bottom		—N/a	Judge's Fave	Judge's Fave			Voted Off				
6	Phạm Thu Hà		Bottom	—N/a		Judges' Fave			Voted Off				
7	Ưng Hoàng Phúc	Bottom		—N/a		Withdrew							
8	Kimmese			—N/a	Voted Off								
9-10	Trà My	Bottom	Bottom	Voted Off									
9-10	Minh Thư		Bottom	Voted Off									
Lê Hoàng's Pick:		Hoàng Hải	Hoàng Hải	N/A	Đức Tuấn	Phạm Thu Hà	Phương Vy	Phương Vy	N/A	Phạm Anh Khoa	N/A		
Hồng Nhung/Ý Lan's Pick:		Hoàng Hải	Phạm Anh Khoa	N/A	Phương Vy	Đức Tuấn	Phương Vy	Hoàng Hải	N/A	Hoàng Hải	N/A		
3rd Guest Judge's Pick:		Trang Nhung	—N/a	N/A	Phạm Anh Khoa	Phạm Thu Hà	Phương Vy & Anh Khoa	Phạm Anh Khoa	N/A	Phương Vy	N/A		

- ^Note 3 The results from week 2 and 3 determined two of participants to be leaving the competition.
- ^Note 4 The results from week 6 and 7 determined two of participants to be leaving the competition.
- ^Note 5 Favorite contestant of both judge and audience.
- ^Note 6 Favorite contestant of judge was voted off by audience.

=== Season 2 ===
The Ultimate Entertainer
- Hosted by: Trấn Thành

Release
- Original release: 18 April – 4 July 2015

Tuyệt đỉnh tranh tài 2015 is the second season of Tuyệt đỉnh tranh tài, following success of the first season. The show is a vocal/singing competition between recording artists, which is set to air HTV7 at 9:00 pm (UTC+7) prime time slot every Saturdays. It premiered April 18 and is set to conclude on July 4, 2015, with Huỳnh Trấn Thành serving as the host once more time. Each week, it had a guest host alongside Trấn Thành. The jury have not been introduced yet before April 14, 2015.

==== Participating artists ====
Recording artist	Music genre	Voting Number	Status
Đinh Mạnh Ninh	V-Pop	02	Off-Voted 1st on May 2, 2015
Bùi Nguyễn Trung Quân	V-Pop	10	Off-Voted 2nd on May 2, 2015
Nguyễn Đình Thanh Tâm	Folk/Contemporary	01	Off-Voted 3rd/4th on May 16, 2015
Trần Vũ Hà My	Rock	04	Off-Voted 3rd/4th on May 16, 2015
Tuấn Khanh	Hard/Alternative rock	07	Off-Voted 5th on May 23, 2015
Nguyễn Thị Thảo Trang	V-Pop/Dance	06	Off-Voted but Saved on May 9, 2015; Re – Off-Voted on May 30, 2015
Thái Trinh	V-Pop	03	Off-Voted 7th on June 6, 2015
Huỳnh Minh Thuỷ	V-Pop	09	Off-Voted 8th on June 13, 2015
Nguyễn Hải Yến	Pop Ballad	05	Runner-Up on June 27, 2015
Nguyễn Hoàng Tôn	Hip hop, R&B	08	Winner

==== Elimination chart (season 2) ====
Week:		1	2	3	4	5	6	7	8	9	10
Theme:		Freestyle	Pop; 4/25	Rock; 5/2	Disco; 5/9	Bolero & Folk-Inspired; 5/16	RnB & Hip-hop; 5/23	Dance; 5/30	Latin & Jazz; 6/6	Musical & Remix; 6/13	N/A; 6/20
3rd Guest Judge:		None	Huy Tuấn	Trần Lập	Nguyễn Hưng	Nguyễn Cường	Lưu Thiên Hương	Nguyễn Hải Phong	Anh Quân	Hà Trần	Đức Huy
Place	Participant	Result ^{7}									
1	Nguyễn Hoàng Tôn		Judge's Fave					Bottom ^{9}		Advanced	Winner
2	Nguyễn Thị Hải Yến		Judge's Fave							Advanced	Runner Up
3	Huỳnh Minh Thuỷ					Judges' Fave				Voted Off ^{6}	
4	Nguyễn Thị Thái Trinh				Judges' Fave				Voted Off ^{6}		
5	Nguyễn Thị Thảo Trang		Judge's Fave	Judges' Fave	Voted Off / Saved ^{8}	Bottom	Bottom ^{9}	Voted Off ^{6}			
6	Tuấn Khanh			Judge's Fave			Voted Off				
7-8	Trần Vũ Hà My				Bottom	Voted Off					
7-8	Nguyễn Đình Thanh Tâm					Voted Off					
9	Bùi Nguyễn Trung Quân			Voted Off							
10	Đinh Mạnh Ninh			Voted Off							
Hồng Nhung's Pick:		N/A	Hoàng Tôn	Thảo Trang	Thái Trinh	Huỳnh Minh Thuỷ	Thảo Trang	Thảo Trang	Thái Trinh		N/A
Phương Uyên's Pick:		N/A	Thảo Trang	Thảo Trang	Thái Trinh	Huỳnh Minh Thuỷ	Thảo Trang	Hoàng Tôn	Thái Trinh		N/A
3rd Guest Judge's Pick:		N/A	Nguyễn Hải Yến	Tuấn Khanh	Thái Trinh	Huỳnh Minh Thuỷ	Thảo Trang	Thảo Trang	Thái Trinh		N/A

- ^Note 6 Favorite contestant of judge(s) was voted off by audience.
- ^Note 7 The results of participants to be leaving the competition, are based on the audience voting of the previous week.
- ^Note 8 Contestant was voted off (by the audience), but was saved unanimously by judges.
- ^Note 9 Contestant landed in the Bottom 2 (by the audience vote), and was judges' favorite.

== Syndication ==
Season 1
No.	Air Date	Title	Notes
01	April 19, 2014	Live show 1: Freestyle	Top 10 showcase
02	April 26, 2014	Live show 2: Rock	Non-elimination
03	May 3, 2014	Live show 3: '90s Pop	Double elimination
04	May 10, 2014	Live show 4: Dance	Top 8 perform
05	May 17, 2014	Live show 5: Folk song	Top 7 perform
06	May 24, 2014	Live show 6: Latin	Non-elimination
07	May 31, 2014	Live show 7: R&B	Double-elimination
08	June 7, 2014	Live show 8: Musical & Jazz	Top 4 perform
09	June 14, 2014	Live show 9: Soul & Disco	Top 3 perform
10	June 21, 2014	Final	Top 2 perform
11	June 28, 2014	Grand finale	Winner crowning
12	July 5, 2014	Rewind	Best of the season
