= Looky Looky =

1969 song written and performed by Giorgio Moroder

"Looky, Looky" is a 1969 song written and performed by Giorgio Moroder as "Giorgio". The song sold over a million copies and was awarded a gold disc in October 1970.

It was with "Looky, Looky", and as a singer, that Moroder first gained popularity. The song, whose sound was compared to The Beach Boys, is very distinct from the disco and synth sounds Moroder later created as songwriter and record producer.

Moroder performed the lyrics and all of the instruments all by himself. Only the song’s chorus words (inspired from the song "Papa-Oom-Mow-Mow" by The Rivingtons) are performed by Moroder's long time friend singer and co-performer Michael Holm. Allegedly, he offered his services in return for a big steak.

== Chart performance ==
Chart (1969–70)	Peak position
Belgium (Ultratop 50 Flanders)	16
Belgium (Ultratop 50 Wallonia)	4
West Germany (GfK)	26
Switzerland (Schweizer Hitparade)	3
