= The Golden Key (2001 film) =

2000 film by Lê Hoàng

- Directed by: Lê Hoàng
- Written by: Đoàn Minh Tuấn
- Starring: Mỹ Duyên; Tạ Ngọc Bảo
- Cinematography: Phạm Hoàng Nam
- Edited by: Kim Hoàng
- Music by: Quốc Trung
- Production company: Giải Phóng Film Productions
- Release date: 2001
- Running time: 85 minutes
- Country: Vietnam
- Language: Vietnamese

The Golden Key (Vietnamese: Chiếc chìa khoá vàng) is a 2001 Vietnamese romantic war film directed by Lê Hoàng. It was well received by critics.
