= Casper Janebrink =

Swedish musician (born 1970)

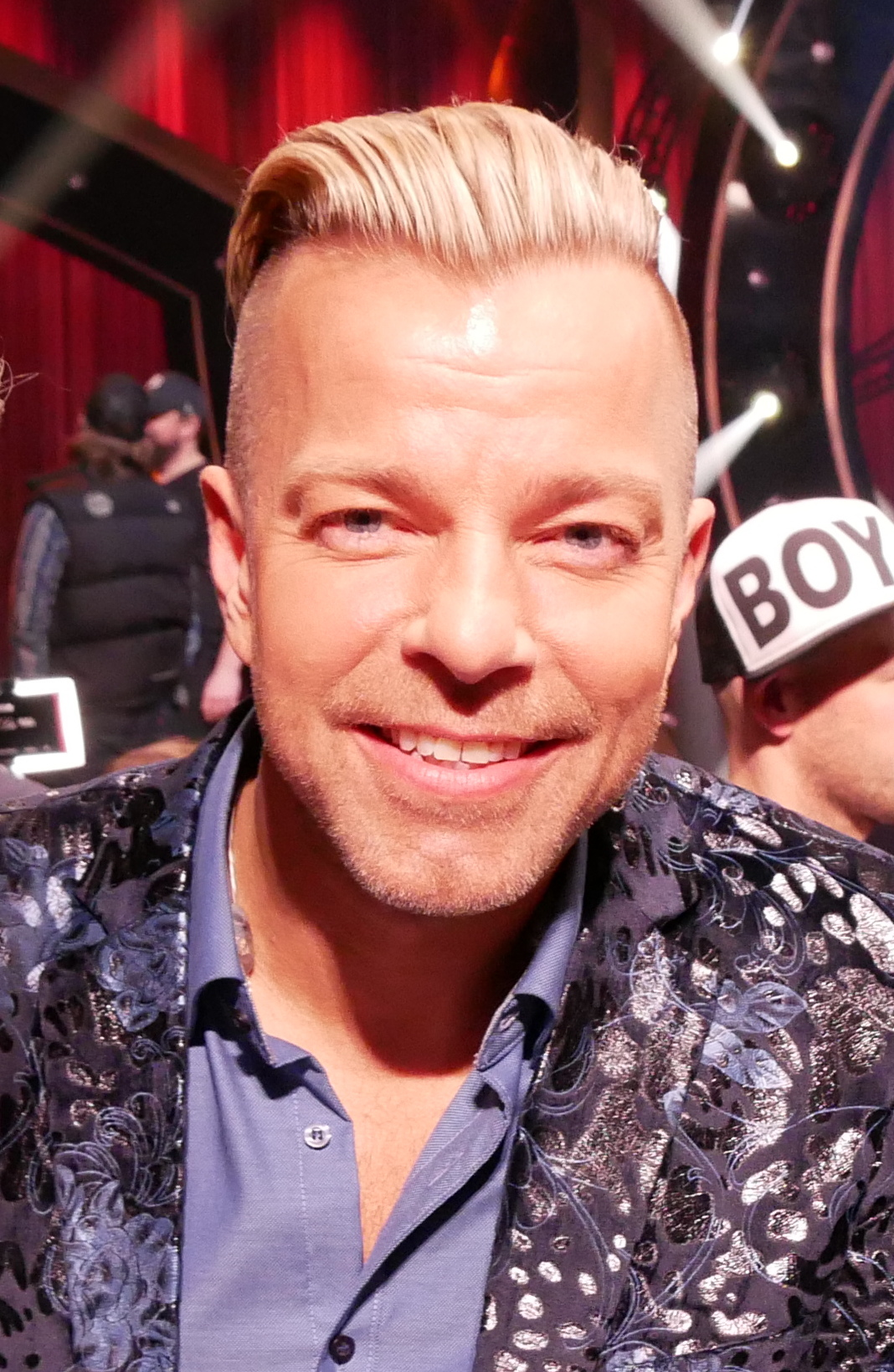
- Janebrink in 2019

Background information
- Born: Dennis Casper Janebrink; 2 January 1970 (age 55); Gothenburg, Sweden
- Occupations: Singer; songwriter; musician
- Musical career
- Genres: Dansband
- Instruments: Vocals; bass guitar
- Member of: Arvingarna; Björnzone

Dennis Casper Janebrink (born 2 January 1970) is a Swedish singer, songwriter and musician. He is the lead vocalist and primary lyricist of dansband Arvingarna.

Casper Janebrink is the son of Dennis Janebrink and Ing-Marie (1949-2025). He grew up in Partille.

In 1993, the Arvingarna song "Eloise" won Melodifestivalen. With Arvingarna, he has participated at Melodifestivalen five times.

In 2011, he participated in Körslaget with a choir from his home municipality of Partille. In 2018 he won Stjärnornas stjärna, which aired over TV4. He presented Bingolotto on 7 February 2016.
