= Eloise (Arvingarna song) =

1993 song by Arvingarna

Single by Arvingarna
- Language: Swedish
- Released: 1993
- Composer: Lasse Holm
- Lyricist: Gert Lengstrand

Eurovision Song Contest 1993 entry
- Country: Sweden
- Artists: Casper Janebrink; Kim Carlsson; Tommy Carlsson; Lars Larsson
- As: Arvingarna
- Language: Swedish
- Composer: Lasse Holm
- Lyricist: Gert Lengstrand
- Conductor: Curt-Eric Holmquist

Finals performance
- Final result: 7th
- Final points: 89

Entry chronology
- ◄ "I morgon är en annan dag" (1992)
- "Stjärnorna" (1994) ►

"Eloise" is a Swedish-language song written by Gert Lengstrand and Lasse Holm and performed by Swedish dansband Arvingarna. It won the Melodifestivalen 1993 and finished 7th representing Sweden in the Eurovision Song Contest 1993. The song had been one of the favourites to win that year. The highest sets of points, 10, came from Belgium, Austria and Israel, adding up to a total of 89 points.

The song text describes a man who wants to know if a woman called Eloise is more than a friend.

The single peaked at #7 at the Swedish singles chart. At Svensktoppen, the song stayed for 10 weeks with a second place as best result there.

== Cover versions ==
- Swedish heavy metal band Black Ingvars covered the song on their 1995 album Earcandy Six.
- Sandins performed the song at Dansbandskampen 2008.
- Timo Räisänen performed the song during Melodifestivalen 2010.

== See also ==
- "Elenore", 1968 song by American pop-rock group The Turtles, which Arvingarna covered on their 1992 album Coola killar.

== Charts ==
Chart (1993)	Peak position
Sweden (Sverigetopplistan)	7

Preceded by "I morgon är en annan dag" by Christer Björkman	Melodifestivalen winners 1993	Succeeded by "Stjärnorna" by Marie Bergman and Roger Pontare
