= Lê Hoàng =

Vietnamese film director and screenwriter

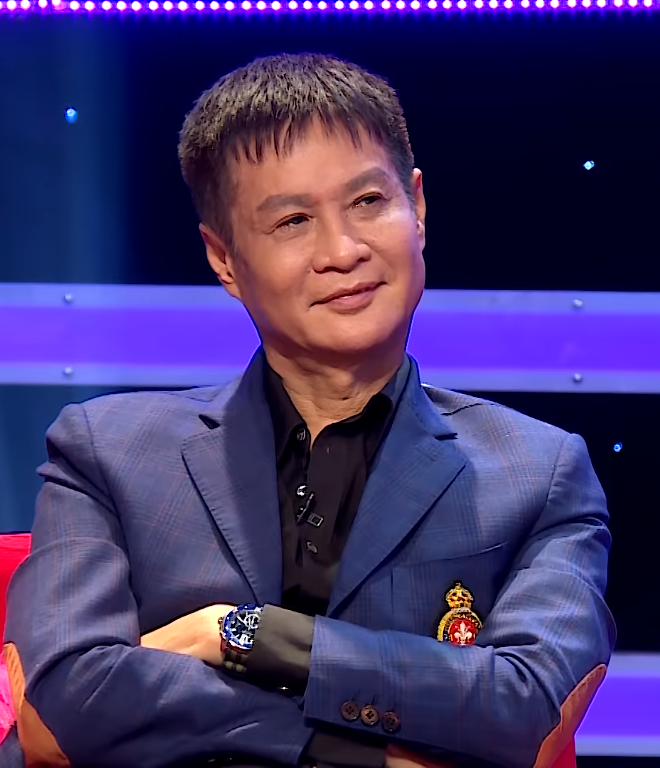
Lê Hoàng

Lê Hoàng (黎煌; born 20 January 1956 in Hanoi) is a Vietnamese film director and screenwriter.

In 1998, he directed the film Ai xuôi vạn lý, which he won several awards for including at the Rotterdam International Film Festival.

His 2000 film, Chiec chia khoa vang, was a romantic war film.

== Filmography ==
1995 - Lưỡi dao Le Couteau
1998 - Ai xuôi vạn lý
2000 - Chiếc chìa khóa vàng
2003 - Gái nhảy
2024 - Trà
