= Arvingarna =

Swedish dansband

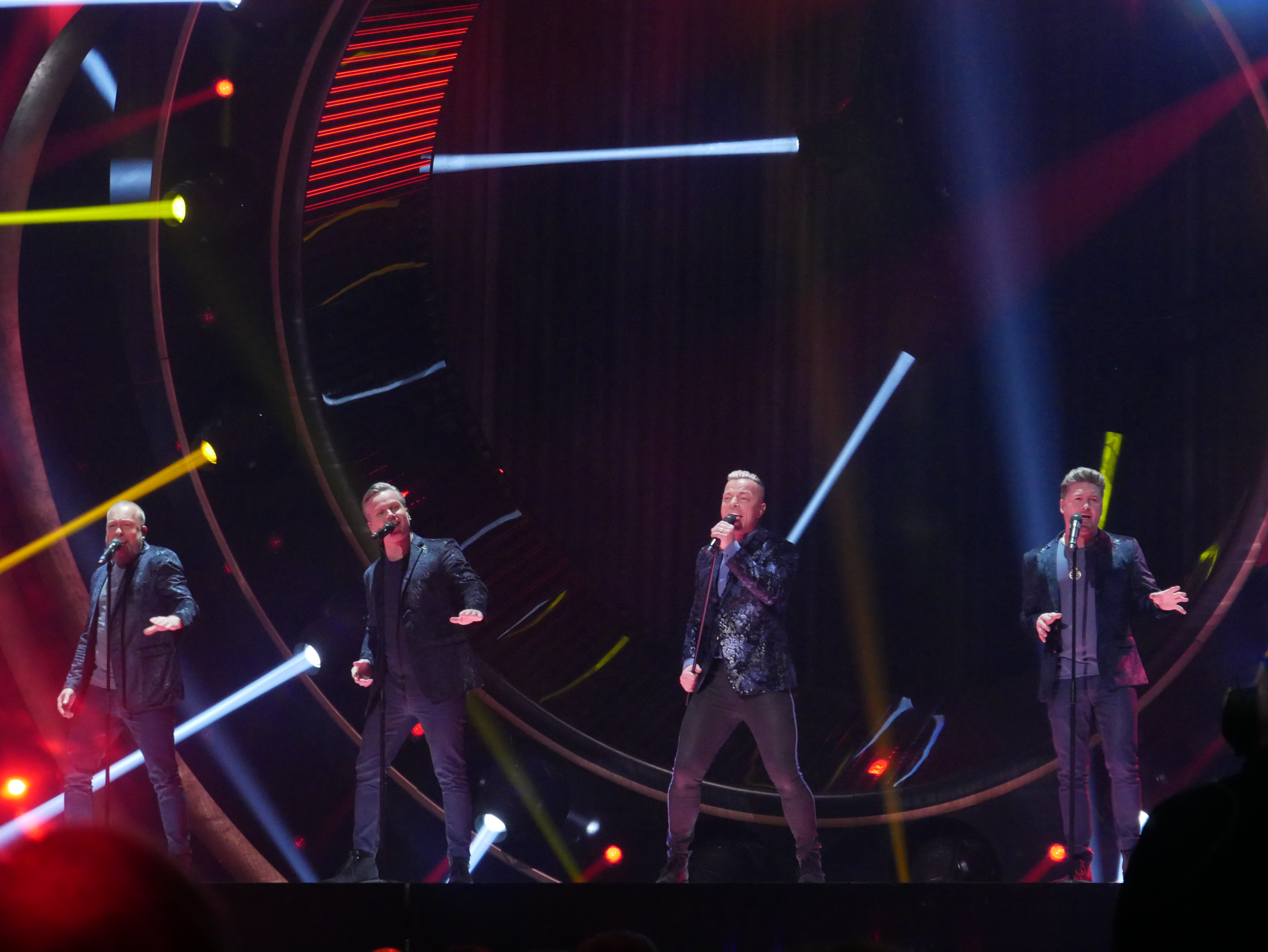
- Arvingarna performing in March 2019, from left to right: Tommy Carlsson, Lars Larsson, Casper Janebrink and Kim Carlsson

Background information
- Origin: Gothenburg, Sweden
- Genres: Dansband
- Years active: 1989–present
- Labels: Sony
- Members: Casper Janebrink; Lars Larsson; Kim Carlsson; Tommy Carlsson
- Website: arvingarna.nu

Arvingarna is a Swedish dansband formed in Gothenburg in 1989. The group consists of Casper Janebrink (vocals and bass guitar), Lars Larsson (guitars, vocals and keyboards), Kim Carlsson (vocals and guitars) and Tommy Carlsson (drums and vocals). At Melodifestivalen 1993, they performed the song '"Eloise", which won, allowing Arvingarna to represent Sweden in the Eurovision Song Contest in Millstreet Co. Cork in May that year, where the song finished 7th.

== History ==
Arvingarna was founded in 1989, following the members earlier having played heavy metal, without any major successes. The band's name ("The heirs") refers to the group member's parents, who also were active in dansbands. Arvingarna plays a form of dansband music that is it inspired by pop music and rock music, and has also being described as a boyband.

The band has competed in the Swedish Melodifestivalen in 1993, 1995, 1999, 2002, 2019, 2021 and 2025.

In 2019 they participated in Melodifestivalen 2019 with the song "I Do", where they placed 7th in the final scoring 64 points. The band returned two years later and participated in Melodifestivalen 2021 with the song "Tänker inte alls gå hem" taking part in the first heat on 6 February 2021 where they qualified directly for the finale. The finale was held on 13 March 2021 at the Annexet in Stockholm. Arvingarna finished 9th in the final with a total of 44 points.

== Personnel ==
The members of the Arvingarna are:

- Casper Janebrink – vocals, bass (1989–present)
- Lars Larsson – guitars, vocals, keyboards (1989–present)
- Kim Carlsson – vocals, guitars (1989–present)
- Tommy Carlsson – drums, vocals (1989–present)

== Discography ==
=== Albums ===
Year	Album	Peak positions
Year	Album	SWE
1992	Coola killar	49
1993	Eloise	7
1994	Tjejer	9
1995	För alltid	14
1997	Nya spår	41
1998	Airplane	–
1999	Lime	13
2001	Diamanter	17
2005	#8	23
2007	Rockin' Around the Christmas Tree	42
2009	Underbart	35
2009	Arvingarna upp till dans	35
2009	Änglar och en massa kärlek	20
2019	I Do	4
2020	När snön faller ner	8
2021	Tänker inte alls gå hem	2
2022	Klart det ska bli jul	1

Compilation albums

Year	Album	Peak positions
Year	Album	SWE
2002	Collection	–
2007	All Included - Arvingarnas största hits från 1992-2007	26
2017	Våra allra bästa	14

=== Singles ===
Year	Title	Peak positions	Album
Year	Title	SWE	Album
1996	Då & nu	38	
1993	"Eloise"	10	Eloise
1995	"Bo Diddley"	21	För alltid
1997	"Pamela"	2	Nya spår
1999	"Det svär jag på"	39	Lime
2005	"Hon kommer med sommaren"	52	#8
2019	"I Do"	6	Melodifestivalen 2019
2020	"Säg att du är min"	—	Tänker inte alls gå hem
2021	"Tänker inte alls gå hem"	24	Tänker inte alls gå hem
2021	"Sommar igen"	—	Tänker inte alls gå hem
2021	"Som jag hade dig förut"	— (Note: "Som jag hade dig förut" did not enter the Swedish Singles Chart, but peaked at number 11 on the Swedish Heatseeker chart.)	Så mycket bättre
2021	"Soluppgång"	—	Så mycket bättre
2021	"Prinsessan"	—	Så mycket bättre
2022	"Dröm om December"	51	Klart det ska bli jul
2022	"Klart det ska bli jul"	54	Klart det ska bli jul
2022	"Önska god jul till varann"	97	Klart det ska bli jul
2024	"Då lackar det mot jul igen"	— (Note: "Då lackar det mot jul igen" did not enter the Swedish Singles Chart, but peaked at number four on the Swedish Heatseeker chart.)	Klart det ska bli jul
2024	"Nu är det jul"	58	Klart det ska bli jul
2025	"Ring Baby Ring"	52	Non-album single

== Citations ==
Awards and achievements
Preceded by Christer Björkman with "I morgon är en annan dag"	Sweden in the Eurovision Song Contest; 1993	Succeeded by Marie Bergman and Roger Pontare with "Stjärnorna"
