= 2018 Kite Awards =

Vietnamese cinema awards event

2018 Kite Awards (26th VCA Awards)
- Date: April 12, 2019
- Site: Army Theatre in Southern Region, Tân Bình District, Ho Chi Minh City
- Hosted by: Hồng Phúc, Thùy Linh
- Organised by: Vietnam Cinema Association

Highlights
- Most wins: Film: My Mr. Wife (3)
- Golden Kite: Film: My Mr. Wife; Television: Quỳnh the Doll; Across the River
- Silver Kite: Film: Song Lang; Television: Love Stories in the Land of Birch

Television/radio coverage
- Network: VTV2

The 2018 Kite Awards (Vietnamese: Giải Cánh diều 2018) is the 26th edition of Vietnam Cinema Association Awards, also the 17th edition since the award is officially named Kite. It honored the best in Vietnam film, television works of 2018. The ceremony was broadcast live on April 12, 2019, from the Army Theatre in Southern Region, Tân Bình District, Ho Chi Minh City beginning at 20:00. The ceremony aired live on VTV2 channel in Vietnam.

This year, a total of 144 film works from 50 film production units participated in the award, including: 14 feature films, 10 TV drama series, 3 TV single-episode drama, 61 documentaries, 14 science films, 14 animated films, 26 short films and two film studies. The organizers accept remake films based on foreign scripts, except for the best screenplay category. The shortlist of nominees was announced in the award ceremony right before the winner was declared.

My Mr. Wife were the most nominated with four, later ended up winning three, including Golden Kite Award for Best Feature Film. In television, Quỳnh the Doll and Across the River tied for the Golden Kite Award. Across the River were the most nominated with three.

== Winner and nominees ==
Winners are listed first, highlighted in boldface, with a dagger (†) indicating the shortlist nominees for the Golden Kite.

- Highlighted title indicates Golden Kite for the Best Film/Drama/Study winner(s).
- Highlighted title indicates Silver Kite for the Second Best Film/Drama/Study winner(s).
- Highlighted title indicates Film/Drama/Study(s) received the Certificate of Merit.
  - Other nominees

=== Feature film ===
**Best Film**
**My Mr. Wife** †; **Song Lang** †; **Super Star Super Silly** †; **11 Hopes**; **Where We Don't Belong**; **100 Days of Sunshine**; Season for Love Songs; Daddy Issues; Murder in the Lens; Trạng Quỳnh; The Perfect Wedding; Go-Go Sisters; The Immortal; Forget Me Not
**Best Director**	**Best Screenplay**
**Charlie Nguyễn – My Mr. Wife**	**Super Star Super Silly – Đỗ Đức Thịnh**
**Best Leading Actor**	**Best Leading Actress**
**Liên Bỉnh Phát – Song Lang as Dũng "Thiên Lôi"**; Trường Giang – Super Star Super Silly as Thế Sơn & Thế Tùng	**Hoàng Yến Chibi – Go-Go Sisters as young Hiểu Phương**; Phương Anh Đào – My Mr. Wife as Mai
**Best Supporting Actor**	**Best Supporting Actress**
**Hoàng Phi – 11 Hopes as Hùng**; Đỗ Đức Thịnh – Super Star Super Silly as Trung Dũng	**Thanh Trúc – My Mr. Wife as Ngọc**; Thanh Tú – The Immortal as An
**Best Cinematography**	**Best Art Design**
**Bob Nguyễn – Song Lang**	**Lê Ngọc Quốc Bảo – Go-Go Sisters**
**Best Original Score**	**Best Sound Design**
**Dương Khắc Linh – Trạng Quỳnh**	not awarded

==== Multiple wins ====
The following films received multiple wins:

Wins	Films
3	My Mr. Wife
2	Song Lang
2	Go-Go Sisters

==== Multiple nominations ====
The following films received multiple nominations:

Wins	Films
4	My Mr. Wife
4	Super Star Super Silly
2	Song Lang
2	Go-Go Sisters

=== Television film ===
**Best Drama**
**Quỳnh the Doll** **(VTV)** †; **Across the River** **(HTV)** †; **Love Stories in the Land of Birch** **(VTV)** †; **Sumptuous Dream** **(VTV)**; **The Epic Song By the River** (Note: Single-episode drama) **(THP)**; **Under the Distant Sky** **(VTV)**; Yellow Rose Code (THVL); Sticky Rice and Plain Rice (HTV); Born in the Year of Pig (HTV); Life of Love and Feud (VTV); Those Days We Fell in Love (VTV); Amazing Blue Sea (HTV); Duyên định kim tiền (TodayTV)
**Best Director**	**Best Screenplay**
**Nguyễn Khải Anh – Those Days We Fell in Love**	**Across the River – Minh Diệu, Ngô Hoàng Giang**
**Best Leading Actor**	**Best Leading Actress**
**Nhan Phúc Vinh – Those Days We Fell in Love as Tùng**; Mạnh Trường – Life of Love and Feud as Đăng; Tạ Minh Tâm – Across the River as Lê Tuấn	**Kim Tuyến – Sumptuous Dream as Greta Trang**; Thúy Ngân – Sticky Rice and Plain Rice as Hân
**Best Supporting Actor**	**Best Supporting Actress**
**Bình An – Love Stories in the Land of Birch as young Quang**; Thanh Sơn – Life of Love and Feud as Khôi	**Phương Hằng – Sticky Rice and Plain Rice as Minh**; Ly Na Trang – Yellow Rose Code as An Hạ
**Best Cinematography**
**Nguyễn Khắc Huy – Sumptuous Dream**

==== Multiple wins ====
The following films received multiple wins:

Wins	Films
2	Across the River
2	Those Days We Fell in Love
2	Sumptuous Dream

==== Multiple nominations ====
The following films received multiple nominations:

Wins	Films
3	Across the River
2	Those Days We Fell in Love
2	Sumptuous Dream
2	Love Stories in the Land of Birch
2	Sticky Rice and Plain Rice
2	Life of Love and Feud

=== Animated film ===
**Best Film**
**The Secret of Duôn Cave** †; **Legend of Pongour Waterfalls** †; **Myth of Gióng** †; **Colour of the Windows**; **Miraculous Green Star**
**Best Director**	**Best Animator**
**Vũ Duy Khánh – The Secret of Duôn Cave**	**Bùi Mạnh Quang – Legend of Pongour Waterfalls**

==== Multiple wins ====
The following films received multiple wins:

Wins	Films
2	The Secret of Duôn Cave

=== Documentary film ===
**Best Film**
**Hãy nhớ bạn đang sống** †; **Những kẻ mộng mơ** †; **Joris Ivens và ngọn gió Việt Nam** †; **Khung hình tình bạn** †; **Hành trình hóa giải**; **Hương không tàn phai**; **Chơi vơi lưng chừng núi**
**Best Director**	**Best Cinematography**
**Đoàn Hồng Lê – Hãy nhớ bạn đang sống**	**Huỳnh Sỹ Cường, Phan Thanh Hùng – Những kẻ mộng mơ**

==== Multiple wins ====
The following films received multiple wins:

Wins	Films
2	Hãy nhớ bạn đang sống

=== Science film ===
**Best Film**
**Trầm cảm sau sinh** †; **Ô nhiễm nhựa ở biển** †; **Những cư dân của tự nhiên** †; **Khu bảo tồn thiên nhiên Xuân Liên** †
**Best Director**	**Best Cinematography**
**Đỗ Thị Huyền Trang, Trịnh Quang Tùng – Trầm cảm sau sinh**	**Triệu Văn Đô, Cao Xuân Ca, Vũ Hoài Nam – Những cư dân của tự nhiên**

==== Multiple wins ====
The following films received multiple wins:

Wins	Films
2	Trầm cảm sau sinh

=== Short film ===
**Best Film**
- **Mệ A** †
- **Len trâu** †
- **Xứ Đoài mây trắng** †
- **Một phi vụ nọ**
- **Sợi dây**
- **Những mảnh đời đá bạc**

=== Film critic/theory research ===
**Best Work**
- **Joris Ivens với cuộc chiến tranh nhân dân Việt Nam** **(Book) – Vietnam Film Institute** †
- **Điện ảnh Việt Nam: Những dòng sông đều chảy** **(Essay book) – Trần Việt Văn** †

== Ceremony ==
=== Presenters ===
The following individuals presented awards at the ceremony:

- Actor/model Bình Minh and singer/actress Cao Mỹ Kim with Best Supporting Actress/Actor - Television film
- Event organizer Đoàn Thúy Phương and actor Quyền Linh with Best Leading Actor/Actress - Television film
- Cinematographer Lý Thái Dũng and actress Khả Như with Golden Kite for Best Short film
- Director Lê Hồng Chương and actress Hạnh Thúy with Golden Kite for Best Documentary film & Best Science film
- Director Nguyễn Việt Hùng and singer Mi Trần with Best Director and Best Cinematography - Documentary film
- Director Nguyễn Như Vũ and actress Phạm Phương Hạnh with Best Director and Best Cinematography - Science film
- Director Đặng Lưu Việt Bảo and actress Xuân Văn with Best Director and Best Cinematography - Television film
- Director/animator Nguyễn Hà Bắc and actress Lý Kim Dung with Best Achievements in Animated film category (Film, Director, Animator)
- MC Hồng Phúc and MC Thùy Linh with Golden Kite for Best Film critic/theory research works
- Composer Phó Đức Phương and singer Ái Phương with Best Original Score and Best Sound - Feature film
- Bamboo Airways representative Bùi Quang Dũng (sponsor) and actress Dương Cẩm Lynh with Best Supporting Actress/Actor - Feature film
- Director Nguyễn Thanh Vân and actress Hồng Ánh with Best Leading Actress/Actor - Feature film
- Cinematographer Nguyễn K'Linh and actress Trương Ngọc Ánh with Best Cinematography and Best Art Design - Feature film
- Director Đào Bá Sơn and actress Minh Châu with Best Director - Feature film
- Screenwriter Nguyễn Thị Hồng Ngát and cinematographer Trần Quốc Dũng with Best Screenplay - Television film and Feature film
- VNPT - Vinaphone representative Trần Minh Dũng (companion brand) and journalist Đinh Trọng Tuấn with Golden Kite for Best Drama
- Deputy Minister of Culture, Sports and Tourism Lê Quang Tùng and actress Trà Giang with Golden Kite for Best Feature film

=== Performers ===
The following individuals performed at the ceremony:

- Singer Ái Phương with the song Nếu anh yêu em
- Giao Thời group with the song Ngày mới
- Singer Viết Nguyễn with the song Trạng Quỳnh

=== In Memoriam ===
At the beginning of the awards ceremony, the organizers took time to honor two People's Artists as follows on the occasion of 66 years of Vietnamese Revolutionary Cinema:

- Cinematographer Nguyễn Thế Đoàn
- Cinematographer Phạm Khắc

== Controversy ==
=== My Mr. Wife's surprise victory over Song Lang ===
If for comparison, the script "My Mr. Wife" is still based on a foreign background, giving the film a Golden Kite is a bit "generous". Meanwhile, "Song Lang" with the original script written by a Vietnamese author, which is a rare film that harmonizes both entertainment and art elements, was only ranked silver. Many judges felt sorry for Song Lang, who suggested that if the silver prize was awarded, no other film would be awarded the same level, to show respect for the young director's professional efforts.

=== Pressure on the Jury of TV category ===
According to Tuổi Trẻ's source, "Quỳnh the Doll" is better than "Across the River" by less than a point, will automatically win the Golden Kite. But after that, the jury were constantly under pressure to re-mark. The ones making pressure even used the reason that "Quỳnh the Doll" had a sensitive topic, so it should be given just the Silver Kite, and let "Across the River" won the Golden Kite.

However, the jury still holds the view that once a drama is allowed to air, then it is legal. In the morning meeting on April 12, 100% of the jury members for the TV category decided to defend their opinions, disagreeing to downgrade this drama to Silver Kite.

== See also ==
- 5th Hanoi International Film Festival
- 38th National Television Festival
- 2018 VTV Awards
