= 2019 Kite Awards =

Vietnamese cinema awards event

2019 Kite Awards (27th VCA Awards)
- Date: May 12 & 16, 2020
- Site: Hoàn Kiếm District, Hanoi; District 3, Ho Chi Minh City
- Hosted by: Thanh Tùng, Thùy Linh (Hanoi); Quý Bình (Ho Chi Minh City)
- Organised by: Vietnam Cinema Association

Highlights
- Most wins: Film: The Happiness of a Mother (6); Television: Come Home, My Dear (2)
- Golden Kite: Film: The Happiness of a Mother; Television: Come Home, My Dear
- Silver Kite: Film: Furie; Wartime Flowers; Television: Roses on the Left Chest

Television/radio coverage
- Network: not broadcast

The 2019 Kite Awards (Vietnamese: Giải Cánh diều 2019) is the 27th edition of Vietnam Cinema Association Awards, also the 18th edition since the award is officially named Kite. It honored the best in Vietnam film, television works of 2019. Affected by the COVID-19 pandemic, the award ceremony, which was originally planned to be held on March 15, 2020, then delayed to April 15, ended up being split into 2 small ceremonies at Hanoi on May 12 and Ho Chi Minh City on May 16.

This year, a total of 113 works participated in the award, including: 16 feature films, 13 TV drama series, 34 documentaries, 12 science films, 15 animated films, 17 short films and six film studies. The organizers do not announce the shortlist of nominees, but consider the prizes on all the above works and decide the winners.

The Happiness of a Mother won the most awards with six, including Golden Kite Award for Best Feature Film. In television, not unexpectedly, the hit show of the year Come Home, My Dear won the Golden Kite Award for Best Drama, also were the most awarded with two along with a promising acting award.

== Winner and nominees ==
Winners are listed first, highlighted in boldface.

Highlighted title indicates Golden Kite for the Best Film/Drama/Study winner(s).
Highlighted title indicates Silver Kite for the Second Best Film/Drama/Study winner(s).
Highlighted title indicates Film/Drama/Study(s) received the Certificate of Merit.
Other nominees

=== Feature film ===
**Best Film**
**The Happiness of a Mother**; **Furie**; **Wartime Flowers**; **Dear Devil Brother**; **The Royal Bride**; Dreamy Eyes; Home Sweet Home; Superstar Teacher; Mo' Money, Mo' Problems; Autumn Promise; Sunshine 3: The Father's Promise; The Eyes; 13rd Sister; Hợp đồng bán mình; Giã từ cô đơn; Lính chiến
**Best Director**	Best Screenplay
**Huỳnh Đông – The Happiness of a Mother**	The Happiness of a Mother – Nguyễn Thị Ngọc Bích, Lương Kim Liên
**Best Leading Actor**	Best Leading Actress
**Kiều Minh Tuấn – Sunshine 3: The Father's Promise as Dr. Tùng Sơn, Dear Devil Brother as Phong**	Cát Phượng – The Happiness of a Mother as Tuệ the Mother
**Best Supporting Actor**	Best Supporting Actress
**Isaac – Dear Devil Brother as Lâm**	Hồng Vân – The Royal Bride as the Grandma
**Best Cinematopraphy**	Best Art Design
**Võ Thanh Tiền – The Happiness of a Mother**	Nguyễn Minh Đương – Furie
**Best Original Score**	Best Sound Design
**Trần Mạnh Hùng – Wartime Flowers**	Vũ Thành Long – The Happiness of a Mother, Dreamy Eyes
**Promising Actor**	Promising Actress
**Phan Huy Khang – The Happiness of a Mother as Tim**	Nguyễn Ngọc Ngân Chi – Sunshine 3: The Father's Promise as Hồng Ân

==== Multiple wins ====
The following films received multiple wins:

Wins	Films
6	The Happiness of a Mother
2	Dear Devil Brother

=== Television film ===
**Best Drama**
**Come Home, My Dear** **(VTV)**; **Roses on the Left Chest** **(VTV)**; **Run Away From Youth** **(VTV)**; **Calendula Season** **(HTV)**; **The Lucky Five** **(HTV)**; The Domino Curse (SCTV); Husband for Sale (VTV); Romantic Wife (VTV); Girls in the City (VTV); Criminal Police: The Labyrinth (VTV); Lightning in the Rain (THVL); Motherhood (THVL); Lũy thép biên cương (QPVN)
**Best Director**	Best Screenplay
**Nguyễn Danh Dũng – Come Home, My Dear**	The Domino Curse – Khánh Bùi, Nhâm Minh Hiền
**Best Leading Actor**	Best Leading Actress
**Ngọc Quỳnh – Roses on the Left Chest as Thái**	Hồng Diễm – Roses on the Left Chest as Khuê
**Best Supporting Actor**	Best Supporting Actress
**Doãn Quốc Đam – Criminal Police: The Labyrinth as Fedora & "Fotomat" Long Nhật**	Cao Thái Hà – Husband for Sale as Diệu Ngọc
**Best Cinematopraphy**	Promising Actress
**Dương Tuấn Anh, Nguyễn Mạnh Hùng – Criminal Police: The Labyrinth**	Bảo Hân – Come Home, My Dear as Ánh Dương

==== Multiple wins ====
The following films received multiple wins:

Wins	Films
2	Come Home, My Dear
2	Roses on the Left Chest
2	Criminal Police: The Labyrinth

=== Animated film ===
**Best Film**
**The Wooden Bird**; **Sơn Tinh – Thủy Tinh**; **Broken Being: Prequel**; **The Naughty-Nice Business (Episode: The Long Nose)**; **The Tale of Nuggets Craft Village**; **Legend of Núi Cốc Lake**
**Best Director**	**Best Animator**
**Trần Khánh Duyên – The Wooden Bird**	**Hà Huy Hoàng, Đoàn Anh Kiệt – Broken Being: Prequel**

==== Multiple wins ====
The following films received multiple wins:

Wins	Films
2	The Wooden Bird

=== Documentary film ===
**Best Film**
**Chư Tan Kra**; **Hành trình một thương hiệu**; **Giáo sư, Tiến sỹ khoa học Hoàng Thủy Nguyên - Nhà virus học và chế tạo vacxin hàng đầu Việt Nam**; **Hành trình về phía bình minh**; **Tôi ghét tôi**; **Đất gọi**
**Best Director**	**Best Cinematography**
not awarded	**Trần Xuân Chung – Hành trình thư pháp Việt**

=== Science film ===
**Best Film**
- **Cuộc chiến chống SARS**
- **Lò đốt rác thải sinh hoạt**
- **Một giải pháp mềm**
- **Ghép tạng**
- **Ma túy không dược chất**
- **Năng lượng mặt trời**

=== Short film ===
**Best Film**
- **Mộng tưởng đen**
- **Hết hồn**
- **Cô ấy là Thanh**
- **Bí mật của mặt nạ**
- **Bà ơi**

=== Film critic/theory research ===
**Best Work**
- **Thiết kế mỹ thuật phim truyện điện ảnh** **(Theory-based and practice-based curriculum) – Doctor Trần Quang Minh**
- **Những dấu vết trên mặt đất** **(Essay book) – Doctor Vũ Ngọc Thanh**
- **Đạo diễn phim truyện Việt Nam - Part II** **(Film critic/theory research work) – Vietnam Film Institute**
- **Điện ảnh Việt Nam với đề tài chiến tranh, cách mạng** **(Film critic/theory research work) – Doctor Lê Thị Bích Hồng**

== Controversy ==
=== Wrongly announced the Promising Actress ===
A mistake of the organizers caused the announcement of the "Promising Actor in a Feature Film" award to be confused. The award originally belonged to child actress Ngân Chi, but before that, according to the press release, the award belonged to actress Oanh Kiều.

=== The winning of The Happiness of a Mother ===
"The Happiness of a Mother" has never been considered a strong or brightest candidate among the 16 films competing for the award. The film was even boycotted by the audience before it was released because it was related to the controversy of the main cast. Therefore, the fact that the film won the top prize and won 6 other individual awards raises many doubts.

Director Huỳnh Đông was also surprised because he did not think his film would win so many awards, especially the Golden Kite Award for Feature Film. However, he denied "spending money to buy prizes" as rumors behind his back.

== See also ==
- 21st Vietnam Film Festival – 2019 film festival in Vietnam
- 39th National Television Festival
- 2019 VTV Awards – Vietnamese Awards held in 2019
