= 39th National Television Festival =

- Location: Nha Trang, Vietnam
- Founded: 1981
- Awards: Grand Prize - Serial Drama: Come Home, My Dear; Gold Prize - Serial Drama: Thirst Island
- Hosted by: Danh Tùng, Thùy Linh
- Festival date: December 11–14, 2019
- Website: Official Website

National Television Festival chronology
- 40th 38th

The 39th National Television Festival (Vietnamese: Liên hoan truyền hình toàn quốc lần thứ 39) was held from December 11 to December 14, 2019, in Nha Trang City, Khánh Hòa Province. It reviewed and honoured best works of Vietnam's television industry in 2019.

== Event ==
=== Participation ===
More than 1,200 delegates from Radio - Television stations and television channels throughout the country attended the Festival. There are 464 works by authors and groups of authors. In which, the reportage genre attracted the most participating works with nearly 150 works. The documentary category has more than 80 single-episode documentaries and six multi-episodes documentaries submitted for competition. In general, the number of entries was less than in the previous year, but the quality increased markedly in many genres.

=== Activities ===
The 39th National Television Festival is organized by Vietnam Television in collaboration with Khanh Hoa Radio and Television Station (KTV). This is the 4th time KTV has hosted the Festival, the biggest event of the year for Vietnamese broadcasters. Many activities took place at the festival:

- The opening ceremony took place at 20:10 on December 11, at the Convention Center of Khanh Hoa province, broadcast live on channel VTV1
- Workshop: Producing news on the Internet environment (Vietnamese: "Sản xuất tin tức trên môi trường Internet"), with the participation of foreign speakers
- Workshop: Investigative reportage on television (Vietnamese: "Phóng sự điều tra trên truyền hình")
- Photo exhibition: Broadcasters (Vietnamese: Những người làm truyền hình"). It's about the activities of the national television industry
- The closing and awarding ceremony took place at 8 pm on December 14, broadcast live on KTV and replayed at 3 pm on December 15 on VTV1

== Awards ==
After 4 working days, 9 judges in 9 categories awarded a total of: 1 Grand Prize, 30 Gold Prizes, 54 Silver Prizes, 126 Certificates of Merit. For the first time since 2016, a Grand Prize, which is higher than the Gold Prize, was awarded by the Festival. It was given to the drama Come Home, My Dear produced by VTV Film Center (VFC), thanks to its great effects and influence on the national audience during the year.

In addition, the jury awarded 3 individual awards in the Drama category and 1 other individual award in the Television Theater category.

The list below doesn't include the works received Certificate of Merit:

Highlighted title indicates Grand Prize
The double-dagger (‡) indicates Short Drama or Multi-episodes Documentary
Serial Drama and Single-episode Documentary are shown without any dagger icon

=== Grand & Gold Prize ===
Drama	Best Screenplay – Drama
Come Home, My Dear (VTV); Thirst Island (HTV)	Come Home, My Dear – Nguyễn Thu Thủy, Trịnh Khánh Hà, Đỗ Thủy Tiên, Nguyễn Thị Thu Trang
Best Actor – Drama	Best Actress – Drama
Cao Minh Đạt – Lightning in the Rain as Mr. Ba	Thu Quỳnh – Come Home, My Dear as Huệ
Television Theater	Best Actor – Television Theater
Tổ quốc nơi cuối con đường (VTV)	Lê Hoàng Long – Tổ quốc nơi cuối con đường as Tống Văn Sơ
Dialogue or Talk Program	Singing, Choreography, Music Program
Cất cánh: Thầy, trò và cuộc sống 4.0 (VTV); Dấu ấn Việt Nam trong hoạt động đối ngoại đa phương (QPVN); Lời Người dặn lại nước non (VTV); Phía sau một ca hiến ghép tạng (HTV)	Hòa ca (VTV); Musical Film: Giữ mãi một niềm tin (VTV)
Documentary	Reportage
Gói những truân chuyên (VTV); Ngôi sao vô danh (VTV); Rồi con sẽ về (QPVN); Việt Nam - Đất nước tôi (HTV); Những đứa trẻ hạnh phúc (VTV) ‡	Buôn lậu rác thuốc vào Việt Nam: Đông dược hay độc dược? (VTV); Đẻ thuê (VTV); Góc tối (KTV); Mong Bình An (VTV); Thủ phủ chăn nuôi trong cơn "đại hồng thủy" (ĐNRTV); Tử tế với Sa Cần (PTQ); Về lại đại ngàn (THLC)
Thematic or Science/Education Program	Children's Program
Amiang trắng và sự lựa chọn (VTV); Đà Nẵng - Tìm lại chính mình (DanangTV); Kè mềm sinh thái (QRT); Người lặng thầm lan tỏa văn hóa Việt (NTV Nghệ An)	Chị Hai (PTQ); Không muốn về nhà (VTV)
Program in Ethnic Minority Language
Âm nhạc Chăm (NTV Ninh Thuận); Chuyện ở Plei Rbai (THGL); Rời núi (QRT); Vùng đất của những tỷ phú (KTV)

=== Silver Prize ===
Drama	Television Theater
Lightning in the Rain (THVL); Stormy River (ATV); Predestined (Thang Long AV) ‡	Cơn mê cuối cùng (HTV); Nhà Lánh (HTV)
Dialogue or Talk Program	Singing, Choreography, Music Program
Bác sĩ Việt kiều về quê hương tìm lẽ sống (VTV); Điều ước của cô đỡ thôn bản (VTV); Hệ lụy từ dự án thủy điện Đăk Đrinh (VTV Center in Đà Nẵng)	7 lần chạm (HTV); Bay lên nhé nụ cười (VTV Center in Ho Chi Minh City); Hương rừng (VTV); Musical Film: Giấc mơ có thật (TTV Thanh Hóa); Musical Film: Tìm về câu hát dân ca (THHN)
Documentary	Reportage
"Cột mốc sống" giữ biên cương (CRTV); Chuyện ba người đàn bà câm (TN); Cuốn nhật ký định mệnh (QPVN); Dòng sông lặng lẽ (KTV); Giáo sư - Tiến sĩ Đặng Lương Mô (Ryo Dang) (HTV); Lý do tôi sinh ra (VTV); Một đóng góp cho nền y học thế giới (VTVCab); Những bức thư của mẹ (NTV Nghệ An); Phù sa lưng trời (THVL); Startup - Khởi nghiệp, Đổi mới, Sáng tạo (HTV) ‡	Bi hài đo đạc bản đồ địa chính (HTTV); Cho con làm người (VTV); Chống dịch hay nuôi dịch? (NTV Nghệ An); Chuyện của Tư (TBTV); Gửi lại yêu thương (NTV Ninh Bình); Làm đẹp những con số (TTV Thanh Hóa); Người giữ lửa ở Lũng Vải (TTV Tuyên Quang); Người xây ước mơ (VTV); Những cô gái phía sau chân núi (VTV); Những người không thích giàu (YTV); Sông cạn (HTV); Tâm (THĐT); Thánh "Rác" (DanangTV)
Thematic or Science/Education Program	Children's Program
Con đường để nông sản hội nhập (VTV Center in Ho Chi Minh City); Công dân tự nhiên (VTV); Cuộc chiến chống SARS (VTV); Hướng đi nào cho hồ tiêu ở Gia Lai? (THGL); Không chạy lũ (QBTV); Mưu sinh miền sông nước (VTV); Sông đau (VTV Center in Huế); Tái sinh rừng tự nhiên bằng quả cầu hạt giống (NTV Ninh Thuận)	Cậu bé biến rác thành tiền (KTV); Để Bon kể cho nghe (HTV); Về miền di sản (TTV Thanh Hóa)
Program in Ethnic Minority Language
Dấu ấn nhà nông hiện đại (STV Sóc Trăng); Gánh nợ đại tiệc sinh nhật (ANTV); Hồi sinh sau lũ (TTV); Mẹ Thuận (HBTV); Người Đảng viên thắp sáng núi rừng (LTV Lai Châu); Vẫn mãi một tình yêu (LTV Lâm Đồng); Xuân ca (VTV Center in Ho Chi Minh City)

== See also ==
- 2019 Kite Awards
- 2019 VTV Awards
- 21st Vietnam Film Festival
