= 40th National Television Festival =

- Location: ~~Ninh Bình~~ / Hanoi, Vietnam
- Founded: 1981
- Awards: Gold Prize - Serial Drama: Life and Death; Lonesome Murderer
- Hosted by: Sơn Lâm, Thụy Vân
- Festival date: December 13–16, 2020
- Website: Official Website

National Television Festival chronology
- 41st 39th

The 40th National Television Festival (Vietnamese: Liên hoan truyền hình toàn quốc lần thứ 40) was held from December 13 to December 16, 2020, in Hanoi. It reviewed and honoured best works of Vietnam's television industry in 2020.

== Event ==
=== Participation ===
This year's festival attracted 422 entries in 9 categories. In order to ensure measures to prevent and control the COVID-19 epidemic, the festival did not hold a gathering of delegates to attend activities in Ninh Binh as planned, but will be held in a limited way at the headquarters of Vietnam Television in Hanoi. The judges have conducted the examination and judging since December 13.

=== Activities ===
Due to the impact of the COVID-19 pandemic, most activities of the 40th National Television Festival had to be canceled. This festival this time only focuses on grading and ranking of television works in 9 categories.

In addition to the traditional official prizes, the Festival has two more prize categories:

- Prizes for programs on ethnic and mountainous topics, judging in 8 contest categories (excluding programs in ethnic minority language). This sub-award is awarded by the Committee for Ethnic Minorities in collaboration with Vietnam Television.
- The "Digital Content Interaction" Prize is for delegates and audience to vote for the contest entries (except for works in Drama category) on VTV.vn, VTV News applications, VTVgo. The voting round is from 12:00 on December 5, 2020, to 12:00 on December 15, 2020.

The Announcement and Awarding Ceremony took place at 20:05 on December 16, 2020, broadcast live on VTV1, livestream on digital platforms of Vietnam Television Station. The ceremony is limited to a very low number of participants. Only the Gold Prizes was awarded on stage. The Silver Prizes and Certificates of Merit are announced and sent to the winning units.

== Awards ==
After nearly a week of judging, the 40th National Television Festival awarded 38 Gold prizes, 63 Silver prizes and 109 certificates of merit to works registered for the competition. Only 2 individual prizes were given to actor and actress in Drama category.

There are 14 works that won Best Program on Ethnic and Mountainous Topics. The Drama category has no works eligible for this award.

After compiling online voting results, the Digital Content Interaction Prize went to The boy with cancer and the classroom for poor children (Vietnamese: "Chàng trai bị ung thư và lớp học cho trẻ em nghèo") in the category of Children's Program. The work received 702 votes.

The list below doesn't include the works received Certificate of Merit:

The double-dagger (‡) indicates Multi-episodes Documentary
Serial Drama and Single-episode Documentary are shown without any dagger icon

=== Gold Prize ===
Drama
Life and Death (VTV); Lonesome Murderer (HTV)
Best Actor – Drama	Best Actress – Drama
Việt Anh – Life and Death as Mai Hồng Vũ	Ngọc Lan – Heaven's Law as Trang
Television Theater	Children's Program
Cải lương: Án tử (HTV); Sự khởi đầu mới (VTV)	Gọi yêu thương (THP); Thế giới diệu kỳ của chị Bool Bool (VTV)
Dialogue or Talk Program	Singing, Choreography, Music Program
Ký ức hòa bình (VTV); Tổ quốc ghi công (QPVN); Vì niềm tin, vì hạnh phúc (HTV)	Nơi ấy là mặt trời (HTV); Musical Film: Lời nói dối cuối cùng (QPVN); Musical Film: Nắng lên bên mẹ (VTV)
Thematic or Science/Education Program	Documentary
Cô Na phòng Covid (TTV11); Đối mặt với thiên tai (TTV Thanh Hóa); Ép ngọt thành mặn (NTV Nghệ An); Màu hi vọng (VTV); Miền Tây không lũ (VTV Center in Southern Region); Kỹ thuật nuôi hàu giống (NTV Ninh Bình)	Không hối tiếc (HTV); Món quà kỳ diệu (TRT); Những đứa con làng Chăm (VTV Center in Southern Region); Ta Đăng - Đăng Nưm (VTV); Những giải mã mang tên Việt Nam (VTV) ‡; Ra biển lớn (HTV)‡
Reportage
Cô giáo Mường toàn cầu (Nhân Dân TV); Hai nửa cuộc đời (HTV); Hộ "cận nghèo" là hộ ở cận... nhà nghèo (VTV); Mầm sạch (DanangTV); Muốn nghèo không dễ (CTV); Nhức nhối vấn nạn khai thác khoáng sản trái phép ở các tỉnh Tây Nguyên (ANTV); Nơi đâu là an toàn (QRT); Phá rừng quy mô lớn (VTV); Về đâu những cánh chim (NTV Ninh Bình)
Program in Ethnic Minority Language
Thematic	Cultural/Artistic
Nghĩa tình Ia Lâu (THGL); Nhận diện Pa-dâu (ANTV); Vẫn nóng chuyện tảo hôn ở đồng bào Mông (ĐTV)	Người Chăm gắn với văn hóa biển (NTV Ninh Thuận); Rộn ràng tiếng nhạc Pin Piet (STV Sóc Trăng)

=== Silver Prize ===
Drama
Heaven's Law (THVL); Baker King (THVL)
Television Theater	Children's Program
Người con của Vạn Thắng Vương (NTV Ninh Bình); Người soi gương (HTV); Vụ án Am Bụt Mọc (NTV Nghệ An)	Giấc mơ tí hon (TTV Thanh Hóa); Là La Lá (VTV); Lọc cà lọc cọc (HTV)
Dialogue or Talk Program	Singing, Choreography, Music Program
90 năm vì nước, vì dân (VTV); Ẩn họa hồ chứa (HTTV); Khai thác và bảo vệ di sản - Câu chuyện từ Tràng An (NTV Ninh Bình); Lắng nghe tiếng Đất, lời Sông (THP)	Men say đất nhãn (HY); Nguyễn Ánh 9 - Lặng lẽ tiếng dương cầm (VTV Center in Southern Region); Sáo vỗ - Lời tâm tình của đại ngàn (Nhân Dân TV)
Thematic or Science/Education Program	Documentary
Cảm ơn Việt Nam (VTVCab); Chuyển hóa rác chết (BTV Bình Dương); Đà Nẵng trên chặng đường đi tới (DanangTV); Độc đáo nhà ở của người Hà Nhì - Y Tý, Lào Cài (THLC); Giải pháp IMO, câu chuyện nông nghiệp tử tế (ĐNRTV); Hồi sinh giống gà trong truyền thuyết (VTC); Không khó đoán định tương lai (PTV); Lũ rút đi, kinh nghiệm ở lại! (QBTV); Tái sinh (QPVN); Thủy điện Đắk Mi 4 xả lũ và câu chuyện đền bù thiệt hại (VTV Center in Central Region)	Đài hoa bất tử (ANTV); Giấc mơ xa (NTV Ninh Bình); Hành trình theo dấu chân cha (VTVCab); Nhọc nhằn tình mẹ (VTV); Những người phá băng (Media 21); Những ô cửa hy vọng (VTV); Người đàn bà đi trên mặt hồ (THVL); Tái sinh (VTV); Việt Nam - Cuộc chiến 100 ngày (VTC); Vợ lính (NTV Ninh Bình); Người mẹ (VTV Center in Central Region) ‡; Sức hút đại ngàn (THLC) ‡
Reportage
App mua sắm hoàn tiền 80%: Khi "phù thủy" đội lốt "thần đèn" (VTV); Bại não - Trí không bại! (BTV Bắc Ninh); Con nuôi (VTV); Đất đó... Đường đâu? (HTTV); Điện mặt trời - Bài toán hiệu quả và hệ quả (DRT); Gỡ nút thắt năng lương (NTV Ninh Thuận); Hụi thì... lụi (ĐNRTV); "Khát" tại những công trình cấp nước tiền tỷ (VP); Người Dao xóm nhỏ làm việc lớn (CRTV); Ngược dòng nước lũ (NTV Nghệ An); Nỗi đau từ dự án bảo tồn gien quý hiếm (VTV Center in Southern Region); Ông Tèo "tín dụng" và hồi kết được báo trước (THGL); Sơ Nụ (TBTV); Thuê thầy khoán việc (TN); Vợ chồng cùng ra trận (PTQ); Vùng nuôi tôm hùm - Bao giờ nước mắt ngừng rơi? (PTP); Vượt sóng (QBTV)
Program in Ethnic Minority Language
Thematic	Cultural/Artistic
An cư sau lũ dữ (QRT); Đường xuống núi (NTV Nghệ An); Làm giàu ở bản thời hội nhập (QTV); Lời cảnh cáo từ đại ngàn (PTQ); Người Khmer một lòng theo Đảng (TTV11); Thắp sáng đại ngàn (TTV Thanh Hóa)	Mà phố sa Then (TN); Sợi chỉ đỏ (THLC); Trên mảnh đất tình người (VTV Center in Southern Region)

=== Additional Prize ===
==== Best Program on Ethnic and Mountainous Topics ====
Television Theater	Children's Program
Bài chòi: Bình minh trên đỉnh Pa-rút (BTV Bình Định)	Cầu vồng sau mưa (NTV Ninh Bình)
Dialogue or Talk Program	Singing, Choreography, Music Program
Thăng trầm cây cao su vùng biên giới Lai Châu (LTV Lai Châu)	Hương Chàm (VTV)
Thematic or Science/Education Program	Documentary
Chuyện làng Lơ Bơ (VTV); Độc đáo nhà ở của người Hà Nhì - Y Tý, Lào Cai (THLC)	Giữ lửa Krăng Go (LTV Lâm Đồng); Những đứa con làng Chăm (VTV Center in Southern Region); Người đi tìm mật (Tây Việt Media)
Reportage
Cô giáo Mường toàn cầu (Nhân Dân TV); Cưới nợ (THGL); Đóa hoa Chan Nên ở phum Kà Ốt (TTV11); Người Dao xóm nhỏ làm việc lớn (CRTV); Thầy Vàng Anh (VTV)

==== Digital Content Interaction Prize ====
- Chàng trai bị ung thư và lớp học cho trẻ em nghèo (DRT) – Children's Program

== See also ==
- 2020 Kite Awards
- 2020 VTV Awards
