= Ky Nam Inn =

2025 film by Leon Le

- Festival release poster
- Vietnamese: Quán Kỳ Nam
- Directed by: Leon Le
- Written by: Leon Le; Nguyen Thi Minh Ngoc
- Produced by: Leon Le; Thanh Luan Vu
- Starring: Đỗ Thị Hải Yến; Liên Bỉnh Phát
- Cinematography: Bob Nguyen
- Edited by: Leon Le
- Music by: Ton That An
- Production companies: UFO Entertainment; HAY FILMS
- Release date: 7 September 2025 (Toronto)
- Running time: 140 minutes
- Country: Vietnam
- Language: Vietnamese

Ky Nam Inn (Vietnamese: Quán Kỳ Nam) is a 2025 Vietnamese romantic drama film directed, written, produced, and edited by Leon Le. It stars Đỗ Thị Hải Yến and Liên Bỉnh Phát.

It had its world premiere at the 2025 Toronto International Film Festival on 7 September. It was released in Vietnamese theatres on 28 November 2025.

== Premise ==
Set in post-war Saigon, a young translator working on a new translation of Antoine de Saint-Exupéry's The Little Prince, falls in love with a widow.

== Production ==
In an interview with Vilcek Foundation, Le revealed that he became inspired to write Ky Nam Inn while working on his feature directorial debut film Song Lang, also the Ky Nam character was inspired by his neighbor while he was working on the film.

== Release ==
Ky Nam Inn had its world premiere at the 2025 Toronto International Film Festival on 7 September at the Special Presentations section. It had its Asian premiere at the 30th Busan International Film Festival at the Window on Asian Cinema section on 19 September 2025. It was presented in Open Zone section of the 2025 Stockholm International Film Festival on 7 November 2025.

It was released in Vietnamese theatres on 28 November 2025.

The film was showcased in the Country In Focus: Vietnam section of the 25th New York Asian Film Festival on 18 July 2026 and had its New York Premiere.

== Accolades ==
Award / Film Festival	Date of ceremony	Category	Recipient(s)	Result	Ref.
Hawaiʻi International Film Festival	24 October 2025	Kau Ka Hōkū Award	Leon Le	Won	
Golden Horse Awards	22 November 2025	NETPAC Award	Leon Le	Nominated	
