= 2020 Kite Awards =

Vietnamese cinema awards event

2020 Kite Awards (28th VCA Awards)
- Date: December 22, 2021
- Site: Dolce by Wyndham Hanoi Golden Lake, Ba Đình District, Hanoi
- Hosted by: Minh Trang
- Organised by: Vietnam Cinema Association

Highlights
- Most wins: Film: Dad, I'm Sorry (3); Camellia Sisters (3); Television: Criminal Police: The Crocodile File (4)
- Golden Kite: Film: Dad, I'm Sorry; Television: Criminal Police: The Crocodile File
- Silver Kite: Film: Camellia Sisters; Diary of Child Master’s Adventure; Television: Extraordinary Sunflowers; Love and Ambition; Sky-high Love

Television/radio coverage
- Network: not broadcast

The 2020 Kite Awards (Vietnamese: Giải Cánh diều 2020) is the 28th edition of Vietnam Cinema Association Awards, also the 19th edition since the award is officially named Kite. It honored the best in Vietnam film, television works of 2020.

Due to the spread of the COVID-19 epidemic with many complicated developments, the organizers decided not to organize side activities and postpone the announcement ceremony to the end of the year instead of March as usual. On December 22, 2021, the announcement and award ceremony was held in a compact manner with a limited number of guests in Hanoi.

This year, a total of 141 works participated in the award, including: 12 feature films, 16 TV drama series, 60 documentaries, 12 science films, 20 animated films, 18 short films and 3 film studies.

In feature film category, Dad, I'm Sorry and Camellia Sisters both won 3 with the former was awarded Golden Kite. Drama The Crocodile File from the series Criminal Police unexpectedly won big with 4 awards included Golden Kite.

== Winner and nominees ==
Winners are listed first, highlighted in boldface.

- Highlighted title indicates Golden Kite for the Best Film/Drama/Study winner(s).
- Highlighted title indicates Silver Kite for the Second Best Film/Drama/Study winner(s).
- Highlighted title indicates Film/Drama/Study(s) received the Certificate of Merit.
  - Other nominees

=== Feature film ===
**Best Film**
**Dad, I'm Sorry**; **Camellia Sisters**; **Diary of Child Master's Adventure**; **Great War of Pupils**; **The Instrument of Murder**; **Sunshine All the Way**; Kiều; What We Forgot to Remember; Blood Moon Party; 13th Sister: Three Deadly Days; Invisible Evidence; Sai Gon in the Rain
**Best Director**	**Best Screenplay**
**Bảo Nhân, Nam Cito – Camellia Sisters**	**The Instrument of Murder – Tạ Nguyên Hiệp, Nguyễn Quang Huy, Bành Quang Minh Nhật**
**Best Leading Actor**	**Best Leading Actress**
**Tuấn Trần – Dad, I'm Sorry as Quắn**; B Trần – The Instrument of Murder as Lâm	**Kaity Nguyễn – Camellia Sisters as Lý Linh**; Lê Khanh – Camellia Sisters as Lý Lệ Hà
**Best Supporting Actor**	**Best Supporting Actress**
**Lê Khả Sinh – Sunshine All the Way as Platoon Leader Nguyễn Huy Hùng**	**Karen Nguyễn – What We Forgot to Remember as Vân**
**Best Cinematopraphy**	**Best Art Design**
**Diệp Thế Vinh – Dad, I'm Sorry**	**Phạm Hùng – Camellia Sisters**
**Best Original Score**	**Best Sound Design**
**Bùi Huy Tuấn, Lê Thanh Tâm – Kiều**	**The Crew from Wall Sound – Diary of Child Master’s Adventure**

==== Multiple wins ====
The following films received multiple wins:

Wins	Films
3	Dad, I'm Sorry
3	Camellia Sisters

=== Television film ===
**Best Drama**
**Criminal Police: The Crocodile File** **(VTV)**; **Extraordinary Sunflowers** **(VTV)**; **Love and Ambition** **(VTV)**; **Sky-high Love** **(VTV)**; **A Girl Somewhere** **(VTV)**; **Red Sand** **(VTV)**; **Balanha Homestay** **(VTV)**; **Lonesome Murderer** **(HTV)**; Life and Death (VTV); Cozy Fire (VTV); Bound By Love (VTV); Don't Force Me to Forget (VTV); Life Choice (VTV); Retire Into Love (VTV); Hai Duong in the Wind (HTV); Heaven's Law (THVL)
**Best Director**	**Best Screenplay**
**Nguyễn Mai Hiền – Criminal Police: The Crocodile File**	**Criminal Police: The Crocodile File – Tạ Hồng Minh, Nguyễn Trung Dũng, Lê Thu Thuỷ**
**Best Leading Actor**	**Best Leading Actress**
**Mạnh Trường – Criminal Police: The Crocodile File as Hải**	**Lương Thu Trang – Extraordinary Sunflowers as Cao Dương Minh**; Diễm My – Love and Ambition as Phan Hoàng Linh; Thúy Ngân – Hai Duong in the Wind as Hải Đường
**Best Supporting Actor**	**Best Supporting Actress**
**Thanh Sơn – Love and Ambition as Sơn**; Hữu Châu – Bound By Love as Mr. Phong; Thạch Ngọc Khánh – Red Sand as Tư	**Trinh Tuyết Hương – Red Sand as Đủ**; Lan Phương – Bound By Love as Dung; Hương Giang – A Girl Somewhere as Mận
**Best Cinematography**
**Trần Kim Vũ – Red Sand**

==== Multiple wins ====
The following films received multiple wins:

Wins	Films
4	Criminal Police: The Crocodile File
2	Red Sand

=== Animated film ===
**Best Film**
**Legend of Holy Sword**; **The Greatest Teacher of All Time**; **Marvelous Life**; **Rotten Log**; **Bird of Paradise Flower's Tale**
**Best Director**	**Best Animator**
**Phạm Hồng Sơn – Marvelous Life**	**Vũ Duy Khánh – The Greatest Teacher of All Time**

=== Documentary film ===
**Best Film**
**Phạm Ngọc Thạch người thầy thuốc trọng nghĩa thương dân**; **Chuyện tuổi già**; **Cám ơn Việt Nam**; **Danh họa Diệp Minh Châu**; **Người mẹ**; **Ngày về**; **Glorious Pain**; **365 Ngày**
**Best Director**	**Best Cinematography**
**Nguyễn Hồng Việt – Cám ơn Việt Nam**; **Phùng Ngọc Tú – Chuyện tuổi già**	**Tạ Đức Nguyên – Những ngả đường sáng tối**

=== Science film ===
**Best Film**
**Tắc mạch xạ trị**; **Tôi đi tìm ngọt**; **Phải sống**; **Asen - Sát thủ vô hình**; **Thiên nhiên và con người**
**Best Director**	**Best Cinematography**
**Huỳnh Bá Phúc – Tôi đi tìm ngọt**	**Nguyễn Tài Việt, Chu Văn Vui, Dương Văn Thuân – Phải sống**

=== Short film ===
**Best Film**
- **Một cõi đi về**
- **Đường cao tốc**
- **Cơm rác**
- **Ba lô**
- **Có lẽ tôi là người giàu nhất**

=== Film critic/theory research ===
**Best Work**
- **Truyền hình Việt Nam: Quá khứ và hiện tại** **(Book) – Nguyễn Lê Văn, Đỗ Ngọc Việt Dũng**
- **Thể loại phim truyện điện ảnh** **(Specialized Curriculum) – Doctor Vũ Ngọc Thanh**

== See also ==
- 40th National Television Festival
- 2020 VTV Awards
