= 38th National Television Festival =

- Location: Đà Lạt, Vietnam
- Founded: 1981
- Awards: Gold Prize - Serial Drama: Sticky Rice and Plain Rice; Those Days We Fell in Love
- Hosted by: Mỹ Vân, Danh Tùng, Thùy Linh
- Festival date: December 19–22, 2018
- Website: Official Website

National Television Festival chronology
- 39th 37th

The 38th National Television Festival (Vietnamese: Liên hoan truyền hình toàn quốc lần thứ 38) was held from December 19 to December 22, 2018, in Đà Lạt City, Lâm Đồng Province. It reviewed and honoured the best works of Vietnam's television industry in 2018.

== Event ==
=== Participation ===
More than 1000 delegates from 114 television units attended the 38th National Television Festival. In which, 106 units participated in the competition. A total of 497 television works were submitted. The Reportage category continued to attract the most participating works (148 works). This is also a category with fierce competition among contestants with a wide variety of topics, reflecting the current picture of many localities as well as hot issues across the country in the past year.

A notable new feature is that from this festival, dramas with scripts adapted or adapted from foreign literary works will be allowed to participate in the competition. This is also the first year that the documentary genre has expanded to include multi-episodes documentaries.

=== Activities ===
The Festival is organized by Vietnam Television in collaboration with Lâm Đồng Radio and Television Station (LTV). This is the first time LTV Lâm Đồng has hosted this event. Many activities took place within the framework of the festival:

- The opening ceremony took place at 20:00 on December 19 at the Labor Culture House of Lâm Đồng province, broadcast live on VTV1 channel.
- Judging and grading the works in contest in Dalat Du Parc Hotel since December 17
- Free screenings from December 19 to 22 at 8 large rooms of Dalat Palace Hotel
- Photo Exhibition: Broadcasters (Vietnamese: "Những người làm truyền hình) opened at 08:30 on December 20 at the flower garden of Dalat Palace Hotel
- Seminars at Dalat Palace Hotel in the morning and afternoon of December 20, respectively:
  - Social Network and Television (Vietnamese: "Mạng xã hội và truyền hình")
  - Solutions for using portable and compact equipment for program production (Vietnamese: "Giải pháp sử dụng thiết bị cơ động, nhỏ gọn cho sản xuất chương trình")
- The closing and awarding ceremony took place at 20:00 on December 22 at the Labor Culture House of Lâm Đồng province, broadcast live on LTV Lâm Đồng channel, simultaneously reporting online on the information page of the festival and the VTV News electronic newspaper. It is replayed at 14:15 on Sunday (December 23) on channel VTV1.

== Awards ==
At the closing ceremony of the 38th National Television Festival, the organizers awarded 30 Gold prizes, 56 Silver prizes, and 128 Certificates of merit to works in 9 categories. In addition, there are 3 individual awards given to actor, actress and D.O.P in the Drama category.

The list below doesn't include the works received Certificate of Merit:

The double-dagger (‡) indicates Short Drama or Multi-episodes Documentary
The dagger (†) indicates Single-episode Drama
Serial Drama and Single-episode Documentary are shown without any dagger icon

=== Gold Prize ===
Drama	Best Director of Photography – Drama
Sticky Rice and Plain Rice (HTV); Those Days We Fell in Love (VTV)	Dương Tuấn Anh – Those Days We Fell in Love
Best Actor – Drama	Best Actress – Drama
Nhan Phúc Vinh – Those Days We Fell in Love as Tùng	Lê Phương – Sticky Rice and Plain Rice as Hương
Television Theater	Children's Program
Chúng em ký tên dưới đây (HTV)	Lớn lên em muốn làm gì?: Nghề lính cứu hỏa (VTV); Vị quê nhà (THP)
Dialogue or Talk Program	Singing, Choreography, Music Program
30 năm sứ mệnh FDI (VTV); Bản hùng ca mùa xuân - Chân trần chí thép (HTV)	Bản sắc phương Nam (HTV); Musical Film: Bình minh cuối con đường (VTV)
Documentary	Reportage
Nửa thế kỷ thầm lặng (PTV); Người vẽ ước mơ (BRT); Những thanh niên làng Nam Ô (VTV Center in Đà Nẵng); Trở về từ Paris (HTV); Lần theo dấu vết (VTV) ‡	Đường của Thầy (YTV); Lựa chọn nghiệt ngã (VTV); Người mai mối "cuộc tình": Nông dân - Siêu thị (PTQ); Người Thầy (HTV); Phức tạp hoạt động bảo kê tại chợ Long Biên (VTV); Sáp nhập xã, xóm, bản - Khó từ đề án (NTV Nghệ An); Tour du lịch 0 đồng (VTV); Vị ngọt cho đời (LTV Lâm Đồng)
Thematic or Science/Education Program	Program in Ethnic Minority Language
Căn bệnh bị lãng quên (HTV); "Chuyển vị" rùa biển (QRT); Nơi khởi phát nền quân chủ (VTV); Trăm dâu đổ đầu tằm (NTV Nghệ An)	Chuyện người nghèo xin thoát nghèo ở Quảng Ninh (QTV); Người Mông Yên Bái làm du lịch (YTV); Nhớ mãi ơn Người (VTV Center in Ho Chi Minh City); Tình ca đại ngàn (DanangTV)

=== Silver Prize ===
Drama	Television Theater
Across the River (HTV); Surname Lý Given Name Thông (Thang Long AV) †	Điều tốt đẹp còn lại (VTV); Lệ làng phép nước (DanangTV)
Dialogue or Talk Program	Singing, Choreography, Music Program
Đường chúng ta đi (VTV); Hành trình truyền cảm hứng (VTV); Mãi mãi xứng danh bộ đội cụ Hồ (QPVN); Thay lời tri ân năm 2018 - Cống hiến (VTV)	Đến với cao nguyên (DRT); Tôi 1 ngày + 1 (VTV Center in Ho Chi Minh City); Musical Film: Vọng nguyệt (VTV); Musical Film: Vũ khúc ánh trăng (QPVN)
Thematic or Science/Education Program	Documentary
Âm thanh đầu tiên (VTV); Canh tác nông nghiệp sa mạc (VTV Center in Ho Chi Minh City); Công nghệ cao không chỉ là nhà kính (LTV Lâm Đồng); Đổi đời cho rác (BTV Bình Dương); Hạnh phúc mỗi ngày được sống (VTV Center in Huế); Ở nơi ân nghĩa mênh mông (LTV Lai Châu); Thầy cô phải đẹp (PTQ); Thoát hiểm khi có cháy ở chung cư, nhà cao tầng (DanangTV)	Đôi mắt của rừng (LTV Lâm Đồng); Hai nửa cuộc đời (THP); Hành trình hóa giải (QPVN); Hành trình nối từ ký ức (VTV); Hậu phương nơi tiền tuyến (NTV Nghệ An); Hoàn lương (VTV); Hơn cả cuộc tìm kiếm (VTV); Mệ A (QBTV); Tôi còn sống (QPVN); Trở về (VTV); Ký sự biển đảo quê hương (HTV) ‡
Reportage
Bà Sáu bơi lội (VTV Center in Cần Thơ); Bỗng dưng thoát nghèo (HGTV Hà Giang); Cô giáo xương thủy tinh (VTV); Cơn bão tín dụng đen (BGTV); Đầu tư chỉ để đạt chuẩn (TBK); "Ép khuôn" (QBTV); Hồi sinh Khe Chữ (QRT); Nghĩa trang trên đầu - Nghĩa trang dưới nước (PTP); Nhìn lên để... vươn cao (TRT); Những chiêu trò khiến đường trong nước khốn đón (ANTV); Những ngôi mộ từ trên trời rơi xuống (VP); Phía sau bục giảng (DRT); Quản lý đất đai xây dựng: Bó tay! hay tiếp tay (ĐNRTV); Rác thế giới đổ bộ vào Việt Nam (Tuổi Trẻ News); Thầy Cương (VTV)
Children's Program	Program in Ethnic Minority Language
Bài ca màu xanh (KTV); Chúng ta là một gia đình (VTV); Dây nơ xanh (HTV); Mỗi ngày là một điều vui (HTV)	Bước ra từ buôn làng (DRT); Làng nông thôn mới (THGL); Người truyền câu hát Sli (BGTV); Phận đời chiếu lác (STV Sóc Trăng); Thủ lĩnh bản Na Lợt (NTV Nghệ An); Tìm lại tấm da trâu đã mất (LTV Lâm Đồng)

== See also ==
- 2018 Kite Awards
- 2018 VTV Awards
