= 21st Vietnam Film Festival =

2019 film festival in Vietnam

Liên hoan phim Việt Nam lần thứ 21 (21st Vietnam Film Festival)
- Opening film: Hạnh phúc của mẹ
- Location: Vũng Tàu, Vietnam
- Founded: 1970
- Awards: Golden Lotus: Song Lang (Feature); Chông chênh (Documentary); Người anh hùng áo vải (Animated)
- Hosted by: Đại Dương, Thanh Thanh Huyền, Bảo Như
- Festival date: November 23–27, 2019
- Website: 21st Vietnam Film Festival

Vietnam Film Festival chronology
- 22nd 20th

The 21st Vietnam Film Festival was held from November 23 to November 27, 2019, in Vũng Tàu City, Bà Rịa–Vũng Tàu province, Vietnam, with the slogan "Building a national, humane, creative and integrated Vietnamese film industry" (Vietnamese: "Xây dựng nền công nghiệp điện ảnh Việt Nam dân tộc, nhân văn, sáng tạo và hội nhập").

== Event ==
This is the first film festival held in Vũng Tàu city. The award system this year has not changed. Starting from the 20th Vietnam Film Festival, the organizers have emphasized the "cinematic" nature of this award by removing direct-to-video films from the award system. This film festival is completely a playground for all categories of cinema. The festival continues to have the Audience Choice Award for "Most Favorite Film" to attend the "Panorama Program" in addition to the traditional awards for outstanding individuals and cinematic works in 4 categories: Feature film; Documentary; Science film and Animated film.

In the end, 3 Golden Lotus award were given to films in categories: feature film, documentary film and animated film.

=== Participation ===
According to the regulations of the 21st Vietnam Film Festival, films participating in the festival are those that are licensed to distribute films between September 11, 2017, and September 10, 2019, using the Vietnamese language, produced by Vietnamese film establishments or in cooperation with foreign organizations, individuals and without copyright disputes.

Films participating in the 21st Vietnam Film Festival must be films that have not yet participated in the National Television Festival. Remake films (based on foreign scripts/films) can register to attend all programs of the Festival. In case the film is selected for the "In Competition" section, the awards for individual directors, actors, cinematographers, painters, sound, music, except for films and screenplay writers will be considered.

The total number of films approved for the "In Competition" section this year is 74 films belonging to 4 film genres: 16 feature films, 29 documentaries, 9 science films, and 20 animated films. In addition, the section "Panorama Program" showcases 14 feature films and 16 documentaries.

=== Jury ===
The jury panels of the 21st Vietnam Film Festival were announced on November 8.

Accordingly, the jury in the Feature Film category consists of 9 members:

- Doctor Trần Luân Kim, Former President of Vietnam Cinema Association (Head)
- Actress/producer Trương Ngọc Ánh
- Screenwriter Hoàng Nhuận Cầm
- Director Bùi Tuấn Dũng
- Journalist Hữu Việt
- Director Lê Thanh Sơn
- Composer Trọng Đài
- Painter Nguyễn Trung Phan
- Cinematographer Nguyễn Nam

In the Documentary - Science category, the jury consists of 7 members:

- Director Lê Hồng Chương (Head)
- Journalist Trần Việt Văn
- Journalist Đinh Trọng Tuấn
- Director Vũ Hoài Nam
- Screenwriter Nguyễn Thu Dung
- Director/journalist Tô Hoàng
- Director Nguyễn Tường Phương

The jury of the Animated category consists of 5 members:

- Animator Nguyễn Thị Phương Hoa (Head)
- Master Nguyễn Quang Trung
- Composer Phạm Ngọc Khôi
- Journalist Chu Thu Hằng
- Animator Đỗ Lệnh Hùng Tú

=== Activities ===
Film week to celebrate the 21st Vietnam Film Festival takes place from November 6 to 12, 2019 in Hanoi and Ho Chi Minh City. Film Week is chaired by the Cinema Department (Ministry of Culture, Sports and Tourism), in collaboration with the National Cinema Center and Dcine Joint Stock Company. The opening ceremony of Film Week will take place on the evening of November 6 at the National Cinema Center, 87 Láng Hạ street, Ba Đình district, which is also a movie screening venue of Hanoi. Audiences in Ho Chi Minh City can watch movies at Dcine Bến Thành Cinema, 06 Mạc Đĩnh Chi street, Bến Nghé Ward, District 1. Each film will be screened once a week. 2 invitations is maximum for an audience. Invitation to see the film has been sent by the Cinema Department to the movie screening locations.

From November 23, the Film Festival officially started with many activities to praise and introduce to the public Vietnamese cinematic works imbued with national identity, rich in humanity, with creative imprints; honoring film artists with outstanding artistic achievements. The schedule of activities of the festival is as follows:

November 23:

- Offering incense and visiting Martyrs' Monument in Vũng Tàu City, 7:30.
- Opening of the photo exhibition "Vietnam's seas and islands through a cinematic perspective" (Vietnamese: "Biển đảo Việt Nam qua góc nhìn điện ảnh"). It starts at 9:00 in the Revolutionary Traditional House, 01 Bacu Street, Vũng Tàu City).
- Press conference before the opening of the Film Festival (10:30, at Pullman Vung Tau Hotel).
- The opening ceremony of the 21st Vietnam Film Festival (20:00, at Pullman Vung Tau Hotel).

November 24:

- Seminar on "Film scene in Vietnam" (Vietnamese: "Bối cảnh quay phim tại Việt Nam"). It takes place at 9:00 in Pullman Hotel.
- Exchange of film artists with the audience and students (14:00, at the Provincial Youth Cultural House).

November 25:

- Seminar "Improving the quality of Vietnamese cinema in international integration" (Vietnamese: "Nâng cao chất lượng điện ảnh Việt Nam trong hội nhập quốc tế"). It takes place at 9:00 in Pullman Hotel.
- Exchange of film artists with soldiers of the armed forces (14:00, at the Provincial Youth Cultural House).

November 26:

- Program to visit the scenic spots of Bà Rịa–Vũng Tàu province (from 8:00 to 16:00).
- Rehearsal of Closing and Awards Ceremony (18:00, at Pullman Vung Tau Hotel).

November 27:

- Closing and awarding ceremony of the 21st Vietnam Film Festival (20:00, at Pullman Vung Tau hotel).

During the festival, the cinematographic works of the contest will be screened for free for the audience at cinemas: Lotte Cinema Vũng Tàu (Lotte Mart supermarket, 3/2 street, Vũng Tàu City), CGV Lam Sơn Square (09, Le Lợi street, Vũng Tàu City), CGV Lapen Center (30A, 30/4 street, Vũng Tàu City) and Bà Rịa Cinema (320, Cách Mạng Tháng Tám street, Bà Rịa City). Audiences can come to the above cinemas to receive free movie tickets.

The opening and closing ceremonies were broadcast live on channels: Culture and Tourism TV channel (Vietnam Journey), VTC1, VTC9 and VOV3.

== Official Selection ==
=== Feature film ===
==== In Competition ====
Original title	English title	Director(s)	Production
11 niềm hy vọng	11 Hopes	Robie Nguyễn	Metan Entertainment
100 ngày bên em	100 Days of Sunshine	Vũ Ngọc Phượng	Galaxy M&E, Ingame Online, Kross Pictures
Anh thầy ngôi sao	Superstar Teacher	Đỗ Đức Thịnh	CJ HK Entertainment, Thiên Phúc Entertainment
Cua lại vợ bầu	Win My Baby Back	Nhất Trung	ABC Pictures, NT Studio, NHV Entertainment
Hai Phượng	Furie	Lê Văn Kiệt	Premiere Pictures, Studio68, NHV Entertainment
Hạnh phúc của mẹ	The Happiness of a Mother	Huỳnh Đông	Diệp Cơ Entertainment, PNJ, CGV
Hợp đồng bán mình		Trần Ngọc Phong	Giải Phóng Film
Khi con là nhà	My Son Is My Home	Vũ Ngọc Đãng	Song Ngư Films
Lật mặt: Nhà có khách	Face Off: The Walking Guests	Lý Hải	Lý Hải Productions, Hoàng Phúc International, CGV
Người bất tử	The Immortal	Victor Vu	CJ Entertainment
Nơi ta không thuộc về		Đặng Thái Huyền	People's Army Cinema
Song lang	Song Lang/The Tap Box	Leon Quang Lê	Studio 68, CréaTV
Tháng năm rực rỡ	Go-Go Sisters	Nguyễn Quang Dũng	CJ Entertainment, HKFilm
Thạch Thảo	Forget Me Not	Mai Thế Hiệp	Galaxy M&E, Fortune Projects
Thưa mẹ con đi	Goodbye Mother	Trịnh Đình Lê Minh	(independent film)
Truyền thuyết về Quán Tiên	Wartime Flowers	Đinh Tuấn Vũ	Hồng Ngát Film, DV&H Creative

Highlighted title indicates Golden Lotus winner.

==== Panorama Program ====
Original title	English title	Director(s)	Production
798Mười	798Ten	Dustin Nguyễn	Galaxy M&E, Dream Events
Chị Mười Ba	13rd Sister	Võ Thanh Hòa	Thu Trang Entertainment, Galaxy M&E
Chú ơi, đừng lấy mẹ con!	Please Don't Marry My Mom	Đinh Tuấn Vũ	Midia, CGV, Dung Bình Dương JSC
Giã từ cô đơn		Lê Cung Bắc	(independent film)
Giấc mơ Mỹ	The American Dream	Davina Hồng Ngân	Tincom Media
Hồn papa da con gái	Daddy Issues	Ochiai Ken	Chánh Phương Film
Tháng 5 để dành	Sunset Promise	Lê Hà Nguyên	(independent film)
Thật tuyệt vời khi ở bên em	Heavenly Being with You	Luk Vân	Green Map Films, CGV, ClipTV
Tìm chồng cho mẹ		Thủy Trần	Hổ Cáp Company
Trạng Quỳnh		Đỗ Đức Thịnh	Thiên Phúc Entertainment
Truyện ngắn	Short Stories	Cao Trung Hiếu	Viet Vision
Ước hẹn mùa thu	Autumn Promise	Nguyễn Quang Dũng	Galaxy M&E, HKFilm
Vô gian đạo		Trần Việt Anh	Avatar Entertainment
Vu quy đại náo	The Perfect Wedding	Lê Thiện Viễn	Liveon, CJ HK Entertainment

Highlighted title indicates the most favorite film voted by the audience.

== Awards ==
=== Feature film ===
Award		Winner
Film	Golden Lotus	Song Lang
Film	Silver Lotus	Win My Baby Back; Furie; Wartime Flowers
Film	Jury's Merit	100 Days of Sunshine
Film	Audience Choice	Please Don't Marry My Mom
Best Director		Leon Quang Lê – Song Lang
Best Actor		Trấn Thành – Win My Baby Back
Best Actress		Hoàng Yến Chibi – Go-Go Sisters
Best Supporting Actor		Isaac – Song Lang
Best Supporting Actress		Mai Cát Vi – Furie
Best Screenplay		Nhất Trung – Win My Baby Back
Best Cinematography		Nguyễn K'Linh – The Immortal
Best Art Design		Ghia Phạm – Song Lang
Best Original Score		Trần Mạnh Hùng – Wartime Flowers
Best Sound Design		Vũ Thành Long – Song Lang

=== Documentary/Science film ===
==== Documentary film ====
Award		Winner
Film	Golden Lotus	Chông chênh
Film	Silver Lotus	Chư Tan Kra; Joris Ivens và ngọn gió Việt Nam
Film	Jury's Merit	Ở nơi cửa ngõ Hoàng Sa; Trại Davis; Điểm tựa bình yên
Best Director		Trần Tuấn Hiệp – Ở nơi cửa ngõ Hoàng Sa, Ông Hai Lúa, Thanh niên cứu quốc thành Hoàng Diệu
Best Screenplay		Tạ Thị Huệ – Lão gàn Hồ Mơ
Best Cinematography		Tạ Đức Nguyên – Tâm tình của gốm
Best Sound Design		Nguyễn Vinh Khoa – Nhớ biển

==== Science film ====
Award		Winner
Film	Golden Lotus	not awarded
Film	Silver Lotus	Cuộc chiến chống đại dịch SARS; Ô nhiễm nhựa ở biển
Film	Jury's Merit	Trầm cảm sau sinh Ghép tạng
Best Director		not awarded
Best Screenplay		Lê Danh Trường – Ghép tạng
Best Cinematography		Nguyễn Thanh Bình – Khu bảo tồn thiên nhiên Xuân Liên
Best Sound Design		Dương Thế Vinh – Trầm cảm sau sinh

=== Animated film ===
Award		Winner
Film	Golden Lotus	Người anh hùng áo vải
Film	Silver Lotus	Vầng sáng ấm áp Sắc màu những ô cửa Bí mật của những đứa trẻ
Film	Jury's Merit	Bí mật hang Duôn; Tàn thể: Tiền truyện
Best Director		Vũ Duy Khánh – Vầng sáng ấm áp
Best Screenplay		Phạm Thị Thanh Hà – Vầng sáng ấm áp
Best Shaping Animator		Bùi Mạnh Quang – Ngôi sao xanh kỳ lạ, Truyền thuyết thác Pongour
Best Acting Animator		The Animator Crew of Người anh hùng áo vải
Best Original Score		Lương Ngọc Châu – Người anh hùng áo vải
Best Sound Design		Nguyễn Duy Long – Bí mật hang Duôn
