= Liên Bỉnh Phát =

Vietnamese actor

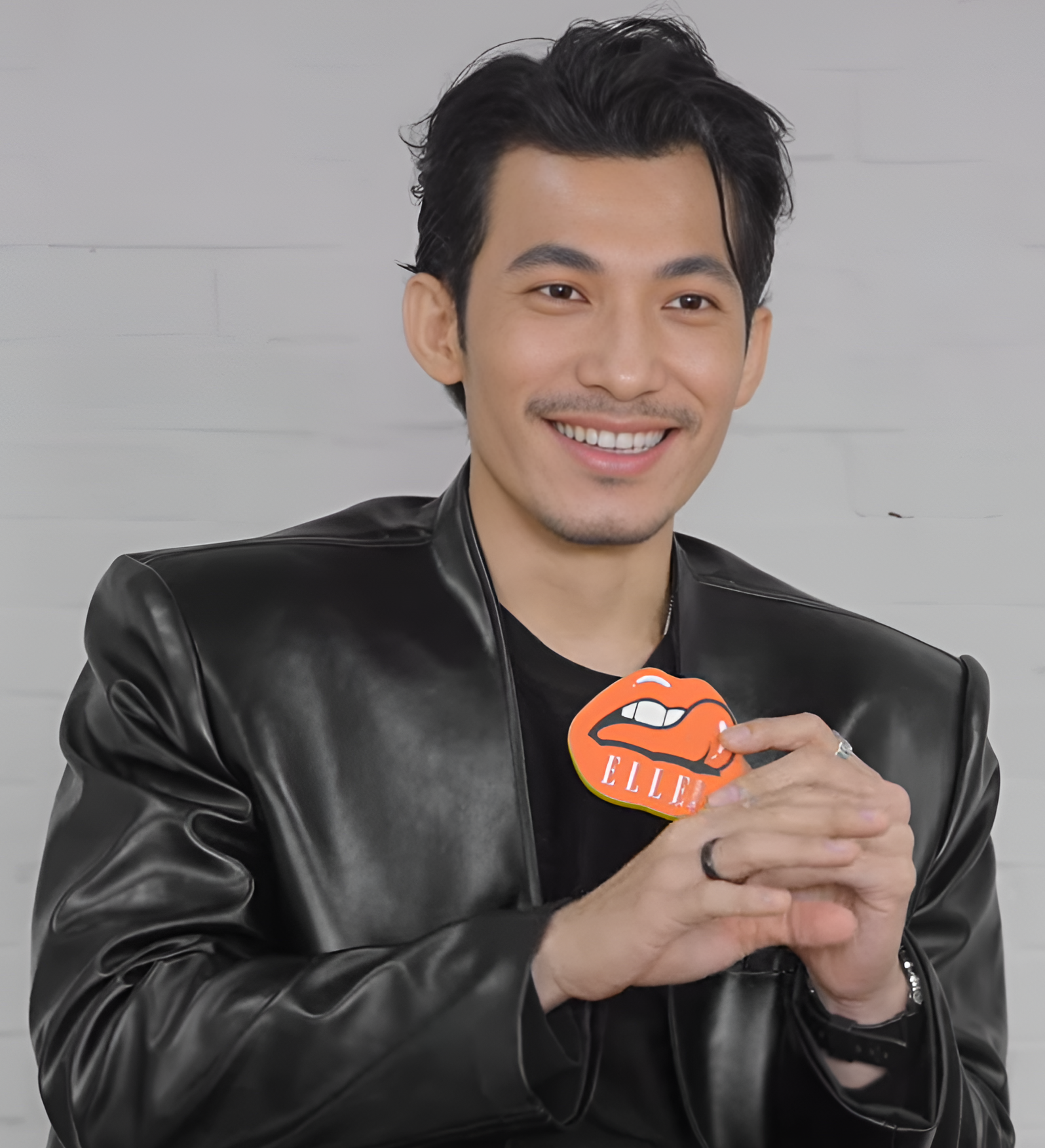
Liên Bỉnh Phát in 2025

Liên Bỉnh Phát (chữ Hán: 連炳發) is a Vietnamese actor, known for his role as Dũng in the film Song lang (2018), as Dr. Phạm Văn Ninh in the Taiwanese drama The Outlaw Doctor (2025), and as Khang in Ky Nam Inn.

His international awards include Gemstone Award at the Tokyo International Film Festival (2018), Asian Stars: Up Next Award at the International Film Festival & Awards Macao (2019), and Best Leading Actor at the Golden Bell Awards (2025); alongside awards in Vietnam that include Breakthrough Actor of the Year at the VCEP Awards (2025) and the Mai Vàng Awards (2025).
