= Song loan =

Percussion instrument from Vietnam

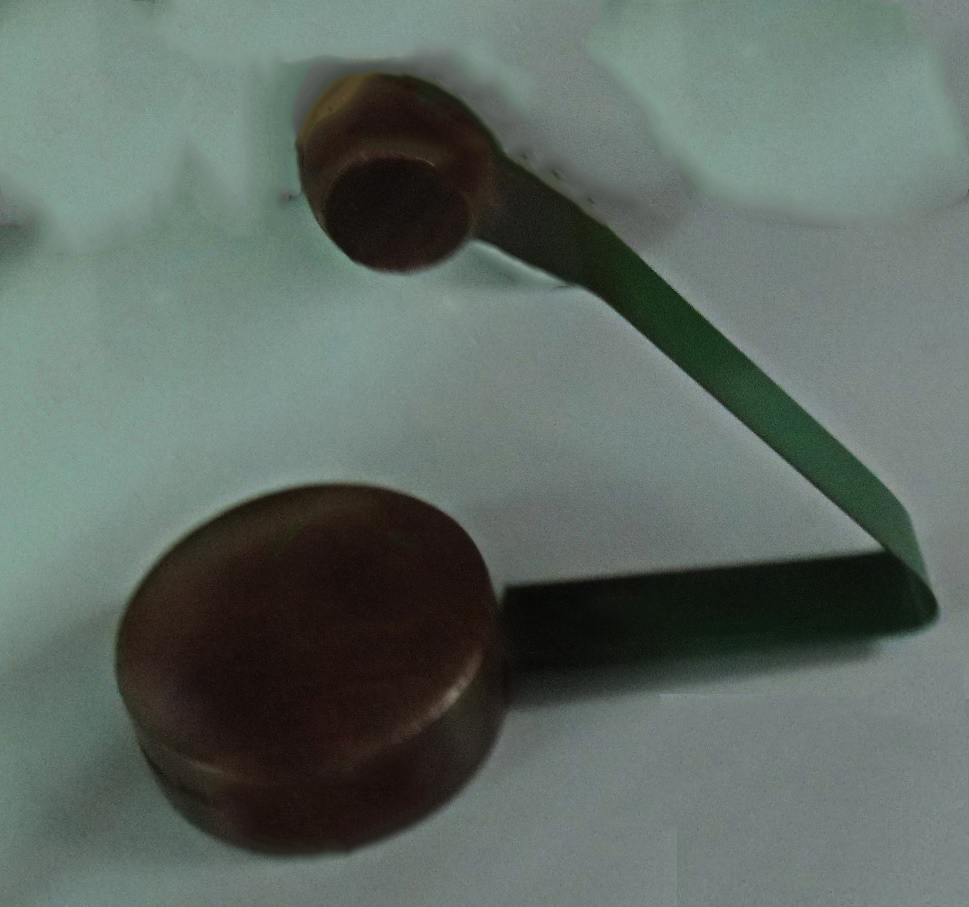
Song loan

A song loan, (Vietnamese pronunciation: [sawŋm˧ lwaːŋ˧]) or song lang or song lan) is a percussion instrument (idiophone) used in Vietnamese traditional music.

== Construction ==
The song loan consists of a hollow wooden body about 7 cm in diameter attached to a flexible curved metal piece ended with a wooden ball.

== Playing ==
It is put on the ground and can be played by using the foot to force the ball to beat the body of the instrument.

== Performance ==
The song loan is mostly used to keep the beat in Vietnamese traditional chamber music such as ca Huế), and theatrical music such as nhạc tài tử and cải lương.

== See also ==
- Castanets
