= The Outlaw Doctor =

2025 Taiwanese crime-medical drama television series

Chinese name
- Traditional Chinese: 化外之醫
Transcriptions
Standard Mandarin
- Tongyong Pinyin: Hùa wài jhī yī
Southern Min
- Tâi-lô: hôa-gōa-tsi-i
- Genre: Crime drama Medical drama
- Written by: Chang Shih-hsien; Wen Yu-fang
- Directed by: Liao Shih Han; Chan Chun-hao
- Starring: Liên Bỉnh Phát; Ning Chang; Weber Yang
- Country of origin: Taiwan
- Original languages: Taiwanese Mandarin, Taiwanese Hokkien
- No. of seasons: 1
- No. of episodes: 11

Production
- Executive producer: Phil Tang
- Production companies: GrX Studio Co., Ltd.

Original release
- Network: Public Television Service
- Release: March 8, 2025 – present

The Outlaw Doctor (Chinese: 化外之醫) is a Taiwanese crime-medical drama television series produced by GrX Studio Co., Ltd. and broadcast on Public Television Service. The series stars Ning Chang and Vietnamese actor Liên Bỉnh Phát, following the story of a Vietnamese doctor in Taiwan who secretly performs illegal medical procedures to raise funds for his mother's expensive medical treatment and is drawn into an underground world of undocumented migrant workers.

== Plot ==
Set against the backdrop of the challenges faced by migrant workers and the healthcare system in Taiwan, the story follows Phạm Văn Ninh (played by Liên Bỉnh Phát), a Vietnamese plastic surgeon who travels to Taiwan to earn money for his mother's exorbitant medical expenses. He secretly engages in illegal medical practice and enters the underground world of undocumented migrant workers, through job referrals from labor broker Liu Tien-cheng (played by Weber Yang). He subsequently becomes entangled in a medical dispute involving neurosurgeon Cheng Wan-ping (played by Ning Chang) from Weida Hospital, and the trio find themselves engulfed in a far more serious crisis concerning migrant workers.

== Actors ==
Actor	Role	Description
Liên Bỉnh Phát	Phạm Văn Ninh	Vietnamese plastic surgeon
Ning Chang	Cheng Wan-ping	Neurosurgeon at Weida Hospital
Weber Yang	Liu Tien-cheng	Owner of Tonghai Manpower Agency
Hsia Teng-hung	Wu Chen-hua	Foreign affairs police officer; because his mother is Indonesian, he speaks Indonesian and has also learned some basic Vietnamese.
Tsai Hsuan Yen	Lin Jing-yu	Nurse in Weida Hospital
Nguyễn Thu Hằng	Hong Yun	Owner of Hong Yun Restaurant

== Awards and nominations ==
Date	Ceremony	Award	Nominee / work	Result
August 24, 2025	7th Asia Contents Awards & Global OTT Awards	Best Asian Content	The Outlaw Doctor	Won
August 24, 2025	7th Asia Contents Awards & Global OTT Awards	Best Screenplay	Chang Shih-hsien, Wen Yu-fang	Nominated
October 18, 2025	60th Golden Bell Awards	Best Drama Series	The Outlaw Doctor	Nominated
October 18, 2025	60th Golden Bell Awards	Best Directing for a Drama Series	Liao Shih-han, Chan Chun-hao	Nominated
October 18, 2025	60th Golden Bell Awards	Best Screenplay for a Drama Series	Chang Shih-hsien, Wen Yu-fang, Wu Dai-yun, Chang Yi-ning, Li Rui-han, Wang You-zhen, Liu Pin-han	Nominated
October 18, 2025	60th Golden Bell Awards	Best Leading Actor in a Drama Series	Liên Bỉnh Phát	Won
October 18, 2025	60th Golden Bell Awards	Best Leading Actress in a Drama Series	Ning Chang	Nominated
October 18, 2025	60th Golden Bell Awards	Best Supporting Actor in a Drama Series	Weber Yang	Won
October 18, 2025	60th Golden Bell Awards	Best Supporting Actress in a Drama Series	Tsai Hsuan Yen	Nominated
October 18, 2025	60th Golden Bell Awards	Best Newcomer in a Drama Series	David Wong	Nominated
October 18, 2025	60th Golden Bell Awards	Best Cinematography for a Drama Series	Li Ming, Zhong Ming-da	Nominated
October 18, 2025	60th Golden Bell Awards	Best Film Editing for a Drama Series	Gao Ming-sheng, Wang Jing-qiao, Lin Jia-ying	Nominated
October 18, 2025	60th Golden Bell Awards	Best Lighting Design for a Drama Series	Chen Guan-ting, Feng Jun-leng	Nominated
October 18, 2025	60th Golden Bell Awards	Best Art Design for a Drama Series	Zheng Zhi-han, Li Yu-feng	Nominated
October 18, 2025	60th Golden Bell Awards	Best Visual Effects for a Drama Series	Tu Wei-ting, Huang Han-qi, Lin Zong-min, Jiang Wei-hong, Li Qian-yin	Nominated
October 18, 2025	60th Golden Bell Awards	Best Original Song for a Drama Series	David Wong	Nominated
October 18, 2025	60th Golden Bell Awards	Best Innovation for a Drama Series	The Outlaw Doctor	Nominated
