= National Television Festival =

- Status: Active
- Genre: Broadcasting
- Venue: no fixed
- Country: Vietnam
- Inaugurated: December 1981; 44 years ago
- Attendance: 1200 delegates in 2019
- Organizer: Vietnam Television and the host city broadcasting station
- Website: National Television Festival

The National Television Festival (Vietnamese: Liên hoan truyền hình toàn quốc) is an annual event in Vietnam organized for professionals in the television industry. The festival provides a forum for participants to exchange experiences, review and evaluate television works produced during the year, and recognize outstanding achievements through awards and honors. It is the biggest television event in Vietnam.

The festival is chaired by Vietnam Television Station, each year in collaboration with a local television station that hosts.

== History ==
=== 1980s ===
The first time the Vietnam International Federation was held, starting from the initiative of Hue Television Station and Ho Chi Minh City Television Station. They asked the leaders of Vietnam Television to organize a festival for television workers.

At the end of 1981, former Vice Chairman of Vietnam Television and Broadcasting Committee, cum Editor-in-Chief of the Central Television Station - Mr. Le Quy - launched the policy of organizing a national television festival with the desire to bring television people throughout the country an opportunity to meet, exchange and improve their professional skills. The TV festival is held before Tet because this is not only a place for production units to celebrate, but also to exchange programs between stations to broadcast during Tet.

The first nationwide television festival took place in 5 days in a simple meeting room of 30m2, consisting of 8 delegations. There were 48 entries in the contest, with categories of news, film, reportage, documentary, music, and theater. The number of monitors of Hue Television Station was too small, the jury had to divide and watch all night.

=== 1990s ===
In the early 90s, the national television festivals were presided over by the Ministry of Culture and Information of Vietnam at that time. The ministry organizes 2 festivals in a year, in which in the summer there are only reportage works and documentaries with 1 judging panel. Journalist Dinh Thanh said that, later, when considering the factors of organizing the International Federation, Vietnam Television decided to organize only one festival each year in January or December, depending on the Lunar New Year calendar, in order to discuss about the program to serve the Tet holiday.

During this time, the number of participants is large. Genres are also different from the present, including Children's Program, Short Reportage, Long Reportage, Documentary Film, Academic Program, Music Program, TV Film, Theater. These categories are maintained for many years. Then there are more Exchanges, dialogues, talks.

Reportage genre every year has the largest number of participating works because all production units can participate. The strength of course belongs to the big TV stations, but many small stations also won gold, because that's where new topics are discovered at the grassroots, going to every corner of the locality.

=== Current ===
Since 2000, the national television festival has continuously innovated and improved in terms of organization as well as the quality of participating works. Every year, at conferences, broadcasters from all over the country come together to discuss new techniques in the television industry. The 40th Festival was scheduled to be held in December 2020 in Ninh Bình, but most of the activities had to be cancelled due to the impact of the COVID-19 pandemic. Only the judging program is held with a limited number of people at the headquarters of Vietnam Television in Hanoi.

Current editions with host cities:

- 15th Festival (1995): Hanoi
- 16th Festival (1996): Ho Chi Minh City
- 17th Festival (1997): Hanoi
- 18th Festival (1998): Huế
- 19th Festival (1999): Vinh
- 20th Festival (2000): Hanoi
- 21st Festival (2001): Nha Trang
- 22nd Festival (2002): Ho Chi Minh City
- 23rd Festival (2003): Hanoi
- 24th Festival (2004): Hạ Long
- 25th Festival (2005): Nha Trang
- 26th Festival (2006): Ho Chi Minh City
- 27th Festival (2007): Haiphong
- 28th Festival (2008): Nha Trang
- 29th Festival (2009): Hanoi
- 30th Festival (2010): Cần Thơ
- 31st Festival (2011): Đà Nẵng
- 32nd Festival (2012): Vinh
- 33rd Festival (2013): Hạ Long
- 34th Festival (2014): Huế
- 35th Festival (2015): Đồng Hới
- 36th Festival (2016): Lào Cai
- 37th Festival (2017): Sầm Sơn, Thanh Hóa
- 38th Festival (2018): Đà Lạt
- 39th Festival (2019): Nha Trang
- 40th Festival (2020): ~~Ninh Bình~~ / Hanoi
- 41st Festival (2023): Haiphong
- 42nd Festival (2025): Bình Định
- 43rd Festival (2027)

== Activities ==
A television festival usually includes the following main activities:

- Ceremonies: Opening ceremony and closing-awarding ceremony
- Seminars: National and International seminars on issues of the television industry
- Photo Exhibition about the activities of the national television industry
- Screennings and Judging
- Charity events at the local

== Regulations ==
=== General ===
- The entries for the contest are TV shows that were broadcast for the first time in that year. Particularly, feature-length TV series and documentary series can start airing from the previous year, but the last episode must be broadcast in the current year.
- Do not send the work of your unit to another unit for competition.
- The same unit does not use the same topic to compete in different genres.
- The jury will not judge works submitted in the wrong category.
- Except for multi-episodes documentary, mid-length and long-length television series, each contest entry is recorded in a single file. If the contestant splits a work into multiple files, each file will be counted as a work.

=== Categories ===
- Children's Program: Each unit is allowed to attend a maximum of 2 programs, each program has a duration of no more than 27 minutes.
- Documentary:
  - Single-episode documentary: Each unit is allowed to participate in a maximum of 2 documentaries, each with a duration of no more than 28 minutes. If participating in 1 documentary, it will not exceed 90 minutes.
  - Multi-episodes Documentary: Each unit can participate in 1 documentary series. The number of episodes of each series from 2 to a maximum of 15 episodes, each episode has a duration of no more than 28 minutes.
  - If a unit participates in both kind of documentary, only 1 film can be submitted for each category.
- Reportage: Each unit is allowed to attend up to 2 reportages, each one has a duration of no more than 13 minutes.
- Thematic or Science/Education Program: Each unit is allowed to attend up to 2 programs, the duration of each program must not exceed 27 minutes.
- Dialogue or Talk Program: Each unit is allowed to attend a maximum of 1 program, the duration of each program must not exceed 60 minutes.
- Program in Ethnic Minority Language: Each unit is allowed to attend up to 2 programs, each program's duration must not exceed 27 minutes:
  - Specifically:
    - Ethnic language special program (without news section): 1 program.
    - Ethnic language cultural and artistic program: 1 program.
  - Each contest program must be accompanied by written comments in Vietnamese (06 sets). Programs with Vietnamese subtitles are encouraged.
- Singing, Choreography, Music Program: Each unit is allowed to attend a maximum of 2 shows with the duration of each program not exceeding 27 minutes. If it is a Musical Film, the duration must be no more than 42 minutes.
- Television Theater: Each unit is allowed to attend a maximum of 2 shows, each program has a duration of no more than 97 minutes.
- Drama: Each unit is allowed to participate in a maximum of 1 single-episode drama, 2 short drama and 1 serial drama.
  - The specific duration is as follows:
    - Single-episode Drama: no more than 105 minutes.
    - Short Drama: Each series has from 2 to 5 episodes, each episode must not exceed 45 minutes.
    - Serial Drama: Each series has from 6 to 60 episodes, each episode must not exceed 45 minutes.
  - There must be a summary of the main content of the drama and each episode, a list of the film crew, and send it to the Organizing Committee of each type of 06 sets to facilitate the jury's work.
  - Dramas with scripts adapted or adapted from foreign literary works are also allowed to compete.

== Awards ==
The National Television Festival awards Gold Prize, Silver Prize and Certificate of Merit to works in different genres. At the latest festival, the jury panels worked on 9 categories as follows:

- Children's Program
- Documentary (single-episode in default and multi-episodes since 2018)
- Reportage
- Thematic or Science/Education Program
- Dialogue or Talk Program
- Program in Ethnic Minority Language
- Singing, Choreography, Music Program
- Television Theater
- Drama (single-episode in default, short & serial since 2003)

Drama and Television Theater categories will have a number of individual awards for directors, scripts and actors depending on each year. Dramas with scripts adapted or adapted from foreign literary works have been allowed to participate in the competition since 2018.

In 2020, in addition to the official prizes, the Organizing Committee will award prizes for excellent works on ethnic and mountainous topics in 8 contest categories (excluding the category of Ethnic Minority Language Program). There is also a "Digital Content Interaction" Award for the audience to vote for the contest entries on the website VTV.vn and applications VTV News, VTVgo (except for the Television Film category).

== See also ==
- Vietnam Film Festival
- Hanoi International Film Festival
