= Le Van Kiet =

Vietnamese filmmaker

Le Van Kiet is a Vietnamese filmmaker, known for directing Furie and The Princess.

Kiet was born on the outskirts of Bien Hoa near Ho Chi Minh City in 1978. He moved to the US when he was 2. He attended UCLA for film studies when he was 20 and graduated from the School of Film and Television.

He went to Vietnam to begin his film career. His film was the 2012 psychological horror film House in the Alley. His films Bay Cap 3 and The Lost Tour: Vietnam were refused release. Furie, released in 2019, stars Veronica Ngo and was released in the US by WellGo USA. His 2022 film The Princess stars Joey King and Dominic Cooper, and was released on Hulu.
