= Furie (film) =

Vietnamese action film

- Film poster
- Directed by: Lê Văn Kiệt
- Screenplay by: A Type Machine screenwriting team
- Produced by: Bey Logan; Trần Bửu Lộc
- Starring: Ngô Thanh Vân; Mai Cát Vy; Phan Thanh Nhiên; Phạm Anh Khoa; Trần Thanh Hoa
- Cinematography: Morgan Schmidt
- Edited by: Quyền Ngô
- Music by: Nguyễn Hoàng Anh
- Production companies: Studio 68; NHV Entertainment
- Distributed by: Lotte Entertainment Vietnam
- Release dates: February 22, 2019 (Vietnam); March 1, 2019 (United States); March 8, 2019 (Canada); September 20, 2019 (China)
- Running time: 98 minutes
- Country: Vietnam
- Language: Vietnamese
- Budget: 1 million USD
- Box office: 10.05 million USD (worldwide); 237.029 billion dong (Vietnam)

Furie (Vietnamese: Hai Phượng) is a 2019 Vietnamese martial arts film directed by Le-Van Kiet. It stars Veronica Ngo, Cát Vy, Phan Thanh Nhiên, Phạm Anh Khoa and Trần Thanh Hoa.

Furie was released on 22 February 2019 in Vietnam and was released on 1 March 2019 in the United States, where it received positive reviews from critics with praise for the action sequences and Ngo's performance. It was selected as the Vietnamese entry for the Best International Feature Film at the 92nd Academy Awards, but it was not nominated.

== Plot ==
Hai Phượng is an ex-gangster who is estranged from her family after her father disowns her for having an affair with a gangster and getting involved with criminal activities. After giving birth to her daughter Mai, Hai Phượng decides to lie low in the countryside, where she works as a debt collector and barely supports her daughter or herself. Mai has been bullied due to Hai Phượng's reputation as a debt collector and for not having a father. Mai wants to stop going to school so that she can support her mother. One day, while in the market Hai Phượng sees Mai being accused of stealing a wallet. The other witness pressures Hai Phượng to take their side, which hurts Mai's feelings and thus she ran away. It is then revealed that Mai was just returning the wallet to a drunk man who lost it. As Hai Phượng tries to find Mai, she quickly realizes that Mai is being captured by thugs.

Hai Phượng tries to catch up to the thugs, but she has to fight through many henchmen. After a lengthy chase, Hai Phượng barely loses them, but not before learning that the thugs are taking Mai to Saigon. Hai Phượng hitches a ride in a truck and finally arrives in Saigon. She then tries to get help from her fellow gangster member, but she is rebuffed. Hai Phượng goes to the police and steals reports of criminals related to missing children. Hai Phượng confronts a criminal named Trực, which results in a brutal fight where at first Trực gains the upper hand, but Hai Phượng manages to turn the tables and nearly kills him, but spares him because of Trực's mother.

Trực then tells the location about the thugs and Hai Phượng finds their base of operations, which reveal that the thugs are using children as illegal child organ donors. She then defeats many henchmen before facing the boss of the operation Thanh Sói. Thanh Sói soundly defeats and knocks her out and tells her henchmen to throw Hai Phượng in the river, but not before Hai Phượng hears the train that Thanh Sói would be taking. Hai Phượng is rescued in the river by Detective Lương, but escapes with the help of a sympathetic nurse. Hai Phượng then goes to her brother for help, but he refuses to help her due to him not getting over the fact that Hai Phượng betrayed their family to become a gangster and never came back to reconcile with them when she left the gangster life and never attended her parents funeral, where he also tells that she is a terrible mother and Mai deserves better. Detective Lương finds Hai Phượng and convinces her to team up with him.

Hai Phượng and Detective Lương finally finds the train, where both of them fight off the henchmen. While on the train, Thanh Sói tells her henchmen to change the train tracks on her signal as well as split the train. Hai Phượng confronts Thanh Sói and finally kills her, but not before the train tracks switch, splitting the train apart. Hai Phượng reunites with Mai and quickly defeats the remaining thugs, but is shot in the chest by a random thug. The thug plans to kill her, but Detective Lương kills the thug. Hai Phượng is hospitalized and makes amends with her brother. Mai is treated well by her peers and Hai Phượng promises Mai she will teach her how to fight.

== Cast ==
- Veronica Ngo as Hai Phượng, an Vovinam skilled ex-gangster.
- Cát Vy as Mai, Hai's daughter
- Phan Thanh Nhiên as Detective Lương
- Phạm Anh Khoa as Trực
- Trần Thanh Hoa as Thanh Sói

== Release ==
=== In Theaters ===
Furie was released in Vietnam on February 22, 2019, and in the United States on March 1. Previously, the film was scheduled for release in the fall of 2018, but it was delayed to early 2019 due to distribution agreements in other countries.

On February 12, 2019, Studio 68, Well Go USA Entertainment, and Arclight Films announced an agreement to release the film in the United States, making it the first Vietnamese film to achieve this. On September 4, it was announced that the film would be released in the Chinese market starting September 20, making it the first Vietnamese film to be shown in China and one of the few foreign films distributed there due to the country's strict film censorship policies by the government.

=== Home Media ===
In March 2019, Netflix signed an agreement with Studio 68 to acquire the film's rights, and officially released it globally on Netflix starting May 22. In the North America market, the film was released on Netflix in September 2019. The film was also made available on several on-demand services in the United States, including iTunes, Comcast, Amazon, Google Play Movies & TV, Vudu, Playstation, Xbox, Fandango, Charter, and DirecTV.

== Reception ==
=== Box office revenue ===
Hai Phượng grossed 122.899 billion dong in the Vietnamese market and approximately 5.161 million USD in other countries, bringing its total global revenue to 5.756 million USD. It is the second highest-grossing Vietnamese film of all time, the highest opening weekend gross for a Vietnamese film of all time, and the highest-grossing Vietnamese film of 2019. On March 26, 2019, Hai Phượng surpassed the 200 billion dong revenue mark, becoming the first Vietnamese film to achieve this milestone.

=== Critical reception ===
The review aggregator website Rotten Tomatoes reported an approval rating of 95%, with an average score of 6.4/10, based on 21 reviews. Cary Darling of Houston Chronicle wrote: "The next time Jennifer Garner wants to do an action movie like the flavorless “Peppermint,” she could take a few lessons from Veronica Ngo, the explosively charismatic star of the head-cracking, bone-breaking Vietnamese martial-arts slam-o-rama “Furie,” perhaps the most entertaining film of its type since The Raid 2 blasted out of Indonesia five years ago." On the Internet Movie Database, the film has an average score of 6.3/10, based on 65 reviews, indicating "generally favorable reviews".

Hà Tuyết of Zing News praised the film's intensity, writing: "The numerous action scenes in the film show meticulous investment. The audience is treated to fast, sharp blows through various camera angles and quick, seamless transitions. Techniques like slow motion or shaky cam to create effects are almost not used in the film." Douglas Davidson of Elements of Madness rated the film four out of five, praising its personal and relatable nature, writing: "The film begins with the protagonist's profession to help the audience understand her character and fighting style. Then, it showcases her personal values before introducing her daughter. Once the conflict between these two characters is established, the series of action scenes begins." In contrast, Minh Tranh of Tuổi Trẻ Online commented: "Visually impressive in terms of action, but the script of Hai Phượng is so simple that it feels rather superficial. What made Hai Phượng become such a reckless and disillusioned person despite being born into a relatively peaceful family is never explained."

=== Awards ===
Awards	Date	Category	Nominee	Result	Ref
Osaka Asian Film Festival	March 17, 2019	Best Film	Hai Phượng	Nominated	
Osaka Asian Film Festival	March 17, 2019	Best Actress	Ngô Thanh Vân	Nominated	
Vietnam Film Festival	November 27, 2019	Best Feature Film	Hai Phượng	Silver Lotus	
Vietnam Film Festival	November 27, 2019	Best Actress	Ngô Thanh Vân	Nominated	
Vietnam Film Festival	November 27, 2019	Best Supporting Actress	Mai Cát Vi	Won	
Blue Star Awards	December 27, 2019	Best Actress in a Motion Picture	Ngô Thanh Vân	Won	
Blue Star Awards	December 27, 2019	Best Supporting Actress	Trần Thanh Hoa	Won	
Academy	February 9, 2020	Best International Feature Film	Hai Phượng	Preliminary round	
Golden Kite	May 12, 2020	Best Feature Film	Hai Phượng	Silver Kite	
Golden Kite	May 12, 2020	Best Art Design	Nguyễn Minh Đương	Won	

== See also ==
- List of submissions to the 92nd Academy Awards for Best International Feature Film
- List of Vietnamese submissions for the Academy Award for Best International Feature Film
