= Goodbye Mother =

- Film poster
- Vietnamese: Thưa mẹ con đi
- Directed by: Trịnh Đình Lê Minh
- Starring: Lãnh Thanh; Võ Điền Gia Huy; Hồng Đào
- Release date: 16 August 2019
- Running time: 106 minutes
- Country: Vietnam
- Language: Vietnamese

Goodbye Mother (Vietnamese: Thưa mẹ con đi) is a Vietnamese socio-psychological film that explores the theme of LGBT issues. It marks the directorial debut of Trịnh Đình Lê Minh. The film was released in 2019 and features the main cast of Lãnh Thanh and Gia Huy. The movie depicts the situation that a Vietnamese young man faces when he and his same-sex partner visit his family in the rural areas of Vietnam after several years of living in the United States.

The film has received numerous positive reviews and has been released and screened at various international film festivals.

== Synopsis ==
After years of studying in the United States, Van and his boyfriend, Ian, return to Vietnam to visit Van's family on the day of relocating his father's grave. Van's extended family includes his grandmother, who is suffering from memory loss, his widowed mother, uncles and aunts, two cousins. As the eldest grandson, Van faces pressure from his family to find a wife and have children to continue the family line according to Eastern cultural customs. Van and Ian must discreetly express affection for each other to avoid discovery by the family. Van promises to talk to his family about their relationship when the time is right.

Due to confusion, Van's grandmother mistakes Ian for Van and witnesses them kissing. She questions Ian about their relationship, and he candidly explains everything. On the day of the father's death anniversary, Van's uncle asks him about marriage plans, and Van responds that he will marry "soon." Hearing this, the grandmother becomes angry, thinking that Van has betrayed his lover, Ian. When Van's mother asks about his future intentions, he reveals that he plans to start a family in the United States and sponsor his mother to join him.

Ian becomes frustrated with the need to conceal their relationship and demands that Van openly acknowledge it. Van, feeling conflicted, learns about his mother's serious illness and shares the difficult situation with Ian, unaware that his mother overhears the conversation.

While walking on the street, Ian is harassed by Van's younger cousin and friends, who steal his phone. A confrontation ensues, leading to Van hitting the cousin, further escalating tensions within the family.

The film concludes as Van's mother accompanies Ian back to the United States. Van promises to sponsor his mother's move to the U.S. At the airport, Ian reveals that Van's mother wished them happiness together.

== Release ==
The film had its premiere on August 14, 2019, in Ho Chi Minh City and was subsequently released in theaters across Vietnam two days later. Additionally, it participated in various international film festivals, including the Busan International Film Festival, Pride Seoul International Film Festival (South Korea), Hawaii International Film Festival, and the San Diego Asian Film Festival (USA). On March 14, 2020, the film was released in Taiwan. In Vietnam, the movie was later made available on the Netflix platform, becoming the only domestic film to make it into the top 10 most-watched films on Netflix in Vietnam in April 2020. The film premiered in Japan on the Rakuten TV platform in January 2021 and became one of the top-selling foreign films on the platform in the first half of 2021.

== Awards ==
- Audience Choice Award for Best Feature Film (voted by the audience) at the Toronto Reel Asian International Film Festival 2020.
- Audience Choice Award for Best Feature Film (voted by the audience) at the Philadelphia Asian American Film Festival 2020.
