= Song Lang =

2018 Vietnamese film

- Directed by: Leon Le
- Written by: Leon Le; Nguyễn Thị Minh Ngọc
- Produced by: Veronica Ngo
- Starring: Isaac; Liên Bỉnh Phát; Kiều Trinh; Kim Phương; Thanh Tú; Minh Phượng; Hữu Quốc; Tú Quyên; Cát Vy; Bảo Xuyên; Thạch Kim Long; Lệ Thi
- Cinematography: Bob Nguyễn
- Edited by: Leon Le
- Music by: Tôn Thất An
- Production companies: Studio68 and CréaTV
- Distributed by: GagaOOLaLa Breaking Glass Pictures
- Release date: August 17, 2018
- Running time: 101 minutes
- Country: Vietnam
- Language: Vietnamese

Song Lang is a 2018 Vietnamese musical drama film directed and edited by Leon Le, and is also his debut film. The film is produced by Ngô Thanh Vân and Irene Trinh, based on the script written by Leon Le and Nguyen Thi Minh Ngoc. The film is produced by The Creatv Company and Studio68 and distributed by Lotte Entertainment, with the participation of Isaac, Liên Bỉnh Phát, Minh Phuong, Tu Quyen, Kieu Trinh and Thanh Tu. Set in Ho Chi Minh City in the 1980s, the film revolves around the relationship between Linh Phung, the lead singer of the cai luong troupe Thien Ly, and Dung, a debt collector from a cai luong family. Throughout the film, cai luong music is highlighted and plays a leading role in the entire story line. The film's title itself is also named after a musical instrument that plays the role of keeping the beat in cai luong.

The script for Song Lang was conceived by Leon Le in 2012. However, because the original idea was not feasible, after a few years he sought out writer Nguyen Thi Minh Ngoc to rewrite a more suitable script. Leon Le spent a year looking for investors for the project but was rejected; Ngo Thanh Van was the last producer he sent the script to and she agreed to produce the work after only two days of reading the script. The film began filming in October 2017. The filming process took place over 32 non-consecutive days, with scenes mainly taken in District 5 of Ho Chi Minh City. Leon Le and composer Hoang Song Viet completely rewrote the lyrics of the cai luong segments in the work; The pop music and ancient music parts were also invested and harmonized with the instruments of a theater troupe in the 1980s.

Song Lang had a press conference to premiere at Lotte Cinema Nam Saigon in Ho Chi Minh City on August 16, 2018 and officially screened commercially in Vietnamese cinemas from August 17, 2018 in 2D format. After its release, the film received many compliments from the audience and critics but did not achieve great commercial success, only earning less than 5 billion VND compared to a production cost of up to 20 billion VND. Song Lang has won many major Vietnamese film awards, including the Golden Lotus Prize for Best feature films at the 21st Vietnam Film Festival and the Silver Kite Prize for Best feature films at the 2018 Kite Awards. Since the end of 2018, the film has been sent to premiered at many international film festivals, including the Tokyo International Film Festival and the Beijing International Film Festival, earning more than 30 awards at these film events, and is said to be the Vietnamese film that has won the most international awards ever. Song Lang was also released commercially in Japan and the United States.

== Plot ==
In Ho Chi Minh City in the 1980s, Dung – nicknamed "Thien Loi" – was a debt collector for Aunt Nga, ready to abuse customers who were slow to pay their debts – one of those customers was a family with a husband and wife with two small children. Dung's parents used to follow a cai luong theater troupe, but his mother – Hong Dieu – could not stand the situation so she left the family when he was young. One day, Dung went to Thien Ly cai luong theater to collect his debt. When the pregnant woman of the cai luong troupe asked to pay off her debt, Dung pulled out all the troupe's stage costumes and tried to burn them with gasoline. Linh Phung – the male lead of the troupe – entered the room just in time, took off his watch and gold chain and gave it to Dung to accept temporarily, but Dung did not take it and silently left. The next night, Dung bought tickets to see the cai luong My Chau – Trong Thuy, with Linh Phung playing the role of Trong Thuy, and Thuy Van herself playing the role of My Chau. Dung was fascinated by Linh Phung's beauty and voice. After the play ended, Dung went backstage and suddenly met Linh Phung. Linh Phung took the money to pay off the troupe's debt to Dung. Dung and Lan, Aunt Nga's daughters, also often make love to each other every night.

One day, Linh Phung was sitting alone at a restaurant when a customer started a fight. He threw water in Linh Phung's face and expressed contempt for cai luong artists. Linh Phung was angry and started a fight with the guest, but he was beaten until he fainted on the floor. Dung, who happened to be there, fought back against the aggressor and chased them out of the restaurant. Waking up at Dung's house, Linh Phung regretted missing the cai luong performance that night and rushed out, but realized that he had lost the key so he returned to Dung's house. At first, the two were confused, but after playing video games together, they gradually became closer. When the neighborhood suddenly black-out and had no other choice, Dung invited Linh Phung out to eat. During this time, Dung revealed that his father was a cai luong accompanist. Linh Phung also shared that his parents were against him becoming a cai luong artist but in the end they still accepted to let him pursue his dream. However, on the way to see their son perform on stage for the first time as a male lead, both of them died in a bus accident.

Returning to Dung's house, Linh Phung found on Dung's desk the book that Linh Phung loved so much. In the middle of that book is a sheet of paper with lyrics that Dung's father wrote in the past. Dung asked Linh Phung to sing along with what his father had written, but Linh Phung refused because he could not sing without musical accompaniment. Dung then took dan nguyet and song lang out of the box and accompanied Linh Phung's singing; Dung reminisces about his father, a man whose marriage failed and his wife left him. Linh Phung was very impressed with Dung's skills and advised him to return to cai luong, which was his family's tradition.

The next morning, Linh Phung woke up. He went to repair the key and saw a necklace hanging on the lock so he bought it and wrapped it as a gift to give to Dung. After learning that the wife of the family whose debt he had come to collect her debt committed suicide because he did not have enough money to pay, Dung sold his property to pay off the family's debt, and told Aunt Nga that he would quit his job. That night, Dung came to the door of the cai luong theater with the guitar his father left behind. At the same time, Linh Phung was also performing the play My Chau – Trong Thuy inside. At the doorstep, Dung was stabbed in the back by the husband of the wife who committed suicide and collapsed. At the same time, Linh Phung on stage also seemed to feel Dung's death. It rained and Dung's body was taken away by an ambulance. After the play ended, Linh Phung also walked out of the theater and returned home.

== Themes ==
The name of the movie Song Lang is taken from the name of a musical instrument that controls the rhythm in cai luong, don ca tai tu and ca Hue, carrying many concepts not only on stage but also in the spiritual life of the artist. The phrase "song lang" in the work is also subtly inserted by the director to refer to the two men. Although the song lang is not essentially a main instrument, the fact that a cai luong cannot lack the song lang rhythm also symbolizes that Linh Phung and Dung cannot live without each other, and according to Leon Le, "Linh Phung is Dung's song lang".

I determined from the beginning that the two characters would barely touch each other. I wanted to keep the film's clarity of early life's vibrations. Why do characters who love each other have to have kissing or sex scenes? I want to show love from other levels.

— Leon Lê in an interview for ZNews

Many viewers, after watching the film, asked themselves questions about the relationship between the two characters Dung and Linh Phung: Is it love, or is it simply the sympathy, connection, and compassion in a moment of two strange souls who are extremely lonely? Writer Quang Duc of Zing News compares this relationship to the chemistry between the two main characters in the Korean film The King and the Clown, "a kind of brotherly love, in sympathy, that cannot be named", in which "Isaac's eyes and appearance as Linh Phung are similar to those of Lee Joon-gi as Lee Gong-gil, a very feminine look. While Liên Bỉnh Phát and Dung Thien Loi as Kam Woo-sung as Jang-saeng, also dusty and careless." This writer also commented on the love scene between Dung and Lan that completely "did not reveal a bit of male or female skin, [...] the director must have had an intention. There are many details to prove that Dung and his girlfriend is not just a passing relationship, but no one can answer who Dung truly loves. Some other assumptions made by the audience are that Dung is bisexual, or that only the character Linh Phung has an unrequited love for Dung.

== Production ==
The script was initially rejected by many almost all of the producers in Vietnam before it was picked up by Veronica Ngo from Studio68. Ngo wanted the two main characters Dũng and Linh Phụng to have more on screen physical contact, but Le firmly refused. When asked about his choice of actors, Le stated that he saw Phung's "fragility and loneliness" in Isaac whereas newcomer Liên Bỉnh Phát has the appearance and soul of Dung.

Most of the urban scenes were shot in Hồ Chí Minh City's District 5 as Le considered it to still have the rustic beauty that the entire city once had.

== Reception ==
=== Box office ===
In Vietnam, Song Lang grossed nearly 5 billion VND compared to a production cost of 20 billion VND, considered a loss because it did not surpass the break-even point. The film was released at the same time as Alpha, Case Closed: Zero the Enforcer, and early screenings of My Mr. Wife. After three days of release, the film was revealed to have a higher opening weekend revenue than the previous opening weekend revenue of The Tailor (2017) – a work also produced by Ngô Thanh Vân. Sources said that the number of viewers to see Song Lang was not as high as My Mr. Wife, even though the screenings of this film were only early screenings.

Explaining the film's low appeal, some journalists believe the main reason is that Song Lang belongs to the art film genre that incorporates traditional cultural elements. The film did not cater to the familiar tastes of the masses, while the majority of the audience who went to the cinema were teenagers aged 15–25, who were largely unaware of traditional art appreciation.

=== Accolades ===
To date, the film has won a total of 52 awards, including Gemstone Award at Tokyo International Film Festival, Audience Choice Award at the 2019 editions of New York Asian Film Festival, Seattle LGBT Film Festival, Viet Film Fest, Asian American Int' Film Festival, Frameline San Francisco International LGBTQ Film Festival, Madrid's LGBT film festival LesGaiCineMad and Best New Director at Beijing International Film Festival.

Online publication New Mandala praised Song Lang for "its honest portrait of Saigon as a city in the middle of cultural, social and political transitions" and "microscopic attention to objects that were used in the everyday lives of Saigonese at that time" and The Hollywood Reporter called it "a uniquely Vietnamese hybrid of Wong Kar-wai's In the Mood for Love and Richard Linklater's Before Sunrise".

On review aggregator website Rotten Tomatoes, the film has a 100% approval rating based on seven reviews, with an average rating of 8.6/10.
