= 2018 VTV Awards =

- Date: September 7, 2018
- Site: Studio S14, VTV Headquarters, Ngọc Khánh Ward, Ba Đình District, Hanoi
- Hosted by: Minh Hà, Thành Trung (Leading); Đức Bảo, Mai Trang (Backstage)

Television coverage
- Network: VTV1
- Duration: 140 minutes

The 2018 VTV Awards (Vietnamese: Ấn tượng VTV - Sắc màu 2018) is a ceremony honouring the outstanding achievement in television on the Vietnam Television (VTV) network from August 2017 to July 2018. It took place on September 7, 2018 in Hanoi and hosted by Minh Hà & Thành Trung.

== Winners and nominees ==
(Winners denoted in bold)

Impressive Drama
**Cả một đời ân oán** **(Life of Love and Feud)**; Ghét thì yêu thôi (I Love You Because I Hate You); Cung đường tội lỗi (The Way of Sins); Mộng phù hoa (Sumptuous Dream); Ngày ấy mình đã yêu (Those Days We Fell In Love)
Impressive Actor	Impressive Actress
**Hồng Đăng** - **Cả một đời ân oán** **(Life of Love and Feud)**; Mạnh Trường - Ngược chiều nước mắt (Tears in Reverse), Cả một đời ân oán (Life of Love and Feud); Lê Vũ Long - Tình khúc bạch dương (Love Stories in the Land of Birch); Nhan Phúc Vinh - Ngày ấy mình đã yêu (Those Days We Fell In Love); Chí Thiện - Ngày ấy mình đã yêu (Those Days We Fell In Love)	**Lan Phương** - **Cả một đời ân oán** **(Life of Love and Feud)**; Hồng Diễm - Cả một đời ân oán (Life of Love and Feud); Thanh Hương - Thương nhớ ở ai (The Plethora of Yearning); Nhã Phương - Ngày ấy mình đã yêu (Those Days We Fell In Love); Bảo Thanh - Ngày ấy mình đã yêu (Those Days We Fell In Love)
Impressive TV Presenter	Impressive Singer
**Ngô Kiến Huy**; Hữu Bằng; Minh Hà; Minh Trang; Hạnh Phúc	**Mỹ Tâm**; Ngọt; Trọng Hiếu; Tùng Dương; Đức Phúc
Impressive Topical Image
**The people of the country celebrate the victory of Vietnam's U23 football team and the image of Vietnamese team at** **the Changzhou Stadium in the match against Uzbekistan** **(by Sports Programs Production Committee)**; The firefighter whose hand get burned in the fire case in Carina apartment (by VTV24 Center); Officers go to the pagoda during office hours (by VTV24 Center); Titanium mining devastates the environment (by VTV24 Center); The tricks of abstracting gasoline from tank truck (by VTV24 Center)
Impressive Documentary	Impressive Cultural/Social Science/Educational Program
**VTV Đặc biệt: Hành trình bất tận** **(VTV Special: Endless Journey)**; Việt Nam trong tôi: Bản tình ca của đá (Vietnam In Me: The Love Song of Stone); VTV Đặc biệt: Miền đất hứa (VTV Special: The Promised Land); VTV Đặc biệt: Về quê hương mẹ (VTV Special: Back to Mother's Hometown); VTV Đặc biệt: Ánh sáng tháng 10 (VTV Special: The October Light)	**Điều ước thứ 7: Bản hòa tấu cha và con** **(The Saturday Wish: Father and Son Ensemble)**; Thầy cô chúng ta đã thay đổi (Our Teachers Has Changed); Mười ngày rung chuyển thế giới (Ten Days that Shook the World); Thay lời tri ân: Người thầy (As the Words of Gratitude 2017); Việc tử tế: Không để ai bị bỏ lại phía sau (The Kindly Work: Don't Let Anyone Be Left Behind)
Figure of the Year	Program of the Year
**Vietnam national under-23 football team**; Lương Xuân Trường; Giang Brothers; Lê Hương Giang (The blind MC); Nguyễn Hải An (Little girl who donates cornea)	**Gặp nhau cuối năm - Táo Quân 2018** **(Kitchen Gods 2018)**; Du xuân Mậu Tuất 2018: Nhân và Mộc (Spring Travel 2018: Plant and Human); Thương vụ bạc tỷ (Shark Tank Vietnam); Đào mai tương ngộ (Tet-Flowers Get-Together); Từ những cậu bé chân trần đến những người hùng sân cỏ (From Boys with Barefoot to Football Heroes)

== Presenters ==
Order	Presenter	Award
1	Lê Hương Giang, Thành Trung	Impressive TV Presenter
2	Professor Vũ Minh Giang	Impressive Cultural/Social Science/Educational Program
3	Hồ Quang Lợi, Nhã Phương	Impressive Topical Image
4	Xuân Nghị, Bảo Thanh	Impressive Actor
5	Lê Minh Tuấn	Impressive Actress
6	Nguyễn Như Vũ, Lan Phương	Impressive Documentary
7	Thành Lộc, Kiều Anh	Impressive Singer
8	Hồng Thanh Quang, Mỹ Linh	Impressive Drama
9	Nguyễn Thành Lương, Đỗ Mỹ Linh	Figure of the Year
10	Trần Bình Minh	Program of the Year

== Special performances ==
Order	Artist	Performed
1	Đông Hùng & Vicky Nhung	"Vẽ"
2	Văn Mai Hương	"Gọi cầu vồng"
3	Quốc Khánh, Công Lý, Việt Bắc	Kitchen Gods comedy skits
4	Thanh Lam & Choir of Flames	"Này chân đất ơi"
5	Tùng Dương	"Đường xa tuyết trắng" (Hai phía chân trời OST) "Mãi chỉ là giấc mơ" (Tình khúc bạch dương OST)
6	Mỹ Linh, Hà Lê & Choir of Flames	"Bài ca tự do"
7	Trọng Hiếu	"Green Groove (Cứ thế bay)"
8	Trọng Hiếu (with special appearance of Đình Tú & Phương Anh from Ghét thì yêu thôi)	"Vẽ thế giới"
9	Hồng Duyên (ft. Thanh Hương with Bình Minh instrumental group)	"Trầu không" (Thương nhớ ở ai OST)
