= Ca Huế =

Form of classical Vietnamese music

Ca Huế ("Huế chamber music") is a Vietnamese traditional music genre that has been developed for a long time, believed to date back to the era of the Nguyễn lords in the ancient land of Thuan Hoa, now Huế city.

Ca Huế is a form of chamber music performed in an intimate settings where a small group of artists sing and play together. Its melodies and compositions have attained a high level of refinement in both music and lyrics, often carrying poetic and lyrical content. The lyrics express loves for the homeland and humanity, personal emotions and reflections on life. Historically, Ca Huế was often performed in the royal palaces, mansions, and gardens of mandarins and kings. Kings, queens, and mandarins not only supported the singers and musicians but also actively contributed by designing the instruments, composing lyrics, playing music, and developing techniques which shaped the unique elegance and artistry of Ca Huế.

Ca Huế is more than a musical genre. It is a symbol of pride in national heritage, where Vietnamese culture continues to live through its melodies. Today, Ca Huế remains a lasting source of inspiration for those who cherish traditional folk art and for visitors who wish to explore the rich cultural heritage of Huế.

In 2015, Ca Hue was recognized as a National Intangible Cultural Heritage of Vietnam according to Decision No. 1877/QD-BVHTTDL issued on June 8, 2015.

== History ==
Discussing the origins of Ca Huế, poet Ưng Bình Thúc Giạ Thị wrote that the exact time when this art first appeared cannot be determined through history or poetry. It can only be inferred from the flourishing era of literature. The beginning of this art form is believed to date back to the time of Lord Hiếu Minh. Lord Hiếu Minh, also known as Thiên Túng Đạo Nhơn, was a great patron of literature and an accomplished poet. His son, Mr. Tứ (i.e., Đán), and his grandson, Mr. Dục, were both renowned for their literary talents. During that period of royal encouragement of literature, the royal court must have had its own musical ensemble. Talented individuals would gather and respond to one another through music and composing new songs. Songs for any occasion had already been developed based on the musical scale known as “Xàng Xê Xự”. As long as the performance was artistic and heartfelt with harmonious rhymes, smooth phrasing, clear meanings, and fluid rhythm, it would become a song that was both easy to sing and pass down into the royal court.

According to Professor Dr. Trần Văn Khê, there is no historical record clearly indicating when Ca Huế originated. What is known, however, is that Ca Huế is not a form of folk music, as it was performed exclusively for the nobility or within the royal court. Therefore, it can be regarded as a genre of court music rather than folk music.

Regarding the origin of the name, author Ưng Bình Thúc Giạ Thị explained that the term Ca Huế derives from the fact that the accents of people from Huế are particularly well suited to its melodies. He also noted that the accents of people from Quảng Trị and Quảng Bình provinces could suit it as well, while it is more difficult for those from north of Linh Giang and from south of the Hải Vân Pass to sing correctly.

== Ca Huế in contemporary life ==
Today, Ca Huế is often performed at festivals, cultural exchanges, and in intimate chamber settings. This traditional art form continues to be preserved and passed on through research, teaching, practice, and performance activities organized by professional training institutions, cultural centers, theaters, and Ca Huế clubs.

Since 2019, the program “Bringing Ca Huế Heritage into schools”, organized by the Department of culture and sports in collaboration with the Department of education and training of Huế City, has provided training for teachers and students across schools in Huế.

Furthermore, competitions and initiatives to compose new lyrics inspired by traditional Ca Huế melodies have been promoted to enrich and diversify the content of this art form. Performing Ca Huế on boats along the Hương river has also become a distinctive cultural experience for visitors to Huế.

== Typical songs in Ca Huế performance ==
From Huế chamber music

- Cổ bản
- Cung nam
- Hành vân
- Lộng điệp
- Nam ai
- Nam bình
- Nam xuân
- Phú lục
- Quả phụ
- Tương tư khúc
- Tứ đại cảnh

From Nhã Nhạc of Huế court music

- Đăng đàn cung
- Long ngâm
- Lưu thủy
- Ngũ đối thượng
- Thập thủ liên hoàn: Phẩm tuyết, Nguyên tiêu, Hồ quảng, Liên hoàn, Bình bán, Tây mai, Kim tiền, Xuân phong, Long hổ, Tẩu mã

== Instruments ==
As a blend of vocals and instrumental music, Ca Huế is accompanied by a traditional orchestra. The ensemble provides both harmony and support, featuring typical instruments such as:

- Đàn Bầu
- Đàn Nguyệt
- Đàn Nhị
- Đàn Tam
- Đàn Tranh
- Đàn Tỳ bà
- Sênh tiền, Phách

== Documentary pictures ==
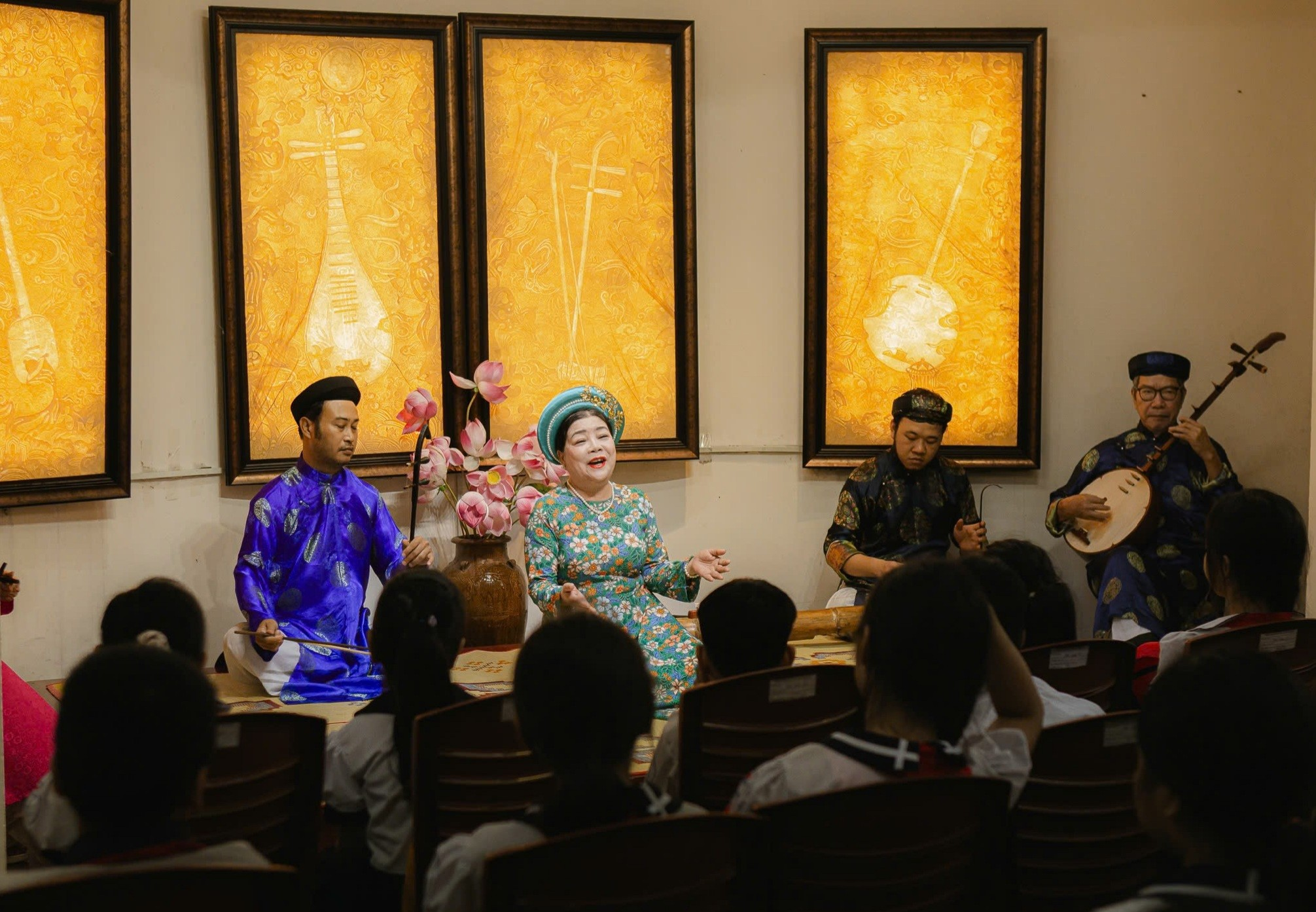
Hue chamber music performance at 25 Le Loi, Hue city

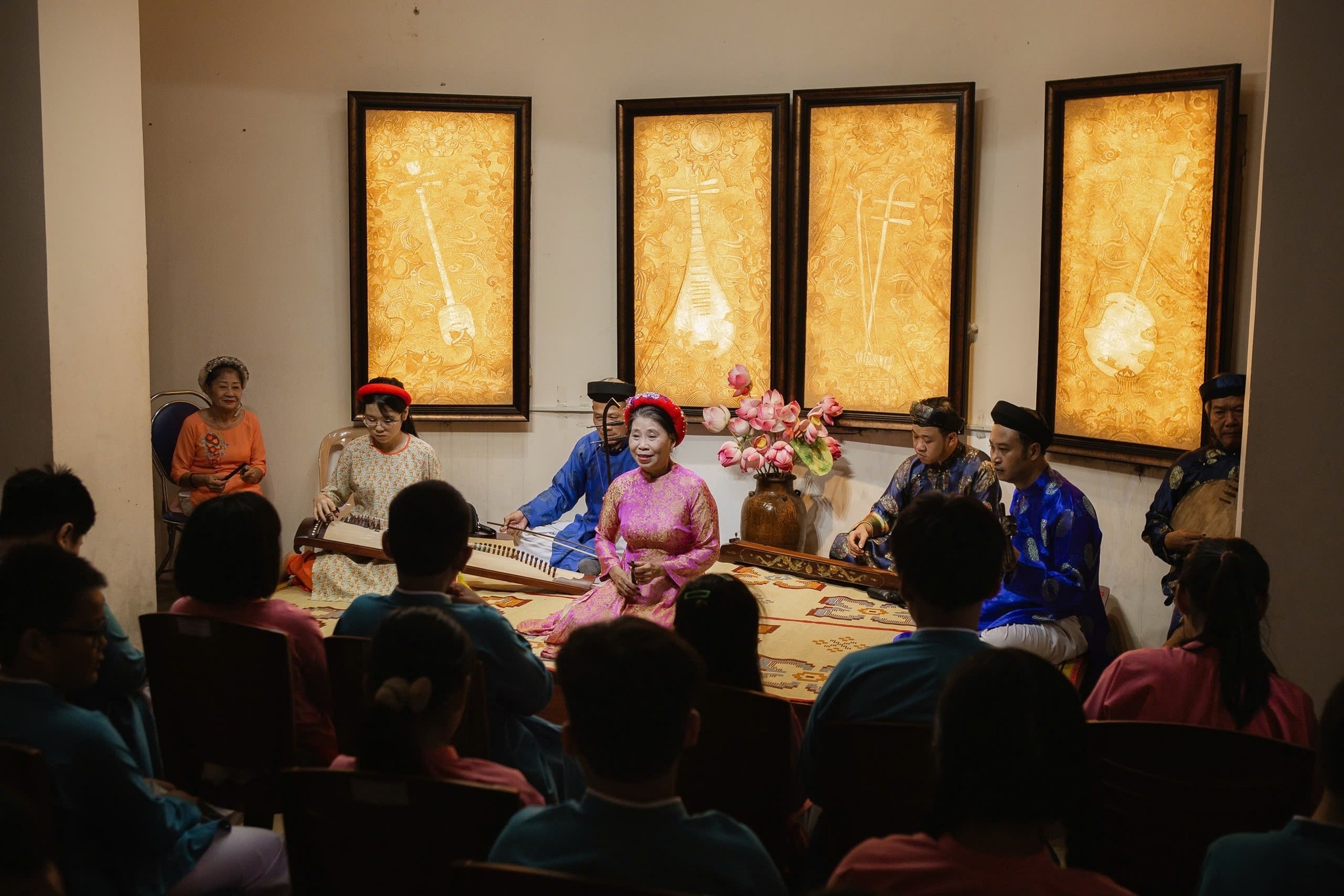
Hue chamber music performance at 25 Le Loi, Hue city
