= 2019 VTV Awards =

Vietnamese Awards held in 2019

- Date: September 7, 2019
- Site: Studio S14, VTV Headquarters, Ngọc Khánh Ward, Ba Đình District, Hanoi
- Hosted by: Thành Trung, Ngô Kiến Huy (with Hồng Nhung, Mai Ngọc, Nguyên Khang at the opening), Minh Hà

Television coverage
- Network: VTV1
- Duration: 140 minutes

The 2019 VTV Awards (Vietnamese: Ấn tượng VTV - Thách thức 2019) is a ceremony honouring the outstanding achievement in television on the Vietnam Television (VTV) network from August 2018 to July 2019. It took place on September 7, 2019 in Hanoi and hosted by Thành Trung, Ngô Kiến Huy & Minh Hà.

== Winners and nominees ==
(Winners denoted in bold)

Impressive Drama
**Về nhà đi con** **(Come Home, My Dear)**; Quỳnh búp bê (Quỳnh the Doll); Chạy trốn thanh xuân (Run Away from Youth); Những cô gái trong thành phố (Girls in the City); Cảnh sát hình sự: Mê cung (Criminal Police: The Labyrinth)
| Impressive Actor | Impressive Actress |
| **Trung Anh** - **Về nhà đi con** **(Come Home, My Dear)**; Huỳnh Anh - Chạy trốn thanh xuân (Run Away from Youth); Doãn Quốc Đam - Quỳnh búp bê (Quỳnh the Doll), Cảnh sát hình sự: Mê cung (Criminal Police: The Labyrinth); Hồng Đăng - Cảnh sát hình sự: Mê cung (Criminal Police: The Labyrinth); Quốc Trường - Về nhà đi con (Come Home, My Dear) | **Bảo Thanh** - **Về nhà đi con** **(Come Home, My Dear)**; Ninh Dương Lan Ngọc - Mối tình đầu của tôi (My Very First Love); Thu Quỳnh - Quỳnh búp bê (Quỳnh the Doll), Về nhà đi con (Come Home, My Dear); Thanh Hương - Quỳnh búp bê (Quỳnh the Doll), Nàng dâu order (Romantic Wife); Bảo Hân - Về nhà đi con (Come Home, My Dear) |
| Impressive TV Presenter | Impressive Singer |
| **Thành Trung**; Mai Ngọc; Ngô Kiến Huy; Hồng Nhung; Nguyên Khang | **Đông Nhi**; Mỹ Tâm; Lê Cát Trọng Lý; Đen Vâu; Noo Phước Thịnh |
Impressive Topical Image
**The 2019 USA-North Korea Summit**; Image from reportage series of 'Illegal protection activities in Long Biên market'; Moment of Trường Sa islands soldier's family reunion; The cheating trick of Minh Khai petrol station staff; The labour where cancer mother sacrifices herself for the life of her child
| Impressive Documentary | Impressive Cultural/Social Science/Educational Program |
| **VTV Đặc biệt: Đường về** **(VTV Special: Way Back)**; VTV Đặc biệt: Bạn có thấy điều tôi thấy? (VTV Special: Can You See What I See?); VTV Đặc biệt: Những cuộc gặp trong tù (VTV Special: Meetings In Prison); Thầy Cương (Mr. Cương); Những đứa trẻ hạnh phúc (Happy Kids) | **Ký ức vui vẻ** **(Happy Memories)**; Việc tử tế: Đi cùng ánh sáng (The Kindly Work: Along With the Light); Gala Thay đổi vì một trường học hạnh phúc ('Our Teachers Has Change' Gala: Change for a Happy School); Du ca 'Điều ước thứ 7': Ở nơi có nhiều mây ('The Saturday Wish' Travel Singing: At Where There Are Many Clouds); Điều ước thứ 7: Giấc mơ bóng đá (The Saturday Wish: Football Dream) |
| Figure of the Year | Program of the Year |
| **PhD. Professor Nguyễn Thanh Liêm**; H'Hen Niê; The teachers of An Lương semi-boarding primary school, Văn Chấn distr., Yên Bái; Nguyễn Thị Liên (The cancer mother gave birth to her son, Bình An); Start-up entrepreneur Vũ Duy Thức | **Giai điệu tự hào: Những người con của biển** **(The Proud Melodies: Children of the Sea)**; Chào 2019 (Hello 2019); Ngày trở về: Giong buồm đón gió (Return Day: Sailing Into the Wind); Quán thanh xuân (A Place For Our Youth); Hòa ca (Let's Harmonize) |

== Presenters/Awarders ==
| Order | Presenter/Awarder | Award |
|---|---|---|
| 1 | Tự Long, Lại Văn Sâm & eight children | Impressive TV Presenter |
| 2 | Giang Brothers | Impressive Cultural/Social Science/Educational Program |
| 3 | Huy Tuấn, Lê Cát Trọng Lý | Impressive Topical Image |
| 4 | Đỗ Thanh Hải, Nhã Phương | Impressive Actor |
| 4 | Đỗ Thanh Hải, Nhã Phương | Impressive Actress |
| 5 | Nguyễn Thước, Lan Hương | Impressive Documentary |
| 6 | Đỗ Hồng Quân | Impressive Singer |
| 7 | Phạm Hoàng Nam, Hồ Ngọc Hà | Impressive Drama |
| 8 | Trần Bình Minh (presented by Minh Hà & Ngô Kiến Huy) | Figure of the Year |
| 9 | Nguyễn Thị Thu Hiền (presented by Hoàng Dũng & Đỗ Mỹ Linh) | Program of the Year |

== Special performances ==
| Order | Artist | Performed |
|---|---|---|
| 1 | Dòng Thời Gian band | "Phút giây tỏa sáng" |
| 2 | Đinh Hương & Thanh Hương (from Trời sinh một cặp) | "Đón bình minh" |
| 3 | Hà Lê & Bùi Lan Hương (with traditional instruments by Nguyễn Quang Hưng & DJ Tùng Acoustic) | "Mưa hồng" (with áo dài show by fashion designer Đức Hùng) |
| 4 | Hồ Ngọc Hà | "Vẻ đẹp 4.0" |
| 5 | Thu Quỳnh, Bảo Hân, Lan Phương, Thúy Hà, Trung Anh, Hồng Diễm, Lương Thanh (w/special appearance of Hoàng Thùy Linh) | "Để Mị nói cho mà nghe" |
| 6 | Mỹ Linh & Choir of Young Hit Young Beat | "Ai cũng có ngày xưa" |
| 7 | Nhật Thủy | Mash-up: "Bài này chill phết", "Nhiều người ôm giấc mơ", "Xin lỗi anh quá phiền", "Cause I Love You", "Người hãy quên em đi" (Tribute Impressive Singer Nominees) |
| 8 | Bảo Thanh (with special appearance of Về nhà đi con cast: Hoàng Anh Vũ, Quốc Trường, Quỳnh Nga, Quang Anh, Tuấn Tú); Lâm Bảo Ngọc; Dương Hoàng Yến; Hoàng Thùy Linh | OST Medley: "Cảm ơn con nhé" (from Về nhà đi con) "Chờ ngày anh nhận ra em" (from Mối tình đầu của tôi) "Hạnh phúc trong em" (from Nàng dâu order) "Mê cung" (from Cảnh sát hình sự: Mê cung) |
| 9 | VTV Editors | "Rung chuông vàng" |
| 10 | Xuân Bắc & Đinh Tiến Dũng (from Hỏi xoáy đáp xoay) | Musical comedy skits Thách thức hình chữ nhật (Celebrating 49 Years of VTV performance) |
