= The Immortal (2018 film) =

- Film poster
- Vietnamese: Người Bất Tử
- Directed by: Victor Vu
- Written by: Kay Nguyen
- Produced by: Jason Ninh Cao; Thi Bich Ngoc Tran; Choi Yuno
- Starring: Quách Ngọc Ngoan; Ngọc Diệp; Jun Vu; Thanh Tu; François Négret; Lâm Vissay
- Cinematography: Nguyen K'Linh
- Edited by: Andy Nguyen
- Music by: Christopher Wong
- Production company: CJ Entertainment
- Release date: 26 October 2018
- Running time: 132 minutes
- Country: Vietnam
- Languages: Vietnamese; French

The Immortal (Vietnamese: Người Bất Tử) is a 2018 Vietnamese film directed by Victor Vu. The twelfth feature film by Vu, it tells the story of a man who has lived for three centuries after making himself immortal through dark magic. It premiered in the United States at the 11th Viet Film Fest in 2019 and won the Award for Best Cinematography for a Feature film.

== Synopsis ==
The film opens with scene An (Đinh Ngọc Diệp) constantly sleepwalking. Every time she wakes up she is in a distant place. Looking for solutions to these strange dreams, and at the same time finding a way to save the daughter who is slowly dying of cancer, An discovers the life of the immortal man (Quách Ngọc Ngoan) and the dark secrets.

From a gentle young man who is having a love affair with a beautiful singer named Liên (Jun Vũ), Hùng is assassinated and lost everything. On the day of his return, Hùng yearns to regain everything that was once his. Ambition and hatred lead Hùng to seek magic - charms, to fight death and to make those who harm him pay the price. However, "the more magical the spell, the more terrible the price", and the price that Hung has to pay is to become a slave of his own destiny.

== Cast ==
- Quách Ngọc Ngoan as Hung
- Ngọc Diệp as An
- Jun Vu as Lien
- Thanh Tu as Duyen
- François Négret as DeBray
- Lâm Vissay as Khang
- Trương Thế Vinh as Cuong
- Vũ Tuấn Việt as Damien
- Cường Seven as Loc
- Chiều Xuân as Madam Nhung
- Bùi Bài Bình as Ninh, the shaman
- Nguyễn Văn Báu as Đạo, the housekeeper
- Tu Trinh as Aunty Bau
- Kim Xuân as Psychic
- Phi Huyền Trang as Nga
- Duong Tan Giang as Doctor
- Tấn Thi as Doctor in the prison
- Huu Thach as Debray's Private Doctor
- Yến Nhi as Be Linh (An's Daughter)
- Lý Thanh Bình as An's Husband

== Reception ==
Reviews were mixed. One reviewer stated "the greatest value of The Immortal lies in the effort to pave the way, not the quality. From here, other directors can be more confident to exploit the unfamiliar fantasy genre. When a good movie comes out, one can recall that The Immortal started it all." They criticized "a messy script about details, lack of genre orientation, follows the overly and extremely weak formula in character building."

Another review stated that overall, The Immortal is "a very worth watching Vietnamese work, especially for those who are fans of Victor Vu", praising "elaborately invested cinematographic work, novel storylines and ghosts ... Although there is an incomplete ending, which can make many viewers disappointed and bewildered".

== Awards and nominations ==
Year	Award	Category	Recipient	Result
2019	11th Viet Film Fest	Best Feature	The Immortal	Nominated
2019	11th Viet Film Fest	Best Sound	The Immortal	Nominated
2019	11th Viet Film Fest	Best Cinematography	Nguyen K'Linh	Won
2019	11th Viet Film Fest	Best Actor	Quach Ngoc Ngoan	Nominated
2019	11th Viet Film Fest	Best Supporting Actor	Thanh Tu	Nominated
2019	Golden Kite Prize	Best Feature	The Immortal	Nominated
2019	Golden Kite Prize	Best Director	Victor Vu	Nominated
