= 2020 VTV Awards =

Vietnamese Awards held in 2020

- Date: September 5, 2020
- Site: Studio S14, VTV Headquarters, Ngọc Khánh Ward, Ba Đình District, Hanoi
- Hosted by: Thành Trung (Stage); Phí Linh (Digital/Backstage); Trần Ngọc (Red Carpet); Hồng Nhung, Việt Hoàng, Mai Ngọc, Bảo An, Khánh Vy (Opening)

Television coverage
- Network: VTV1, VTV Go
- Duration: 165 minutes

The 2020 VTV Awards (Vietnamese: Ấn tượng VTV 2020 - Dấu ấn 50 năm) is a ceremony honouring the outstanding achievement in television on the Vietnam Television (VTV) network from August 2019 to July 2020. Different from previous years, Voting Round 2 was opened 3 days after Round 1 closed. This year, the ceremony is also an occasion to celebrate 50 years of VTV. It took place on September 5, 2020 in Hanoi and hosted by Thành Trung, Phí Linh & Trần Ngọc.

For the first time, there are two versions of the ceremony to be aired: TV version on VTV1 channel and digital/backstage version on VTV Go mobile app.

== Winners and nominees ==
(Winners denoted in bold)

Impressive Drama
**Hoa hồng trên ngực trái** **(Roses on the Left Chest)**; Sinh tử (Life and Death); Tình yêu và tham vọng (Love and Ambition); Nhà trọ Balanha (Balanha Homestay); Những ngày không quên (Unforgettable Days)
Impressive Actor	Impressive Actress
**Xuân Nghị** - **Nhà trọ Balanha** **(Balanha Homestay)**; Thanh Sơn - Đừng bắt em phải quên (Don't Force Me to Forget), Tình yêu và tham vọng (Love and Ambition); Nhan Phúc Vinh - Tình yêu và tham vọng (Love and Ambition); Mạnh Trường - Sinh tử (Life and Death), Tình yêu và tham vọng (Love and Ambition); Việt Anh - Sinh tử (Life and Death)	**Hồng Diễm** - **Hoa hồng trên ngực trái** **(Roses on the Left Chest)**; Quỳnh Kool - Đừng bắt em phải quên (Don't Force Me to Forget), Nhà trọ Balanha (Balanha Homestay); Diễm My - Tình yêu và tham vọng (Love and Ambition); Lã Thanh Huyền - Tình yêu và tham vọng (Love and Ambition); Phương Oanh - Cô gái nhà người ta (A Girl Somewhere), Những ngày không quên (Unforgettable Days), Lựa chọn số phận (Life Choice)
Impressive TV Presenter	Impressive Singer
**Việt Hoàng**; Bảo An; Mai Ngọc; Hồng Nhung; Trần Khánh Vy	**Hà Lê**; Hoàng Thùy Linh; Erik; Phan Mạnh Quỳnh; Đức Tuấn
Impressive Topical Image
**The miraculous moment in the heart of the pandemic in Đà Nẵng**; The image of welcoming Vietnamese citizens back from the center of Covid-19 pandemic - Wuhan; Vietnam national under-22 football team crowned champions of the 30th SEA Games; The White Blouse soldiers on the battle against the Corona virus; Large-scale deforestation in Kon Tum
Impressive Documentary	Impressive Cultural/Social Science/Educational Program
**VTV Đặc biệt: Giữa những quê hương** **(VTV Special: Among the Motherlands)**; Cuộc chiến chưa kết thúc (Lingering War); Ngôi nhà của Nguyên (Nguyên's Home); Người mẹ (The Mother); VTV Đặc biệt: Những chuyến tàu định mệnh (VTV Special: The Fateful Trains)	**Quán thanh xuân: Về nhà xem phim** **(A Place for Our Youth: Go Home for Film)**; IELTS FACE-OFF; Dám sống: Phạm Gia Vinh - Chinh phục giấc mơ vũ trụ (Dare to Live: Phạm Gia Vinh - To Conquer the Cosmic Dream); Talk Việt Nam: "Cảm ơn nhé Việt Nam" (Talk Vietnam: "Thank You, Vietnam"); Cất cánh: Thầy - trò và cuộc sống 4.0 (Taking-Off: Teacher, Student and Life 4.0)
Figure of the Year	Program of the Year
**Medical and physician team at Bạch Mai Hospital**; Doctor Nguyễn Trung Cấp [from Cất cánh: Món quà vô giá (Taking-Off: The Priceless Gift)]; Nguyễn Mạnh Hùng, Ph.D [from Cất cánh: Khó khăn nào cũng vượt qua (Taking-Off: Break Every Difficulty)]; Mrs. Đỗ Thị Mơ (83 years old woman with 2 consecutive years of application to leave poor households status); Mobile Ranger Team of Pù Mát National Park	**VTV Đặc biệt: Park Hang Seo - Những câu chuyện chưa kể** **(VTV Special: Park Hang-seo - Untold Stories)**; 100 ngày chống dịch Covid-19 (100 Days of Fighting Against Covid-19 Pandemic); Covid-19 - Kẻ thù vô hình (Covid-19: An Invisible Enemy); Gala Ngày trở về: Mẹ ơi con là người Việt Nam (Return Day Gala: Mom, I'm Vietnamese); Quê hương - Mùa đoàn tụ (Homeland in Season of Reunion)

== Presenters/Awarders ==
Order	Presenter/Awarder	Award
1	Kim Tiến & Thành Trung	Impressive TV Presenter
2	Nguyễn Thanh Lâm & Hoài Anh	Impressive Topical Image
3	Park Hang-seo	Figure of the Year
4	Trung Anh & Lan Hương 'Bông'	Impressive Actress
4	Trung Anh & Lan Hương 'Bông'	Impressive Actor
5	Trần Văn Thủy (presented by Tạ Bích Loan)	Impressive Documentary
6	Quốc Trung & Bảo Thanh	Impressive Singer
7	Dương Trung Quốc & Lại Văn Sâm	Impressive Cultural/Social Science/Educational Program
8	Nguyễn Khải Hưng & Đỗ Thanh Hải	Impressive Drama
9	Trần Bình Minh	Program of the Year

== Special performances ==
Order	Artist	Performed
1	Ngọt & 50 VTV Editors (with special appearance of Nàng dâu order cast: Trọng Trinh, Thanh Hương, Thanh Sơn, Lan Phương)	"Chuyển kênh"
2	Bùi Lan Hương & Đạt G with a special reenactment by Trọng Trinh & Trung Anh	"Ngày đầu tiên" with an act of the first VTV test broadcast
3	Tùng Dương & Mỹ Linh with the choir of VTV youth unionists	"Hòa nhịp con tim" (Nhà có nhiều cửa sổ OST)
4	Xuân Nghị, Công Dương, Trần Vân, Bích Ngọc & Quỳnh Kool (Nhà trọ Balanha main cast)	"VTV là nơi" (Nhà trọ Balanha OST - VTV version in '70s style)
5	Hà Lê	"Khám phá"
6	Quang Thắng, Xuân Bắc, Công Lý, Tự Long & Đỗ Duy Nam	Kitchen Gods comedy skits
7	Hà Lê, Phạm Anh Duy, Dương Hoàng Yến & Thu Hoài (from Trời sinh một cặp)	"Bật lên rực rỡ"
