= Anh trai "say hi" =

- Genre: Reality, musical
- Directed by: Vương Khang
- Presented by: Trấn Thành
- Opening theme: "The Stars" & "All Eyes On Us" by JustaTee
- Composer: JustaTee
- Country of origin: Vietnam
- Original language: Vietnamese
- No. of seasons: 2
- No. of episodes: 28

Production
- Executive producer: Bảo Thái
- Producer: VieON
- Running time: 112–373 minutes
- Production company: Vie Channel

Original release
- Network: HTV2 - Vie Channel; ON Vie Giải Trí; VieON
- Release: June 15 – September 14, 2024
- Release: September 20 – December 13, 2025

Related
- Call Me by Fire Vietnam Pretty Girls "Say Hi"

Anh trai “Say Hi” (lit. 'Hot Bros "Say Hi"'; abbreviated as ATSH, stylized with all capital letters) is a music reality TV show broadcast on HTV2 - Vie Channel, ON Vie Giải Trí, and the VieON app starting June 15, 2024. The program features 30 "brothers", who are male artists currently active in the arts.

== Format ==
Anh trai "say hi” features 30 young male artists, referred to as the “brothers.” The brothers in the program will undergo a process of self-improvement and upgrading through each round of competition for the chance to appear in the winning band lineup.

== Production history ==
=== Season 1 ===
On the Sóng 24 program aired on February 9, 2024, following the opening segment “Anh trai ‘say hi!’” featuring 16 male artists and the “Laviu” performance by 5 male singers, Vie Channel officially announced the launch of a new reality music TV show in 2024.

Further details about the program were revealed by the producer on March 14, 2024. According to the announcement, the program is scheduled to air in June 2024 and will be a music television program exclusively for male artists. As shared by the producer, this reality TV show features a completely new format, where young artists have the opportunity to refine and improve themselves to appear in a perfect lineup of singers, aiming to deliver high-quality music productions.

On April 9, 2024, Tran Thanh was announced as the host of Anh trai “say hi” on the program's official fan page. He will serve as a liaison to help viewers better understand the stories, passions, and aspirations of the artists participating in the program. Then, on April 15, 2024, JustaTee was announced as the official music director of the program – the person responsible for music production and overseeing professional matters to ensure that each group can fully showcase their talents and personalities and deliver outstanding performances. According to an announcement by the producer posted on the program's fan page on April 16, 2024, the program will be filmed on April 20 and 21, and the identities of the “brothers” will be revealed after filming.

On April 22, 2024, one day after filming, all 30 “brothers” participating in the program were officially announced. Explaining why the program has 30 “brothers,” a representative of the production company said that this is a purely Vietnamese program organized exclusively for 30 singers and rappers who are young, ambitious, and dream of bringing fame to their local culture.

The official meet-and-greet event for the program took place on the afternoon of June 5, 2024, with all 30 “brothers” in attendance. During this event, the producer announced that the program would air starting June 15, 2024. The producer also revealed that over 50 songs in the program are entirely new compositions, produced by music director JustaTee alongside over 20 musicians and music producers. That same evening, the official music video for the show, titled “The Stars,” was released, featuring all 30 “brothers” participating in the first season.

=== Season 2 ===
On August 8, 2025, production company Vie Channel unexpectedly posted images hinting at an event for the show Anh trai say hi, scheduled to take place on August 12, but without revealing any specific details about the event. By August 11, the 30 “brothers” participating in Season 2 were indirectly introduced through silhouettes and illustrations depicting each person, and at midnight that same day, the producer officially announced Season 2 of the program with a new theme called Core Force. On August 12, the entire cast participating in Season 2 was officially announced.

The program's official meet-and-greet took place on the afternoon of September 17, 2025, with the participation of 29 brothers participating in the program (Ngô Kiến Huy was absent due to personal commitments). Similar to the first season, all songs in the program are entirely new compositions, produced by music director Justa Tee alongside over 20 musicians and music producers.

== Broadcast ==
The first episode of Anh trai “say hi” aired at 8:00 p.m. on June 15, 2024. The program airs every Saturday evening on HTV2 - Vie Channel, ON Vie Entertainment, and the VieON app, and is also broadcast on the official YouTube channel of the producer, Vie Channel.

On the morning of July 20, 2024, the producer announced that episode 6 of the first season, originally scheduled to air that evening, would be postponed to a later date to make room for programs airing before and during the national mourning period for General Secretary Nguyen Phu Trong. On August 14, 2024, the producer announced that episodes 9 and 10 would be broadcast at 8:00 p.m. on consecutive days—Saturday, August 17, and Sunday, August 18, 2024.

In Season 2, the program shifted to airing at 7:00 PM on Saturdays from episodes 1 to 3. Episode 4 of Season 2 aired at 8:00 PM starting October 11, 2025.

== Season overview ==
Tổng quan các mùa
Season	Number of "Bros"	Episodes	Originally released	
Season	Number of "Bros"	Episodes	First released	Last released
1	30	14	June 15, 2024	September 14, 2024
2	30	14	September 20, 2025	December 13, 2025

== Reception ==
=== Season 1 ===
From the moment it was announced, the show attracted widespread audience interest. Many viewers expressed their anticipation for the announcement of the “brothers” on the show's fan page.

Another program, Call Me by Fire, which has a similar format and aired at the same time as this program, sparked debate among many viewers. According to Tuổi Trẻ, what viewers care about most for a music entertainment program is “being able to watch,” not “being forced to watch.” According to Phu Nu So, many viewers believe that the producers are deliberately creating a new rivalry in the summer of 2024.

As soon as the full list of artists participating in the program was announced, the program immediately attracted attention on social media and forums. According to the SocialTrend Ranking for the Music category for the week of April 16 to 24, 2024, the program ranked 4th in the top 10 with 36,740 discussions and 765,480 interactions on social media. In the same ranking, for the week of April 30 to May 6, the program ranked second with over 72,000 discussions. Additionally, according to Kompa's records, the program topped the rankings for the most-interacted reality TV show in April with 4.5 million discussions and interactions on social media.

The program has also been recognized as evidence of the development of the cultural industry with attractive programs that have a significant social impact. Prime Minister Pham Minh Chinh, in a speech at a conference, mentioned the success of the two concerts Anh trai “say hi” and Anh trai vượt ngàn chông gai, and praised the creativity of the young Vietnamese people who participated: "Through these two concerts, we have seen that we have the stature, intelligence, and creativity to develop the cultural and entertainment industries. We have a culture rich in national identity, with internal strength, tradition, and potential to enhance cultural enjoyment..."

== Controversy ==
=== Season 1 ===
==== Announcement of Trấn Thành as the host ====
When the show announced Tran Thanh as its official host, the online community had mixed reactions. Many audience comments expressed concern that Tran Thanh would also take on the role of judge or guest, as he had done in some previous shows. Some opinions suggested that Tran Thanh should restrain his emotions and limit his “impromptu singing” as a host to avoid unnecessary controversy. Conversely, many viewers believed that his eloquence and wit would be an attractive factor for the show.

==== Launch timing ====
“Say Hi” began announcing the first details on the program Sóng 24, and subsequently revealed further information shortly thereafter, when the program Chị đẹp đạp gió rẽ sóng 2023 had just ended, and the program Anh trai vượt ngàn chông gai 2024 was beginning production. This has raised questions about whether the program is leveraging the popularity of the two shows licensed from China to boost its appeal at launch.

==== Plagiarism issues ====
The program has been embroiled in a number of controversies over plagiarizing the ideas and formats of other programs. In episode 2 of the first season, Anh Tu's performance “Waves Breaking the Shore” was accused of copying the stage performance “The Whale Incarnate of the Lonely Island” from China's 2021 program “Creative Enterprise.” Another performance titled “Nỗi đau ngây dại” by the group Đức Phúc was also accused of having choreography similar to “Shangri-La” by the group The Boyz in the program Road to Kingdom.

==== Using a map that omits the Paracel and Spratly Islands ====
Episode 2 of the program was criticized by many viewers for using a sketch of a map of Vietnam in a short scene that omitted the Paracel and Spratly Islands. Although it was later removed from the YouTube broadcast, the image was widely circulated on social media, with many viewers expressing outrage. According to Phụ nữ, many opinions expressed concern about the producer's caution regarding issues related to national sovereignty. On the evening of July 3, Ho Chi Minh City Television issued an official response stating that this was a misunderstanding. According to the production company's explanation, the image of the globe in the video “was only symbolic to express the production team's idea”; “the scene showing the rotating globe covered by clouds happened very quickly,” “at a very small scale,” and “did not fully display the attributes of a map.”

==== Myra Tran's Performance Cut ====
In July 2024, Episode 7 (Season 1) of the show cut the guest performance of singer Myra Tran, the winner of The X Factor Vietnam 2016, after netizens discovered she performed at the funeral of former South Vietnamese pilot Ly Tong, who was accused of hijacking a Vietnam Airlines plane to drop anti-communist leaflets in 1992, as well as other anti-communist leaflet distribution incidents in Cuba, China, and North Korea. In August 2024, Myra Tran officially posted an apology to the audience, affirming that she had not engaged in any actions harmful to national security in Vietnam.

== Spinoff ==
At the finale of the first season of "Anh trai “say hi”", the producer announced that there would be a female version of the show called Em xinh "say hi". The show officially aired on May 31, 2025.

== See also ==
- Em xinh "say hi"
