= Rap Việt =

Vietnamese TV reality series

- Genre: Reality show
- Created by: Workpoint TV
- Based on: The Rapper of Workpoint TV
- Developed by: Lê Minh Trị
- Directed by: Vương Khang; Đỗ Duy Đức
- Creative directors: Touliver (1–2); JustaTee (3–4)
- Presented by: Trấn Thành
- Judges: List
- Narrated by: Ôn Vĩnh Quang
- Opening theme: "Đây là Rap Việt" (season 1) "Đây là Rap Việt 2" (season 2) "We Go Hard" (season 3) "No Limit" (season 4)
- Ending theme: "Chúng ta đều là người chiến thắng" (season 1) "Chúng ta là chiến binh Rap Việt" (season 2) "Vẫn Lit - Hội không nón" (season 3) "Quit vẫn Lit" (season 4)
- Country of origin: Vietnam
- Original language: Vietnamese
- No. of seasons: 4
- No. of episodes: 63

Production
- Executive producer: Bùi Hữu Đức
- Producers: Lê Minh Trị; Vũ Bình Nguyên; Quỳnh Như
- Production location: Zoom Media
- Running time: 130 minutes
- Production companies: Ho Chi Minh City Radio and Television; DatVietVAC

Original release
- Network: HTV2 - Vie Channel; ON Vie Giải Trí; VieON
- Release: August 1, 2020 – December 14, 2024

Related
- The Rapper Thailand; Thế giới Rap - King of Rap; Rock Việt

Rap Việt is a rap talent search television show produced by Vie Channel (part of DatVietVAC), based on the show The Rapper by Workpoint TV. The program is broadcast on HTV2 - Vie Channel, Vie Giải Trí, and the VieON app at 8:00 PM every Saturday, starting from August 1, 2020.

== Format ==
Coaches, judges, and the MC are present throughout the entire competition. Additionally, contestants receive special assistance from backup singers, music producers, and dance troupes, along with several singers and songwriters invited by the coaches or the contestants themselves.

Over the course of each season, the show has updated the format of its competition rounds. Here is the show's format as of Season 4.

=== Conquest round ===
Contestants will choose an idea or product from popular culture to remake with their own rap lyrics in an effort to win over the coaches. Coaches select potential contestants who fit their team by activating the pedal in front of their hot seat. At the end of the performance, the studio audience will vote; a coach's selection is only valid if the contestant receives at least 50% of the audience vote.

In the event that two or more coaches choose the same contestant, the judges will decide which coach's team the contestant should join based on who they feel is the best fit. If the judges cannot agree on which team the contestant should be assigned to, the contestant will have the final say.

All four coaches will have three special privileges as follows:

- Golden Hat: When a coach feels particularly fond of a certain contestant and does not want the decision to rest with the judges, they can throw the golden hat placed next to their chair onto the stage. If only one coach throws the golden hat, the contestant joins that coach's team. If two or more coaches successfully use this right, the contestant makes the final decision. Each coach is only allowed to use this privilege once; if used successfully, the golden hat power can no longer be used.
- Golden Lock: Each coach has one "Golden Lock" privilege, which only takes effect once they have pressed their selection button. Only the coach who pulls the lever the fastest can use the golden lock to place it on a coach they perceive as a "threat." The coach wearing the golden lock is not allowed to argue or use their golden hat to win the contestant.
- First Choice: Each coach has one "First Choice" privilege to pick a contestant for their team before the audition round, during which all four coaches get to see the contestant's performance from the casting round. The coaches do not know each other's choices, and the contestant does not know which coach has made them their first choice. When a coach is announced to have used their "First Choice" privilege, the golden hat and golden lock powers will have no effect on that contestant.

At the end of the audition round, the coaches must form a team of 8 contestants to move on to the next stage.

=== The Battle Rounds ===
The coaches pair up the contestants in their team (excluding those who have already performed in that round and were saved by that coach) into head-to-head matchups. Each pair will co-write and perform a single act based on a theme provided by their coach.

After the face-off performance, the judges will select the winner to move on to the next round. If the judges cannot reach a consensus, the final decision rests with the coach. While this can sometimes spark controversy, it is based on the judges' professional and impartial assessment to ensure a fair result for everyone.

The losing contestants will compete in a redemption round, where each contestant chooses one of two pre-prepared backing tracks to compose and perform on the spot based on a theme provided by the coach. From this round, the coach will select only one contestant to move forward. The Golden Hat privilege continues to be applied as it was in the previous round to save a losing contestant from another team (it cannot be used to save a contestant from one's own team). At the end of the battle rounds, each coach will have 6 contestants remaining: 5 who moved on and one who was saved by another coach using the gold hat.

=== Breakthrough round ===
The remaining 24 contestants are divided into 6 groups, with each group consisting of 4 contestants from 4 different teams. The contestants compose and perform their own pieces based on a given theme. Once all four contestants in a group have finished their performances, the judges and coaches vote to determine the winner of that group (coaches are not allowed to vote for contestants from their own team)..

At the end of all 6 groups, each judge will use their golden hat to save one eliminated contestant from any of the groups whom they believe deserves to move on to the Final round. Thus, after this round, a total of 9 contestants (the 6 winners from the 6 groups and 3 contestants saved by the judges' golden hats) will advance to the Finals.

Additionally, in Season 4, each coach and judge will receive a ballot to write down the name of one contestant they believe deserves to advance to the next round (coaches are not allowed to vote for their own contestants). Any contestant who receives two or more votes will move on to the Finals. In the event that the coaches and judges do not write down the same names (meaning each contestant only receives one vote), this spot will be forfeited, which means contestants who receive only one vote or no votes at all will be eliminated.

In the event that two or more contestants are tied with the highest number of votes, each will choose one of two beats (consisting of 8 bars) and perform on the spot based on a theme provided by the judges to determine the final winner.

=== Finals ===
The remaining 9 contestants will have to compete in the grand finale. Each contestant will compose and perform a solo on the first night, then collaborate with the coaches and judges on the second night.

The audience can vote for their favorite contestant to win through the VieON app. The final result is calculated based on the audience vote (60%) and the scores from the coaches and judges (40%). Coaches receive 1 vote when voting for their own contestant and 2 votes when voting for a contestant from another team. During the live gala awards night, the contestant with the highest score will be crowned the winner and receive prizes including a gold trophy with the show's logo, cash, and other valuable items.

== Broadcast ==
Each episode of the show airs every Saturday at 8:00 PM on HTV2 - Vie Channel, VTVCab 1, Vie Giải Trí, and the VieON app, and at 9:30 PM the same day on the HTV2 - Vie Channel YouTube channel. The live finale and awards ceremony will be broadcast starting at 8:00 PM across all platforms.

== Seasonal overview ==
Season	Episodes	Originally released	
Season	Episodes	First released	Last released
1	16	August 1, 2020	November 14, 2020
2	16	October 16, 2021	January 26, 2022
3	16	May 27, 2023	September 9, 2023
4	15	September 21, 2024	December 14, 2024

== Coaches and judges ==
=== Coaches ===
Coach	Season			
Coach	1	2	3	4
Wowy	✔️	✔️	✖	✖
Karik	✔️	✔️	✖	✔️
Suboi	✔️	✖	✖	✔️
Binz	✔️	✔️	✖	✖
Rhymastic	✖	✔️	✖	✖
B Ray	✖	✖	✔️	✔️
BigDaddy	✖	✖	✔️	✔️
Andree Right Hand	✖	✖	✔️	✖
Thái VG	✖	✖	✔️	✖

=== Judges ===
Judge	Season			
Judge	1	2	3	4
Rhymastic	✔️	✖	✖	✖
JustaTee	✔️	✔️	✔️	✔️
LK	✖	✔️	✖	✖
Karik	✖	✖	✔️	✖
Suboi	✖	✖	✔️	✖
Thái VG	✖	✖	✖	✔️

== Reception ==
Season 1

At the time of its launch, many rap fans voiced their disapproval upon hearing that Tran Thanh would be hosting the show. Many expressed their opinions, arguing that the artist did not seem like a good fit for this genre. A large number of rap enthusiasts believed that the show should have invited someone with expertise, seniority, or a deep understanding of rap. However, others pointed out that Tran Thanh has hosted in many different fields and has always delivered solid performances. Furthermore, his name alone brought a significant boost to the show's viewership ratings.

While netizens were busy in a "keyboard war" debating whether Tran Thanh was the right fit, singer Wowy—one of the show's four coaches—unexpectedly spoke up to defend the MC while replying to a viewer's comment. Wowy argued that Tran Thanh's role as MC makes perfect sense. He pointed out that bringing in another rap expert would make the show too rigid, whereas Tran Thanh has the ability to balance things out and connect with people, helping the contestants feel comfortable enough to open up.

Despite this, right from the very first episodes, the show garnered massive attention from a wide audience, ranging from rap enthusiasts to the general online community. Episode 2 alone (aired on August 8, 2020) drew over 500,000 concurrent viewers during its YouTube premiere—a record-breaking figure in Vietnam at the time. Shortly after, the first two episodes claimed the top two spots on YouTube's trending list in Vietnam. It did not stop there, as Episode 3 went on to shatter Episode 2's record with over 700,000 live premiere viewers. Every episode has over 10 million views and has trended in several Asian countries.

However, throughout the broadcast, there were times when Tran Thanh became the focus of audience criticism for crying too often and too much, with some even accusing him of "acting" or being "fake," which eventually forced the male MC to speak out and explain himself.

After the first night of the finals, the audience was left disappointed by the contestants' lack of a breakthrough, feeling the event felt more like a tribute performance than a final competition. As for the grand finale and awards ceremony, several avoidable mistakes occurred. These included rapper Andree performing a song with sensitive lyrics that were inappropriate for the large number of young viewers watching the show; the constant and heavy rotation of advertisements throughout the broadcast; Trấn Thành's long-winded hosting style; and a lackluster, rushed crowning of the winner that failed to create a memorable highlight. Also during the finale, MC Trấn Thành announced that the show reached 1.1 million concurrent viewers, setting a "current world record" for the highest number of concurrent viewers (CCU) on YouTube for a television program. However, this information has been confirmed to be inaccurate.

The show's impact goes far beyond just viewership ratings. Thanks to the massive appeal of Rap Viet, rap music has gained much broader public recognition, shifting audience musical tastes and helping to break down previous stigmas surrounding the genre.

Season 2

Season 2 showed a decline for Rap Viet compared to Season 1. Many strong contestants like Pjpo and Obito were eliminated early. On top of that, there's a pretty intense rumor that Sol7 actually tore up the winner's contract, forcing them to choose Seachains as the champion instead.

Season 3

Although it followed the success of Season 2, it still left a lot of frustration. Specifically in episode 2, three rappers became major talking points. First was Rhyder singing too much yet still making it to the finals; second was Dubbie, whose rap lyric "Always bowing before the Uncle named Ho" caused a lot of outrage; and finally Megashock, who performed very well but was eliminated with only 48% of the vote despite Thai VG's selection. Additionally, there's Andree Right Hand's coaching ability; despite having strong contestants like SMO, Minh Lai, and Hydra, they seemed to get worse under his guidance. A prime example was Andree putting Wxrdie into Minh Lai's track, which made many people feel like Minh Lai was just a backup for Wxrdie.

Season 4

This has been the most drama-filled season out of all four, with so many controversies breaking out. First off, there's the feeling that Shayda did not deserve to move forward; she sang way too much yet still landed two golden hats and a First Choice. Then in the second round, she had more singing parts than her opponent YP, but she still advanced even though YP rapped more. On top of that, Rap Viet is overusing scripted drama—from letting Gnob fail the first round while moving V High through, to Bray throwing a golden hat for Tieu Minh Phung. It all just proves that Rap Viet is leaning way too hard on a script.

== Awards and nominations ==
Year	Award	Category	Nomination	Result	Notes
2020	Giải Mai Vàng	Chương trình truyền hình	Rap Việt	Nominated	
2020	Giải Mai Vàng	Người dẫn chương trình	Trấn Thành	Nominated	
2020	WeChoice Awards	TV Show của năm	Rap Việt	Won	
2021	Giải thưởng Âm nhạc Cống hiến	Nhà sản xuất của năm	Hoàng Touliver	Won	
2021	Giải thưởng Âm nhạc Cống hiến	Nghệ sĩ mới của năm	DC	Won	
2021	Giải thưởng Âm nhạc Cống hiến	Chuỗi chương trình của năm	Rap Việt	Won	
2023	Giải Mai Vàng	Chương trình trên các nền tảng số và truyền hình	Rap Việt	Nominated	
2023	Giải Mai Vàng	Người dẫn chương trình	Trấn Thành	Nominated	
2023	WeChoice Awards	TV Show của năm	Rap Việt	Won	

== Side activities ==
=== All-Star Concert 2021 ===
The Rap Việt All-Star Concert is a live concert featuring the show's coaches, judges, and contestants, serving as a gift of gratitude to the audience. The performance was originally scheduled for January 30, 2021, at the Saigon Exhibition and Convention Center (SECC) in District 7, Ho Chi Minh City, with an expected capacity of 10,000 people, but it was postponed to April 10, 2021, due to the impact of the COVID-19 pandemic.

The event was broadcast on HTV2 - Vie Channel, VTVCab 1 - Vie Giải Trí, and the VieON app at 8:00 PM on May 22 and 29, and at 9:00 PM on June 6, 2021. It was also released on the HTV2 - Vie Channel YouTube channel at 8:00 PM on June 12 and 19, 2021.

=== All-Star Concert 2023 ===
On the evening of August 12, 2023, the show's producers announced the Rap Viet All-Star Concert 2023. This is the second concert for the Rap Viet program following the success of the first one in 2021. The concert was held on October 7, 2023, at the Saigon Exhibition and Convention Center (SECC) in District 7, Ho Chi Minh City, just a few weeks after the Season 3 finale and awards night. According to the organizers, this concert will be just as impressive as the first successful concert held two years ago.

The event featured over 200 artists and more than 40 performances by the judges, coaches, and contestants of Rap Viet, along with several guest artists, including Chi Pu. The event was rebroadcast at 8:00 PM on VieON and 9:00 PM on YouTube on October 28, November 11, and November 18, 2023.
