= Em xinh "say hi" =

2025 Vietnamese television series

- Genre: Reality television Music television
- Directed by: Vương Khang
- Presented by: Trấn Thành
- Opening theme: "The Real Aura" by JustaTee
- Composer: JustaTee (Note: In the show, he took the stage name Jessica Thanh Tú.)
- Country of origin: Vietnam
- Original language: Vietnamese
- No. of seasons: 1
- No. of episodes: 14

Production
- Executive producer: Bảo Thái
- Producer: VieON
- Running time: 148–353 mins
- Production company: Vie Channel

Original release
- Network: HTV2 - Vie Channel; ON Vie Giải Trí; VieON
- Release: May 31 – August 23, 2025

Em xinh "say hi" (lit. 'Pretty Girls "Say Hi"'; abbreviated as EXSH, stylized with all capital letters) is a music reality television show broadcast on HTV2 - Vie Channel, ON Vie Giải Trí and VieON since May 31, 2025. The program features 30 "girls", who are female artists currently active in the arts.

== Format ==
Similar to the male counterpart Anh trai "say hi", Em xinh "say hi" includes female artists who are active in the art field (called "em xinh"). According to the producer, not simply a reality music program, Em xinh "say hi" is positioned as the journey of a new generation of Vietnamese female idols ready to conquer limits, transform their image but still maintain the core values of Vietnamese women. The program wants to aim for "Real Aura" (taken from the term "aura" commonly used in Kpop, referring to the charisma, temperament and aura of an artist), with the implication of shining in any version she wants.

Each "em xinh" will have to go through a journey of creating music, practicing choreography, breaking through limits to move towards a version of themselves with all five elements: presence; magnetism, Identity, adaptability, and influence and talent.

== Production history ==
At the finale of the show Anh trai "say hi" on September 14, 2024, after the remake of the show's theme song "The Stars" with the participation of five female artists Pháo, Juky San, Liz Kim Cương, 52Hz and Mỹ Mỹ, producer Vie Channel officially announced the launch of the female version of the show called Em xinh "say hi". At the 4th concert of Anh trai "say hi" (season 1) took place on December 9, 2024, it was revealed that the show would air in April 2025. On March 19, 2025, the producers announced the show's new air date of May 31, 2025, one month later than expected.

On April 1, 2025, Trấn Thành was announced as the host of Em xinh "say hi" through the show's official social media. Like Anh trai "say hi", he will play a connecting role to help the audience better understand the stories, passions and ambitions of the artists participating in the show. On the same evening, JustaTee was also announced as the show's music director - the person responsible for music production, in charge of professional issues to ensure that the groups can fully express each person's talent and personality and bring outstanding performances. Other characters in the show's crew include stage director Vuong Khang and fashion director Kye Nguyen.

To gear for the launch of the show, a press conference were held at Thiso Mall, Ho Chi Minh City on the afternoon of May 14, 2025, with the appearance of 28 out of 30 artists participating in the show. Similar to the previous male counterpart, all of the songs would be newly made, with more than 20 musicians and music producers in charge. The teaser for the show's theme song, "The Real Aura", was released on the same day, with the official music video was released on May 28.

== Broadcast ==
The first episode of Em xinh "say hi" aired on May 31, 2025. The program aired every Saturday night on HTV2 - Vie Channel, ON Vie Giải Trí, VieON application, and was also premiered on the official YouTube channel of the producer Vie Channel.

== Seasons ==
Season overview
Season	No. of Queens	Episodes	Originally released	
Season	No. of Queens	Episodes	First released	Last released
1	30	14	May 31, 2025	August 23, 2025

== Reception ==
Right from the moment it was announced, the program became the center of attention, not only because it was considered the female version of the program Anh trai "say hi", but also because of the audience's eagerness to wait for the moment when the 'em xinh' were revealed on the program's fanpage.

== Controversies and incidents ==
=== Copyright ===
On March 7, 2025, the producers officially announced the show's official logo.

The logo is stylized from the letters E and M intertwined, similar to the version of Anh trai "say hi" which is A and T. However, after its launch, the logo was accused of lacking creativity and plagiarism, specifically, an audience member realized that the logo had been taken from the website Shutterstock - a website that provides photos, videos, sounds, vector graphics and creative resources create another, very popular in the graphic design industry. Many opinions say that using available templates is not wrong because using the "Royalty Free" resource on this site is legal and does not violate copyright, but once it has been established as a brand, the program needs to invest in its identity as well as contact the original author if it wants to reuse the logo to ensure exclusivity.

After the controversy, at the 5th concert of Anh trai "say hi" (season 1) held on March 21, 2025, the producer officially announced the new logo, replacing the controversial old logo. The logo is made up of five pieces, representing diamonds cut from light and is interwoven with the letters E and M. However, besides the compliments about the logo and the program's criteria, a group of audiences said that the program's logo idea is similar to the Vietnamese version of Sisters Who Make Waves. But many other audiences said that if that is called plagiarism, it is not correct, because the logo of Sisters Who Make Waves is inspired by Bát Tràng ceramic material. Meanwhile, the logo of Em xinh "say hi" is inspired by diamonds, with sharp pieces representing different angles of a woman.

=== Concert Night incident ===
On the evening of September 13, 2025, after the opening of the first concert, the area behind the scaffolding near the stage suddenly caught fire, suspected to be caused by fireworks. The small fire was quickly extinguished, few spectators noticed because the incident was short and in a hidden location. The organizers handled the situation promptly so the program continued as usual.

However, at the second show in Hanoi on October 11, the incident became more serious when some fireworks were shot into the audience's standing position instead of up into the sky, as the show entered its finale. Although it was not clear whether any injuries were recorded at the time, many audiences expressed concern as this was not the first time a fireworks incident had occurred during the producer's performances. In an announcement on the morning of October 12, the show's production unit apologized to the audience who had an "incomplete experience". In addition, some performances in the show also encountered sound problems, especially the solo performance of Phương Mỹ Chi which was mostly muted.

== Awards and nominations ==
Year	Award	Category	Nomination	Result
2025	L'Officiel Beauty Choice Awards	Best Hair Styling of the Year	Juky San ("Hourglass")	Nominated
2025	L'Officiel Beauty Choice Awards	Best Hair Styling of the Year	Mỹ Mỹ ("Đông Đảo Xinh Gái")	Won
2025	L'Officiel Beauty Choice Awards	Best Hair Styling of the Year	Quỳnh Anh Shyn (MV "The Real Aura")	Nominated
2025	L'Officiel Beauty Choice Awards	Best Makeup Look of the Year	Phương Ly (Dance Battle)	Nominated
2025	L'Officiel Beauty Choice Awards	Best Makeup Look of the Year	Bảo Anh ("Tadida")	Nominated
2025	L'Officiel Beauty Choice Awards	Best Beauty Look on Stage	"Cách (yêu đúng) điệu"	Won
2025	L'Officiel Beauty Choice Awards	Best Beauty Look on Stage	"Chẳng phải anh đâu"	Nominated
2025	L'Officiel Beauty Choice Awards	Best Beauty Look on Stage	"Gã săn cá"	Nominated
2025	L'Officiel Beauty Choice Awards	Best Beauty Look on Stage	"Hề"	Nominated
2025	Vietnam iContent Awards	Digital Phenomenon of the Year	Em xinh "say hi"	Nominated
2025	Yellow Mai Awards	Television program – digital platform	Em xinh "say hi"	Nominated
2025	Yellow Mai Awards	Female singer	Phương Mỹ Chi ("Ếch ngồi đáy giếng")	Nominated

== After the show ==
After the first season ended, a new music group called Edenia was formed in early February 2026, consisting of four members who emerged from the show: MaiQuinn, Hoàng Duyên, Đào Tử A1J, and Ánh Sáng AZA. Edenia released their debut song "Xắc Cái Nị" on February 14 of the same year.

The Best 5 of the show also unofficially released a song at the show's second concert, titled "Best of Luck".

== See also ==
- Anh trai "say hi"
