= List of awards and nomations received by Soobin Hoàng Sơn =

Soobin Hoàng Sơn awards and nominations
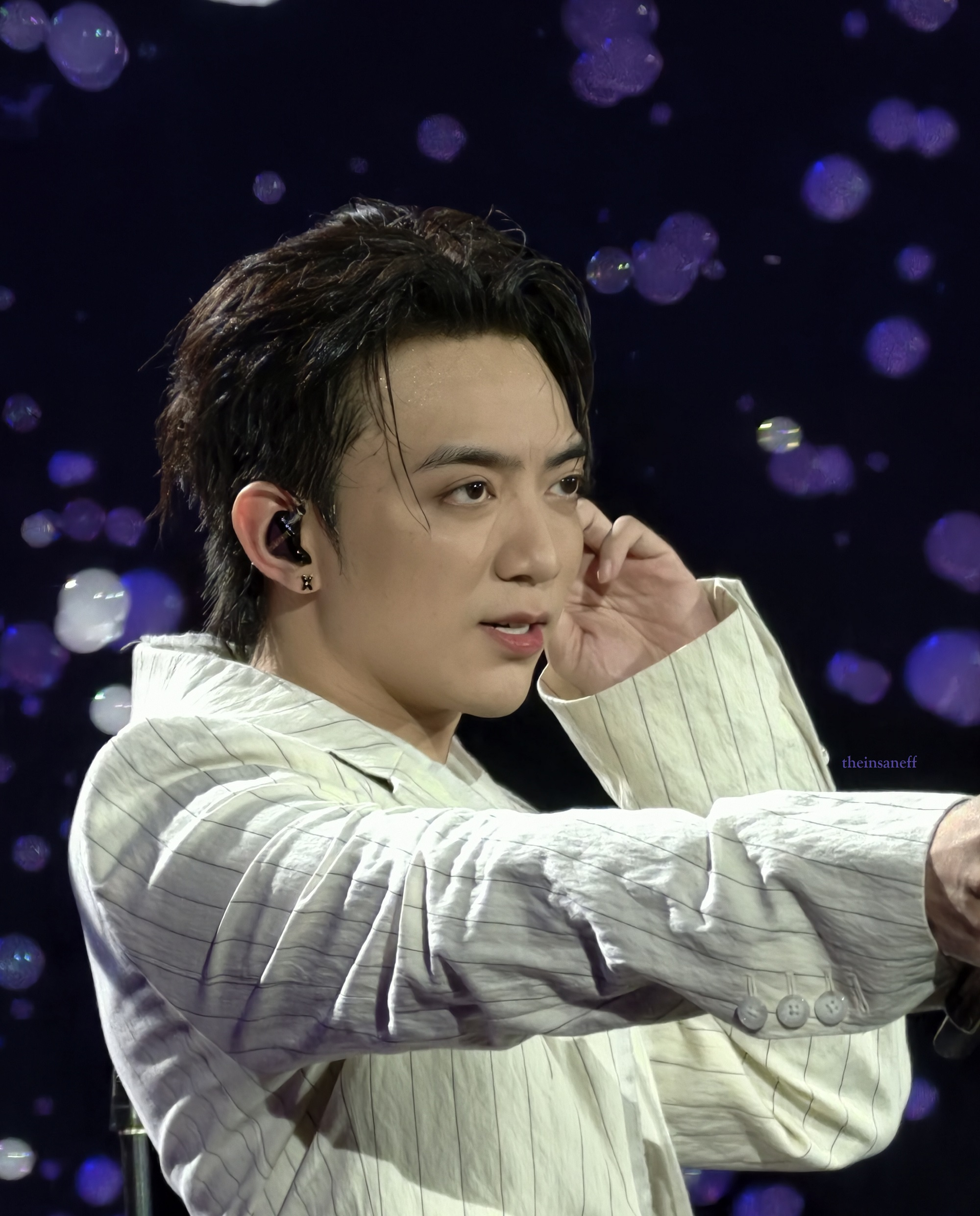
Awards and nominations
Award	Wins	Nominations
Elle Beauty Awards	1	3
Elle Style Awards	1	4
Mai Vàng Awards	4	10
Giải thưởng Âm nhạc Việt Nam	1	1
Giải Cống hiến	3	6
Gương mặt trẻ Việt Nam tiêu biểu	1	1
Harper's Bazaar Star Awards	1	1
Keeng Young Awards	4	7
Làn Sóng Xanh	9	23
Male Icon Awards	1	1
Ngôi sao của năm	0	1
Ngôi Sao Xanh	0	4
Producer's Inside Picks & Awards	1	2
Tinh hoa Việt	0	3
Vạn Xuân Awards	2	6
V Live Awards	0	5
WeChoice Awards	8	10
WeYoung	3	3
Zing Music Awards	3	22

Totals (Note: Certain award groups do not simply award one winner. They acknowledge several different recipients, have runners-up, and have third place. Since this is a specific recognition and is different from losing an award, runner-up mentions are considered wins in this award tally. For simplification and to avoid errors, each award in this list has been presumed to have had a prior nomination.)
- Wins: 43
- Nominations: 113

Vietnamese singer-songwriter Soobin Hoàng Sơn has earned numerous major titles and awards throughout his career. As of 2025, he has garnered a total of six nominations for the Dedication Music Awards, winning three of them.

== Awards and nominations ==
Giải thưởng và đề cử của Soobin Hoàng Sơn
Award	Year	Category	Nomination	Result	Ref.
Elle Beauty Awards	2022	Most Beautiful Man of the Year	Soobin	Nominated	
Elle Beauty Awards	2023	Most Beautiful Man of the Year	Soobin Hoàng Sơn	Nominated	
Elle Beauty Awards	2025	Most Beautiful Man of the Year	Soobin Hoàng Sơn	Won	
Elle Style Awards	2016	Most promising male stylist of the year	Soobin Hoàng Sơn	Nominated	
Elle Style Awards	2017	Most promising male stylist of the year	Soobin Hoàng Sơn	Nominated	
Elle Style Awards	2018	Most promising male stylist of the year	Soobin Hoàng Sơn	Won	
Elle Style Awards	2019	The most impressive cover of the year	Min & Soobin	Nominated	
Giải Mai Vàng	2017	Male pop singer	Soobin Hoàng Sơn	Nominated	
Giải Mai Vàng	2018	Male pop singer	Soobin Hoàng Sơn	Nominated	
Giải Mai Vàng	2019	Male singer	Soobin Hoàng Sơn	Nominated	
Giải Mai Vàng	2020	Male singer	Soobin Hoàng Sơn	Nominated	
Giải Mai Vàng	2024	Male singer – rapper	Soobin Hoàng Sơn	Won	
Giải Mai Vàng	2024	Music video	"Giá như"	Won	
Giải Mai Vàng	2024	Song	"Giá như"	Nominated	
Giải Mai Vàng	2025	Singer of the Year	Soobin	Won	
Giải Mai Vàng	2025	Music video	"Mục hạ vô nhân" (ft. Binz, Huỳnh Tú)	Won	
Giải Mai Vàng	2025	Song	"Mục hạ vô nhân" (ft. Binz, Huỳnh Tú)	Nominated	
Giải thưởng Âm nhạc Việt Nam	2025	Outstanding singer	Soobin Hoàng Sơn	Golden Sun	
Giải thưởng Cống hiến	2017	MV of the Year	"Phía sau một cô gái"	Nominated	
Giải thưởng Cống hiến	2017	Best New Artist	Soobin Hoàng Sơn	Nominated	
Giải thưởng Cống hiến	2018	MV of the Year	"Đi để trở về"	Nominated	
Giải thưởng Cống hiến	2025	Album of the Year	Bật nó lên	Won	
Giải thưởng Cống hiến	2025	MV of the Year	"Giá như"	Won	
Giải thưởng Cống hiến	2025	Male Singer of the Year	Soobin	Won	
Gương mặt trẻ Việt Nam tiêu biểu	2024	Arts and culture	Soobin Hoàng Sơn	Won	
Harper's Bazaar Star Awards	2025	Male Singer of the Year	Soobin	Won	
Keeng Young Awards	2017	Pop	"Xin đừng lặng im"	Nominated	
Keeng Young Awards	2017	Song of the Year	"Xin đừng lặng im"	Won	
Keeng Young Awards	2017	MV of the Year	"Anh đã quen với cô đơn"	Nominated	
Keeng Young Awards	2017	Favorite Male Artist	Soobin Hoàng Sơn	Nominated	
Keeng Young Awards	2017	The most popular artist on Imuzik	Soobin Hoàng Sơn	Won	
Keeng Young Awards	2017	Best Artist	Soobin Hoàng Sơn	Won	
Keeng Young Awards	2018	Favorite Male Artist	Soobin Hoàng Sơn	Won	
Làn Sóng Xanh	2016	Most Promising Face (Male)	Soobin Hoàng Sơn	Won	
Làn Sóng Xanh	2016	Viral hit	"Phía sau một cô gái"	Nominated	
Làn Sóng Xanh	2017	Top 5 Most Popular Singers – Top Hit Chart	Soobin Hoàng Sơn	Won	
Làn Sóng Xanh	2018	Top 10 most popular singers	Soobin Hoàng Sơn	Won	
Làn Sóng Xanh	2018	Male Singer of the Year	Soobin Hoàng Sơn	Nominated	
Làn Sóng Xanh	2021	Top 10 favorite songs	"Tháng năm"	Won	
Làn Sóng Xanh	2021	Song of the year	"Tháng năm"	Nominated	
Làn Sóng Xanh	2021	Music arrangement and production	"The Playah (Special Performance)" (ft. SlimV)	Won	
Làn Sóng Xanh	2021	Nam ca sĩ của năm	Soobin	Nominated	
Làn Sóng Xanh	2021	Breakout artist	Soobin	Nominated	
Làn Sóng Xanh	2021	Music video of the year	"BlackJack" (Double B)	Nominated	
Làn Sóng Xanh	2021	An excellent combination	"The Playah (Special Performance)" (ft. SlimV)	Nominated	
Làn Sóng Xanh	2024	Male singer/rapper of the Year	Soobin	Nominated	
Làn Sóng Xanh	2024	Ca sĩ đột phá	Soobin	Nominated	
Làn Sóng Xanh	2024	Breakout artist	Bật nó lên	Won	
Làn Sóng Xanh	2024	Best Group	"Trống cơm" (ft. Cường Seven, Tự Long, APJ, It's CHARLES., SlimV, Kriss Ngô, Touliver)	Won	
Làn Sóng Xanh	2024	Favorite male singer/rapper	Soobin	Nominated	
Làn Sóng Xanh	2025	Top 10 favorite songs	"Dancing In the Dark"	Won	
Làn Sóng Xanh	2025	A hit song from the movie soundtrack	"Tiến hay lùi" (ft. Bùi Công Nam)	Nominated	
Làn Sóng Xanh	2025	Best Group	"Mục hạ vô nhân" (ft. Binz, Huỳnh Tú)	Nominated	
Làn Sóng Xanh	2025	MV of the Year	"Mục hạ vô nhân" (ft. Binz, Huỳnh Tú)	Nominated	
Làn Sóng Xanh	2025	Male singer/rapper of the year	Soobin	Won	
Làn Sóng Xanh	2025	Favorite male singer/rapper	Soobin	Nominated	
Male Icon Awards	2024	Male icon of the year	Soobin	Won	
Ngôi sao của năm	2024	Talented male	Soobin Hoàng Sơn	Nominated	
Ngôi Sao Xanh	2025	Best music video	"Người Việt" (ft. Hà Lê, 16 Typh, Lil Wuyn, Kimlong)	Nominated	
Ngôi Sao Xanh	2025	Best music video	"Mục hạ vô nhân" (ft. Binz, Huỳnh Tú)	Nominated	
Ngôi Sao Xanh	2025	Most popular music video	"Người Việt" (ft. Hà Lê, 16 Typh, Lil Wuyn, Kimlong)	Nominated	
Ngôi Sao Xanh	2025	Most popular music video	"Mục hạ vô nhân" (ft. Binz, Huỳnh Tú)	Nominated	
Producer's Inside Picks & Awards	2025	Male singer of the Year	Bản thân	Won	
Producer's Inside Picks & Awards	2025	Song of the year	"Mục hạ vô nhân" (ft. Binz, Huỳnh Tú)	Nominated	
Tinh hoa Việt	2025	Song of the year	"Mục hạ vô nhân" (ft. Binz, Huỳnh Tú)	Nominated	
Tinh hoa Việt	2025	MV of the Year	"Mục hạ vô nhân" (ft. Binz, Huỳnh Tú)	Nominated	
Tinh hoa Việt	2025	Singer of the Year	Soobin	Nominated	
Vạn Xuân Awards	2024	Most popular brand ambassador	Soobin Hoàng Sơn	Won	
Vạn Xuân Awards	2024	Most impressive promotional music video of the year	"Tiến tới ước mơ" (ft. Rhymastic, SlimV)	Nominated	
Vạn Xuân Awards	2025	Most popular brand ambassador	Soobin Hoàng Sơn	Nominated	
Vạn Xuân Awards	2025	Most Impressive Advertising Ambassador of the Year	Soobin Hoàng Sơn	Nominated	
Vạn Xuân Awards	2025	Impressive music commercial of the Year	"Người Việt" (ft. Hà Lê, 16 Typh, Lil Wuyn, Kimlong)	Won	
Vạn Xuân Awards	2025	Impressive music commercial of the Year	"Em ơi, anh nhớ nhà (Đi để trở về 9)"	Nominated	
V Live Awards	2017	Best Male Artist	Soobin Hoàng Sơn	Nominated	
V Live Awards	2018	Artist of the Year	Soobin Hoàng Sơn	Nominated	
V Live Awards	2018	Top 3 V Heartbeat Rank	"Đẹp nhất là em"	Nominated	
V Live Awards	2019	Artist of the Year	Soobin Hoàng Sơn	Nominated	
V Live Awards	2019	V Fanship Community	Soobin Hoàng Sơn & SuSu Family	Nominated	
WeChoice Awards	2015	Inspirational playlist	"Daydreams"	Nominated	
WeChoice Awards	2016	Breakout singer	Soobin Hoàng Sơn	Won	
WeChoice Awards	2020	Music Video of the Year	"BlackJack" (Double B)	Nominated	
WeChoice Awards	2024	EP/Album of the Year	Bật nó lên	Won	
WeChoice Awards	2024	Impressive Performance	"Trống cơm" (ft. Tự Long, Cường Seven)	Won	
WeChoice Awards	2024	Breakout Artist/Rapper	Soobin	Won	
WeChoice Awards	2024	Inspirational figure	Soobin	Won	
WeChoice Awards	2024	BFF – Best Fandom Forever	Kingdom (FC Soobin)	Won	
WeChoice Awards	2025	Most popular Singer/Rapper	Soobin	Won	
WeChoice Awards	2025	Song of the year	"Mục hạ vô nhân" (ft. Binz, Huỳnh Tú)	Won	
WeYoung	2025	Best Fan Project	Dự án fan support chuỗi concert All-Rounder	Won	
WeYoung	2025	Best Fandom Forever	Kingdom (FC Soobin)	Won	
WeYoung	2025	Iconic Concert	Live concert All-Rounder	Won	
Zing Music Awards	2016	Best New Artist	Soobin Hoàng Sơn	Nominated	
Zing Music Awards	2016	Favorite male artist	Soobin Hoàng Sơn	Nominated	
Zing Music Awards	2016	Song with the most weeks at number one on the charts	"Phía sau một cô gái"	Won	
Zing Music Awards	2016	Favorite Pop/Rock Song	"Phía sau một cô gái"	Nominated	
Zing Music Awards	2016	Song of the Year	"Phía sau một cô gái"	Top 10	
Zing Music Awards	2017	Favorite Dance/Electronic Song	"Ngày mai em đi (Touliver Mix)" (ft. Lê Hiếu)	Won	
Zing Music Awards	2017	Favorite Dance/Electronic Song	"Vinh quang đang chờ ta" (ft. Rhymastic)	Top 20	
Zing Music Awards	2017	Favorite R&B/Soul song	"Anh đã quen với cô đơn"	Nominated	
Zing Music Awards	2017	Popular Pop/Ballad song	"Xin đừng lặng im"	Nominated	
Zing Music Awards	2017	Popular Pop/Ballad song	"Đi để trở về"	Top 20	
Zing Music Awards	2017	Favorite Rap/Hip hop song	"Nóng xệ mood" (ft. BigDaddy, Hạnh Sino)	Top 10	
Zing Music Awards	2017	Song of the year	"Xin đừng lặng im"	Nominated	
Zing Music Awards	2017	Song of the year	"Đi để trở về"	Top 10	
Zing Music Awards	2017	Music Video of the Year	"Xin đừng lặng im"	Top 20	
Zing Music Awards	2017	Music Video of the Year	"Đi để trở về"	Top 20	
Zing Music Awards	2017	Popular male singer	Soobin Hoàng Sơn	Nominated	
Zing Music Awards	2017	Artist of the Year	Soobin Hoàng Sơn	Won	
Zing Music Awards	2018	Favorite Dance/Electronic Song	"I Know You Know"	Nominated	
Zing Music Awards	2018	Favorite male artist	Soobin Hoàng Sơn	Nominated	
Zing Music Awards	2018	The most popular soundtrack song	"Yêu thương ngày đó"	Nominated	
Zing Music Awards	2019	Artist of the Year	Soobin Hoàng Sơn	Top 20	
Zing Music Awards	2019	Favorite male artist	Soobin Hoàng Sơn	Nominated	
