= List of awards and nominations received by Trấn Thành =

Awards and nominations by Trấn Thành
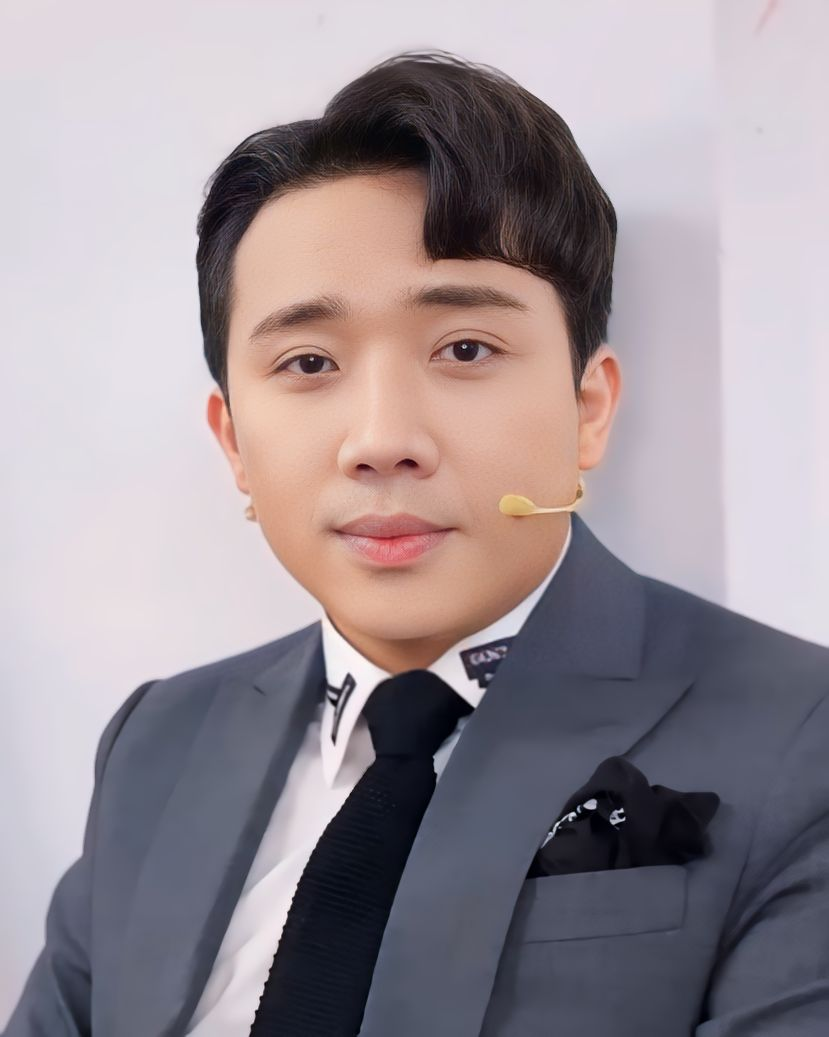
- Trấn Thành in 2019
Awards and nominations
| Award | Win | Nomination |
Total
| METUB WebTVAsia Awards | 1 | 1 |
| Ấn Tượng VTV | 2 | 6 |
| Giải Cánh diều | 1 | 1 |
| ELLE Style Awards | 1 | 1 |
| Giải Mai Vàng | 4 | 18 |
| HTV Awards | 4 | 5 |
| Liên Hoan Phim Việt Nam | 3 | 4 |
| WeChoice Awards | 0 | 4 |
| Won | 21 |
| Nominated | 50 |

Trấn Thành (Full name: Huỳnh Trấn Thành) is a Vietnamese comedian, filmmaker, screenwriter, and master of ceremonies who works mainly in the Tamil film industry.

== Prize ==
=== International ===
==== METUB WebTVAsia Awards ====
| Year | Category | Nominated works | Result | Note |
|---|---|---|---|---|
| 2019 | Outstanding Celebrity Star on YouTube | | Won | |

=== Domestic ===
==== VTV Impressions ====
| Year | Category | Nominated works | Result | Note |
|---|---|---|---|---|
| 2014 | Dẫn chương trình Ấn tượng | | Nominated | |
| 2015 | Dẫn chương trình Ấn tượng | | Won | |
| 2015 | Nghệ sĩ hài Ấn tượng | | Won | |
| 2016 | Dẫn chương trình Ấn tượng | | Nominated | |
| 2017 | Dẫn chương trình Ấn tượng | | Nominated | |
| 2017 | Nghệ sĩ hài Ấn tượng | | Nominated | |

==== ELLE Style Awards ====
| Year | Category | Nominated works | Result | Note |
|---|---|---|---|---|
| 2016 | Nam diễn viên phong cách của năm | | Won | |
| 2016 | Người dẫn chương trình phong cách của năm | | Nominated | |
| 2017 | Nam diễn viên phong cách nhất của năm | | Nominated | |
| 2017 | Người dẫn chương trình phong cách của năm | | Nominated | |

==== HTV Awards ====
| Year | Category | Nominated works | Result | Note |
|---|---|---|---|---|
| 2013 | Nghệ sĩ hài được yêu thích nhất | | Nominated | |
| 2014 | Nghệ sĩ cống hiến | | Won | |
| 2015 | Người dẫn chương trình được yêu thích nhất | | Won | |
| 2016 | Người dẫn chương trình được yêu thích nhất | | Won | |
| 2016 | Nghệ sĩ hài được yêu thích nhất | | Won | |

==== Vietnam Film Festival ====
| Year | Category | Nominated works | Result | Note |
|---|---|---|---|---|
| 2019 | Nam diễn viên chính xuất sắc | Cua lại vợ bầu | Won | |
| 2021 | Kịch bản phim xuất sắc | Bố già | Won | |
| 2021 | Đạo diễn phim xuất sắc | Bố già | Nominated | |

==== Mai Vàng ====
| Year | Category | Nominated works | Result | Note |
|---|---|---|---|---|
| 2011 | Người dẫn chương trình | Hãy xem tôi diễn | Nominated | |
| 2012 | Người dẫn chương trình | Thử thách cùng bước nhảy | Nominated | |
| 2012 | Diễn viên hài | Tài Tiếu Tuyệt | Nominated | |
| 2013 | Người dẫn chương trình | Tài Tiếu Tuyệt | Nominated | |
| 2013 | Diễn viên hài | Tài Tiếu Tuyệt | Won | |
| 2014 | Người dẫn chương trình | Thử thách cùng bước nhảy | Won | |
| 2014 | Diễn viên hài | Ơn giời cậu đây rồi! | Nominated | |
| 2015 | Người dẫn chương trình | Thử thách cùng bước nhảy | Won | |
| 2015 | Nghệ sĩ của năm | | Won | |
| 2015 | Diễn viên hài | Đại hỷ | Nominated | |
| 2016 | Người dẫn chương trình | Người bí ẩn | Nominated | |
| 2016 | Diễn viên hài | Cười để nhớ | Nominated | |
| 2016 | Nam diễn viên điện ảnh - truyền hình | Bệnh viện ma | Nominated | |
| 2017 | Người dẫn chương trình | Người bí ẩn | Nominated | |
| 2018 | Người dẫn chương trình | Người bí ẩn, Nhanh như chớp nhí | Nominated | |
| 2018 | Diễn viên hài | Giọng ca bí ẩn | Nominated | |
| 2019 | Người dẫn chương trình | Người ấy là ai | Nominated | |
| 2019 | Nam diễn viên điện ảnh - truyền hình | Cua lại vợ bầu | Nominated | |

==== Typical artists in the field of Performing Arts ====
| Year | Category | Nominated works | Result | Note |
|---|---|---|---|---|
| 2022 | Diễn viên điện ảnh nổi bật của năm | Bố già | Won | |

==== Ngôi Sao Xanh ====
| Year | Category | Nominated works | Result | Note |
|---|---|---|---|---|
| 2021 | Nam diễn viên chính xuất sắc nhất | Bố già | Nominated | |
| 2021 | Nam diễn viên được yêu thích nhất | Bố già | Won | |
| 2021 | Đạo diễn xuất sắc nhất | Bố già | Won | |
| 2021 | Sáng tạo xuất sắc | Bố già | Nominated | |

==== Viet Film Fest ====
| Year | Category | Nominated works | Result | Note |
|---|---|---|---|---|
| 2021 | Nam diễn viên chính xuất sắc nhất | Bố già | Won | |

==== WeChoice Awards ====
| Year | Category | Nominated works | Result | Note |
|---|---|---|---|---|
| 2015 | Nghệ sĩ có hoạt động đột phá | | Nominated | |
| 2016 | Gương mặt gây bão mạng xã hội | | Nominated | |
| 2019 | Nghệ sĩ có hoạt động nổi bật | | Nominated | |
| 2020 | Nghệ sĩ có hoạt động nổi bật | | Nominated | |

==== Other prizes ====
- Giải nhất Cặp đôi hoàn hảo (mùa 1)
- Giải ba Én vàng 2006
