= Suboi =

Vietnamese rapper (born 1990)

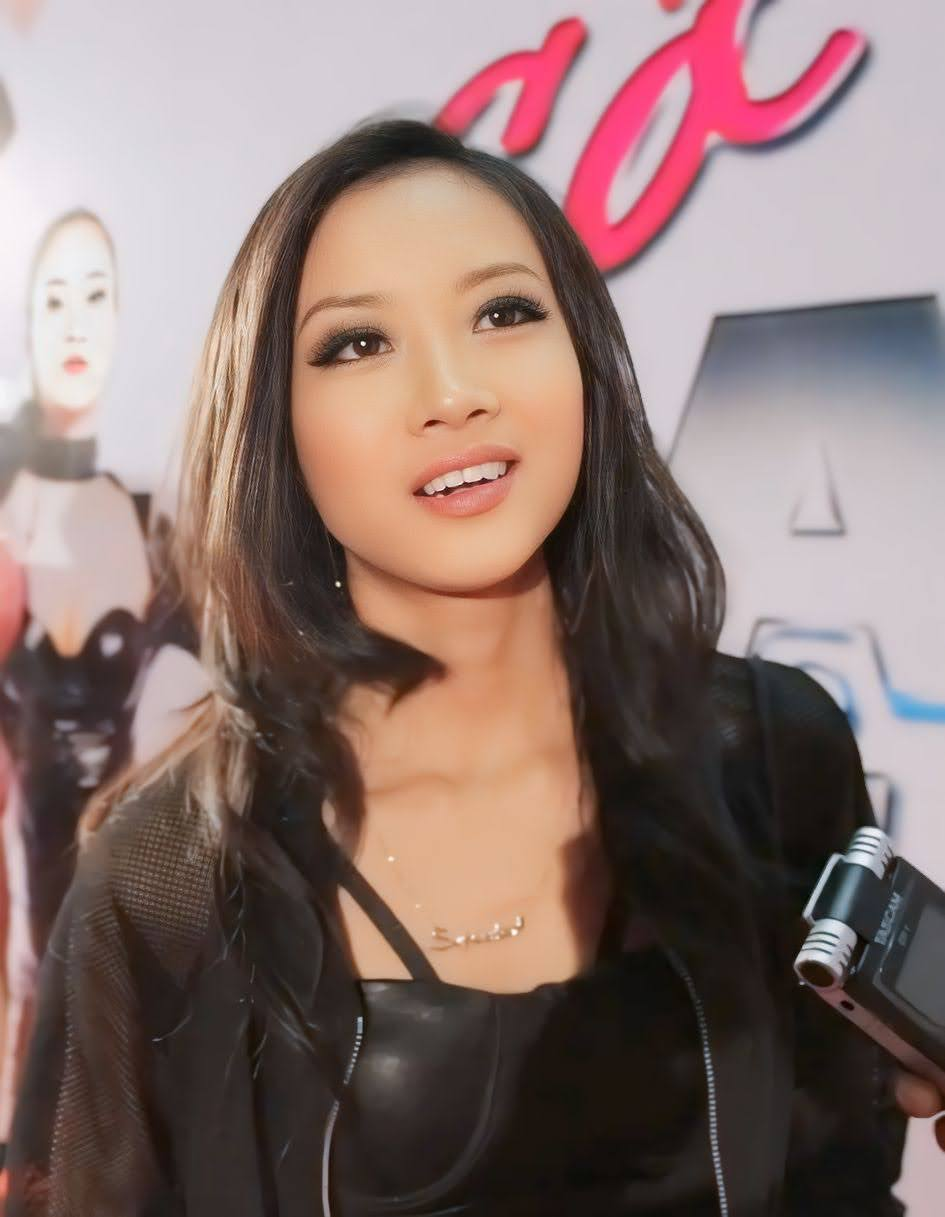
- Suboi in 2014
- Born: Hàng Lâm Trang Anh; 14 January 1990 (age 36); Ho Chi Minh City, Vietnam
- Other names: Suboi, Quiet Bunny
- Occupations: Rapper, singer, songwriter
- Years active: 2005–
- Partners: Bảo Nguyễn (2010–2019); Nodey Dôn Nguyễn (2019–)
- Children: 1
- Musical career
- Genres: Hip hop; rap; alternative hip hop; dubstep; electronic
- Works: Suboi discography
- Labels: Music Faces Entertainment; Suboi Entertainment
- Website: www.suboimusic.com

Hàng Lâm Trang Anh (born January 14, 1990), known by her stage name Suboi, is a Vietnamese rapper, singer, and songwriter.

Born and raised in Ho Chi Minh City, also where her musical career begins, Suboi is one of the first Vietnamese female rapper to become successful in her country and is considered Vietnam's queen of hip hop.

== Biography ==
Suboi’s mother worked as an office worker at the Australian consulate in Saigon, and her father worked as a factory manager. Suboi revealed that she used to be a shy girl who spent much of her time on words and composing ridiculous poems.

Suboi gained her onstage name during middle school, “Su” being her nickname at home and “boi” given to her by friends due to her tomboy nature. Growing up, she was a rebellious teenager who "got involved with some bad people" but turned to music for guidance.

She became a fan of hip hop music at the age of 14 and improved her English by listening and rapping along to famous American rappers such as Eminem. At the age of 15, she started spending time with people who she later considers bad guys, which worried her parents and made them keep a closer eye on her. She chose to have a career in music because it made her feel safe. She was also interested in skateboarding. She accepted an invitation to join a nu-metal band covering Linkin Park songs.

Suboi used to work as an English teacher and a clown in children’s birthday parties to pursue her passion for rap. She believes the main elements that make a successful rapper are to never give up, listen to others, take advice, and learn. From the first days of her career, Suboi had difficulties finding her own message to audience and forming her own style. Her family and the audience’s preconception that rap is only for men were two challenges to the very first Vietnamese female rapper. Though her parents support her later, they didn’t want their daughter to be a tomboy who always listened to rock, rap and read lyrics on beats.

Her mainstream recognition grew when she was invited to rap on Vietnamese pop star Ho Ngoc Ha's chart topping singles "My Apology" and "Girls' Night" in 2009.

Suboi was invited to perform at CAAMFest 2014, the largest Asian American media showcase in the United States; she couldn’t come to the U.S since she had trouble getting her visa. Instead, she made her debut in America on March 13, 2015, co-headlining with Awkwafina, a female rapper from New York. She also made her debut as actress in CAAMFest 2015 in San Francisco, in "Hollow", a horror movie directed by Ham Tran. The film became a box office hit and led to her first starring role in 2016's "Bitcoin Heist", a Vietnamese heist film also directed by Ham Tran.

In 2015, she was invited to perform an official showcase at South by Southwest (SXSW), becoming the first Vietnamese artist ever to be officially invited by the festival. She performed to rave reviews and in 2016, she was invited back to perform at SXSW for the second year in a row.

In 2016, Suboi was rebuilding her musical career after what she considered a creative lull. She released a new single entitled "Doi" early in the year, showcasing a "dark beat" which she had been reluctant to release earlier in her career.

On May 25, 2016, Suboi came to immediate international media attention after rapping for President Barack Obama at a Q&A session with young leaders in Ho Chi Minh City. The brief exchange between Suboi and the US President prompted him to reflect on the history of rap music and the importance of art to a nation.

== Artistry ==
Suboi’s favorite kinds of music range from rock and rap to chamber music. Asked about her versatile rap style, she states, "I'm a fan of Mos Def, Da Brat, Snoop Dogg, Aaliyah, Foxy Brown and the newest one Azealia Banks. I also enjoy everything nice from Norah Jones, Bob Marley, Erykah Badu, to German artist Kool Savas, Xavier Naidoo ... all of these artists' music have played a very important role in my personal life." She raps in both English and Vietnamese. Her lyrics deal with family, love, social pressure, and daily life in Vietnam.

== Discography ==
=== Studio albums ===
List of studio albums
Title	Album details
Walk	Release: August 1, 2010; Label: Music Faces; Formats: Digital download, streaming, CD
Run	Release: September 24, 2014; Label: Suboi Entertainment; Formats: Digital download, streaming
No Nê	Release: July 15, 2021; Label: Suboi Entertainment; Formats: Digital download, streaming

=== Extended plays ===
List of extended plays
Title	EP details
2.7	Release: October 31, 2017; Label: Suboi Entertainment; Formats: Digital download, streaming

=== Singles ===
==== As lead artist ====
List of singles as lead artist with released year and album name
Title	Year	Album
"Walk"	2010	Walk
"Rainbow"	2010	Walk
"Những Đứa Bạn"	2010	Walk
"Away"	2010	Walk
"Quê Hương Việt Nam" (with Anh Khang)	2010	Non-album singles
"1000 Watts"	2012	Non-album singles
"Run"	2012	Run
"Nói Với Em"	2013	Run
"Trời Cho" (featuring Hoàng Touliver)	2015	Non-album singles
"Đời"	2016	Non-album singles
"Lắm Mồm"	2016	Non-album singles
"Lời Thỉnh Cầu" (Note: New version for the EP 2.7, the original version first appeared on the album Run) (featuring Mino & The Band)	2017	2.7
"Người Ta Hiểu" (featuring Mino & The Band)	2017	2.7
"N-Sao"	2018	No Nê
"Công"	2018	No Nê
"Cho Không"	2019	No Nê
"Bet On Me"	2019	No Nê
"Cả Ngàn Lời Chúc" (with Rhymastic)	2021	Non-album single
"Sickerrr"	2021	No Nê
"Together" (Note: Arena of Valor World Cup 2021 official song) (with Gavin.D)	2021	Non-album singles
"Dâu Thiên Hạ"	2024	Non-album singles

==== As featured artist ====
List of singles as featured artist with released year and album name
Title	Year	Album
"Xin Hãy Thứ Tha" (Hồ Ngọc Hà featuring Suboi)	2009	The First Single
"I Love Vietnam" (Antoneus Maximus hợp tác với Suboi, Hà Okio, Thảo Trang, Thanh Bùi)	2012	Non-album singles
"Người Ơi Người Ở Đừng Về (Đức Phúc featuring Suboi)	2021	Non-album singles
"Đôi Khi" (Nodey featuring Suboi)	2021	:-)

== Filmography ==
=== Feature films ===
Year	Title	Role	Notes
2014	Hollow	Hương	
2016	Bitcoin Heist	Vi	
2019	Asia Rising: The Next Generation of Hip Hop	Herself	Documentary

=== Television shows ===
Year	Title	Role	Air on	Notes
2019	Yo! MTV Raps	Guest	MTV Asia	Episode 2
2020	Rap Việt	Coach	HTV2	Season 1
2023	Rap Việt	Judge	HTV2	Season 3
2024	Rap Việt	Coach	HTV2	Season 4
