= ON-Vie Dramas =

- Broadcast area: Vietnam
- Network: Vietnam Cable Television Corporation; Vie Channel
- Headquarters: Vietnam

Programming
- Language: Vietnamese
- Picture format: 1080p 16:9

Ownership
- Owner: Vietnam Cable Television Corporation; Vie Channel
- Sister channels: Vie Channel: HTV2 - Vie Channel; ON-Vie Giải Trí; VTVcab channels

History
- Launched: December 1, 2005; 20 years ago
- Former names: VCTV7; VTVcab 7 - D-Dramas; VTVcab 7 - Vie Dramas; VTVcab 10 - Vie Dramas; VTVcab 19 - Vie Dramas

ON-Vie Dramas is a general drama television channel broadcasting 24/7 since December 1, 2005. It is a collaborative channel between Vie Channel Joint Stock Company, a subsidiary of DatVietVAC Group Holdings, and the Vietnam Cable Television Corporation (VTVcab) under Vietnam Television

== History ==
Launched on December 1, 2005, under the name VCTV7, the channel served as a platform for foreign films and series. On February 22, 2012, the airtime for VCTV7 was leased by D.I.D TV Joint Stock Company (now renamed Vie Channel Joint Stock Company), which revamped the content and rebranded the channel as D Dramas.
On November 1, 2015, the channel began broadcasting in HD.

On January 30, 2019, VTVcab 7 was rebranded from D Dramas to Vie Dramas.

Starting at 6:00 AM on September 29, 2019, VTVcab 7 and VTVcab 10 swapped their channel content: VTVcab 10 became "Vie Dramas," while VTVcab 7 began airing the content previously featured on VTVcab 10 ("Health & Life").

Starting at May 17, 2021, VTVcab 10 and VTVcab 19 swapped their programming content: VTVcab 10 became Film TV, while VTVcab 19 became Vie Dramas.

From June 15, 2023, through December 28, 2023, the name "Vie Dramas" was temporarily removed from the branding of the channel VTVcab 19 to ensure compliance with the Press Law.

On December 29, 2023, the channel was renamed ON Vie Dramas.

== See also ==
- Vie Channel
- HTV2 - Vie Channel
- ON-Vie Giải Trí
- DatVietVAC
