= Lâm Vlog =

Vietnamese YouTuber (born 1990)

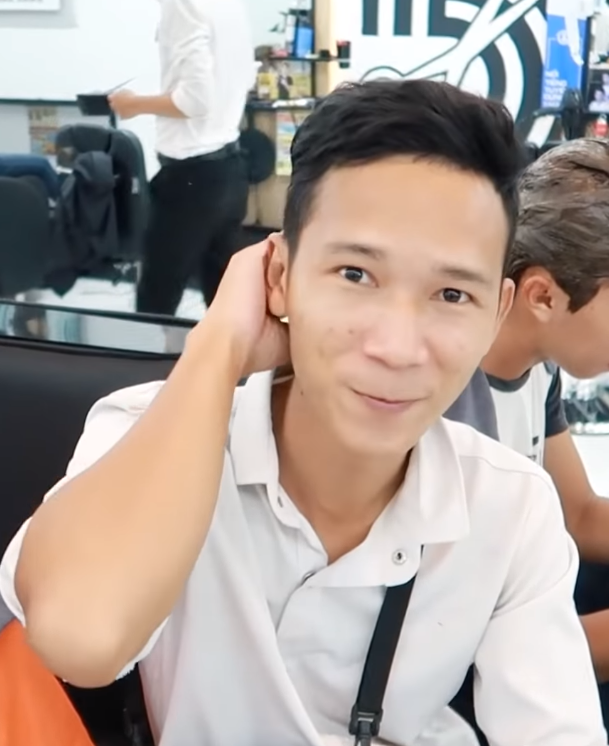
- Logo Lâm Vlog Lâm Vlog in 2019
- Born: Lê Hoàng Vũ Huy; February 22, 1990 (age 36); Thu Dau Mot, Binh Duong, Vietnam (now as Bình Dương Ward)

TikTok information
- Page: lamvlog
- Followers: 2,3 milion

YouTube information
- Channel: Lâm Vlog
- Years active: 2016–present
- Genres: Game; Travel; Eating; Manufacturing; Challenge
- Subscribers: 11.4 million
- Views: 4.7 billion
- Last updated: 22 October 2026

Lê Hoàng Vũ Huy (born February 22, 1990 in Binh Duong), commonly known by his stage name Lâm Vlog or Lâm, is a Vietnamese YouTuber. As of October 2026, Lâm's YouTube channel had over 11.4 million subscribers, with over 4.7 billion views, ranking 9th among the most subscribed YouTube channels in Vietnam.

== Life and career ==
Lâm Vlog, whose real name is Lê Hoàng Vũ Huy, was born on February 22, 1990, and is commonly known as Lâm at home. Born into a disadvantaged family, he has worked various jobs and helped his family weld iron gates and other metalwork for about 8 years. Besides working with metalwork during the day, Lâm also does web programming at night.

In early 2016, Lâm launched his YouTube channel and began uploading videos. His content covered topics such as survival experiences, food, and travel. According to Dân Việt, each of Lâm's videos averages between 500,000 and 2 or 3 million views. Besides videos with several million views, Lâm also has videos with over 10 million views. In addition to his official channel, Lâm Vlog with 11 million subscribers, Lâm also owns a secondary channel Lâm TV with nearly 4 million subscribers. Lâm has attracted over 1 billion views across all his YouTube channels. In 2019, Lâm Vlog topped the list of the best quality YouTube channels in Vietnam according to Social Blade.

Since 2020, Lâm has switched to making videos with his friends. According to Lâm, he can invest from 30 to 40 million VND for each video.

== Private life ==
Lâm has a wife, Nguyễn Thị Kim Châu, a chemistry teacher. They got married in 2019 and have a daughter. His family currently lives in Thu Dau Mot, Binh Duong. (now in Ho Chi Minh City).

== Awards and nominations ==
Year	Award Ceremony	Category	Results	Notes
2020	WeChoice Awards	Hot YouTuber of the Year	Won	
