= Voice of Ho Chi Minh City =

Radio station in Ho Chi Minh City, Vietnam

Voice of Ho Chi Minh City Đài Tiếng nói Nhân dân Thành phố Hồ Chí Minh

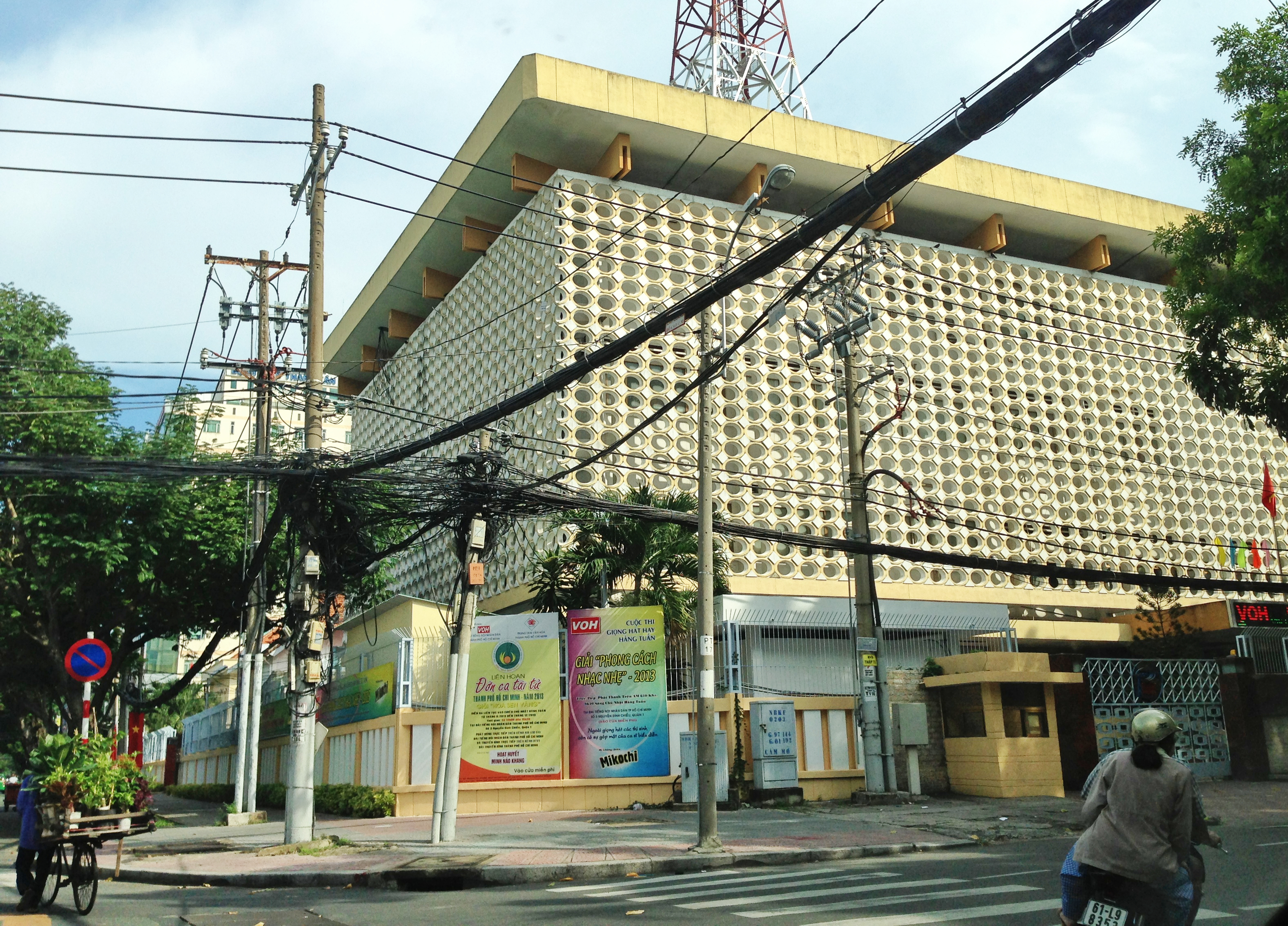
- Headquarters building
- Ho Chi Minh City; Vietnam
- Broadcast area: Southern Vietnam
- Frequencies: AM: 610 kHz; FM: 99.9 MHz, 95.6 MHz, 87.7 MHz, (92-92.5) MHz
- Branding: VOH

Programming
- Languages: Vietnamese, English, French, Chinese
- Format: All-news radio

Ownership
- Owner: People's Committee of Ho Chi Minh City: Ho Chi Minh City Television

History
- Founded: February 2, 1962
- Former names: Liberation Radio; Liberation Saigon Radio

Technical information
- Transmitter coordinates: 10°47′28″N 106°42′14″E

Links
- Webcast: Listen live
- Website: voh.com.vn

Voice of Ho Chi Minh City (VOH), fully the Voice of Ho Chi Minh City's People (Đài Tiếng nói Nhân dân Thành phố Hồ Chí Minh), is the official radio broadcasting station of Ho Chi Minh City and now a component of Ho Chi Minh City Television. Its headquarters is originally located at No. 3 Nguyễn Đình Chiểu Street, Đa Kao, District 1, Ho Chi Minh City (now is Saigon ward), while the transmitter station is at No.12, Alley 118 Man Thiện Road, Tăng Nhơn Phú (Thủ Đức), Vietnam.

== History ==
On 2 February 1962, National Liberation Front of South Vietnam set up Liberation Radio (Đài Phát thanh Giải phóng) in South-controlled territory, and conducted its first airing with the title "This is Liberation Radio, the voice of the National Front for the Liberation of South Vietnam".

Due to the fierce war effort, Liberation Radio was relocated around several provinces before being stationed in Hanoi, and was operating under the aliases of "Viz 1080 Ministry of General Staff", "C55" and "CP90". For the duration of the war, this station maintained broadcasting for 10 hours a day in 5 languages: Vietnamese, French, English, Chinese and Khmer.

Following the Liberation of Saigon on 30 April 1975, Liberation Radio from Tây Ninh took over the base of Radio Vietnam, which was operated by the Government of Republic Of Vietnam. Under the Central Propaganda Department of the Communist Party of Vietnam, Liberation Radio changed its name to Liberation Saigon Radio (Đài Phát thanh Sài Gòn Giải phóng).

On 1 September 1976, Liberation Saigon Radio was renamed Voice of Ho Chi Minh City's People.
