= Kênh 14 =

Vietnamese website

Kenh14.vn
- Website type: News website
- Available in: Vietnamese
- Founded: 2007
- Owner: VCCorp
- Website: kenh14.vn

Kênh 14 is a Vietnamese news website, with a focus on entertainment and celebrity-related topics. The site's content is aimed at younger users - including but not limited to teenagers and students.

Kênh 14 is currently owned by VCCorp.

== Main categories ==
Kênh 14's main categories include:

- Star
- Musik
- Ciné
- TV Show
- Beauty & Fashion
- Life
- Society
- International news
- Health
- Eating & Traveling
- Sports
- Discovery
- 2-Tek
- Cool things
- School
- Watch & Buy

== Criticisms ==
Kênh 14 is considered by many people as a tabloid site - as most of its published content contains subjective and biased information. According to an article published in Tuổi Trẻ newspaper in 2009, the reason was that many of the site's collaborators were still students; hence, they did not have the required journalism skills and ethics.

Many Vietnamese public figures, including MC Phan Anh, Hương Tràm, Phạm Hương, Đàm Vĩnh Hưng, etc., have been directly or indirectly mentioned by Kênh 14 - in a controversial way. Some of them have threatened to sue the site.

On June 6, 2012, Kênh 14 published an article titled "Tú bà Mỹ Xuân khai thêm hai người đẹp bán dâm" (Procurer Mỹ Xuân reveals two more beauties involved in prostitution). One of the two characters mentioned in the article was L.N.K. - coincidentally, this was the same as the abbreviation of a Vietnamese actress name, Lê Ngân Khánh. The next day (June 7), Kênh 14 posted a picture of Khánh's private house to illustrate the topic of the article. On July 12, 2012, Ngân Khánh sued Kênh 14 for implying her participation in prostitution.

On December 26, 2016, Kênh 14 was issued an administrative sanction by the Department of Radio, Television and Electronic Information with a total fine of VND 80 million - for publishing inappropriate content about actor Minh Béo.

On March 17, 2021, Trấn Thành accused Kênh 14 of misrepresenting his statement to attract views for their article about his movie - Bố già.
