= Ho Chi Minh City Radio and Television =

Vietnamese television network

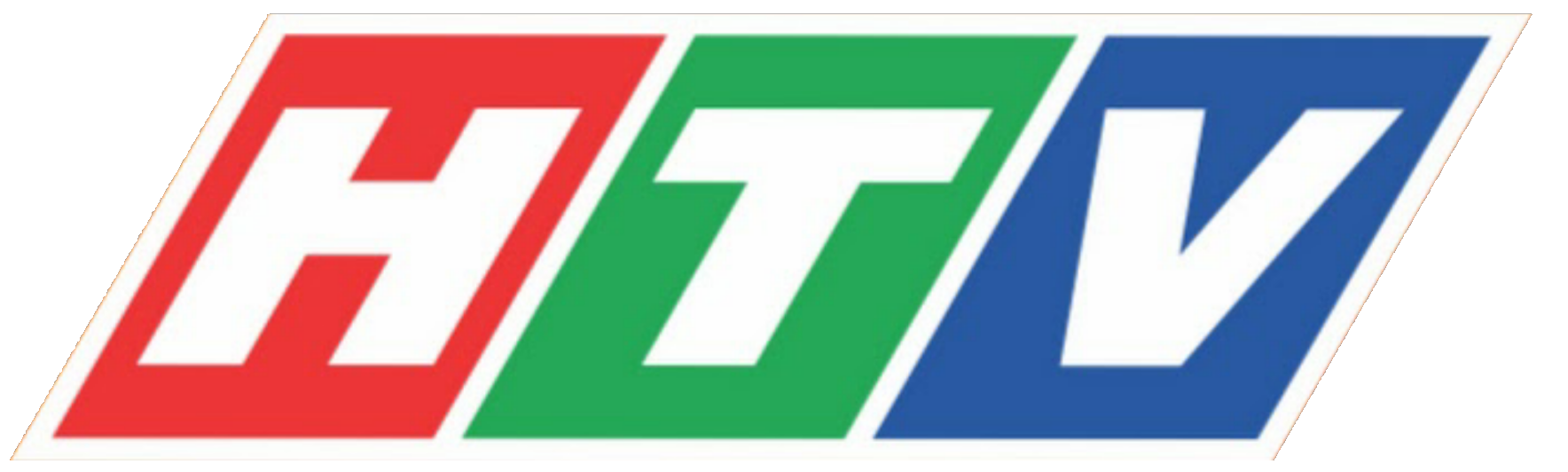
- Official logo from 2003, used from 2024 after modification.

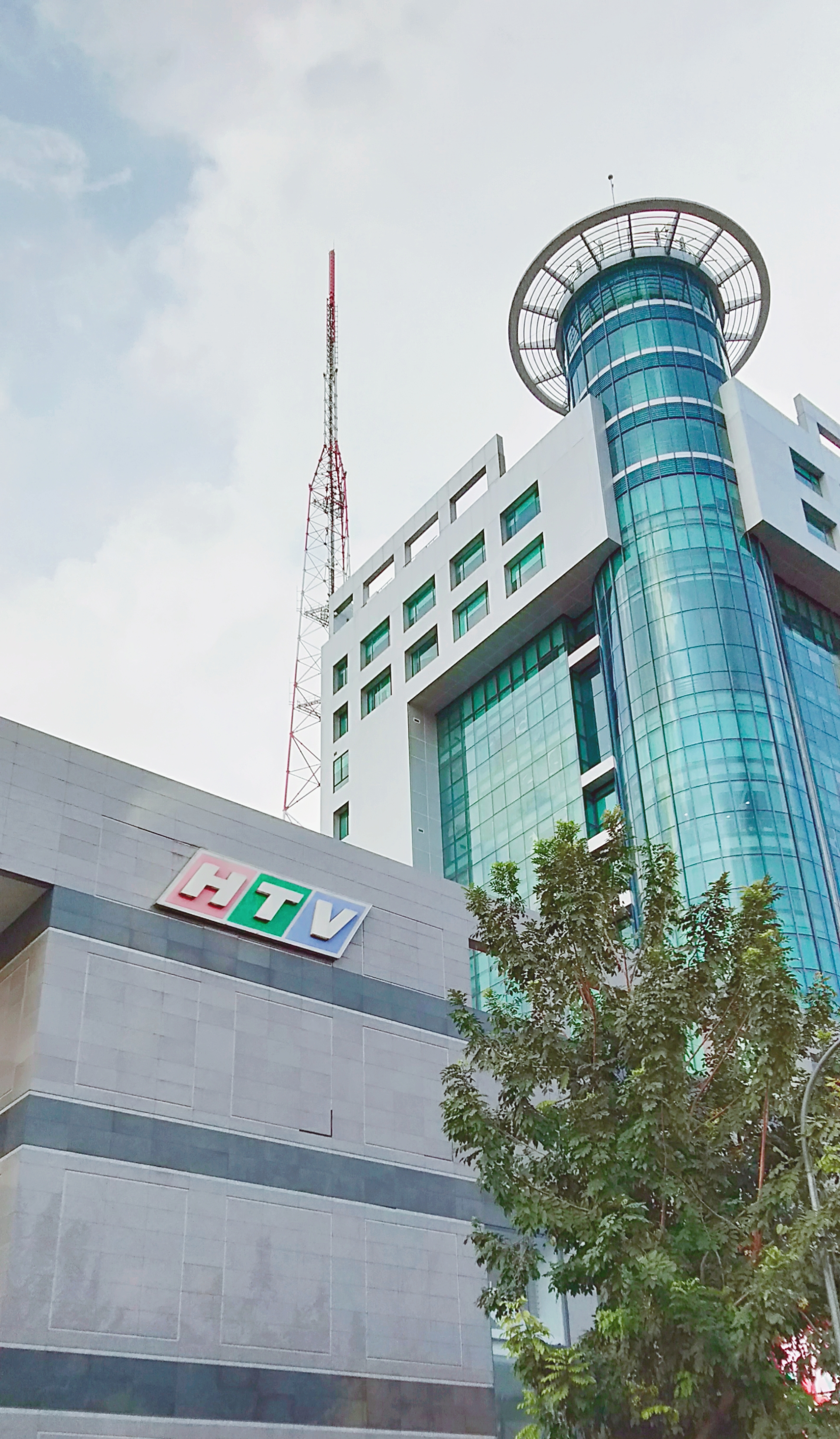
- Type: Radio broadcasting Television broadcasting Mass media (from 1 July 2026)
- Branding: HTV
- Country: Vietnam
- Availability: Vietnam; Worldwide
- Founded: 1 May 1975; 51 years ago (as Saigon Liberation Television)
- Headquarters: 9 Nguyen Thi Minh Khai Street & 14 Đinh Tien Hoang Street, Saigon Ward, Ho Chi Minh City, Vietnam
- Broadcast area: Local, and parts of Southeast Asia
- Owner: Ho Chi Minh City Press and Radio, Television Agency (Ho Chi Minh City Party Committee)
- Key people: Cao Anh Minh (General Director); Diep Buu Chi (Deputy General Director); Thai Thanh Chung (Deputy General Director); Nguyen Quoc Binh (Deputy General Director); Nguyen Thanh Quang (Deputy General Director); Truong Thanh Phong (Deputy General Director); Tran Hoang (Deputy General Director)
- Established: 1965; 61 years ago
- Transmission test: 22 January 1966; 60 years ago
- Launch date: 7 February 1966; 60 years ago 1 May 1975; 51 years ago
- Former names: THVN9
- Picture format: 1080i HDTV
- Affiliation: Voice of Ho Chi Minh City
- Official website: htv.vn
- Replaced: Vietnam Television Network
- Subsidiary: HTV7; HTV9; HTV3; HTV2 - Vie Channel; HTV5 - Bchannel; HTV4; HTV The Thao; HTVC; HTVC Thuan Viet; HTVC Ca Nhac; HTVC Phu Nu; HTV1; HTV-TMS; HTVC Phim; VOH

Ho Chi Minh City Radio and Television Station (Vietnamese: Đài Phát thanh và Truyền hình Thành phố Hồ Chí Minh; abbreviation: HTV) is a media agency under the Ho Chi Minh City Press and Radio, Television Agency. Its predecessor was Vietnam Television of the Republic of Vietnam, first broadcasting in 1965 and becoming the first television station in Vietnam. After April 30, 1975, the station was taken over and renamed Saigon Liberation Television, broadcasting its first program on May 1, 1975 – marking the official birth of HTV.

From July 2, 1976, the station was named Ho Chi Minh City Television, and on October 1, 2025, after merge with two broadcaster of Bình Dương (BTV) and Bà Rịa – Vũng Tàu (BRT), and the Voice of Ho Chi Minh City (VOH Radio), HTV adopted its current name. From July 2026, the station will be merged with other media agencies (like Tuổi Trẻ and Sài Gòn Giải Phóng) of Ho Chi Minh City to form Ho Chi Minh City Press and Radio, Television Agency (Vietnamese: Cơ quan Báo và Phát thanh, Truyền hình Thành phố Hồ Chí Minh).

== History ==
The old name of HCMC Television was Saigon Liberation Television that began broadcasting on May 1, 1975.

On April 30, 1975, Saigon Television went off the air and after a night in Saigon without television, at exactly 7:00 p.m. on May 1, 1975, Le Minh Hien, a journalist from Hanoi, ordered Saigon Liberation Television to broadcast its first television program.

On October 1, 2025, as a part of nationwide administrative reforms, the Binh Duong and Ba Ria-Vung Tau provinces were merged into Ho Chi Minh City. The former provincial radio and television stations (BTV, BRT), along with Ho Chi Minh City Television and Ho Chi Minh City People's Voice Radio (VOH), merged to form the Ho Chi Minh City Radio and Television Station. The site of HTV's headquarters became the main headquarters for new agency.

== Operations ==
The station's main headquarters are located at the corner of Nguyen Thi Minh Khai and Dinh Tien Hoang Street. It also has an office in Ha Noi. HTV has two main analog channels - HTV7 and HTV9. The station started digital television at the end of 2013 using two to three multiplexes that transmit a total of 20 HTV-owned channels.

HTV7 and HTV9 also began broadcasting on the satellite in 2005, which covers the Southeast Asian countries and some other Asian countries. HTV has 20 channels (8 free channel is HTV7, HTV9, HTV1, HTV2 - Vie Channel, HTV3, HTV4, HTV5 - Bchannel, HTV Sports; 6 pay channel is HTVC Vietnamese, HTVC Movie, HTVC Women, HTVC Family, HTVC+, HTVC Travel & Life, and 5 radio channel is AM 610 KHz, FM 99.9 MHz, FM 95.6 MHz, FM 87.7 MHz, FM 92-92.5 MHz)

Channel	Launch date	Information
HTV9	7 February 1966	The channel was launched as THVN9 on February 7th, 1966, until April 29th, 1975, as the Fall of Saigon happen the next day, on 1 May 1975, the station was reconstituted as Saigon Liberation Television Station and rename to HTV9. The channel launched its HDTV version along with HTV7 on May 19, 2013.
HTV7	1986	The second channel of HTV, originally aired as an advertising and public service channel. Currently it airs many game shows including local franchises of Disney's Endemol Shine Group games Deal or No Deal, So You Think You Can Dance, Odd One In and others. An HDTV version of the channel was launched on May 19, 2013.
HTV1	1 October 2003	The channel was managed by VTL Media through a five-year lease term from 2007 to 2012. Afterwards, HCMC Television managed the channel using the public information format.
HTV2 - Vie Channel	1 October 2003	The channel was originally a sports channel until 2010 under a license. It broadcasts 24/7. It is jointly operated by Anh Binh Minh Media LLC, later transferred to DIDTV, belong DatVietVAC and HCMC Television. DIDTV also manage other channels like Giai Tri TV, D-Dramas and Lotte Datviet Home Shopping. On September 19, 2018, HTV2 changed into a new name - Vie Channel.
HTV3	1 October 2003	The channel was managed by TVM Corporation from June 2008 to August 2010 and again from June 2014. On July 1st, 2017, HTV partner with Purpose Media, to create HTV3 Dream TV. At first it was a kids-only channel; in 2007 it was planned to become an entertainment channel for kids and families. Since June 2008, HTV3 has served aired programmes for children, like Ben 10, Doraemon, Case Closed, etc. On November 1, 2022, HTV3 was returned to the company for management.
HTV4	1 October 2003	It was launched at the same period as HTV1, HTV2, HTV3, HTV7 and HTV9 under the name of HTV4. In the early years, HTV4 rebroadcast science programs that were aired on HTV7 and HTV9. Since early 2006, HTV4 began to purchase broadcast rights for programming from the BBC, Discovery Channel, National Geographic Channel, etc. HTV4 also produce programmes on Vietnamese education and science. HTV4 has its own website: htv4.vn. On August 10, 2018, HTV4 changed into a new name - HTV Key. On February 28th, 2026, HTV Key changed back to HTV4 after 7-8 years
HTV5 - Bchannel	June 1, 2005	is a television channel focusing on Eastern culture, celebrating national culture and moral values, and a lifestyle based on Buddhist philosophy, . It belongs to Ho Chi Minh City Radio - Television Station in collaboration with VTVcab and the Vietnam Buddhist Association. Previously, HTV5 was called BTV9 and was managed by Binh Duong Radio and Television Station.
HTV Thể Thao (HTV Sport)	2003	Launched in 2013 as HTVC Sport.
HTVC Thuần VIệt (HTVC Vietnamese)	1 July 2003	It broadcasts Vietnamese films.
HTVC Phim (HTVC Movie)	2005	It broadcasts TV movies and cinema films from around the world.
HTVC Gia Đình (HTVC Family)	June 28, 2007	Broadcast as a channel for families.
HTVC Phụ nữ (HTVC Women)	October 20, 2007	Broadcast as a channel for women.
HTVC Du lịch và Cuộc sống (Travel and Living)	November 2007	Broadcast as an information channel for travel and lifestyle.
HTVC Plus	2006	It was managed by Yan Group. also in test October 16, 2014 officially on January 9, 2015, and Channel B stop broadcast in 2017.
HTVC FBNC	February 2009	It is managed by IDG Vietnam Invest Fund and The Sang Corporation. Channel ceased on 1 January 2022.

== Services ==
HTV has:

- TFS, a TV studio, specializing in producing movies and documentary films.
- TV Service Center, a venue to contact the services and advertisements.
- Programme Production Centre, a production company, specialize in producing television programs.
- Ho Chi Minh City Television Cable Center brings quality programming to the audience in Vietnam and worldwide. The main programs include science, education, sports, movies, entertainment, etc.

HTV's cable system has various channels where HTV has rights to rebroadcast such as:

- National: Vietnam Television, An Viên Television, People's Police Television, Hanoi Radio Television, HTV3, Yan TV, among others
- International: Cubavisión International, CCTV-4, Caracol Internacional, TFC, Las Estrellas Internacional, TVE Internacional, TV Globo Internacional, among others, but it got removed in TV Guide By HTVC.
- News: CNN, France 24, Fox News, BBC World News, CNBC Asia, CNA, Bloomberg, Phoenix InfoNews Channel, NHK World TV, CGTN
- Documentary: Discovery Channel, TLC, Animal Planet, BBC Earth, Da Vinci Learning, Discovery Asia, Asian Food Channel
- Sports: (Currently no international sports channel yet as Fox Sports 1, 2, 3 defunct on October 1st, 2021)
- Movies and series: HBO, Cinemax, AXN, Cinema World
- Kids: Cartoon Network, Boomerang, Animax, Baby TV, CBeebies
- Music: Currently no international music channel yet.
- General Entertainment and Worldwide Promotion: E!, Star World, Fashion TV, Arirang, KBS World, TV5 Monde, DW-TV, tvN, ABC Australia, Warner TV, NHK World Premium, Outdoor Channel, BBC Lifestyle , and TV1
- These of the following channel that defunct in HTVC: Fox Sports, Fox Sports 2, Fox Sports 3, National Geographic, Nat Geo Wild, Nat Geo People, Channel V, MTV Vietnam, Disney Channel, Disney Junior, Baby TV, Disney XD, Fox Movies, Fox Family Movies, and Fox Action Movies

== Contests ==
- Vietnam Idol
- Duyên dáng truyền hình
- Tiếng hát Truyền hình Thành phố Hồ Chí Minh
- Chuông vàng vọng cổ truyền hình
- Én Vàng

== Awards ==
- HTV Awards
- Golden Album
- Golden Apricot

== Sport contests ==
- Cuộc đua xe đạp toàn quốc tranh Cúp truyền hình Thành phố Hồ Chí Minh
- Chinh phục đỉnh Everest
- Cây vợt vàng HTV Challenger
- Thử thách đua xe địa hình HTV

== Featured programs ==
=== Prizes, tournaments, contests ===
- Miss Television Contest 1967: THVN9 organizes the first contest of Vietnam & Southeast Asia.
- National Bicycle Race for Ho Chi Minh City Television Cup: The first stage road bicycle race by a television station in Vietnam; organized by the station's Sports Department.
- Ho Chi Minh City Television Singing Contest: The first and annually held singing contest on Vietnamese television.
- Hi-5
- Giai điệu trái tim: New song composition contest, with the participation of many musicians of that time.
- Chuông vàng vọng cổ: The first cải lương competition in the country, contributing to the development of cải lương.
- HTV Award
- Tiếng hát măng non truyền hình: the kids version of Tiếng hát truyền hình.
- Tiếng ca học đường
- Golden Swallow
- HTV Challenge Cup

=== Annual special program ===
- Tao Quan: A comedy program that aired on the last night of the lunar year and ended at the time of New Year's Eve, with the main character being Tao Quan - who synthesizes the main events. occurred during the year. "Tao Quan" first premiered in Vietnam on HTV9 on New Year's Eve and became the most anticipated program on New Year's Eve in the two decades.

=== Other ===
- Nhịp cầu âm nhạc: The first live on-demand music program in Vietnam. The program has a phone number with 6 lines to receive direct requests from the audience, broadcast once a month on channel HTV7.
- Vầng trăng cổ nhạc: Ancient song program & cai luong excerpts airing monthly.
- Trong nhà ngoài phố
- Ngân mãi chuông vàng
- Vượt lên chính mình: A game show with low-income families winning money to pay off their debts and start businesses.
- Chinh phục đỉnh Everest: Athletes had to conquer four peaks: Fansipan, Kinabalu, Kilimanjaro, Island Peak before the challenge. finally the "roof of the world" - peak Everest. On May 22, 2008, the first 3 climbers of Vietnam, Bui Van Ngoi, Phan Thanh Nhien and Nguyen Mau Linh entered the list of conquerors. reach the summit of Mount Everest.
- Ngôi nhà mơ ước: The program to build houses for disadvantaged families across the country.
- Thay lời muốn nói.
- Thử thách cùng bước nhảy: Dance competition program, adapted from So You Think You Can Dance, co-produced by HTV and Đông Tây Promotion.
- 60 giây: General news program, security and order, society, domestic & international culture begin on January 1st, 2012, broadcast live in 3-time frames 06:30–07:00, 12:00–12:30 and 18:30–19:00 every day on HTV7 and HTV9, conducted by HTV News Center, Dien Quan & ADT Group Holdings.
- Tiếng hát mãi xanh
- Thần tượng âm nhạc - Vietnam Idol
- Người bí ẩn - Odd One In
- Bí mật đêm chủ nhật
- Vì yêu mà đến
- Running Man Vietnam: An adaptation of the Korean show of the same name.
- Nhanh như chớp
- Siêu trí tuệ Việt Nam: A television quiz adapted from The Brain and co-produced by HTV and Vie Channel of DatVietVAC.
- Rap Việt - The Rapper
- Rock Việt
- Xuân Hạ Thu Đông, rồi lại Xuân
- Cơ hội đổi đời
- Tiếng rao 4.0
- Hát mãi ước mơ
- Sàn đấu vũ đạo
- Hát cho ngày mai: Music program to honor doctors and volunteers during the COVID-19 pandemic.
- Mẹ vắng nhà, ba là siêu nhân - The Return Of Superman
- Đây chính là nhảy đường phố - Street Dance Vietnam
- 2 ngày 1 đêm - 2 Days and 1 Night

== Logo ==
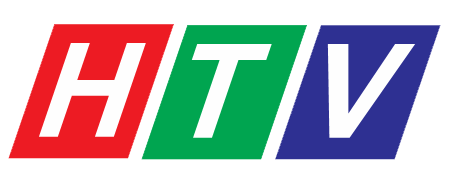
Used from 01/02/1995 to 01/01/2003

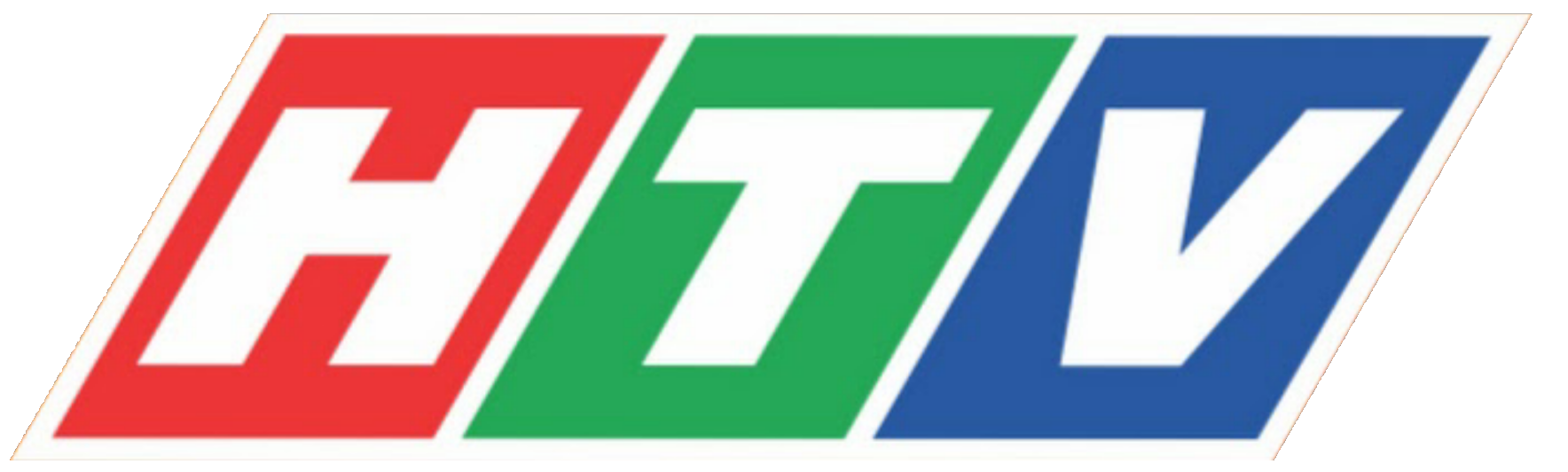
Used from 01/01/2003 to 01/01/2016 & 31/12/2024 to present

Used from 01/01/2016 to present

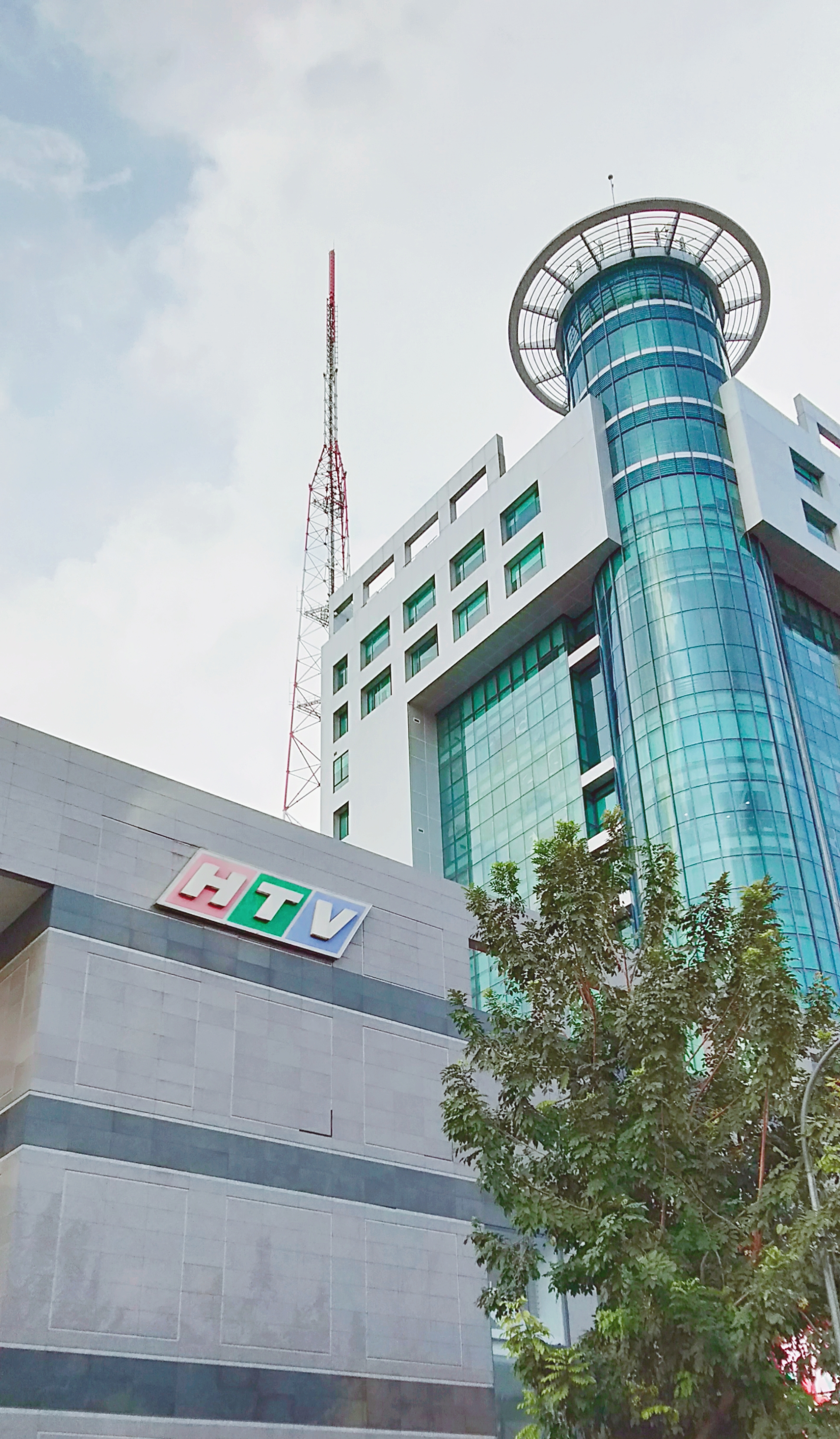
HTV's headquarters in Ho Chi Minh City
