= Vie Channel =

Vietnamese production and distribution company

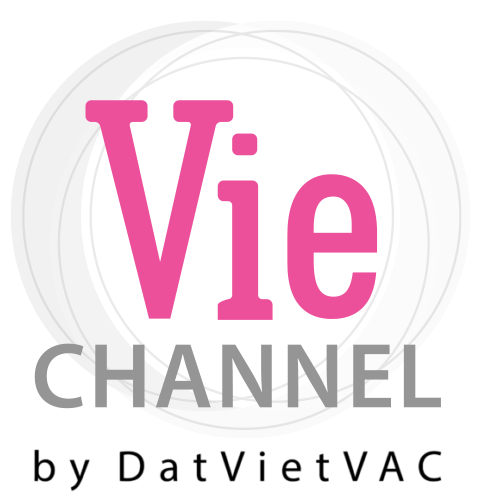
- Type: Joint-stock company
- Genre: Entertainment, Music, Reality TV, Sports
- Predecessor: Công ty Cổ phần Phát triển truyền thông Quốc tế Ánh Bình Minh (DID TV)
- Founded: 2003
- Headquarters: 222 Pasteur Street, Xuan Hoa Ward, Ho Chi Minh City, Vietnam, Vietnam
- Number of locations: Ho Chi Minh City, Hanoi
- Area served: Vietnam
- Key people: Bùi Hữu Đức (Giám đốc)
- Owner: DatViet VAC Group Holdings
- Parent: DatViet VAC Group Holdings
- Website: datvietvac.vn

Vie Channel Joint Stock Company (formerly: Anh Binh Minh International Media Development Joint Stock Company; abbreviated: Vie Channel) is a company specializing in producing entertainment programs under DatVietVAC Group Holdings. Vie Channel has cooperative television channels including: HTV2 - Vie Channel (HTV), ON-Vie Giải Trí and ON-Vie Dramas (VTVCab) and is the producer of a series of television programs with high viewership such as Anh trai "say hi", Em xinh "say hi", The Masked Singer Vietnam, Rap Viet, The Brain Vietnam, Who is Single Vietnam... The company's headquarters are located at 222 Pasteur Street, Vo Thi Sau Ward, District 3, Ho Chi Minh City.

== History ==
- 2003: Established Anh Binh Minh International Media Development Joint Stock Company - DID TV (the predecessor of Vie Channel) with the aim of bringing international standards of the media industry to Vietnam, through cooperation with the national television system. In the same year, the company cooperated in managing the DRT channel with Da Nang Radio and Television Station.
- 2006: Socialized cooperation with Ho Chi Minh City Television Station.
- October 16, 2010: Successfully restructured the HTV2 channel with a new look as a general entertainment channel.
- 2012–2013: Cooperated with VTVCab (formerly VCTV) to broadcast the D-Dramas channels (later Vie Dramas), LOTTE Datviet Homeshopping (LOTTE, VTVCab & DIDTV) and Entertainment TV (later Vie Entertainment) together with Le Media.
- January 2017: The company no longer manages Danang Radio and Television Station but still manages DRT1 channel (now Danang TV1) together with the station.
- 2018–present: Launched a series of programs and television films that created a sensation throughout the country such as Sticky Rice and Plain Rice, Who is Single Vietnam, The Brain Vietnam, Rap Viet.
- May 2019: DID TV, along with other companies such as Fansipan Media Joint Stock Company and DID Media Joint Stock Company, merged into Vie Channel.
- June 15, 2020, the new version of VieON was officially released by DatVietVAC Group Holdings with the business entity and service provider being Vie Channel Joint Stock Company.
- July 21, 2023, Vie Channel Company transferred the business entity and service provider of the VieON application to VieON Joint Stock Company.
- 2024–present: the "Say Hi" Universe has been launched, encompassing music programs such as Anh trai "say hi", Em xinh "say hi", and Tinh hà "say hi". This initiative has achieved resounding success through large-scale outdoor "Mega Concerts" that have drawn tens of thousands of attendees, while also generating substantial revenue from ticket sales, merchandise, and sponsorships.

== Controversy ==
=== Lawsuit against FPT Telecom ===
On December 6, 2018, the People's Court of District 3, Ho Chi Minh City, accepted a lawsuit filed by DID TV (the predecessor of Vie Channel), the producer of the TV series "Sticky Rice, White Rice," against FPT Telecom for copyright infringement and violations of intellectual property laws. Specifically, FPT Telecom copied, stored, and exploited 76 episodes of the series "Sticky Rice, White Rice" in the form of video-on-demand (VOD) on FPT Telecom's IPTV paid television service without any agreement with the producer. After allowing FPT Telecom to rectify the infringement by paying copyright fees for the unauthorized exploitation of episodes 1 to 76 of the film "Sticky Rice and White Rice" up to October 30, amounting to 9,120,000,000 VND (120 million VND per episode), without receiving any response, DID TV filed a lawsuit seeking compensation equivalent to the copyright fees.

=== Lawsuit against Spotify ===
In September 2020, Vie Channel officially filed a lawsuit against Spotify AB. According to the lawsuit, on August 11, 2020, Vie Channel documented the appearance of many audio recordings cut from the Rap Viet program on the Spotify application, which could be listened to by both free and paid accounts of the application. On August 13, Vie Channel filed a similar document regarding this infringement by Spotify AB with the program "Nguoi Ay La Ai" on the Spotify application. At the time of discovering the infringement by Spotify AB, Vie Channel did not have any agreement with Spotify AB regarding licensing to Spotify AB or any other individual or organization to broadcast the audio recordings of the Rap Viet and Nguoi Ay La Ai programs on the Spotify application in Vietnam. However, Spotify AB had violated the right to protect the integrity of the works by using technical means to interfere with the video recordings of these two programs.
