= WeChoice Awards =

Vietnamese annual awards

- Logo used for the current 2023 edition
- Awarded for: People and events loved by young people in the previous year
- Location: Ho Chi Minh City
- Country: Vietnam
- Presented by: VCCorp
- Formerly called: We Choice Awards (2014–2015)
- First award: 2014; 12 years ago
- Website: wechoice.vn

Television/radio coverage
- Network: VTV (2015–2016, 2018–2019); HTV/VieON (2019–); YouTube (2014–)

WeChoice Awards (formerly We Choice Awards, abbreviated as WCA) is a Vietnamese annual award recognizing the most prominent people and events of the year voted by the general public. It was first started in 2014 and presented by VCCorp, with the award ceremony taking place in Ho Chi Minh City.
