= Gạo nếp gạo tẻ =

- Genre: Psychology; Emotions; Family
- Based on: Wang's Family
- Written by: Nguyễn Hoàng Anh; Nhóm biên kịch DID TV
- Directed by: Võ Thạch Thảo (season 1); Nguyễn Hoàng Anh (season 2)
- Opening theme: Đi tìm tình yêu
- Country of origin: Vietnam
- Original language: Vietnamese
- No. of seasons: 2
- No. of episodes: 109 (season 1); 50 (season 2)

Production
- Executive producer: Bùi Hữu Đức
- Producer: Đỗ Đình Trường
- Editor: Nguyễn Hoàng Anh
- Running time: 45 mins/episode (season 1); 30 mins/episode (season 2)
- Production company: DID TV (now Vie Channel)

Gạo nếp gạo tẻ (lit. 'Sticky Rice and Plain Rice') is a television series produced by Vie Channel, directed by Nguyen Hoang Anh and Vo Thach Thao. The script is adapted from the popular Korean drama, The Wang Family (2013). Part 1 aired at 8:00 PM on Mondays, Tuesdays, and Wednesdays, starting May 7, 2018, and ending January 15, 2019. Part 2 aired at 8:00 PM on Mondays, Tuesdays, and Wednesdays, starting June 15, 2020, and ending October 7, 2020, on HTV2 - Vie Channel.

== Content ==
=== Season 1 ===
Mrs. Mai and Mr. Vuong's family consists of Mr. Vuong, a history teacher at a secondary school, and Mrs. Mai, a housewife living with Mr. Vuong's mother and younger brother. Having worked hard her whole life to provide for her children, Mrs. Mai always wished for them to be wealthy and have high social status. Huong was her eldest daughter. When Huong was pregnant, the whole family hoped for a son, so her mother-in-law doted on Mrs. Mai. When Huong was born, her mother-in-law was very disappointed and treated Mrs. Mai poorly. At the same time, the family faced many difficulties, causing Mrs. Mai to become irritable and indifferent to her eldest daughter. The situation escalated when Huong became pregnant before her marriage to Cong, Huong's husband. Mrs. Mai treated Huong even more contemptuously, feeling that she had brought shame to the family. While still in university, Huong had to drop out to give her younger sister and uncle a chance. Despite the criticism and contempt from her mother and society, Huong always worked hard to support her small family. Conversely, Mrs. Mai doted on Han - her second daughter - because she made it to the top 10 of Miss Vietnam, married a successful businessman, and after her birth, Mrs. Mai won the lottery and had money to renovate the house. Her third daughter, Minh, also gave her a headache when she arbitrarily quit her medical profession to become a screenwriter. Later, she became even more angry when her youngest daughter, Minh, insisted on marrying a husband who had been to prison...

=== Season 2 ===
Huong and Hai have three daughters: Minh Hieu, Minh Thao, and Minh Hien. One of them is not Hai's biological child, but the result of Huong's infidelity with a stranger. Meanwhile, Quynh also gave Hai two daughters. Not stopping there, both continued their "race" to have a son to solidify their position in their husband's family.

Later, Quynh and Huong both became pregnant and gave birth on the same day. Ironically, Huong gave birth to a son, while Quynh went on to give birth to twin girls. Hai secretly swapped Huong's son with one of Quynh's twin daughters. Huong thought her fourth child was a girl, while Quynh was well aware that Hai had swapped the babies. Around the same time, Huong's third daughter, Minh Hien, went missing.

After many misfortunes, the company registered under Hai's name went bankrupt. Quynh took the money and ran away with the fortune teller, leaving four children to Hai. Mrs. Ha Lan - Hai's mother - used all her wealth and assets to pay off debts and went to prison in place of her son. Feeling guilty and unable to face reality, Hai cowardly fled, leaving four children to be raised by Cuc - the maid. On the other hand, Huong, after losing her father, also harbored resentment and took three children away from her hometown. Hai's family with the children from his two wives officially fell apart...

== Marketing ==
On June 9, 2018, the film crew had a film marketing event with the small traders of Ba Chieu Market.

== Reception ==
=== Season 1 ===
The two channels, HTV2 - Vie Channel and VTVCab 1 - Vie Entertainment (the channels airing the drama "Sticky Rice, White Rice"), received a massive audience for the first time in history. The YouTube channels of HTV2 and Vie Entertainment also gained viewers thanks to their officially licensed versions of "Sticky Rice, White Rice," attracting nearly 200 million views. It can be said that this was one of the most-watched television dramas on YouTube at the time of its broadcast. For many months afterward, the name "Sticky Rice, White Rice" frequently appeared among the most searched keywords online, quickly becoming a landmark drama marking the return of Southern Vietnamese television after a period of what was considered a "hibernation" due to losses and a lack of impressive works.

The number of viewers for the TV series "Sticky Rice, White Rice" increased, so director Nguyen Hoang Anh initially decided to increase it to 99 episodes. This was expected to "change the ending, which was considered unsatisfactory in the original version." However, when the series had aired up to episode 97, and viewers were hoping for a more fitting and logical ending, the series was unexpectedly increased to 109 episodes. This decision subsequently sparked mixed reactions from the public.

In addition, many viewers commented that the content of the later episodes became weaker, with many plot points dragging on. One viewer reacted: "From episode 90 onwards, we couldn't tell if we were watching a movie or an advertisement, because there was an ad every 5 minutes. The plot seemed to be deliberately designed to attract viewers, building up situations but lacking any climax. Even the characters' psychology felt unrealistic."

The audience's outrage reached its peak when viewers wanting to watch "Sticky Rice, White Rice" online were forced to download software to watch it. This was the "last straw," causing viewers to collectively turn their backs on the series, feeling that it had repeatedly misled them and was greedy and obsessed with advertising revenue.

Despite its resounding success in the early episodes, the series "Sticky Rice, White Rice" disappointed viewers as it lost its initial appeal in the later episodes.

=== Season 2 ===
By exploring a completely new storyline compared to the first season, "Sticky Rice, White Rice 2" was expected to be better and higher quality than its predecessor. However, after only 9 episodes, the series has been criticized as "complicated" and "difficult to understand" due to the appearance of too many new characters without specific explanations, leaving viewers confused. Furthermore, the constant commercials during the show diluted the plot, lacking focus and becoming increasingly rambling and confusing in later episodes, especially towards the end, resulting in a decline in the series' appeal and making it less engaging. Even the average viewership on online streaming services for season 2 decreased by nearly 10 million views compared to season 1.
