= Mai Vàng Awards =

- Description: Artists making positive contributions to the field of arts and culture
- Country: Việt Nam
- Presented by: Báo Và Phát Thanh Truyền Hình Thành Phố Hồ Chí Minh (Người Lao Động)
- First award: 1995
- Final award: 2026
- Website: http://giaimaivang.com.vn

The Mai Vang Awards (Vietnamese: Giải Mai Vàng, lit. 'Golden Apricot Awards') is an annual award organized by the Báo và phát thanh, truyền hình Thành phố Hồ Chí Minh - Nguoi Lao Dong newspaper since 1995 to honor artists who have made positive contributions to cultural and artistic activities in Vietnam. The predecessor of the Mai Vang Award was the Most Popular Artist of the Year award, which was established in 1991. The current name was given by the composer Vu Hoang.

== Formation ==
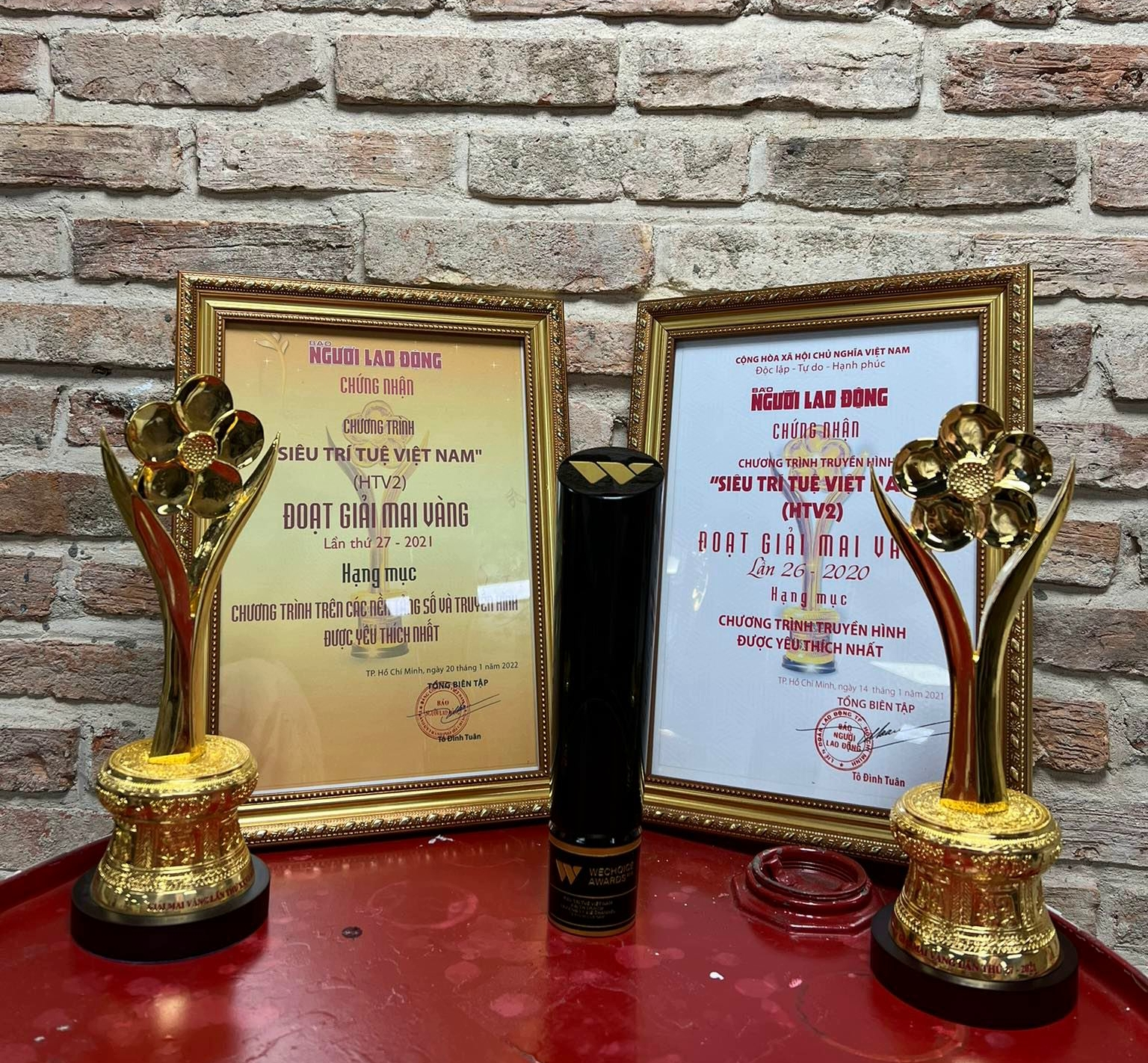
The Mai Vang Award certificates and trophies were presented to the television program Siêu trí tuệ Việt Nam (Brainiac Vietnam) for seasons 1 and 2.

In 1991, Phan Hong Chien, the editor-in-chief of the Nguoi Lao Dong newspaper at the time, wanted to create side activities to promote the paper's brand to the public and capture the interest of the artistic community. Based on that idea, the head of the paper's Culture and Arts department, journalist and composer Vu Hoang, proposed organizing an award for readers to vote for their favorite artists of the year. The inaugural awards were held in the final months of 1991, with the ceremony taking place right in the backyard of the newspaper's headquarters in front of an audience of about 500.

== Renaming to Mai Vàng Awards ==
Recognizing that the award had initially generated a certain level of attraction, the Editorial Board of the Nguoi Lao Dong Newspaper wanted to take the "Most Popular Artist of the Year" vote to a higher level. In 1995, the Nguoi Lao Dong Newspaper and the award's Organizing Committee met and officially decided to rename the award the Mai Vang (Golden Apricot) Award.

The person who came up with this name was the musician Vu Hoang. The meaning behind the name is to evoke the yellow apricot blossom, a flower that blooms during spring in Southern Vietnam, rather than referring to a blossom made of gold or "gold-standard" quality as seen in other awards. The award-winning artists are likened to these yellow apricot blossoms, bringing joy and happiness to everyone when they bloom in the spring.

== History ==
In 1995, the award was first held under the name Mai Vang Award. The award was still voted on by readers of the Nguoi Lao Dong newspaper, similar to the Most Popular Artist of the Year award from the previous year, but these voting results would be re-evaluated by an Arts Council consisting of heads of specialized art associations and renowned, prestigious artists.

The Mai Vang Awards were professionally upgraded for their 9th edition in 2003, featuring a more convenient voting process and dedicated software for ballot counting. The number of readers participating in the vote reached over 50,000. The awards ceremony was also produced with greater professionalism. The Lan Anh Music Center sponsored the stage, sound, and lighting for the event, moving the ceremony indoors instead of holding it at outdoor venues during the day, as had been done previously at Suoi Tien Cultural Theme Park or Dam Sen Cultural Park. Rang Dong Music Center also helped produce the program entirely free of charge. Additionally, the production crew—including director Huynh Phuc Dien, musician Le Quang, and artist Le Truong Tieu—along with the guest singers, performed almost entirely without compensation. This is the first time the Mai Vang Awards ceremony has sold tickets, with over 3,000 audience members, invited guests, and nearly 100 artists in attendance; it also marks the first time the event was broadcast live by Ho Chi Minh City Television for viewers at home.

On the 10th anniversary of the Mai Vang Awards in 2004, the Organizing Committee decided to revamp the voting process. For the first time, readers could vote through the Nguoi Lao Dong electronic newspaper in addition to the traditional print edition. Furthermore, the Mai Vang Awards introduced its official logo starting with this event. The awards ceremony was attended by over 4,000 audience members and more than 100 artists from across the country.

The Mai Vang Awards have evolved over the years toward a more professional organizational approach. However, voting results in recent years have faced significant public backlash, as some individuals and works have won despite not being particularly outstanding.

== Achievements ==
In 2025, the Mai Vang Awards set a record as the "longest-running annual cultural and artistic award ceremony in Vietnam voted for by the public and readers."
