= DatVietVAC Group Holdings =

Vietnamese media, entertainment, and technology group

DatViet VAC Group Holdings Joint Stock Company
- Type: Entertainment company
- Genre: Entertainment, Music, Reality television, Television drama, Sports, Advertising, Rights exploitation, Event organization
- Founded: April 20, 1994
- Headquarters: 222 Pasteur Street, Ho Chi Minh City, Vietnam
- Number of locations: 2 (Ho Chi Minh City and Hanoi)
- Area served: Vietnam
- Products: Television programs; Gameshows; Reality television; Online television; Television dramas; Television channels; OTT applications; Advertising; Rights exploitation
- Owners: Public Investment Fund; Mobility 54 Investment; Indonesia Investment Authority; Khazanah Nasional; Daiwa PI Partners
- Website: datvietvac.vn

DatVietVAC (or Dat Viet VAC) is a Vietnamese media, entertainment and technology group. Founded in 1994 by Dinh Ba Thanh, it is described as Vietnam's first and largest media company and launched the first private TV channel in the country. This group is described as the first and largest media company in Vietnam, standing behind a number of major brands such as Vie Channel, VieON, and Đông Tây Promotion,...

The headquarter of DatVietVAC is based in Ho Chi Minh City and Hanoi.

== History ==
=== 1994–1999: Beginnings and Laying the Foundations for the Media Industry ===
- On April 20, 1994, DatVietVAC was officially established. That same year, the company expanded its operations by establishing DatVietMEDIA (its first media company), DatVietOOH (its first out-of-home advertising company), and DDB ADVERTISING (its first advertising branch).
- 1995: DatVietVAC established TK-L, a content provider. This unit played a pioneering role in securing the rights to broadcast various programs within the Vietnamese market. TK-L later made a name for itself by securing the rights to a series of hit Asian blockbusters (such as *Story of Yanxi Palace*, *Ruyi's Royal Love in the Palace*, and *The Penthouse*) as well as popular television programs.

=== 2000 – 2009: Development of content and television networks. ===
- 2000: Dong Tay Promotion was established as a producer and distributor of original programming. This company is a pioneer in bringing international game show and reality television formats to Vietnam.
- 2003: DID TV was established as the first private television network in Vietnam, managing the DRT channel in partnership with the Da Nang Radio and Television Station.
- 2005: M&T Pictures was founded as a production house for television series, contributing to shaping the landscape of Vietnamese television drama.
- 2006: DatVietVAC partnered with the Ho Chi Minh City Television (HTV) station to implement the "socialization" (privatized management/co-production model) of the television channel HTV2.
- 2008: The media company WPP acquired a 30% stake in DatVietVAC. This deal includes strategic investments in DatVietVAC Media, Dong Tay Promotion, and TK-L.

=== 2010–2023: Comprehensive Digital Transformation and Multi-Platform Breakthrough ===
Beginning in 2012, DatVietVAC underwent a major restructuring, shifting its focus from a linear television foundation toward the digital space (Digital Ventures).

- 2010–2013: HTV2 was restructured into a general entertainment channel. Concurrently, DatVietVAC expanded its partnership with VTVCab to launch the general entertainment channel Giải Trí TV (VTVCab 1) and the classic drama channel D-Dramas (VTVCab 7). * 2012: DatVietVAC partnered with Lotte Group and VTVCab to launch a television shopping channel on cable TV in Vietnam, titled VTVcab 14 Lotte Dat Viet Homeshopping.
- 2013: Driven by breakthrough growth, DatVietVAC was honored by the World Economic Forum as one of the top 25 "Global Growth Companies."
- 2016: DatVietVAC expanded into digital services, modeling, and post-production through Digital OOH, the modeling agency Nomad Mgmt Vietnam, the artist management firm Karismalooks, and the post-production studio Song Minh.
- 2018: DatVietVAC launched a pilot version of the application VieON—a rebranded version of the VTVcab ON app—developed in partnership with VTVCab.
- 2018–2019: DatVietVAC swept up numerous awards with its hit television series Gạo Nếp Gạo Tẻ (winning the Gold Award at the National Television Festival, as well as the Mai Vang Award and the WeChoices Award).
- 2019: The group underwent a restructuring into the DatVietVAC Group Holdings model (with Chairman Dinh Ba Thanh holding a 54.9% controlling stake). DID TV and several other companies officially merged into Vie Channel, unifying the branding of their channels under the Vie Channel umbrella: Vie Channel, Vie Giải Trí (Vie Entertainment) and Vie DRAMAS.
- 2020: The OTT streaming platform VieON was launched in collaboration with the global consulting firm BCG Digital Ventures, alongside the merchandise platform VieSHOP.
- 2021: Launched digital magazine VieZ.
- 2022: The YouTube channel Vie Channel - HTV2 reached 10 million subscribers, becoming the first television channel’s social media channel in Vietnam to receive a YouTube Diamond Creator Award.
- 2023: AiACTIV was established as a provider of advertising technology (AdTech) and data solutions.

=== 2024–Present: Restructuring, the "Fan Economy" Boom, and IPO Ambitions ===
- 2024–Present: The launch of a series of music-entertainment programs, such as Anh Trai Say Hi, Em Xinh Say Hi, and Tinh Hà Say Hi, has achieved resounding success. Large-scale outdoor "Mega Concerts" have drawn tens of thousands of attendees, generating massive revenue through ticket sales, merchandise, and sponsorships.
- 2025: Establishment of VieIP, a unit specializing in the management and commercialization of intellectual property.
- December 1, 2025: DatVietVAC underwent a restructuring; the companies DatViet VAC Vision, DatViet VAC Digital Holdings, Vie Board, TK-L, Eternal, Innocore, VieON, and Vie Digital were separated from DatVietVAC. Concurrently, M&T Pictures was merged into Đông Tây Promotion.
- 2026: Following resounding commercial success, the successful organization of Mega Concerts, and the completion of its restructuring, DatVietVAC officially announced its IPO filing, with the public offering commencing on August 5, 2026. The group has set a revenue target of VND 3.5 trillion and a profit after tax of VND 420 billion for 2026, with an ambition to double its scale by 2030.
