= VieON =

Mobile application for television in Vietnam

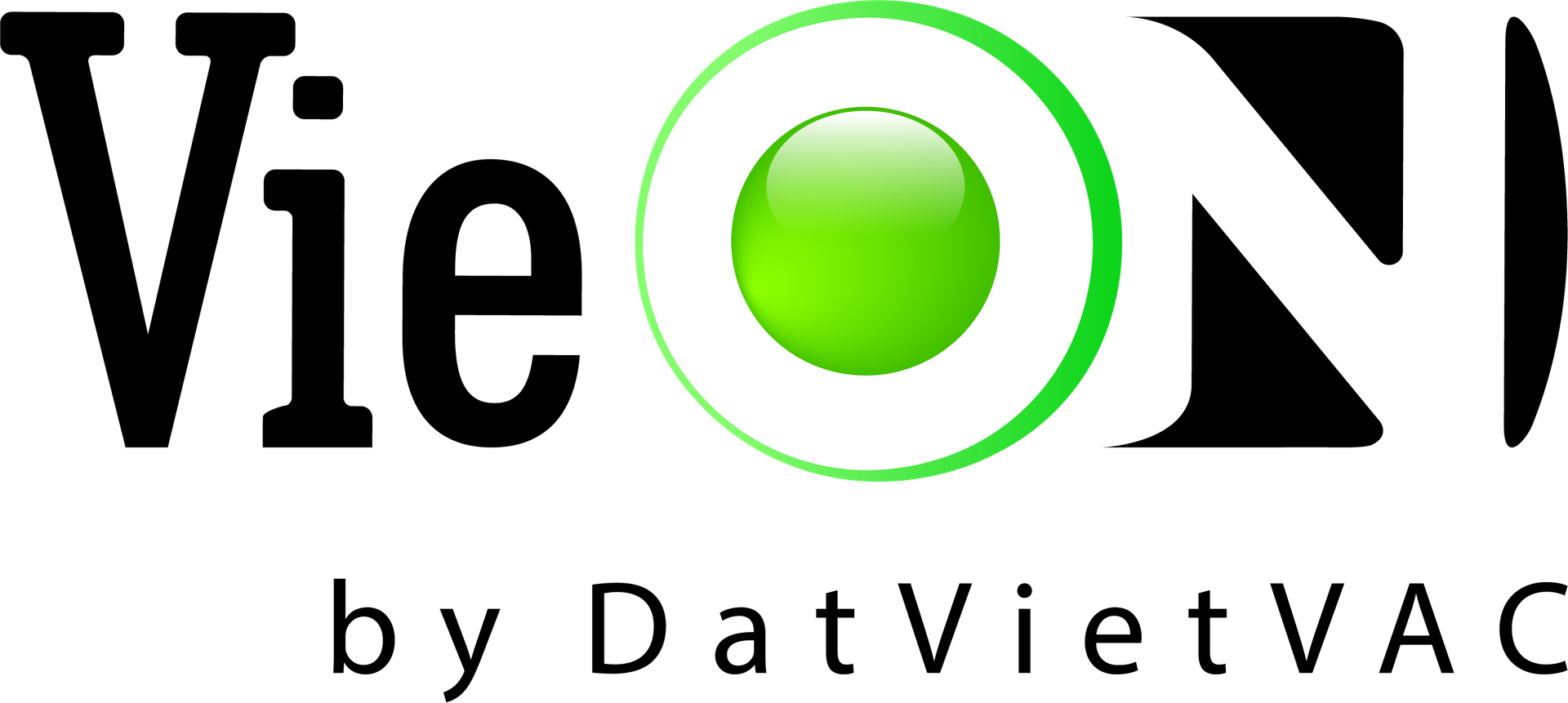

VieON is an mobile application for television and video on demand provided by VieON Joint Stock Company (formerly Dzones), a subsidiary of DatVietVAC Media and Entertainment Group in Vietnam. The app was launched in 2020, featuring over 140 domestic and international television channels, original series, popular entertainment programs known nationwide, top-tier sports events and live streaming of major events. Additionally, VieON provides animated films, television series and television programs from various countries such as South Korea and China.

== History ==
The application was planned for development in 2016, with the cooperation of strategic consulting partner BCG Digital Ventures from the United States. Prior to 2020, VieON was a rebranded version of VTVcab ON, a product managed by Vietnam Cable Television Corporation (VTVCab) and DatVietVAC.

On June 15, 2020, after four years of research and testing, the new version of VieON was officially released by DatVietVAC Group, with Vie Channel Joint Stock Company as the business entity and service provider. This is considered the official launch date of the application. On July 21, 2023, VieON transitioned its business operations and service provision to VieON Joint Stock Company.

In January 2024, VieON officially launched its global version, VieON Global, targeting Vietnamese users living abroad.

== Background ==
According to Kantar Media Vietnam, up to 84% of Vietnamese people aged 15–54 use social media daily, and in a similar survey by Nielsen, 90% of respondents said they watch live TV weekly. Additionally, according to research organization Muvi, Southeast Asia's OTT market revenue could reach $650 million annually starting next year.

Understanding this, DatVietVAC Group has planned to research and develop an OTT application, even though the Vietnamese market already has some major players such as FPT Play and the international giant Netflix. Additionally, DatVietVAC does not hide its ambition to make this application the number one entertainment channel for Vietnamese people.
