= HTV2 - Vie Channel =

Vietnamese TV channel

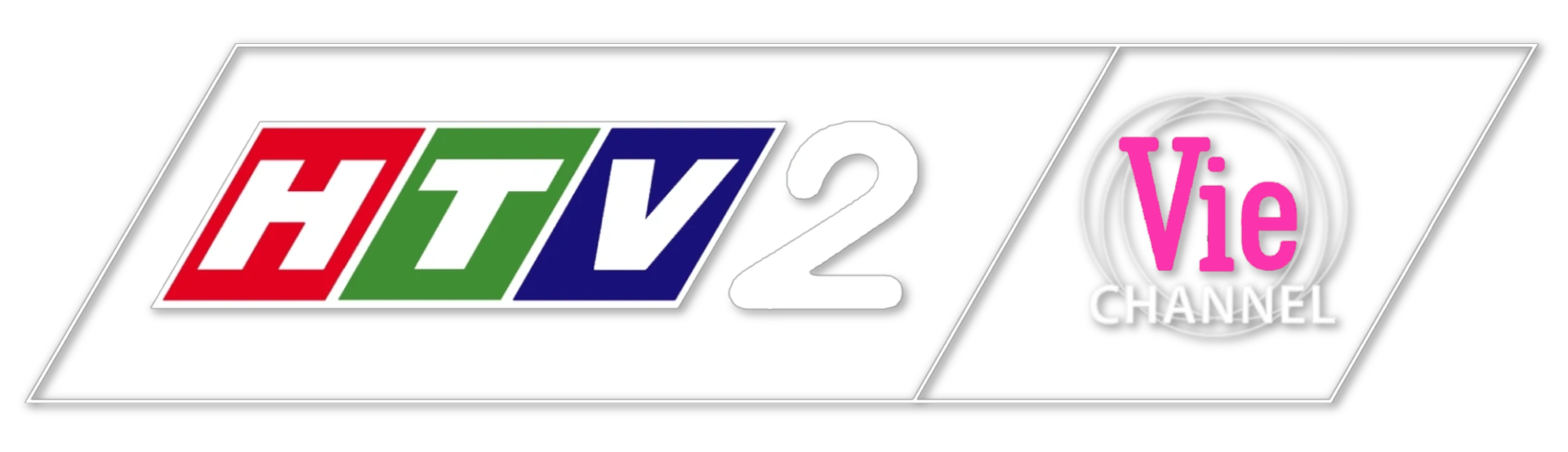
- Broadcast area: Vietnam
- Network: Ho Chi Minh City Radio and Television Station; Vie Channel
- Headquarters: Vietnam

Programming
- Language: Vietnamese
- Picture format: 1080p 16:9

Ownership
- Owner: Editorial Board of Digital and Cable TV Channels – Ho Chi Minh City Radio and Television Station; Vie Channel
- Sister channels: HTV Channel: HTV1; HTV2 - Vie Channel; HTV3; HTV4; HTV5 - Bchannel; HTV7; HTV9; HTV Thể Thao; HTV Co.op; HTVC channels: HTVC Thuần Việt; HTVC Gia đình HTVC Phụ Nữ; HTVC Ca nhạc HTVC Phim; HTVC Du lịch và Cuộc sống HTVC+ Vie Channel: ON-Vie Giải Trí; ON-Vie Dramas

History
- Launched: October 1, 2003; 23 years ago
- Former names: HTV2 - T HTV2 Digital

HTV2 – Vie Channel is a specialized general entertainment television channel broadcasting 24/7 since November 1, 2003. It is a collaborative channel between Vie Channel Joint Stock Company, a subsidiary of DatVietVAC Group Holdings, and the Editorial Board of Digital and Cable Television Channels under the Ho Chi Minh City Newspaper and Radio and Television Station.

== History ==
HTV2, a television channel, was launched on October 10, 2003, as an experimental broadcast on channel 30 UHF. It was accompanied by channels HTV1 and HTV3, and initially aired for nine hours a day. However, starting from November 1, 2003, HTV2 officially extended its broadcast hours to run from 6 am to 24 hours daily. The channel is owned by HTV.

During SEA Games 22, the majority of the tournament's competitions were broadcast on HTV2 channel, which played a crucial role in promoting the regional congress held in Vietnam for the first time. The extensive coverage of the games on HTV2 channel helped in spreading awareness and generating excitement about the event throughout Southeast Asia.

Tournaments are streamed by HTV2, along with HTV7 and HTV9, including the traditional Golden Racquet table tennis tournament, Southeast Asia Challenger soccer, V-League soccer, Spanish La Liga soccer, Serie A Italian soccer, World Cup soccer, badminton, volleyball, swimming, Grand Slam tennis, MotoGP European motorcycle racing, AFF Suzuki Cup, and the ASIAD.

Since 2006, Ho Chi Minh City Television has followed a socialization policy for its broadcasting channels. As part of this policy, HTV2 has collaborated with Anh Binh Minh Media, an international company owned by Dat Viet Group, to produce and broadcast programs on the channel jointly. This partnership has allowed HTV2 to expand its content offerings, including entertainment programs, live events, music, and movies. Additionally, HTV2 has taken on the role of broadcasting movies and game shows from HTV9 and HTV7 while continuing to provide regular coverage of sports matches. This collaboration has enriched the programming of HTV2 and provided a diverse range of content for its viewers.

Following several years of development and collaboration with Anh Binh Minh Company, Ho Chi Minh City Television Station, and Anh Binh Minh Company, which is part of Dat Viet Media Complex, joined forces to enhance the program infrastructure and improve the broadcasting quality of HTV2. As a result, HTV2 underwent a significant transformation and became a "2 in 1" TV channel. This means that it broadcasts sports content and features entertainment programs, operating 24/7 starting from May 5, 2008. Initially, the channel tested this format with a slide show from 7 pm to 11 pm, including the rebroadcasting of feature films and game shows from HTV9 and HTV7. However, live coverage of major sports events such as the World Cup, Euro, Olympics, and English Premier League matches remained a prominent feature of HTV2's programming.

HTV2 underwent several changes in its programming direction over the years. By August 24, 2009, the Department of News and Communication of Ho Chi Minh City required a licensing procedure to transfer the channel's content. As a result, HTV2 transitioned back to being a sports channel, focusing on sports-related programs. During this period, HTV2 gained popularity among sports fans, particularly soccer enthusiasts, with its special sports-related shows and coverage.

However, on October 16, 2010, HTV2 officially returned as a general entertainment channel after obtaining the necessary license from the Department of Information and Media. This allowed HTV2 to broaden its content and cater to a wider audience. In 2018, HTV entered into a partnership with Vie Channel company to further develop its brand identity, resulting in the rebranding of HTV2 as Vie Channel – HTV2. This collaboration aimed to enhance the channel's uniqueness and strengthen its position in the entertainment industry.

On 2022, the Vie Channel - HTV2 YouTube channel reached 10 million subscribers, becoming the first television channel's social media channel in Vietnam to receive a YouTube Diamond Play Button.

On January 16, 2023, the name "Vie Channel" was temporarily removed from the branding of the channel HTV2 to ensure compliance with the Press Law.

On January 1, 2024, Vie Channel added the "Vie Channel" brand back to HTV2.

== See also ==
- Vie Channel
- ON-Vie Giải Trí
- ON-Vie Dramas
- DatVietVAC
