= 13th Vietnam Film Festival =

Liên hoan phim Việt Nam lần thứ 13 (13th Vietnam Film Festival)
- Location: Vinh, Vietnam
- Founded: 1970
- Awards: Golden Lotus: Đời cát (Feature); Mùa ổi (Feature); 301 (Direct-to-Video Feature); Chị Năm "khùng" (Documentary); Di chúc của những oan hồn (Documentary); Xe đạp (Animated); Sự tích cái nhà sàn (Animated)
- Festival date: December 6 - December 9, 2001
- Website: 13th Vietnam Film Festival

Vietnam Film Festival chronology
- 14th 12th

The 13th Vietnam Film Festival was held from December 6 to December 9, 2001 in Vinh City, Nghệ An Province, Vietnam, with the slogan: "For an advanced Vietnam cinema imbued with national identity" (Vietnamese: "Vì một nền điện ảnh Việt Nam tiên tiến, đậm đà bản sắc dân tộc").

== Event ==
This year, in the Feature Film section, there is a fierce competition between the works of veteran directors and the next generation. In the end, 7 Golden Lotuses were awarded for the following categories: Feature Film (2 films), Direct-to-Video Feature Film (1 film), Documentary Film (2 films), Animated Film (2 films).

=== Participation ===
There were 105 films in attendance at the Film Festival: 12 feature films, 22 direct-to-video feature films, 15 documentary feature, 42 direct-to-video documentary and 14 animated films. At the Documentary Feature section, there is just a competition between two units: The Central Documentary and Science Film Studio (DSF) and People's Army Cinema. In the Animatied film section, it is almost just an internal review conference for the Vietnam Animation Studio, the only unit in the country that still produces this type of film.

=== Activities ===
The exchanges between artists and audiences in Vinh were very exciting. They were as enthusiastic as going to a sport. Especially in the exchange with students of Pedagogical University of Vinh, many students had to squeeze together to enter the hall and there were many questions sent to the artists.

=== Inadequacy ===
Direct-to-video feature films outnumber feature films, making the festival feel like an expansive television festival. This is a situation that has continued since the 1990s and shows no sign of getting better. Most of the audience only remembers the feature films that are broadcast on television and the actors who act in TV series, because it has been a long time since many people have had the opportunity to watch a feature film.

== Official Selection ==
=== Feature film ===
Original title	English title	Director(s)	Production
Ba người đàn ông	Three Men	Trần Ngọc Phong	Giải Phóng Film
Bến không chồng	Wharf of Widows	Lưu Trọng Ninh	VFS
Chiếc chìa khóa vàng	The Golden Key	Lê Hoàng	Giải Phóng Film
Chiếc hộp gia bảo	The Heirloom Box	Hữu Mười	VFS
Dưới tán rừng lặng lẽ	Quiet in the Woods	Nguyễn Quang	Feature Film Studio I
Đời cát	Sandy Lives	Nguyễn Thanh Vân	VFS
Hai Bình làm thuỷ điện		Trần Lực	VFS
Khoảnh khắc chiến tranh	The War Moment	Trần Phi	People's Army Cinema
Mặt trận không tiếng súng		Lê Dân, Bùi Đình Thứ	Giải Phóng Film
Mùa ổi	The Guava House	Đặng Nhật Minh	Youth Film Studio, Les Films d'ici
Thung lũng hoang vắng	The Deserted Valley	Phạm Nhuệ Giang	VFS
Vào Nam ra Bắc	Down South Up North	Phi Tiến Sơn	Feature Film Studio I

Highlighted title indicates Golden Lotus winner.

== Awards ==
=== Feature film ===
Award		Winner
Film	Golden Lotus	Đời cát Mùa ổi
Film	Silver Lotus	Thung lũng hoang vắng Bến không chồng
Film	Grand Jury Prize	Vào Nam ra Bắc; Ba người đàn ông
Best Director		Nguyễn Thanh Vân – Đời cát
Best Actor		Bùi Bài Bình – Mùa ổi
Best Actress		Hồng Ánh – Đời cát, Thung lũng hoang vắng
Best Supporting Actor		not awarded
Best Supporting Actress		Đỗ Nguyễn Lan Hà – Đời cát Bảo Thanh (Note: Went by the birth name Vũ Phương Thanh) – Vào Nam ra Bắc
Best Screenplay		Nguyễn Quang Lập – Đời cát, Thung lũng hoang vắng
Best Cinematography		Lý Thái Dũng – Thung lũng hoang vắng Vũ Đức Tùng – Mùa ổi
Best Art Design		Phạm Nguyên Cẩn – Chiếc chìa khóa vàng
Best Original Score		Đặng Hữu Phúc – Mùa ổi

==== Direct-to-video ====
Award		Winner
Film	Golden Lotus	301
Film	Silver Lotus	Gấu cổ trắng Họ mãi là đồng đội
Best Director		Nguyễn Khải Hưng – 301
Best Actor		Hoàng Phi – Gấu cổ trắng
Best Actress		Diễm Lộc – Nắng chiều
Best Supporting Actor		not awarded
Best Supporting Actress		Hoài Trang – Giã từ cát bụi
Best Screenplay		Gia Vũ – Gấu cổ trắng
Best Cinematography		Cao Thành Danh – 5 W trong 1, Cánh buồm ảo ảnh Lê Quang Hưng – Họ mãi là đồng đội
Best Original Score		Đặng Hữu Phúc – Nắng chiều Bảo Phúc – Giã từ cát bụi

=== Documentary/Science film ===
Award		Winner
Film	Golden Lotus	Chị Năm "khùng" Di chúc của những oan hồn
Film	Silver Lotus	Người anh cả của quân đội Cao nguyên đá Cuộc không chiến lịch sử
Film	Grand Jury Prize	Một thế kỷ - Một đời người
Best Director		Văn Lê – Di chúc của những oan hồn
Best Screenplay		Đào Trọng Khánh – Một thế kỷ - Một đời người
Best Cinematography		Nguyễn Như Vũ – Cao nguyên đá Nguyễn Văn Hướng – Điệu múa cổ
Best Sound Design		Lê Huy Hòa – Điệu múa cổ, Chị Năm "khùng", Cao nguyên đá, Chốn quê

=== Animated film ===
Award		Winner
Film	Golden Lotus	Xe đạp Sự tích cái nhà sàn
Film	Silver Lotus	Sự tích rước đèn Trung thu
Best Director		Nguyễn Phương Hoa – Xe đạp
Best Screenplay		Phạm Sông Đông – Xe đạp
Best Cinematography		Thủy Hằng – Sự tích cái nhà sàn
Best Shaping Animator		Nguyễn Hà Bắc – Sự tích cái nhà sàn Lý Thu Hà – Sự tích rước đèn Trung thu
Best Acting Animator		Hoàng Lộc – Xe đạp
Best Original Score		Đỗ Hồng Quân – Sự tích rước đèn Trung thu
