= Wharf of Widows =

- DVD cover
- Vietnamese: Bến không chồng
- Directed by: Lưu Trọng Ninh
- Written by: Lưu Trọng Văn
- Based on: Wharf of Widows by Dương Hướng
- Starring: Thúy Hà; Minh Châu; Như Quỳnh; Lưu Trọng Ninh
- Narrated by: Lưu Trọng Ninh
- Cinematography: Nguyễn Hữu Tuấn
- Edited by: Lê Vinh Quốc
- Music by: Đỗ Hồng Quân
- Production company: Vietnam Feature Film Studio
- Distributed by: Phuong Nam Film
- Release date: 2001
- Running time: 90 minutes
- Country: Vietnam
- Language: Vietnamese

Wharf of Widows (Vietnamese: Bến không chồng, German: Das Ufer der Frauen ohne Männer) is a 2001 Vietnamese drama film directed by Lưu Trọng Ninh, starring Lưu, Thúy Hà, Minh Châu and Như Quỳnh. It was adapted from the novel of the same name by Vietnamese writer Dương Hướng. The film had its world premiere in the Forum section at the 51st Berlin International Film Festival in 2001, where it was awarded NETPAC Award - Special Mention. At the 13th Vietnam Film Festival held in December 2001, the film won the Silver Lotus Award.

== Cast ==
- Thúy Hà as Hạnh
- Minh Châu as Nhân
- Như Quỳnh as Hơn
- Lưu Trọng Ninh as Vạn
