= List of VTV dramas broadcast in 1998 =

This is a list of VTV dramas released in 1998.

←1997 - 1998 - 1999→

== VTV Tet dramas ==
These films were released on VTV channel during Tet holiday. In this time, all of the channels were merged with a single broadcast schedule.

Broadcast	Title	Eps.	Prod.	Cast and crew	Theme song(s)	Genre	Notes
27 Jan	Đêm hội làng năm ấy (Village Festival Night That Year)	1 (55′)	VTV Film Prod.	Trần Quốc Trọng (director); Thùy Linh, Phạm Ngọc Tiến (writer); Tuấn Anh, Ngô Cừ, Diễm Lộc, Thái Hà, Phát Triệu, Thạch Hãn, Hoàng Khiêm, Ngọc Quốc, Mạnh Sinh, Đức An, Trung Trung Đỉnh, Nguyễn Quang Lập, Phạm Ngọc Tiến, Phạm Xuân Nguyên, Trần Quốc Trọng, Thùy Dương, Tùng Dương, Thúy Hiền, Nguyễn Danh Dũng...		Drama, Rural	Airs 21:20, 29th Tet holiday. Adapted from short story of the same name by Lý Khắc Cung.
28 Jan	Đón khách (Welcome Guests)	1 (82′)		Đỗ Minh Tuấn (director); Lê Ngọc Minh, Đỗ Minh Tuấn (writers); Trịnh Mai, Tiến Đạt, Nguyễn Ánh, Chí Trung, Dương Quảng, Mạnh Sinh, Bình Hải, Mai Châu, Thanh Thúy, Điền Viên, Trần Đức, Minh Phương, Huy Thịnh, Kim Oanh, Hồ Liên, Diệp Bích, Minh Tâm, Thu An, Thanh An, Huệ Đàn, Linh Nga, Ngô Đức Hiếu...		Comedy	Airs 17:00, 1st Tet holiday
29 Jan	Đêm ấy có người ra đi (That Night Someone Went Away)	1 (70′)	VTV Film Prod.	Trọng Liên (director); Phan Chí Thành, Trần Danh (writers); Tú Oanh, Hồng Tuấn, Kim Thoa, Ngọc Bích, Thùy Giang, Vũ Tăng, Hương Anh, Công Bẩy, Hồng Quân, Hồ Phong, Cao Thiên, Huy Phúc, Mạnh Kiểm, Bích Phượng, Ngọc Chi, Minh Thanh...		Drama, Romance	Airs 16:35, 2nd Tet holiday. Based on Hoàng Trọng Cường's short story of the same name.
29 Jan	Sân tranh (Yard of Paintings)	1 (70′)	VTV Film Prod.	Trọng Trinh (director); Thùy Linh (writer); Ngọc Quốc, Ngọc Tản, Đức Long, Văn Toàn, Tuyết Liên, Văn Tùng, Trọng Sơn Tùng, Anh Tuấn, Vũ Mai Huê, Lan Minh, Tiến Dũng, Phát Triệu, Nguyễn Cự, Minh Tuấn, Hoàng Nhuận Cầm...		Drama	Airs 22:10, 2nd Tet holiday. Adapted from short story of the same name by Nguyễn Phan Hách.
30 Jan	Hương quê (Scent of the Homeland)	1	VTV Film Prod.	Vi Hòa (director); Thu Hải, Hữu Độ, Trần Đức, Xuân Tùng, Hồng Giang, Đức Khuê, Vân Dung, Thanh Tùng, Sùng Thị Nga, Hoàng Hà, Quang Nguyên, Minh Gái, Hồng Khiêm, Hữu Thiện, Ngọc Thắng...	'Hương quê' theme song by Tuyết Tuyết	Drama, Rural	Airs 13:05, 3rd Tet holiday

== VTV1 Unstable time slot on Friday night for Vietnamese dramas ==
Following the previous year, the Friday night (around 21:00) on VTV1 was spent to air Vietnamese films more often than the other time slots but it was unstable. It sometimes was used as an extension for foreign drama time slots. In some other cases, the broadcast schedule for several Vietnamese dramas was expanded to non-Fridays. The list below includes some of the films that did not air on Fridays.

- Note: The time slot was delayed from 12 Jun to 3 Jul due to the broadcast schedule for 1998 FIFA World Cup.

Broadcast	Title	Eps.	Prod.	Cast and crew	Theme song(s)	Genre	Notes
2-9 Jan; Fri/Fri	Cầu vồng đi đón cơn mưa (Rainbow Goes Catch the Rain)	2 (75′)	VTV Film Prod.	Vũ Trường Khoa (director); Nguyễn Đỗ Phú (writer); Phạm Cường, Mai Thu Huyền, Thanh Hiền, Bá Cường, Trần Nhượng, Bá Anh, Sỹ Tiến, Thu Hải, Ngọc Dung, Ngọc Bảo, Kim Thơ, Huyền Thanh, Diễm Lộc, Kim Thoa, Tiến Quang...		Drama, Romance	
16 Jan; Fri	Người trên núi (The One from the Mountain)	1 (70′)	VTV Film Prod.	Nguyễn Hữu Phần (director & writer); Khánh Huyền, Thanh Du, Đức Quỳnh, Bích Thủy, Phi Tuấn, Thu Hải, Minh Hương, Tùng Bắc, Hạ Tám, Thu Thảo, Huyền Trang, La Hùng, Thu Hà...	Trăng trối (Last Will); Composed by Vũ Thảo & Nguyễn Hữu Phần	Drama, Ethnic	
23 Jan; Fri	Người kéo vó bè (The One Who Pulls the Lift Net)	1	VTV Film Prod.	Trần Quốc Trọng (director); Đặng Minh Châu (writer); Trang Anh, Lê Thị Hà, Công Lý, Hồng Điệp, Kim Thoa, Quang Thiện, Graham Nind, Lan Hương...		Drama	
25 Jan; Sun	Hạnh phúc trần gian (Earthly Happiness)	1 (75′)	VTV and TĐN	Lê Ngọc Linh (director and writer); Thanh Bình, Hoàng Hải, Lê Nga, Quang Châu, Lan Phương, Martin Rondeau, Hội An, Quang Kỳ, Văn Sơn, Đăng Khoa, My My, Trung Lễ, Minh Hoàng...		Drama	Based on Từ Nguyên Tĩnh's short story of the same name
2 Feb; Mon	Followed by the playback of 1996 feature film Tổ quốc tiếng gà trưa (Fatherland in the Rooster Sound).						
6 Feb; Fri	Đò chiều (Ferry an Afternoon)	1		Tùng Dương...		Drama	
13-15 Feb; Fri-Sun	Bến lục bình (Hyacinth Wharf)	2	VTV Film Prod.	Lê Cường Việt, Châu Minh Xuyến (directors); Hồ Nhân (writer); Đặng Ci Mi, Nguyễn Hoàng, Quốc Cường, Kim Anh, Diễm Kiều, Mai Thanh, Như Phúc, Phương Bằng, Hoàng Yến...		Drama	
20 Feb; Fri	Những điều còn mất (What Remained What Lost)	1 (110′)		Phạm Đông (director & writer); Thanh Dương, Vị Thúy, Thanh Thoa, Tuấn Bình, Hoàng Yến, Huy Toàn, Duy Hải, Kim Thoa...		Drama	Adapted from Phạm Đình Trọng's short story 'Ngõ nhỏ'
1 Mar; Sun	Người về sông Thương (Thương River Where We're Back)	1 (79′)	VTV Film Prod.	Nguyễn Hinh Anh (director); Trung Trung Đỉnh (writer); Hồng Sơn, Diệu Thuần, Tú Oanh, Thanh An, Bích Liên, Kim Thoa...		Drama, Post-war	Adapted from Trịnh Đình Khôi's short story 'Vết thương chưa lành'
6 Mar; Fri	Ngôi sao xanh nhấp nháy (Flash Green Star)	1	VTV Film Prod.	Vũ Hồng Sơn (director); Nguyễn Thu Dung (writer); Khánh Huyền, Trung Hiếu, Đức Sơn, Bùi Thúy Hằng, Ngân Hoa, Thu Nga...		Drama	
10 Mar-26 May; 10-20 Mar: Tue-Thu-Fri; 24 Mar-26 May: Tue-Thu	Gió qua miền tối sáng (Wind Through the Dark and Light)	30 (30′)	VTV Film Prod.	Phạm Thanh Phong (director); Lê Phương, Nguyễn Mạnh Tuấn, Mường Mán (writers); Lê Tuấn Anh, Minh Hoà, Linh Huệ, Trần Ngọc Quốc, Phương Thanh, Trọng Trinh, Hồng Chương, Phát Triệu, Phan Ngọc Lan, Minh Đức, Đinh Thơ, Ngân Hoa, Lương Hữu Đại, Thanh Thủy, Thanh Tùng, Thu Hiền, Hà Anh, Hoàng Dũng, Vũ Tăng, Văn Toản, Quyền Linh, Yến Vy, Thu Hiền, Thanh Chi...	Bão giông (Thunderstorms); Composed by Vũ Thảo; Performed by Quang Huy	Drama, Marriage, Family, Crime	First VTV drama to be synchronized recording. 10-20 Mar: 2 eps on Fri; 24 Mar-7 May: delayed on 28-30 Apr; 12-26 May: 2 eps/night, ep 25-26 moved from Tue, 19 May to Mon 18 May due to HCM's Birthday Celebration.
15 Mar; Sun	Followed by the playback of Chim phóng sinh (Birds to Set Free). The drama was first released on HTV7 earlier in 1998.						
27 Mar; Fri	Bên dòng Hoàng Long (By the River of Hoàng Long)	1 (80′)	VTV Film Prod.	Trần Vịnh (director); Bành Mai Phương (writer); Lê Vi, Trung Hiếu, Thu Nguyệt, Thành An, Trần Thu Hương, Vân Anh, Hồng Vân, Thu Hương, Quang Thập, Lâm Bình, Thu Hiền, Hoàng Chiến, Hương Dung, Lý Thanh Kha, Quang Linh...		Drama	Adapted from Sương Nguyệt Minh's short story 'Người bên sông Châu'
3-10 Apr; Fri/Fri	Thầy và trò (A Teacher and His Students)	2 (72′)	VTV Film Prod.	Đặng Phi (director); Hương Trà, Đặng Diệu Hương (writers); Dũng Nhi, Thanh Lê, Phạm Tần, Đức Sơn, Kim Thu, Vĩnh Xương, Anh Tuấn, Thu Hường, Minh Huyền, Đặng Tất Bình, Trọng Phan, Hồng Khuyên, Tùng Lâm, Tự Do, Vân Anh, Thu Ngà, Hồng Phúc, Ngọc Anh, Mai Lan, Thu Hường, grade 8 students from Hoàng Diệu middle school and the youths of the Xa mẹ newspaper selling group,...	KEEP ON DREAMING by Urara Takano, Megumi Hayashibara, Yuri Amano, Bin Shimada and Akemi Shinohara	Scholastic, Slice-of-Life, Children, Drama	
15-20 Apr; Wed-Mon	Duyên đời (Predestined Life)	3				Drama	
17 Apr; Fri	Dời nhà lên phố (Moving to Downtown)	1 (70′)	VTV Film Prod.	Nguyễn Danh Dũng (director); Nguyễn Quang Vinh (writer); Quang Thiện, Diệu Thuần, Thanh Hưng, Thanh Hà, Hữu Độ, Hồng Giang, Ngân An, Huệ Đàn, Đức Sơn, Phạm Bằng, Ngọc Tản, Lý Hậu, Tú Lan, Trần Tùng, Trịnh Mai Nguyên...	'Dời nhà lên phố' theme song Composed by Vũ Thảo	Drama, Slice-of-Life, Family	Adapted from short story of the same name by Nguyễn Quốc Trung
24 Apr-4 May; Fri/Fri/Mon	Câu chuyện xóm chèo (Story at a Chèo Hamlet)	3		Tạ Minh Thảo		Drama	
27-29 Apr; Mon-Wed	Followed by the playback of two-part feature film franchise Vĩ tuyến 17 ngày và đêm (Parallel 17: Days and Nights) to celebrate the Reunification Day. The films was released in 1972.						
30 Apr; Thu	Ước mơ của má (Mother's Wish)	1				Drama, War, Family	
15-22 May; Fri/Fri	Những chặng đường đời (Stages of Life)	2				Drama	
29 May; Fri	Ghen (Jealous)	1 (85′)	VTV Film Prod.	Phạm Thanh Phong (director & writer); Quốc Khánh, Minh Hằng, Chí Trung, Lê Tuấn Phong, Thu An, Hồng Chương, Phương Tâm, Đức Sơn, Đình Chiến...		Comedy, Marriage, Romance	Adapted from short story of the same name by Khánh Hoài
5 Jun; Fri	Gió ngàn đưa chân (Mountain Wind Leads the Way)	1 (73′)	VTV Film Prod.	Mạc Văn Chung (director); Mai Đức (writer); Mai Huê, Công Lý, Lâm Tùng, Thúy Ngần, Lan Minh, Bá Cường, Lê Tuấn, Tiến Quang, Minh Khôi, Phương Tâm...		Drama, Post-war	
9 Jun; Tue	U Thỏn (Mother Thỏn)	1 (75′)	VTV Film Prod.	Lê Tuấn Anh (director); Đoàn Quốc Thắng (writer); Xuân Thức, Lan Hương 'Bông', Ngọc Dung, Trọng Trinh, Hà Anh, Khánh Việt, Huy Phúc, Đức Mạnh, Ngọc Tản, Lan Minh, Hồng Điệp, Bá Cường, Đàm Ngọc Quang, Anh Túc, Mai Lan...	'U Thỏn' theme song Composed by Vũ Thảo	Drama, War, Rural	Adapted from short story of the same name by Trần Thanh Hà
10-24 Jul; Fri/Fri/Fri	Hoa đất Mường (The Flower of Mường Land)	3		Triệu Ba (director); Thu Quế, Quan Tuấn, Thanh Hiền...		Drama, Ethnic	
14 Aug-2 Sep; Fri/Tue-Wed/ Tue/Tue-Wed	Followed by Những nẻo đường phù sa (The Alluvial Roads), episode 11 to episode 16. *Note: Delayed 1 ep on Wednesday, 26 Aug due to the broadcast schedule for Tiger Cup 1998						
3-4 Sep; Thu-Fri	Nguyên quán (Origin)	2				Drama	
2 Oct-4 Nov; Fri/Tue-Wed-Fri/ Tue-Wed-Thu-Fri/ Tue-Thu-Fri/ Tue-Thu-Fri/Wed	Bình minh châu thổ (Delta Dawn)	15	Tây Đô Film Prod.	Châu Huế, Trần Ngọc Phong (directors); Nguyễn Khắc Phục (writer); Diệp Lang, Mai Huỳnh, Mạnh Dung, Trọng Phan, Kim Khánh, Tấn Thành, Ngọc Phong, Phương Điền, Mỹ Duyên, Diễm My, Huỳnh Thu Nga, Trần Lượng, Minh Trị, Huỳnh Anh Tuấn...	Lời ru của đất (Lullaby of the Land) by Bích Phượng	Drama, Family, Slice-of-Life	First released on CTV channel
6 Nov; Fri	Chân dung biển (Portrait of the Sea)	1 (75′)	VTV Film Prod. and KTV	Nguyễn Khải Hưng (director); Mai Đức (writer); Minh Châu, Mai Huỳnh, Đình Thơ, Chấn Cường, Như Hạnh, Ái Huy, Kim Tuyến, Anh Đào, Thúy Vi, Vi Thảo...	My Heart Will Go On by Celine Dion	Drama, SLice-of-Life, Psycho logical	
13 Nov; Fri	Một lời nói thật (An Honest Word)	1 (90′)	VTV Film Prod.	Nguyễn Hữu Phần (director); Nguyễn Hoàng (writer); Khánh Huyền, Phạm Cường, Phú Thăng, Bích Huyền, Đức Sơn, Minh Hiếu, Tùng Dương, Ngọc Thanh, Hồng Hải, Thanh Huyền, Hoàng Nhuận Cầm, Đoàn Đình Trung...		Drama	
19-20 Nov; Thu-Fri	Nhịp cầu hạnh phúc (Bridge for Happiness)	5 (30′)	VTV Film Prod.	Nguyễn Hữu Phần, Phạm Thanh Phong (directors); Thanh Hữu Nhuận (writer); Trịnh Thịnh, Minh Vượng, Văn Hiệp, Kim Xuyến, Quốc Khánh, Nguyệt Hằng, Minh Tuấn...		Drama	
23 Nov; Mon	Followed by the playback of Dương tính (Positive). The drama was first released 9 months ago in Sunday Literature & Art.						
27 Nov; Fri	Followed by the playback of Sân tranh (Yard of Paintings). The drama was first released in 1998 Tet holiday.						
30 Nov; Mon	Người giúp việc (The Helpmeet)	1 (76′)	VTV Film Prod.	Đỗ Chí Hướng (director); Đỗ Hồng Ngọc (writer); Thu An, Phú Thăng, Thúy Hằng, Đình Chiến, Lê Mai, Tuyết Mai, Đức Anh, Hồng Ngọc...		Drama, Slice-of-Life, Family	Adapted from Ma Văn Kháng's short story of the same name
4 Dec; Fri	Tiếng sáo thời gian (Flute Sound of Time)	1		Tạ Ngọc Bảo...		Drama	
7-11 Dec; Mon-Fri	Followed by the playback of Giai điệu trắng (White Melody). The drama was first released 7 months ago in For The First Time On VTV3 Screen.						
18 Dec; Fri	Công tử Bạc Liêu (Bạc Liêu Dandy)	1 (92′)	Tây Đô Film Prod.	Xuân Cường (director); Lương Minh Hinh (writer); Lê Tuấn Anh, Việt Trinh, Huỳnh Anh Tuấn, Công Hậu, Phượng Trung, Diệp Lang, Mỹ Khanh, Võ Thế Vĩ, Lê Chánh, Hương Giang, Long Hải, Đức Hiền, Lê Khanh, Sandra, Thạch Ngà, Đặng Minh Quang, Kiều Oanh, Việt Thanh, Mạc Can, Linh San, Văn Ngà, Thế Vân, Yên Sơn, Kim Dung, Ngọc Bích, Kim Chi, Ngọc Diễm...		Drama, Biography, Period	First released on CTV channel
25 Dec; Fri	Followed by the playback of Ký ức một thời (Memories of a Time). The drama was first released on VTV1 in Dec 1997.						
31 Dec 1998- 3 Feb 1999	Followed by Những nẻo đường phù sa (The Alluvial Roads), episode 17 to episode 23. *Broadcast: Thu-Fri/Fri/Fri/ Fri/Fri/Wed						

== For The First Time On VTV3 Screen dramas ==
These dramas were aired under the name of the program For The First Time On VTV3 Screen (Vietnamese: Lần đầu tiên trên màn ảnh VTV3).

Since 31 Mar, the program was moved from Wednesday late afternoon time slot to Tuesday night time slot (around 21:15).

Broadcast	Title	Eps.	Prod.	Cast and crew	Theme song(s)	Genre	Notes
7 Jan	Lạc dòng (Lost the Stream)	1 (80′)	VTV's Literature & Art Committee	Trần Trung Nhàn (director); Bùi Duy Đông (writer); Phạm Hồng Minh, Hoàng Lan, An Qúy, Lê Ngọc Dung, Lê Anh Tuấn, Vũ Phạm Tú, Văn Thanh, Thu An, Tuyết Liên...		Drama	
14 Jan	Chuyện của Hạ (Hạ's Story)	1				Drama	
21 Jan-4 Feb	Người Hoa Lư (People of Hoa Lư)	2	VTV Film Prod.	Nguyễn Hữu Phần (director & writer); Đức Sơn, Thanh Du, Hồng Vân, Huyền Trang, Hồng Quyên, Đức Vương, Đức Hội, Lý Thanh Kha, Quang Thập...		Drama, Period	Delayed 1 ep due to Tet holiday
11 Feb	Cung đàn cuộc sống (Instrument of Life)	1	VTV Film Prod.	Vũ Trường Khoa (director); Hà Linh (writer); Trần Thạch, Thu Hiền, Minh Tuấn, Ngọc Thu, Hữu Độ, Hồng Đức, Hương Dung, Thu An, Ngọc Bích...		Drama	
18-25 Feb	Bạn cùng lớp (Classmate)	2	VTV's Literature & Art Committee	Đoàn Trúc Quỳnh (writer); Chính Lâm, Hương An, Trần Hạnh, Kim Thoa, Tùng Lâm, Thanh Hòa, Tuấn Long, Danh Nhân, Ngọc Bích, Nguyễn Thường, Thu Hương, Tuyết Mai, Minh Quân...		Scholastic, Children, Drama	
4-18 Mar	Nga	3	VTV's Literature & Art Committee	Trần Danh (writer); Minh Nguyệt, Minh Thảo, Hồng Kiên, Kim Thoa, Ngô Thị Nhâm, Quỳnh Hoa, Kiều Oanh, Thu Hoàn, Văn Thản, Thu Mai, Đức Quang, Thu Hường, Trung Hiếu, Đức Ngân, Đức Tống, Mạnh Hồng...		Drama	
25-31 Mar	Hình bóng cuộc đời (Silhouette of Life)	2	VTV Film Prod.	Đặng Lưu Việt Bảo (director); Thuận Châu (writer); Bùi Bài Bình, Xuân Tùng, Mai Châu, Hoàng Cúc, Vân Anh, Nguyệt Thanh, Thu Hương, Khánh Ly, Huy Thông, Tuấn Anh, Nguyễn Thị Lam, Gia Ninh, Dr. Hoàng Kim Phụng, Tố Quyên, Minh Chiêm, Minh Huệ, Nguyễn Thị Lịch, students and teachers of Lâm Thao chemical technology school...	Step by Step by Yumiko Takahashi	Drama, Family, Rural	Moved to Tuesday night since Ep 2
7 Apr	Sa ngã (Fallen)	1 (87′)	VFS and VTV	Nguyễn Anh Dũng (director); Đặng Minh Liên (writer); Vĩnh Xương, Việt Chung, Hoàng Quân, Diệu Thuần, Quốc Thanh, Thanh Chi, Chu Hùng, Tuyết Mai, Phú Đôn, Kim Thoa, Kiều Minh Hiếu, Hồng Hải, Ngọc Thoa, Mai Hương, Tấn Long, Thanh Tùng, Hoàng Hà, Quốc Trung, Văn Thành...		Drama, Scholastic, Crime	
14 Apr	Chuyện của làng ven sông (Riverside Village Story)	1	VTV Film Prod.	Ngọc Bích, Lê Hương Thảo...		Drama, Rural	
21-28 Apr	Chuyện tình của tôi (My Love Story)	2 (70′)		Xuân Sơn (director); Lê Ngọc Minh (writer); Quốc Tuấn, Minh Phương, Minh Hằng, Ngọc Quốc, Ngọc Thoa, Đăng Khoa, Thanh Hiền, Cát Trần Tùng, Bảo Phúc, Đinh Hoài Giang, Trần Tiệp, Minh Phương, Mạnh Sinh, Thành Hoa, Phương Loan, Cẩm Hạt...		Drama, Romance	
5-12 May	Giai điệu trắng (White Melody)	2				Drama	
19 May	Followed by the playback of the 1997 feature film Hà Nội mùa đông năm 46 (Hà Nội Winter '46) to celebrate Leader Hồ Chí Minh's Birthday.						
26 May-2 Jun	Những nhánh cây đời (Branches of Life Tree)	2 (80′)	VTV's Literature & Art Committee	Đới Xuân Việt, Nguyễn Hữu Ứng (directors); Đoàn Tuấn (writer); Hoa Thúy, Trọng Trinh, Tuyết Mai, Ngân Hoa, Trung Anh, Lê Tuấn, Đới Hương Anh, Kim Oanh, Quốc Khánh, Trần Kiểm, Thúy Huyền...		Drama	
9 Jun	Hoa lộc vừng (Freshwater Mangrove Flowers)	1				Drama	
16-23 Jun	Thành phố hình trăng khuyết (Crescent City)	2		Đoàn Trúc Quỳnh (writer)		Drama, Action	Adapted from Nguyễn Đức Huệ's novel of the same name
30 Jun-7 Jul	Chuyện nhà Mộc (Mr. Mộc's Family Story)	2 (80′)		Trần Lực (director); Đỗ Trí Hùng (writer); Hải Điệp, Nguyễn Hòa, Như Trang, Chí Nghĩa, Xuân Bắc, Trần Khôi, Ngọc Minh, Thanh Mạn, Đỗ Hòa Bình, Hồng Quân, Phạm Đức Huy, Quốc Tuấn, Trần Hoàng, Thanh Ngoan, Trần Đức, Kim Xuyến, Thu Hiền, Tuyết Liên, Thanh Lực, Kim Oanh, Hồng Nhung, Tố Uyên, Đức Hải, Thanh Chi, Ngô Minh, Sĩ Lành, Xuân Đuống...	Cô Tấm ngày nay (Latter-day Miss Tấm) by Khánh Linh	Family, Comedy, Romance, Rural	
14 Jul	Gặp lại ở phố ga (See You On the Station Street)	1		Đoàn Trúc Quỳnh (writer)		Drama	Adapted from short story of the same name
21 Jul	Lời hẹn ngày ra trận (The Promise Before the Battle)	1 (80′)	Army Cinema Prod. and VTV	Nguyễn Hữu Phần (director); Nguyễn Thu Dung (writer); Hoàng Lan, Vĩnh Xương, Tuấn Quang, Phát Triệu, Tuyết Liên, Kim Thoa, Hồng Tuấn, Duy Mẫn, Mạnh Toàn, Quốc Trị, Văn Tuấn, Ngọc Huyền, Hữu Trọng, Đỗ Hoài Nam, Việt Anh, Hồng Gấm, Nguyễn Vân, Nguyễn Thị Thơm...	Lời hẹn (The Promise) by Thanh Hoa	Drama, War, Romance	
28 Jul-4 Aug	Người cha nhu nhược (A Feckless Father)	2		Phi Tiến Sơn (director); Quốc Tuấn...		Drama, Family	
11-18 Aug	Followed by the playback of Giai điệu quê hương (Homeland Melody) to celebrate the August Revolution. The drama was first released earlier on BTV1 channel.						
25 Aug-1 Sep	Sau lũy tre làng (Behind the Bamboo Fence)	2 (85′)		Vũ Phạm Từ (director); Đoàn Trúc Quỳnh (writer); Trần Hạnh, Ngọc Thoa, Thương An, Việt Thắng, Minh Tuấn, Anh Quân, Ngọc Anh, Huyền Thanh, Ngọc Thư, Ngọc Tản, Nam Cường, Bùi Sinh, Đức Mẫn, Đình Thực, Mai Hiên, Ngọc Diệp, Đức Cường, Trung Kiên...		Rural, Drama	Adapted from the novel of 'Đất mẹ' by Tạ Bảo
8 Sep	Mưa bóng mây (Sun Shower)	1				Drama	
15 Sep	Chuyện đời (Life Story)	1				Drama, Slice-of-Life	
22-29 Sep	Chị Châu (Ms. Châu)	2				Drama	
6-20 Oct	Bỏ vợ (Leaving the Wife)	3		Bùi Thạc Chuyên (director); Phú Đôn, Đức Khuê, Nguyệt Hằng...		Comedy, Marriage	
27 Oct-1 Dec	Của để dành (Asset of the Mother)	6 (80′)	VTV Film Prod.	Đỗ Thanh Hải (director); Nguyễn Thị Thu Huệ (writer); Hoàng Yến, Anh Tú, Hồng Tuấn, Thu Hường, Quách Thu Phương, Mai Châu, Hoàng Dũng, Phát Triệu, Đức Hải, Đào Thị Loan, Thùy Giang, Hương Mai, Dũng Nhi, Huyền Thanh, Kim Xuyến, Kim Oanh, Thu Hải, Tuấn Quang, Mạnh Quân, Tiến Quang, Trần Khánh, Sỹ Tiến, Hoàng Điệp, Quang Trung, Tuấn Dương, Quốc Khánh, Hoa Thúy, Thu Hương, Thanh Dương, Trần Cường, Hoàng Thu, Kim Thoa, Lan Phượng, Tự Do, Hồ Đức, Trần Mai, Quý Dương, Anh Tuấn, Thu An, Hồng Mai...	Lời ru cho con (Lullaby For Her Children) by Trần Thu Hà	Family, Drama, Slice-of-Life, Romance	Adapted from short story of the same name by Nguyễn Thị Thu Huệ
8-15 Dec	Những con đường vô hình (The Invisible Ways)	2 (70′)	VTV Film Prod.	Vũ Xuân Hưng (director & writer); Mai Thu Huyền, Mạnh Cường, Hoàng Phúc, Đinh Phương, Hương Ngọc Diễm, Nguyễn Đình Anh, Nguyễn Hữu Hiếu, Phạm Khánh, Nguyễn Đình San, Hà Kim Ngân, Nguyễn Hùng, Nguyễn Thanh Hóa, Phạm Ngọc Bích, Thanh Thúy, Nguyễn Long Giang, Trần Lê Hậu, Trịnh Hoàng Oanh, Vũ Ngọc Xuân An...		Drama, Romance, Business	
22-29 Dec	Không phải chuyện đùa (It's Not A Joke)	2 (75′)		Hữu Mười (director); Đỗ Trí Hùng (writer); Thúy Hà, Tuyết Liên, Vũ Anh Tuấn, Thanh Thúy, Hồ Liên, Bá Anh, Thanh Tùng, Hồng Quang, Đức Hiệp, Lê Anh Tuấn, Vân Anh, Thùy Dương, Thế Minh, Thư Trang, Ngọc Anh, Kim Bình, Ngọc Trung, Dương Thanh Hải, Trần Thị Minh, Nguyễn Văn Bình, Lưu Thanh Phương...		Drama, Scholastic	

== VTV3 Sunday Literature & Art dramas ==
These dramas air in early Sunday afternoon on VTV3 as a part of the program Sunday Literature & Art (Vietnamese: Văn nghệ Chủ Nhật).

Broadcast	Title	Eps.	Prod.	Cast and crew	Theme song(s)	Genre	Notes
4-25 Jan	Dòng trong dòng đục (Clear Current, Cloudy Current)	4 (70′)	VTV Film Prod.	Nguyễn Thế Hồng (director); Đỗ Trí Hùng, Nguyễn Thế Anh (writer); Trần Tiến, Trịnh Thịnh, Vũ Mai Huê, Nguyễn Thế Anh, Hạnh Đạt, Đức Thuận, Trần Đức, Minh Hằng, Thanh Vân, Thúy Ngần, Hoàng Bình, Minh Vượng, Văn Hiệp, Việt Thắng, Hồng Giang, Mai Hòa, Hà Anh, Tuyết Mai, Thanh Tùng, Thành Tuấn, Mạnh Hùng, Danh Nhân, Ngọc Toàn, Thế Sơn, Hoàng Tùng, Văn Phúc, Thu Hà, Trịnh Vân...	'Dòng trong dòng đục' theme song by Ngọc Anh 3A	Drama, Coming-of-Age, Crime	
1 Feb	Vĩ nhân rừng xanh (Great Man of Jungle)	1	VTV Film Prod.			Drama	
8 Feb	Người mài dao kéo (Knife Grinder)	1	VTV Film Prod.			Drama	
15 Feb	Dương tính (Positive)	1	VTV Film Prod.	Phạm Thanh Phong (director); Phạm Thanh Phong, Lê Tuấn Phong (writers); Lê Tuấn Phong, Vũ Mai Huê, Minh Hằng, Văn Tuấn, Công Thành, Lý Bá Vũ, Quế Phương, Trần Anh...		Drama	
22 Feb-22 Mar	Sóng gió đời người (Waves and Wind in Life)	5	VTV Film Prod.	Trọng Liên (director); Phạm Văn Quý, Trần Danh (writers); Nguyễn Huỳnh, Võ Sông Hương, Minh Tâm, Minh Đức, Trung Hiếu, Kim Thoa, Tuấn Dương, Lan Minh, Bá Cường, Lân Bích, Trương Minh Quốc Thái, Thu Hồng, Tam Anh, Tuyết Dung, Tuấn Hiệp, Hai Nhất, Kim Loan, Thanh Phúc, Tống Tựu, Quốc Thắng, Thanh Thủy, Minh Thư, Cong Mẫn, Thu Tần, Vân Anh, Hoàng Thắng, Phương Minh, Nguyễn Thanh, Nguyễn Hùng...	'Sóng gió đời người' theme song by Ngọc Anh	Drama, Political	Based on the novel "Chàng vệ sĩ của em" by Triệu Huấn
29 Mar	Người nối dõi (The Successor)	1	VTV Film Prod.	Đỗ Thanh Hải (director); Thiên Phúc (writer); Võ Hoài Nam, Trung Hiếu, Quang Thiện, Trần Đức, Thanh Hiền, Thanh Chi, Tùng Dương, Tuyết Liên, Hoa Thúy, Lan Phượng...		Family, Drama	
5 Apr	Gà ô tử mỵ (My Dear Black Chicken)	1 (90′)	VTV Film Prod.	Đoàn Quốc Thắng (writer); Trần Hạnh, Phú Thăng, Dŭng Nhi, Quốc Khánh, Bá Cường, Tiến Quang, Ngọc Thu, Thu Thủy, Diệp Bích, Tùng Thúy, Lâm Tùng, Tiến Long, Ngọc Thoa, Xuân Thức, Hoàng Tuấn...		Drama, Rural, Fantasy	Based on Vũ Ngọc Tiến's short story of the same name
12 Apr*	Đảo xa (Distant Island)	1 (75′)	VTV Film Prod.	Nguyễn Anh Tuấn (director); Phạm Thị Kim Hiển (writer); Nguyễn Hoàng Anh, Nguyễn Ngọc Hùng, Xuân Bắc, Quang Thiện, Lê Anh Tuấn, Nguyễn Đức Quỳnh, Văn Báu, Phan Hồng, Phạm Tuyết Hoa...		Drama, Children, Family	Based on Văn Linh's short story 'Rồng lấy nước'
19 Apr-10 May	Áp thấp nhiệt đới (Tropical Depression)	4 (65′)	VTV Film Prod.	Bùi Cường (director); Nguyễn Quang Vinh (writer); Chiều Xuân, Tuấn Quang, Phan Phượng, Kim Oanh, Hữu Độ, Thanh Quý, Huệ Đan, Hà Sĩ Toàn, Lương Hữu Đại, Hồ Lan, Đức Mẫn, Vũ Mai Huê, Vân Anh, Hương Trang, Đức Huy, Lan Anh, Khanh Sơn, Đào Hùng, Trần Khôi, Việt Quân, Duy Hùng, Nguyễn Thị Thanh, Thiện Khanh, Trường An, Hoàng Khanh, Xuân Thủy, Minh Tuấn, Tú Lan, Ngọc Bích, Đức Tài, Mai Phương, Viết Đạt, Thu Trà...	'Áp thấp nhiệt đới' theme song Composed by Vũ Thảo	Drama, Business, Romance	
17-24 May	Cố nhân (The One From the Past)	2 (75′)	VTV Film Prod.	Trần Vịnh (director); Lê Tấn Hiển (writer); Hoàng Dũng, Chí Thông, Ngọc Dung, Ánh Nguyệt, Hương Dung, Văn Toản, Tiến Quang, Bằng Thái, Hoàng Thưởng, Bắc Việt, Tố Hương, Văn Thành, Xuân Kiểu...		Drama	
31 May-7 Jun	Khát vọng xanh (Green Dream)	2 (75′)	VTV Film Prod.	Lê Cường Việt (director); Võ Khắc Nghiêm (writer); Khánh Huyền, Phạm Cường, Lachance Dan, Thu Hương, Anh Thái, Hồng Sơn, Giang Minh, Phạm Bằng, Trần Tiệp, Đức Long, Đường Minh Giang, Kim Thoa, Mai Huê, Việt Quân, Hồng Minh, Ngọc Hiền, Ngọc Quang, Thu Vân, Đức Mạnh, Quang Long, Bích Thủy, Hoàng Khánh...	Hitotsu no Heart de by Hidemi Mieno Yumebouken by Noriko Sakai	Drama, Romance	Based on the novel "Giới hạn của hạnh phúc" by Võ Khắc Nghiêm
14 Jun	Một câu nói đùa (A Banter)	1	VTV Film Prod.			Drama	
21 Jun	Dòng sông thao thức (Restless River)	1 (74′)	VTV Film Prod.	Trần Hoài Sơn (director); Thạch Nguyên (writer); Phạm Đình Chiến, Quang Minh, Kim Nhung, Việt Thắng, Nguyễn Văn Huân, Lan Minh, Minh Điệp, Quy Phát, Duy Thành, Thế Công, Văn Uý, Văn Nam, Nguyễn Thị Huyền, Ngọc Long, Doãn Ngọc, Minh Đức, Tân Việt, Ngọc Dư...		Drama	Adapted from Nguyễn Hữu Phùng Nguyên's short story 'Về đâu sông ơi'
28 Jun-5 Jul	Giá của hạnh phúc (Price for Happiness)	2	VTV Film Prod.	Nguyễn Hinh Anh (director); Đoàn Quốc Thắng (writer); Thanh Chi, Hồng Thắm, Thế Bình, Hồ Lan...		Drama, Marriage	
12 Jul	Cửa hàng Lôpa (Lopa Shop)	1 (80′)	VTV Film Prod.	Phạm Thanh Phong (director); Phạm Thanh Phong, Lê Tuấn Phong (writers); Chí Trung, Quốc Khánh, Trịnh Thịnh, Minh Hằng, Minh Vượng, Lê Tuấn Phong, Trịnh Mai, Kim Xuyến, Xuân Phương, Vân Dung, Quế Phương, Quốc Bình, Đình Chiến, Phương Tâm...		Comedy, Business, Marriage	Lopa is short for Love Paradise
19 Jul-9 Aug	Người kế thừa dòng họ (To Succeed the Family Line)	4 (70′)	VTV Film Prod.	Nguyễn Anh Tuấn (director & writer); Thế Tục, Tạ Ngọc Bảo, Hoàng Ngân, Thái Ngạn, Thùy Dung, Quang Đót, Khánh Toàn, Quốc Hưng, Thu Hiền, Lệ Dung, Đoàn Duy Anh, Minh Tuyết, Minh Thảo, Minh Châu, Hồng Quân, Thế Vinh, Tất Ngọc...	'Người kế thừa dòng họ' theme song Composed by Trọng Đài	Rural, Family, Drama	Adapted from Võ Thu Hương's short story 'Bí ẩn khôn cùng của mẹ'
16 Aug	Chuyện ngoài sân cỏ (Far From the Pitch)	1	VTV Film Prod.	Vũ Trường Khoa (director); Đỗ Trí Hùng (writer); An Ninh, Minh Hằng, Tiến Đạt, Minh Vượng, Chu Hùng, Thu Hương, Thu Hương, Đức Khuê, Lê Mai, Văn Hiệp, Xuân Tiên, Quang Thiện, Thế Bình, Tuấn Dương, Ngọc Bích, Oai Hùng, Nguyễn Quân...		Comedy, Marriage, Sport	
23 Aug-27 Sep*	Ẩn số cuộc đời (The Unknown of Life)	2	VTV Film Prod.	Vũ Trường Khoa (director); Đỗ Trí Hùng (writer); Ngọc Linh, Lan Anh, Ngàn Hoa, Bích Ngọc, Hoàng Sơn, Hồng Giang, Hoàng Dũng, Văn Toản, Tuyết Liên, Hồng Thúy, Đức Duy, Cường Việt...		Drama, Marriage	
23 Aug-27 Sep*	Bưu cục trung du (Midlands Post Office)	1	VTV Film Prod.			Drama	
23 Aug-27 Sep*		3	VTV Film Prod.			Drama	
4-25 Oct	Chuyện làng Nhô (Story of Nhô Village)	4 (80′)	VTV Film Prod.	Đặng Lưu Việt Bảo (director); Phạm Ngọc Tiến (writer); Trần Tiến, Nguyễn Hải, Huy Công, Ngọc Thư, Hoàng Lan, Công Bẩy, Chí Thông, Minh Quang, Bá Cường, Hồng Tuấn, Hồng Điệp, Hoàng Giang, Đình Thắng, Minh Tuấn, Kim Quý, Thanh Tùng, Đức Long, Thu Ngà, Vân Anh, Ngọc Anh, Thúy Hiền, Nam Cường, Thế Hồng, Hồ Trung, Đức Mẫn, Ngọc Phúc, Văn Kiện, Trần Tùng, Mạnh Kiểm, Thế Bình, Tuấn Dương, Quốc Phong, Mạnh Thắng, Dương Tùng, Văn Ngọc, Hoàng Tuấn...	Đất ru (Lullaby of the Land) by Ngọc Anh 3A	Rural, Crime, Political, Drama	Adapted from the novel of 'Kẻ ám sát cánh đồng' by Nguyễn Quang Thiều. Based on a true crime case.
1 Nov	Bức tường (The Wall)	1	VTV Film Prod.			Drama	
8 Nov	Hồn của đất (Soul of Soil)	1	VTV Film Prod.	Nguyễn Anh Tuấn (director); Đặng Huy Quyển, Nguyễn Anh Tuấn (writers); Thế Tục, Phú Thăng, Minh Phương, Hải Xuân...		Drama	
15 Nov	Chuyến tàu chạy qua cửa sổ (The Train Passed Through the Window)	1	VTV Film prod.	Tùng Dương...		Drama	
22 Nov	Tổ yến (Salanganes' Nest)	1	VTV Film Prod.			Drama	
29 Nov	Vĩ thanh (Epilogue)	1 (78′)	VTV Film Prod.	Trọng Trinh (director); Thạch Nguyên (writer); Linh Dung, Đức Khuê, Trọng Trinh, Thúy Hà, Trần Tùng, Ngọc Tản, Thúy Ngần, Kim Nhung, Ti Tô, Vân Anh...		Drama, Romance, Musical	
6 Dec	Số phận ngọt ngào (Sweet Fate)	1 (85′)	VTV Film Prod.	Trọng Liên (director); Trần Danh (writer); Hoàng Anh, Kiều Oanh, Thúy Ngần, Mạnh Kiểm, Thu Quế, Kiều Minh Hiếu, Hồng Yến, Hoàng Ngân, Đức Long, Lan Minh, Hương Dung, Hồng Kiến, Tiến Mộc, Trung Cường, Hương Anh, Huy Công, Kim Anh, Đức Ngân...	'Số phận ngọt ngào' theme song Composed by Hoàng Lương	Drama, Slice-of-Life, Family	Adapted from Lê Bầu's short story 'Bụi đời'
13 Dec	Mây mưa mau tạnh (Cloudy Rain Stopped Quickly)	1 (76′)	VTV Film Prod.	Vũ Trường Khoa (director); Nam Sơn (writer); Tuấn Quang, Mai Huê, Quốc Toàn, Trần Đức, Kim Xuyến, Kim Thoa, Anh Tuấn, Minh Hoàng, Duy Long...		Drama, Romance	Adapted from Hồ Anh Thái's short story of the same name
20 Dec	Giọt nắng cuối chiều (Sun Drop in Late Afternoon)	1 (72′)	VTV Film Prod.	Nguyễn Hinh Anh (director); Lương Xuân Thủy (writer); Bá Cường, Thanh Hiền, Kiều Minh Hiếu, Trần Đức, Chu Xuân Hoan, Đinh Xuân Lương, Xuân Đồng, Ngọc Dung, Thành An, Hồng Giang, Bình Trọng, Hồ Lan...	'Giọt nắng cuối chiều' theme song Composed by Vũ Thảo	Drama, Slice-of-Life	Adapted from short story of 'Một thời gió bụi' by Nguyễn Khải
27 Dec	Quán nhỏ (Little Stalls)	1	VTV Film Prod.			Drama	

== See also ==
- List of dramas broadcast by Vietnam Television (VTV)
- List of dramas broadcast by Hanoi Radio Television (HanoiTV)
- List of dramas broadcast by Vietnam Digital Television (VTC)
