= List of VTV dramas broadcast in 1997 =

This is a list of VTV dramas released in 1997.

←1996 - 1997 - 1998→

== VTV Tet dramas ==
These films were released on VTV channel during Tet holiday. In this time, all of the channels were merged with a single broadcast schedule.

- Note: Since late 1996, Vietnam Television Audio Visual Center (Vietnamese: Trung tâm nghe nhìn - Đài truyền hình Việt Nam) had been converted to Vietnam Television Film Production (Vietnamese: Hãng phim truyền hình Việt Nam).

Broadcast	Title	Eps.	Prod.	Cast and crew	Theme song(s)	Genre	Notes
6 Feb	Tết sớm (Early Tết)	1		Đỗ Minh Tuấn (director)		Drama, Slice-of-Life	Airs 12:30, 29th Tet holiday
6 Feb	Vị khách lúc giao thừa (The Guest on New Year's Eve)	1 (45′)	VTV Film Prod.	Nguyễn Khải Hưng (director); Quang Huy (writers); Minh Hòa, Trần Quốc Trọng, Hoàng Duy and Sunday Literature & Art club members	Happy New Year by ABBA	Slice-of-Life, Family, Marriage	Airs 22:10, 29th Tet holiday
7 Feb	Chuyện vặt gia đình (Little Family Emergency)	1	VTV's Literature & Art Committee	Trịnh Lê Văn (director); Đỗ Trí Hùng, Trịnh Lê Văn (writers); Bùi Bài Bình, Ngọc Thu, Phạm Bằng, Hoàng Sơn, Hồng Giang, Bích Thủy, Kim Chi, Vân Anh, Thu Hà, Xuân Tiên, Kim Xuyến, Xuân Lâm, Minh Vượng...		Family, Comedy	Airs 10:45, 1st Tet holiday
8 Feb	Duyên thắm làng Gồ (Love Spreads Gồ Village)	1	VTV Film Prod.	Mạc Văn Chung (director); Lê Công Hội (writer); Linh Huệ, Trung Hiếu, Ngọc Quốc, Tuyết Liên, Phát Triệu, Giang Nga, Quang Thiệu, Trần Thìn, Thanh Thúy, Ngọc Hiền, Thu Thủy, Phương Tâm...		Romance, Rural, Drama	Airs 22:40, 2nd Tet holiday. Adapted from Dương Duy Ngữ's short story 'Hội làng Gồ và rước chữ'.
9 Feb	Chuyện đời (A Life Story)	1	VTV Film Prod.	Triệu Tuấn (director); Đoàn Trúc Quỳnh, Đỗ Bảo Châu (writers); Trần Hạnh, Văn Hiệp, Đức Sơn...		Comedy	Airs 17:45, 3rd Tet holiday
10 Feb	Thổ cẩm (Brocade)	1 (102′)	VTV's Literature & Art Committee	Vi Hòa (director); Vi Hòa, Đoàn Minh Tuấn (writers); Vũ Mai Huê...		Romance, Drama, Ethnic	Airs 21:00, 4th Tet holiday

== Vietnamese dramas on VTV1 night time slot ==
Following the schedule since late 1996, the Wednesday night (around 21:00) on VTV1 was spent to air Vietnamese films more often than the other time slots but it was unstable. It sometimes was used as an extension for foreign drama time slots. In some other cases, the broadcast schedule for several Vietnamese dramas was expanded to non-Wednesdays. The list below includes some of the films that did not air on Wednesdays.

Since 22 Aug, this function of Wednesday was reassigned to Friday.

=== Unstable time slot on Wednesday night ===
Broadcast	Title	Eps.	Prod.	Cast and crew	Theme song(s)	Genre	Notes
1 Jan; Wed	Một chuyến thăm quê (A Ride to Countryside)	1 (40′)		Trần Hoàng (director); Đoàn Trúc Quỳnh (writer); Đức Hải, Vân Anh, Mạnh Tuấn, Kim Xuyến, Phạm Bằng, Kim Quý, Đình Chiến, Thiếu Ngân, Hà Duy...		Comedy, Rural, Romance	Ordered by National Steering Committee for Clean Water and Environmental Sanitation
29 Jan-5 Feb; Wed-Sun/Mon-Wed	Những nẻo đường phù sa (The Alluvial Roads)	Episode 1 to Episode 7	Tây Đô Film Prod.	Châu Huế, Trần Ngọc Phong (directors); Nguyễn Khắc Phục (writer); Quyền Linh, Ngọc Hiệp, Huỳnh Anh Tuấn, Trịnh Kim Chi, Thiệu Ánh Dương, Bảo Châu, Ngọc Phong, Phạm Việt Hùng, Trần Lượng, Kiều Oanh, Thúy Diệp, Đào Bá Sơn, Hồng Ánh, Hoài An, Trọng Hải, Diễm My, Tấn Thành, Phụng Hiệp, Quốc Thịnh, Thành Trí, Mai Trần, Mai Thành, Thanh Liêm, Robert Hải, Thanh Tiến, Quang Huy, Lê Trí, Tú Thanh, Hồng Khắc Đào, Lê Hùng Phương, Lê Diễn, Thùy Liên, Trung Dũng, Trung Cương, Hoàng Long, Hồ Kiểng, Diễm Kiều, Nguyễn Đình Thơ, Quốc Cường, Bá Nguyên, Giỏi Tý...	Những nẻo đường phù sa (The Alluvial Roads); Composed by Bảo Phúc; Performed by Bảo Phúc and other artists (for different versions)	Drama, War, Historical	To be continued. Airs 2 episodes per night except only ep 5 on Mon, 3 Feb. The cast changes with each stages of the plot.
12-19 Feb; Wed-Sun/Wed	Nàng Hương (Her)	6	Tây Đô Film Prod.	Lê Văn Duy (director); Lê Văn Duy, Võ Phi Hùng, Lê Dũng (writers); Lê Công Tuấn Anh, Sao Mai/Mỹ Hạnh, Đoàn Dũng, Hồng Ánh, Nguyễn Hoàng, Lê Trung Cương, Mạc Can, Kim Định, Bích Liên, Đồng Kiều Hạnh, Xuân Lan, Minh Sang, Quang Đạt, Võ Hoàng Như Phúc, Minh Hiếu, Kim Hà, Minh Thư, Đồng Bích Thuận, Tạ Duy Kỳ, Tuấn Khiêm, Mặc Tuyền, Mai Trinh...	'Nàng Hương' theme song Composed by Khánh Vinh	Drama, Romance	Incompleted due to Lê Công Tuấn Anh's death. Based on a true story
30 Apr-2 May; Wed-Fri	Followed by the playback of Câu chuyện 20 năm (20 Years Story), divided into 2 episodes. The drama was first released on VTV1 in 1995						
7-14 May; Wed-Fri/Wed	Hoàng hôn dang dở (Unfinished Afterglow)	3 (75′)	VTV Film Prod.	Trần Phương (director); Nguyễn Quang Vinh (writer); Ngọc Anh, Trần Hạnh, Hoàng Sơn, Phạm Cường, Lương Hữu Đại, Lê Mai, Trần Phương, Ngọc Trâm, Thúy Nga, Hải Yến, Ngọc Hoa, Bích Thủy, Mai Hạnh, Tuấn Long, Thanh Toan, Minh Tân, Hải Anh, An Xuân, Ngô Thìn...	'Hoàng hôn dang dở' theme song Composed by Tuấn Phương	Family, Drama, Romance	
21 May; Wed	Mùa lạnh sẽ đi qua (The Cold Season Will Pass)	1 (83′)	VTV's Literature & Art Committee	Vi Hòa (director & writer); Thanh Tùng, Thúy Hạnh, Hương Lan, An Ninh, Đức Long, Hồng Giang, Xuân Nam, Tuyết Mai, Kim Thoa...		Romance, Drama, Post-war	Adapted from Nguyễn Dậu's short story 'Đôi hoa tai lóng lánh'
28 May-4 Jun; Wed/Wed	Sao đổi ngôi (Shooting Star)	2	VTV Film Prod.	Nguyễn Hữu Luyện (director); Lê Phương Liên (writer); Hoài Thu, Lan Hương, Hoàng Cúc, Thanh Thủy, Đức Sơn, Trang Thanh, Xuân Nguyên, Quốc Thanh, Kỳ Nam, Thương Huyền, Khánh Thiện, Thái Vân...		Drama	
11 Jun; Wed	Chuyện ông và cháu (Story of Grandpa and Grandchild)	1	VTV Film Prod.	Hoàng Trần Doãn (director); Minh Chuyên (writer)		Drama, Family, Children	
18 Jun; Wed	Ga xép (Halt)	1	VTV Film Prod.	Quốc Trọng (director); Công Lý...		Drama	Adapted from Vũ Khắc Khoan's theatrical script of the same name
25 Jun-2 Jul; Wed/Wed	Hoa muống biển (Sea Morning Glory)	2	VTV Film Prod.	Cường Việt (director); Quách Thu Phương...	'Hoa muống biển' theme song Composed by Trọng Đài	Drama	
9 Jul; Wed	Followed by the playback of 1987 feature film Huyền thoại về người mẹ (Legend of a Mother).						
16-23 Jul; Wed/Wed	Còn mãi một tình yêu (Forever a Love)	2 (80′)	VTV Film Prod.	Đỗ Thanh Hải (director); Linh Quân (writer); Phạm Cường, Mai Thu Huyền, Tiến Quang, Thu Thủy, Ngọc Thoa, Diễm Loan, Đức Long, Xuân Tùng, Thanh Thư, Kim Cúc, Trúc Quỳnh, Thúy Nga, Hữu Được, Nguyễn Chức, Gia Ninh, Xuân Thắng, Hoàng Chiến, Hà Thị Mơ, Linh Kiện, Văn Toàn, Trịnh Sơn, Duy Ngọc, Trần Hoàng, Văn Trắm, Xuân Kiên...		Drama, Romance, Rural, Post-war	
25 Jul; Fri	Chuyện về một cây đàn (Story of a Guitar)	1				Drama	
27 Jul; Sun	Bao giờ thuyền lại sang sông (When Will the Boat Cross the River Again)	1 (80′)	VTV Film Prod.	Trần Quốc Trọng (director); Lê Quang Thông (writer); Thế Hùng, Thương Huyền/Ngọc Nga, Thúy Liễu/Thùy Dương, Văn Báu, Thu Thảo, Quang Hà...		Drama, War, Historical, Romance	
30 Jul; Wed	Thì thầm cao nguyên (Whisper on the Plateau)	1	VTV Film Prod.	Nguyễn Anh Tuấn (director & writer); Hữu Phước, Đặng Ci Mi, Đình Thơ, Tấn Thi, Công Hậu, Võ Hoàng Phúc, Ánh Hoa, Hoài An, Trọng Hải, Yến Vi, Uyên Trinh, Nguyễn Phan...	'Thì thầm cao nguyên' theme song	Drama, Slice-of-Life, Ethnic	
1 Aug; Fri	Chuyện tình phố Hội (Faifo Love Story)	1				Romance, Drama	
6 Aug; Wed	Ảo tưởng trắng (White Delusion)	1	VTV Film Prod.	Mạc Văn Chung (director); Linh Huệ...		Drama	
13 Aug; Wed	Vạch dừng (Stop Line)	1	VTV Film Prod.	Nguyễn Thế Hồng (director); Lê Phương (writer); Ngọc Lan, Hữu Độ, Trần Đức, Hữu Đại, Việt Thắng, Vĩnh Xương, Thúy Nga, Thanh Tùng, Thanh Nga, Vũ Tăng, Xuân Kiểm, Việt Hương, Xuân Cải, Đức Anh...		Drama, Crime, Traffic	

==== Ốc đảo vua & Hoàng Lê nhất thống ====
Since the last weekend of April, these two dramas was released on time slots made for their own.

Broadcast	Title	Eps.	Prod.	Cast and crew	Theme song(s)	Genre	Notes
26 Apr-24 May	Ốc đảo vua (The King Oasis)	5	VTV's Literature & Art Committee	Nguyễn Quang Vinh (writer); Hoàng Dũng, Tùng Dương...		Drama	Airs on every Saturday night
27 Apr-29 Jun	Hoàng Lê nhất thống (Imperial Lê's Unification)	10	VTV Film Prod.	Trọng Liên (director); Phan Chí Thành (writer); Tùng Dương, Hoàng Sơn...		Drama, Period, Historical, War	Airs on every Sunday night. Based on Ngô Clan Literature Party's novel 'Hoàng Lê nhất thống chí'.

=== Unstable time slot on Friday night ===
Broadcast	Title	Eps.	Prod.	Cast and crew	Theme song(s)	Genre	Notes
22 Aug-1 Sep; Fri-Sun/Fri-Sun/Mon	Followed by the playback of Ông cố vấn (The Advisor), episode 1 to episode 5. The drama was first released on VTV1 in 1995.						Airs 2 episodes per night. Adapted from Volume 1 of Hữu Mai's novel 'Ông cố vấn: Hồ sơ một điệp viên'. Produced from 1994 to 1997. Originally 50 eps (based on 3 vols) but stopped producing after 10 eps due to budget shortfalls.
22 Aug-1 Sep; Fri-Sun/Fri-Sun/Mon	Ông cố vấn (The Advisor)	Episode 6 to Episode 10 (45′)	Vivafilm	Lê Dân (director); Hữu Mai (writer); Vũ Đình Thân, Nguyễn Bá Lộc, Minh Hòa, Nguyễn Bá Phong, Thành Trí, Nguyễn Hậu, Thanh Mai, Hà Phạm Phú, Hồng Lực, Hồng Khắc Đào, Thanh Tú, Lê Niềm, Hoàng Hoài Nghiêm, Tân Thi, Mai Trần, Lê Công Thế, Phương Hạnh, Lê Anh Triều, Trần Lê Vy...	'Ông cố vấn' theme song Composed by Phú Quang	Intelligence, Drama, Period, Political	Airs 2 episodes per night. Adapted from Volume 1 of Hữu Mai's novel 'Ông cố vấn: Hồ sơ một điệp viên'. Produced from 1994 to 1997. Originally 50 eps (based on 3 vols) but stopped producing after 10 eps due to budget shortfalls.
27 Aug-2 Sep; Wed/Tue	Trong nhà có chàng thiếu úy (In the House a Second Lieutenant)	2	VTV Film Prod.	Trần Vịnh (director); Trung Trung Đỉnh, Lê Hoài Nam (writers); Xuân Thức, Bá Cường, An Ninh, Thanh Hiệp, Diệp Bích, Bích Thủy, Duy Thanh, Huệ Đàn, Ngọc Ánh, Thanh Xuân, Tú Lan...		Drama, Post-war	Produced to celebrate the National Day
5-10 Sep; Fri-Sun/Wed	Followed by Những nẻo đường phù sa (The Alluvial Roads), episode 8 to episode 10.						
12 Sep; Fri	Sóng không phải từ biển (Waves Were Not From the Ocean)	1	VTV Film Prod.	Quốc Trọng (director); Văn Báu...		Drama, Crime	
19-26 Sep; Fri/Fri	Tình đất lòng người (Land's Love, People's Heart)	2 (85′)	VTV Film Prod.	Vi Hòa (director); Vi Kiến Hòa (writer); Minh Hằng, Quyền Linh, Quách Thu Phương, Thanh Tùng, Quang Tú, Vũ Tăng, Hồng Giang, Công Bảo...	'Tình đất lòng người' theme song	Drama	Adapted from Anatoli Stepanovich Ivanov's novel 'Life of Sinful Earth' (Trên mảnh đất người đời).
3-10 Oct; Fri/Fri	Đứng giữa đời (Stand in the Middle of Life)	2 (60′)		Triệu Tuấn (director); Đặng Trung (writer); Hoàng Dũng, Đình Nguyên, Thu Hường, Trần Thạch, Văn Tuấn, Phát Triệu, Bích Thủy, Trần Túc, Trần Khải, Mỹ Bình, Thanh Bình...	'Đứng giữa đời' theme song by Ngọc Anh 3A	Drama, Family, Business, Office	
24 Oct; Fri	Hoa móng rồng (Tail Grape Flowers)	1				Drama	
31 Oct; Fri	Followed by the playback of Hơi ấm tình thương (Warmth of Compassion). The drama was first released on TRT channel.						
14 Nov; Fri	Vị ngọt nhãn lồng (Sweet Taste of Caged Longan)	1				Drama	
21 Nov; Fri	Bí mật của Khải (The Secret of Khải)	1	VTV Film Prod.	Vũ Hồng Sơn (director); Nguyễn Thu Dung (writer); Hoàng Cúc, Đỗ Minh Hương, Hoàng Hà Xa, Đặng Lưu Hà, Kim Thoa, Lan Hương, Thanh Du, Nguyễn Văn Minh, Nguyễn Văn Tiến, Ngọc Tú, Tuấn Anh, Maya...		Drama	
28 Nov; Fri	Trầu têm cánh phượng (Betel in the Shape of Phoenix Wings)	1				Drama	
5 Dec; Fri	Phong lan nở hoa vàng (Orchid Blooming Yellow Flowers)	1		Thanh Quý...		Drama	
19-22 Dec; Fri/Mon	Hiến dâng (The Sacrifice)	2	VTV Center in Mekong Delta	Lê Dân (director); Nguyễn Khắc Phục (writer)		Drama, War	
26 Dec; Fri	Ký ức một thời (Memories of a Time)	1 (65′)	VTV Film Prod.	Nguyễn Khải Hưng (director); Phạm Ngọc Tiến, Hoàng Nhuận Cầm (writers); Võ Hoài Nam, Khánh Huyền, Trần Vịnh, Thanh An, Đức Sơn, Bá Cường, Phát Triệu, Tuyết Mai...		War, Drama, Period	Adapted from Bảo Ninh's short story 'Khắc dấu mạn thuyền'. Celebrating the 'Điện Biên Phủ in the Air' victory.

== For The First Time On VTV3 Screen dramas ==
New program was created this year. For The First Time On VTV3 Screen (Vietnamese: Lần đầu tiên trên màn ảnh VTV3) introduced Vietnamese dramas that had not been aired on VTV3 before. The program was first launched on Tuesday late afternoon (2 Sep) in the occasion of the National Day but then moved to Wednesday late afternoon (around 17:30) since the next issue.

Broadcast	Title	Eps.	Prod.	Cast and crew	Theme song(s)	Genre	Notes
2-10 Sep	Người lính kèn về làng (The Trumpet Soldier Returns to His Village)	2		Trần Quốc Huấn (director & writer)		Drama, Rural, Period	Trần Quốc Huấn adapted his own short story of the same name
17 Sep	Luyện võ (Martial Practice)	1				Drama	
24 Sep	Cơn bão đen (The Black Storm)	1 (72′)	VTV Film Prod.	Hữu Mười, Vũ Đình Thân (directors); Khuất Quang Thụy (writer); Huy Công, Vũ Đình Thân, Diệu Thuần, Minh Hằng, Thanh Hiền, Quốc Tuấn, Ngọc Thư, Minh Tuấn, Tiến Mộc, Hoàng Thắng, Anh Tú, Mạnh Kiên, Thanh Tùng, Đình Thắng, Thái An...		Drama, Political	
1 Oct	Chuyện của những người đàn bà (Story of the Women)	1		Phi Tiến Sơn (director & writer); Kim Thúy, Tú Oanh, Khánh Huyền, Minh Hằng, Quốc Trị, Đức Sơn, Đức Hải, Quốc Khánh, Ngọc Tuấn, Tuyết Liên, Sĩ Toàn, Lệ Hằng, Hoàng Hải, Hương Dung, Xuân Thức...		Drama	Adapted from Nguyễn Thị Huệ's short story 'Tình yêu ơi, ở đâu' and some reports by Thanh Tâm
8-15 Oct	Vết trói (Tying Smear)	2	VFS	Nguyễn Thanh Vân (director); Lưu Nghiệp Quỳnh (writer); Võ Hoài Nam...		Drama	
22-29 Oct	Ánh sáng kinh thành (The Light of Imperial City)	2 (90′)	VFS	Hà Lê Sơn (director); Trịnh Thanh Nhã (writer); Thu Thủy, Đức Hải, Công Thắng, Mạnh Sinh, Đức Sơn, Thái An, Tuấn Thu, Vũ Tăng, Vân Anh, Minh Phương, Việt Quân, Việt Chung, Kim Thoa...		Drama, Period	Based on some reports by Vũ Trọng Phụng
5-19 Nov	Tứ tử trình làng (Showing of the Four)	3 (65′)		Nguyễn Hữu Luyện (director & writer); Hoàng Kiên, Khương Trang, Thu Huyền, Hồng Quang, Thanh Nam, Thu Hồng, Vân Anh, Minh Phương, Diệp Bích, Thanh Thủy, Tất Tiến, Văn Trung, Phương Đông, Trịnh Thịnh, Phạm Bằng, Tuyết Liên, An Ninh, Văn Toản, Thu Hiền, Phong Lan, Văn Quang, Trang Thanh, Đức Nguyên, Quang Tuấn, Anh Thơ, Hoài Thu, Hồng Hạnh, Chu Quân...	'Tứ tử trình làng' theme song Composed by Đặng Hữu Phúc	Drama, Scholastic, Youth	
26 Nov-3 Dec	Mây trắng ánh sao (Starlight and White Clouds)	2 (80′)	Feature Film Studio I	Nguyễn Thế Vĩnh (director); Huy Bảo (writer); Ngọc Thoa, Quách Thu Phương, Huệ Hát, Nguyễn Văn Bộ, Minh Nguyệt, Trần Lợi...	'Mây trắng ánh sao' theme song by Thái Bảo	Drama, Ethnic, Family	
10 Dec	Những ngày xa mẹ (Days Away From Mom)	1 (80′)		Đặng Phi (director); Đào Phương Liên (writer); Lê Hiếu, Phạm Chiến, Lan Hương, Duy Hậu, Đức Trung, Trung Hiếu, Nguyệt Hằng, Văn Thành, Anh Tuấn, Văn Toản, Hán Văn Tình...		Drama	Based on Phạm Ngọc Tiến's short story "Đợi mặt trời"
17-31 Dec	Một ông sao sáng, hai ông sáng sao (A Star's Shining, Two Shining Stars)	3		Bùi Cường (director); Nguyễn Thị Hồng Ngát (writer); Huệ Đàn, Minh Châu, Thanh Quý, Nguyễn Văn Bốn...		Drama	

== VTV3 Sunday Literature & Art dramas ==
These dramas air in early Sunday afternoon on VTV3 as a part of the program Sunday Literature & Art (Vietnamese: Văn nghệ Chủ Nhật).

- Note: The time slot was delayed on 9 Feb due to the broadcast schedule for Tet programs.

Broadcast	Title	Eps.	Prod.	Cast and crew	Theme song(s)	Genre	Notes
5 Jan	Chốn quê (The Countryside)	1	VTV Film Prod.	Triệu Tuấn (director); Tuyết Liên, Trần Thạch, Hồ Lan, Linh Huệ, Xuân Đồng...		Rural, Drama	
12 Jan	Khoảnh khắc cuối cuộc đời (Ending Moment of Life)	1	VTV Film Prod.	Phạm Thanh Phong (director)		Drama	
19 Jan	Tiếng vạc sành (The Sound of Bittern)	1 (85′)	VTV Film Prod.	Trần Quốc Trọng (director); Lê Công Hội (writer); Chấn Cường, Công Ninh, Mai Huỳnh, Hải Âu, Hồ Kiểng, Long Hải, Mỹ Dung, Hai Trúc...		Drama, Post-war, Rural	Adapted from short story of the same name by Phạm Trung Khâu
26 Jan	Huyền thoại chợ tình (Legend of Love Market)	1	VTV Film Prod.	Trần Lực (director); Nguyễn Quang Thiều (writer); Lê Khanh, Ngọc Thoa, Trần Lực, Trung Anh, Thanh Tâm, Sĩ Tiến, Xuân Tùng, Vũ Tăng, Chí Thanh, Nguyễn Thị Dậu, Đinh Thị Khuyến...		Romance, Drama	Adapted from Nguyễn Thị Châu Giang's short story 'Chợ tình'
2 Feb	Ông trẻ về ăn Tết (Younger Grandpa Came For Tết)	1	VTV Film Prod.	Nguyễn Hữu Phần (director); Đoàn Minh Tuấn (writer); Trịnh Thịnh, Thanh Dương, Hồ Lan, Hoàng Du Ka, Thùy Mi...		Comedy, Family	Airs as a part of Tet drama series
16-23 Feb	Con sóng đầu đời (The Wave in Early Life)	2	VTV Film Prod.	Vân Thảo (writer); Ngọc Bích...		Drama, Rural	
2 Mar	Trong mây trăng rằm vẫn sáng (In the Cloud, Full Moon Still Shines)	1	VTV Film Prod.	Vũ Hồng Sơn (director); Lưu Hà...		Drama, Crime	
9-23 Mar	Ngôi nhà xưa hoang vắng (Deserted Old House)	3	VTV Film Prod.	Phó Bá Nam (director & writer); Hồng Sơn, Mạnh Tuấn, Như Quỳnh, Thành An, Tiến Mộc, Huệ Đàn, Thu Hiền, Quế Phương, Tuấn Dương, Trần Hạnh, Phát Triệu, Thanh Chi, Minh Tâm...		Drama, Family	Adapted from Đỗ Chu's novel 'Mảnh vườn xưa hoang vắng'
30 Mar	Con chim lạc đàn (The Stray Bird)	1	VTV Film Prod.	Nguyễn Hinh Anh (director)		Drama	
6 Apr	Những giấc mơ bằng giấy (Paper Dreams)	1 (76′)	VTV Film Prod.	Nguyễn Khải Hưng (director); Hoàng Nhuận Cầm (writer); Kim Lân, Huệ Anh, Phạm Bằng, Kiều Minh Hiếu, Minh Vượng, Kim Thoa, Vinh Quy, Hồng Điệp, Văn Toản, Hoàng Thắng, Quang Thiện, Ngọc Tuyết, Lan Minh, Mai Hằng, Xuân Thức, An Nguyên, Vân Quyền, Mạnh Hải, Trọng Vân...		Drama	Adapted from Bình Nguyên Trang's short story 'Hàng mã'
13 Apr	Kẻ cắp bất đắc dĩ (Unavoidable Thief)	1	VTV Film Prod.	Bùi Thạc Chuyên (director); Xuân Bắc, Lệ Hằng, Anh Tuấn...		Drama, Romance	
20-27 Apr	Lựa chọn (Choose)	2	VTV Film Prod.	Quốc Trọng (director)		Drama	
4 May	Những ngả đường tình yêu (Ways of Love)	1	VTV Film Prod.	Nguyễn Hữu Phần, Hoàng Thanh Du (director); Hoàng Thanh Du (writer); Đức Sơn, Hoàng Lan, Thanh Dương, Lệ Hằng, Kim Thoa, Trần Nhượng...		Drama, Romance	
11-18 May	Vợ chồng chị Hòa (Hòa and Her Husband)	2 (65′)	VTV Film Prod.	Bùi Cường (director); Trần Trung Nhàn (writer); Mai Hòa, Huệ Đàn, Phan Ngọc Tú, Đỗ Lan Anh, Phạm Thu Thủy, Công Bảy, Minh Tiếp, Trần Trung Nhàn, Trần Hạnh, Hồng Điệp, Lê Tấn Cường, Lê Trung Kiên, Hồng Mến, Khánh Sơn...	'Vợ chồng chị Hòa' theme song Composed by Vũ Thảo	Marriage, Drama	
25 May	Những mùa đông nước Nga (Russian Winters)	1	VTV Film Prod.	Lưu Lan Hương (writer)		Drama, Marriage, Slice-of-Life	
1 Jun	Ông Bụt lớp 7B (Class 7B's Fairy Man)	1 (71′)	VTV Film Prod.	Nguyễn Hữu Trọng (director); Nguyễn Phi (writer); Anh Quân, An Chinh, Linh Chi, Quốc Trị, Bích Thủy, Thu Hiền, Văn Phúc, Văn Toản, Minh Vượng, Thanh Lâm, Trần Thiện...		Drama, Children, Scholastic	
8-15 Jun	Những mảnh đời ghép lại (Russian Winters)	2	VTV Film Prod.	Đặng Tất Bình (director); Quang Tú...		Drama, Slice-of-Life	
22 Jun	Góc khuất tình yêu (Hidden Corner of Love)	1	VTV Film Prod.	Khải Hưng (director); Quách Thu Phương...		Romance, Drama	
29 Jun-6 Jul	Nơi ngày xưa yên tĩnh (Quiet Old Place)	2	VTV Film Prod.	Phạm Thanh Phong (director)		Drama	
13-20 Jul	Biển lặng (Silent Sea)	2	VTV Film Prod.	Nguyễn Anh Tuấn (director & writer)		Drama	
27 Jul	Bông cúc tím (Purple Daisy)	1 (78′)	VTV Film Prod.	Nguyễn Hữu Phần (director); Lê Tấn Hiển (writer); Đỗ Kỷ, Hồ Lan, Thanh Hiền, Hồng Giang, Vân Anh, Hoàng Lan, Vân Anh, Hoàng Lan, Điền Viên, Thanh Tùng, Hữu Độ...	Mùa xuân (Spring); Composed by Phạm Minh Tuấn; Performed by Cẩm Vân	Drama, Post-war	
3 Aug	Kẻ gieo mầm ác (Evil Sower)	1	VTV Film Prod.	Qúi Dũng (director); Hữu Độ...		Drama, Crime	
10-31 Aug	Nụ tầm xuân (Spring Bud)	4 (75′)	VTV Film Prod.	Bạch Diệp (director); Thanh Tâm (writer); Lan Hương, Anh Tú, Hoàng Dũng, Ngọc Thoa, Hoàng Yến, Phú Thăng, Hồ Lan, Vân Anh, Minh Phương, Vũ Tăng, Kim Xuyến, Lê Mai, Hạc Đính, Ngọc Thoa, Khánh Huyền, Mạnh Cường, Thu Hiền, Đức Tùng, Thanh Chi, Thanh Quang...	'Nụ tầm xuân' theme song by Thu Hồng	Romance, Drama	Adapted from Thăng Sắc's novel 'Những ngày không em'
7 Sep	Mưa dầm ngõ nhỏ (Lasting Rain in Small Lane)	1	VTV Film Prod.	Trọng Trinh (director); Bùi Bài Bình, Quách Thu Phương, Lưu Hà...		Drama	
14 Sep	Người năm ấy của mẹ (The One Mom Used to be With)	1 (85′)	VTV Film Prod.	Nguyễn Hữu Phần (director); Hoàng Thanh Du (writer); Trần Đức, Minh Phương, Lưu Sa An Na, Quốc Toàn, Thu Hạnh, Quang Tuấn, Thanh Tùng, Thu Tân, Kim Xuyến, Minh Quang, Thu Hương, Quang Thanh, Mạnh Hùng, Marcus Scoh, Gardner Greke...		Romance, Drama, Family, Coming-of-Age	
21 Sep	Điều không nhận thấy (Unnoticed Thing)	1 (82′)	VTV Film Prod.	Vũ Minh Trí (director); Nguyễn Thị Ngân Hoa (writer); Nguyễn Bích Ngọc, Tuấn Quang, Phạm Bằng, Minh Vượng, Phú Thăng, Thanh Hiệp, Đức Long, Phát Triệu, Hoàng Công, Vũ Long, Anh Tuấn...		Drama, Romance	
28 Sep-19 Oct	Thiên đường ở trên cao (Heaven Above)	4 (75′)	VTV Film Prod.	Bùi Cường (director); Đặng Minh Châu (writer); Hoàng Thu Hường, Cát Trần Tùng, Tuyết Liên, Huệ Đàn, Thúy Nga, Vũ Mai Huê, Khương Duy, Công Bảy, Phùng Việt Quân, Trần Huy Phúc, Thúy Hiền, Lưu Sa An Na, Phát Triệu, Kim Thoa, Trần Nhượng, Tạ Duy Hưng, Nguyễn Khánh Sơn, Kim Bình, Kim Oanh, Hồ Chung, Bùi Hồng Quang, Đức Lợi, Danh Thái, Việt Yên, Nguyễn Hữu Định, Hoàng Lan, Trần Mai Ca...	Thiên đường ở trên cao (Heaven Above) by Trần Thu Hà	Drama, Romance	Adapted from Võ Hồng's novel of the same name
26 Oct	5 ngày làm Thượng Đế (Five Days Almighty)	1 (79′)	VTV Film Prod.	Quí Dũng (director); Đỗ Trí Hùng (writer); Trần Tiến, Trần Đức, Võ Hoài Nam, Diệp Bích, Kim Xuyến, Văn Hiệp, Công Lý, Đức Khuê, Quỳnh Lan...		Comedy, Family	
2 Nov	Bong bóng lên trời (Balloons to the Sky)	1 (75′)	VTV Film Prod.	Đỗ Chí Hướng (director); Đào Phương Liên (writer); Hoàng Tùng, Phương Anh, Thanh Hiền, Lan Hương, An Ninh, Mỹ Linh, Minh Vượng, Phạm Bằng, Thanh Thúy, Minh Thúy, Thanh Dong, Vinh Phúc, Thúy Hiền, Công Tuấn, Trọng Trinh, Quốc Huy, Minh Hoàng, Thế Minh, Văn Hưng, Lê Thiện...	'Bong bóng lên trời' theme song by Thúy Thúy & Mi Mi	Children, Drama, Slice-of-Life	Adapted from short story of the same name by Nguyễn Nhật Ánh
9-30 Nov	Chuyện đời thường (Ordinary Life Story)	4 (65′)	VTV Film Prod.	Phó Bá Nam (director & writer); Lê Thế Tục, Ngọc Lan, Thanh Chi, Minh Phương, Huy Công, Phạm Bằng, Trần Hạnh, Lan Minh, Minh Tuấn, Ngọc Thu, Vân Hà, Hải Hà, Tùng Dương, Bích Huyền, Trịnh Mai, Hồ Lan, Phương Mai, Thành Tuấn...	'Chuyện đời thường' theme song by Đức Long	Drama, Family, Romance	
7 Dec	Hạnh phúc không ngọt ngào (Not-Sweet Happiness)	1	VTV Film Prod.	Lê Cường Việt, Châu Minh Xuyến (directors); Triệu Vũ (writer); Bình Thi, Anh Tuấn, Hồng Vân, Mai Huỳnh, Kiều Oanh, Kinh Quốc, Như Phúc, Diễm Kiều, Vũ Xuân, Hồng Tơ, Uyên Trinh, Văn Hùng, Kim Tính, Bích Đào, Thu Phương, Quế Loan, Châu Ân, Quốc Tý, Văn Linh...	'Hạnh phúc không ngọt ngào' theme song by Thanh Thanh Hiền and Lê Minh Châu	Drama, Romance	
14-28 Dec	Xin hãy tin em (Please Trust Me)	3 (75′)	VTV Film Prod.	Đỗ Thanh Hải (director); Đặng Diệu Hương, Đỗ Thanh Hải (writers); Lệ Hằng, Lê Vũ Long, Hoa Thúy, Thúy Nga, Xuân Tùng, Thùy Giang, Anh Tuấn, Hồng Tuấn, Hồng Quân, Trần Nhượng, Nguyệt Nga, Thu Hiền, Hải Anh, Thanh Vân, Hồ Tháp, Hương Dung, Nguyệt Hằng, Vân Anh, Kim Bình, Ngọc Bích, Lê Công Tuấn, Bình Trọng, Hà Duy, Thu Hương, Quang Anh, Xuân Mai, Trần Hùng, Lê Phong, Anh Minh, Vân Trang, Tuấn Dương...	Mong ước kỷ niệm xưa (Yearning For Past Memories) by 3A the trio	Romance, Drama, Youth, Scholastic	Adapted from short story of the same name by Nguyễn Thị Thu Huệ

== See also ==
- List of dramas broadcast by Vietnam Television (VTV)
- List of dramas broadcast by Hanoi Radio Television (HanoiTV)
- List of dramas broadcast by Vietnam Digital Television (VTC)
