= 14th Vietnam Film Festival =

2004 film festival in Vietnam

Liên hoan phim Việt Nam lần thứ 14 (14th Vietnam Film Festival)
- Location: Buôn Ma Thuột, Vietnam
- Founded: 1970
- Awards: Golden Lotus: Người đàn bà mộng du (Feature); Mùa sen (Direct-to-video Feature); Thang đá ngược ngàn (Documentary); Chuyện về những đôi giày (Animated)
- Hosted by: Thiệu Ánh Dương
- Festival date: November 4 - November 11, 2004
- Website: 14th Vietnam Film Festival

Vietnam Film Festival chronology
- 15th 13th

The 14th Vietnam Film Festival was held from November 4 to November 11, 2004 in Buôn Ma Thuột City, Đắk Lắk Province, Vietnam, with the slogan: "For an advanced Vietnam cinema imbued with national identity" (Vietnamese: "Vì một nền điện ảnh Việt Nam tiên tiến, đậm đà bản sắc dân tộc").

== Event ==
This is the first film festival held in the Central Highlands, the first time a non-state cinema unit has submitted works, marking a new turning point in the implementation of the country's policy of socializing cinema. It was also announced that: "For the first time there will be the Technique Award and the Most Popular Film award. These are calculated for each genre, to encourage cinematographers to develop their talents." But later in the award ceremony, the most popular film award was cancelled. "Because the number of votes for the "most popular" films is too scattered, no film can reach more than half of the total votes, so it cannot be awarded," said Mrs. Nguyễn Thị Hồng Ngát, Deputy Director of the Cinema Department.

=== Participation ===
A total of 101 films entered the festival: 22 feature films, 15 direct-to-video feature films, 46 documentaries/science films (16 feature films & 30 direct-to-video films) and 18 animated films. 4 Golden Lotuses was awarded to the feature film "Người đàn bà mộng du", the direct-to-video film "Mùa sen", the documentary film "Thang đá ngược ngàn" and the animated film "Chuyện về những đôi giày".

A surprise was the Silver Lotus award given to the private film "Những cô gái chân dài". This is the first time a private film has entered the Film Festival. It is suggested that this is just an encouragement. However, according to the criteria of this film festival, this is an example of a cinema that is gradually reaching the audience.

=== Activities ===
The film screening program and exchanges with the film crew before the screenings will take place from November 4th to 7th at Hưng Đạo Cinema, Kim Đồng Cinema and Provincial Party Hall of Đắk Lắk Province in the morning (8:00), afternoon (14:00) and evening (19:00).

The conference within the framework of this film festival also has a big difference. Previously, the seminars focused only on the professional, the situation of film production ("input" of the films). This time, only one seminar was held, which is "Solutions to attract movie audiences" (Vietnamese: "Giải pháp thu hút khán giả điện ảnh"). This shows the beginning of interest in the "output" of the movies.

The festival also includes the following activities:

- On November 5, a seminar on Vietnamese films (8:30); Artists interact with workers at Thắng Lợi Coffee Farm (14:00); Exchange with the audience in Buôn Ma Thuột City at the Central House of Culture (19:00);
- On November 6, the artist interacted with students of Tây Nguyên University (8:30) and at 19:00 interacted with border guards.
- At 19:45 on November 7 at Ngã Sáu Square, the closing night of the 14th Vietnam Film Festival will take place and will be broadcast live on VTV.

=== Inadequacy ===
The cancellation of the "public favorite" award without notice, the addition of a Silver Lotus award to "Những cô gái chân dài" while excluding or honoring films of high artistic quality that represent Judging criteria are quite arbitrary. It caused a reaction among artists and in public opinion.

The announcement that the awards were decided by the Steering Committee of the Film Festival on the basis of the proposal of the jury caused many questions and doubts. It is not known who the Steering Committee consists of, what is the level of artistic appraisal, whether you have seen the film, whether there is a collective decision? It is known that before the award ceremony, there were members of the Steering Committee who did not know anything about the award results because they were not discussed.

The festival also suffered from many technical errors in the organization. At the opening ceremony of the artists, the delegates were pushed up and down, running in and out to serve the director's script. The tiny logo made of white paper pasted on the font looks very sketchy. After the award ceremony, artists and journalists flocked to Thắng Lợi Hotel to attend a reception. The invitations began at 9:30 p.m., but they had to wait almost an hour without eating because the host was still outside the stage for the music show without an apology when the reception was delayed.

== Official Selection ==
=== Feature film ===
Original title	English title	Director(s)	Production
Biển đợi		Trần Ngọc Phong	Giải Phóng Film
Cái tát sau cánh gà	The Backstage Slap	Đặng Tất Bình	Feature Film Studio I
Của rơi	Missing Object	Vương Đức	VFS
Đêm Bến Tre	Bến Tre Night	Trần Phương	People's Army Cinema
Gái nhảy	Bar Girls	Lê Hoàng	Giải Phóng Film
Hà Nội 12 ngày đêm	Hanoi: 12 Days and Nights	Bùi Đình Hạc	VFS
Hàng xóm	The Neighbors	Phạm Lộc	VFS
Ký ức Điện Biên	Memories of Điện Biên	Đỗ Minh Tuấn	VFS
Lưới trời	Heaven's Net	Phi Tiến Sơn	Feature Film Studio I
Mê Thảo, thời vang bóng	Mê Thảo: There Was a Time When	Việt Linh	Giải Phóng Film
Một giờ làm quan		Vũ Châu	VFS
Nguyễn Ái Quốc ở Hồng Công	Nguyễn Ái Quốc in Hongkong	Nguyễn Khắc Lợi	Vivafilm, Zhujiang Film Prod.
Người đàn bà mộng du	Sleep-walking Woman	Nguyễn Thanh Vân	VFS
Người học trò đất Gia Định xưa		Huy Thành	Nguyễn Đình Chiểu Film
Những cô gái chân dài	The Long-Legged Girls	Vũ Ngọc Đãng	Galaxy Studio
Tết này ai đến xông nhà		Trần Lực	VFS
Thời xa vắng	A Time Far Past	Hồ Quang Minh	Giải Phóng Film
Tiếng dương cầm trong mưa	Piano in the Rain	Lê Hữu Lương	Giải Phóng Film
Trái đắng	Bitter Fruit	Lê Văn Duy	Nguyễn Đình Chiểu Film
Trò đùa của Thiên Lôi	Thunderer's Joke	Nguyễn Quang	Feature Film Studio I
U14 - Đội bóng trong mơ	U14 the Dream Football Team	Lâm Lê Dũng	Giải Phóng Film
Vua bãi rác	Foul King	Đỗ Minh Tuấn	VFS

Highlighted title indicates Golden Lotus winner.

== Awards ==
=== Feature film ===
Award		Winner
Film	Golden Lotus	Người đàn bà mộng du
Film	Silver Lotus	Lưới trời Hà Nội 12 ngày đêm Những cô gái chân dài
Film	Grand Jury Prize	Nguyễn Ái Quốc ở Hồng Công
Film	Jury's Merit	Của rơi Vua bãi rác
Film	Technique Prize	Hàng xóm Trò đùa của Thiên Lôi
Best Director		Nguyễn Thanh Vân – Người đàn bà mộng du
Best Actor		Đức Khuê – Của rơi, Hàng xóm
Best Actress		Hồng Ánh – Người đàn bà mộng du
Best Supporting Actor		Lê Vũ Long – Người đàn bà mộng du
Best Supporting Actress		Thúy Nga – Mê Thảo, thời vang bóng
Best Screenplay		Nguyễn Mạnh Tuấn – Lưới trời
Best Cinematography		Nguyễn Hữu Tuấn – Người đàn bà mộng du
Best Art Design		Phạm Hồng Phong – Mê Thảo, thời vang bóng
Best Original Score		Đỗ Hồng Quân – Của rơi, Hà Nội 12 ngày đêm

==== Direct-to-video ====
Award		Winner
Film	Golden Lotus	Mùa sen
Film	Silver Lotus	Chim phí bay về cội nguồn Không còn gì để nói
Film	Technique Prize	Điệp vụ thứ nhất
Best Director		Võ Tấn Bình – Mùa sen
Best Actor		Mạnh Cường – Không còn gì để nói
Best Actress		Thanh Thúy – Mùa sen
Best Supporting Actor		not awarded
Best Supporting Actress		not awarded
Best Screenplay		Thảo Phương – Chim phí bay về cội nguồn
Best Cinematography		Nguyễn Hồng Chi – Sống chậm
Best Original Score		Bảo Phúc – Rặng trâm bầu

=== Documentary/Science film ===
Award		Winner
Film	Golden Lotus	Thang đá ngược ngàn
Film	Silver Lotus	Cột mốc vàng Điện Biên Phủ; H’Non; Sự nhọc nhằn của cát Nuôi tôm hùm lồng trên biển
Film	Technique Prize	Kèn đồng
Best Director		Lê Hồng Chương – Thang đá ngược ngàn
Best Screenplay		Phan Thanh Tú – Sự nhọc nhằn của cát
Best Cinematography		Triệu Thế Chiến – Nuôi tôm hùm lồng trên biển
Best Sound Design		Lê Huy Hòa – Thang đá ngược ngàn

=== Animated film ===
Award		Winner
Film	Golden Lotus	Chuyện về những đôi giày
Film	Silver Lotus	Tiếng nhạc ve Cuộc sống
Film	Technique Prize	Mực ống mực nang
Best Director		Nguyễn Phương Hoa – Chuyện về những đôi giày
Best Screenplay		Hồ Quảng – Cuộc sống
Best Cinematography		Nguyễn Văn Nẫm – Tiếng nhạc ve, Cuộc sống
Best Animator		Phạm Ngọc Tuấn – Tiếng nhạc ve Hoàng Lộc, Hồng Sơn – Chuyện về những đôi giày Trần Khánh Duyên – Con sâu
Best Original Score		Hoàng Lương – Con sâu
