= List of VTV dramas broadcast in 1999 =

This is a list of VTV dramas released in 1999.

←1998 - 1999 - 2000→

== VTV Tet dramas ==
These films were released on VTV channels during Tet holiday.

Broadcast	Title	Eps.	Prod.	Cast and crew	Theme song(s)	Genre	Notes
15 Feb	Về quê (Coming Rural Homeland)	1		Xuân Hồng (director); Nguyễn Hợp (writer); Ngọc Thoa, Trần Hạnh, Thành An, Vân Hà...		Family, Drama, Rural	Airs 17:00, 30th Tet holiday on VTV1. Based on Bùi Ngọc Tấn's short story 'Những người đi ở'.
15 Feb	Nơi gặp gỡ của hai con tàu (Where Two Trains Find Each Others)	1 (40′)	VTV Film Prod.	Nguyễn Khải Hưng (director); Mai Đức (writer); Minh Hòa, Quốc Tuấn, Đặng Lưu Hà, Hoàng Duy, Đức Sơn, Quang Vinh, Thanh Loan, Kim Trúc, Kim Chung, Thu Phượng, Nguyên Vũ, Kiều Mai, Thanh Bình, Ngọc Bích, Thanh Tuyền, Phương Chi...		Family, Marriage, Romance	Airs 22:15, 30th Tet holiday on VTV1
16 Feb	Chìm nổi bên sông (Floating On The River)	1				Drama	Airs 08:30, 1st Tet holiday on VTV1
16 Feb	Theo dấu bích đào (Tracking the Crimson Peach)	1 (60′)	VTV Film Prod.	Trọng Trinh (director); Nguyên An (writer); Trung Anh, Đức Sơn, Hồng Chương, Hữu Độ, Lâm Thanh, Trần Tùng, Thu Hà, Vũ Tăng, Bá Cường, Nhật Ánh, Hồng Gấm, Văn Sản, Ngọc Thu, Văn Chí, Ngọc Lan...		Drama, Romance, Slice-of-Life	Airs 17:10, 1st Tet holiday on VTV1. Based on Bão Vũ's short story 'Áo bích đào'.
17 Feb	Cộng sinh (Symbiosis)	1	VTV and TĐN	Lê Ngọc Linh (writer); Hoàng Hải, Thanh Hà, Lê Thành...		Drama	Airs 08:15, 2nd Tet holiday on VTV1
17 Feb	Lên giời (Skyward)	1 (90′)	VTV Film Prod.	Phạm Thanh Phong (director); Thiên Phúc (writer); Tiến Mộc, Phú Đôn, Trần Tiến, Minh Vượng, Quốc Khánh, Hồ Lan, Trần Thịnh, Ngọc Bích, Trần Quân...		Comedy, Drama	Airs 14:00, 2nd Tet holiday on VTV3. Based on Nguyễn Xuân Thái's short story 'Chí Phèo thành thị'.
18 Feb	Thơ Mênh Chây (Thmenh Chay)	1	VTV Center in Mekong Delta	Mạnh Thu Hồng (director)		Drama, Ethnic	Airs 08:30, 3rd Tet holiday on VTV1. Based on a Khmer folktale.
18 Feb	Chuyến taxi cuối ngày (Late Taxi Ride)	1	VTV Film Prod.	Trần Quốc Trọng (director); Thạch Nguyên (writer); Xuân Bắc, An Quý, Chí Nghĩa, Hồ Phong, Trần Tiệp, Phát Triệu, Lan Minh, Xuân Thức, Vũ Tăng, Lev Olekxandr, Hoài Anh, Đức Duy, Nguyễn Đạt, Mỹ Dung, Nguyễn Trung...	Egao wa Kimi no Wasuremono by Yuka Sato	Romance, Drama	Airs 17:00, 3rd Tet holiday on VTV1. Based on Bảo Vũ's short story "Người đi chuyến taxi cuối ngày".

== VTV1 Friday night dramas ==
=== Unstable time slot on Friday night for Vietnamese dramas ===
Following the previous year, the Friday night (around 21:00) on VTV1 was spent to air Vietnamese films more often than the other time slots but it was unstable. It sometimes was used as an extension for foreign drama time slots. In some other cases, the broadcast schedule for several Vietnamese dramas was expanded to non-Fridays. The list below includes some of the films that did not air on Fridays.

Broadcast	Title	Eps.	Prod.	Cast and crew	Theme song(s)	Genre	Notes
26 Jan-9 Mar; Tue-Thu/Mon-Tue-Thu/Tue-Thu-Fri/Mon-Tue-Thu-Fri/Thu-Fri/Tue	Câu chuyện cuối tuần (Weekend Story)	25 (30′)	VTV and TĐN	Trần Quốc Trọng (director); Nguyễn Khắc Phục (writer); Văn Báu...		Drama	Airs 1 ep per night on Tue, 2 ep per night on Mon, Thu, Fri
1-2 Mar; Mon-Tue	Biên cương thường ngày (Daily in Borderland)	2 (80′)	VTV Film Prod.	Trần Quốc Trọng (director); Trung Trung Đỉnh, Chu Thế Quỳnh (writers); Tuấn Quang, Tạ Minh Thảo, Đình Sản, Ngọc Dung, Hữu Đại, Mạnh Tuấn, Tiến Lịch, Quốc Trọng, Ngọc Vân, Khánh Huỳnh, Quang Dũng, Lê Thu Hà, Việt Châu...		Drama, Rural	Produced in occasion of the Border Guard Day.
12-19 Mar; Fri/Mon-Fri	Followed by the playback of Hoàng hôn dang dở (Unfinished Afterglow), 3 episodes. The drama was first released on VTV1 in May 1997.						
21 Mar; Sun	Followed by the playback of Người nối dõi (The Successor). The drama was first released on VTV3 in March 1998.						
26 Mar-2 Apr; Fri/Fri	Followed by the playback of Những nhánh cây đời (Branches of Life Tree), 2 episodes. The drama was first released on VTV3 in May 1998.						
30 Mar-1 Apr; Tue-Thu; 2-3 Sep; Thu-Fri	Viên ngọc Côn Sơn (Côn Sơn the Pearl)	4	Nguyễn Đình Chiểu Film	Lê Văn Duy (director); Nguyễn Khắc Phục (writer); Mạnh Dung, Kim Xuân, Trương Minh Quốc Thái, Yến Vy, Robert Hải...	Lá bàng (Leaves of the Island); Composed by Trần Vương Thạch	Drama, War, Historical	
8-9 Apr; Thu-Fri	Followed by the playback of Người lính kèn về làng (The Trumpet Soldier Returns to His Village), 2 episodes. The drama was first released on VTV3 in Sep 1997.						
23 Apr; Fri	Followed by the playback of Ước mơ của má (Mother's Wish). The single-episode drama was first released on VTV1 in 1998.						
30 Apr; Fri	Followed by the playback of 1990 feature film Chiến trường chia nửa vầng trăng (Battlefield Split the Moon in Half).						
4 May; Tue	Followed by the playback of 1994 feature film Hoa ban đỏ (The Red Ban Flower).						
5 May; Wed	Followed by the playback of 1992 feature film Điện Biên Phủ.						
19 May; Wed	Followed by the playback of Huyền thoại vườn vải (Legend of Lychee Garden). The single-episode drama was first released on VTV1 in 1995.						
28 May; Fri	Followed by the playback of Chuyện của Hạ (Story About Hạ). The single-episode drama was first released on VTV3 in Jan 1998.						
3 Jun; Thu	Followed by the playback of Một chuyện tình (A Love Story). The drama was first released on VTV3 four months ago.						
4 Jun; Fri	Followed by the playback of Hoa lộc vừng (Freshwater Mangrove Flowers). The drama was first released on VTV3 in Jun 1998.						
8-10 Jun; Tue-Thu	Followed by the playback of Sau lũy tre làng (Behind the Bamboo Fence), 2 episodes. The drama was first released on VTV3 in Aug 1998.						
17-29 Jun; Thu-Fri/Tue-Thu-Fri/Tue	Vui buồn sau lũy tre (Delight & Sorrow Behind the Bamboos)	6	VTV Film Prod.	Bạch Diệp (director); Vân Thảo (writer); Tiến Đạt, Lê Mai, Hà Văn Trọng, Khánh Huyền, Phú Thăng, Thu An, Trần Hạnh, Phạm Bằng, Trung Anh, Diễm Hương, Thùy Hương, Bích Ngọc, Tùng Dương...	'Vui buồn sau lũy tre' theme song by Vành Khuyên	Drama, Rural, Political	
2-9 Jul; Fri/Fri	Phố làng (Village Street)	2	VTV Film Prod.	Tạ Ngọc Bảo...		Rural, Drama	Adapted from Nguyễn Hữu Nhàn's short story of the same name
16 Jul; Fri	Followed by the playback of Chuyện không đăng báo (Story That's Not On The News). The drama was first released on VTV3 in Nov 1996.						
23 Jul; Fri	Quê nội (Father's Home)	1 (74′)	VTV Film Prod.	Bùi Huy Thuần (director); Hà Liên (writer); Thu Trang, Ngọc Diệp, Thu Hương, Khánh Thương, Trần Thạch, Hoàng Yến, Hồng Lựu, Hữu Mười, Đức Thuận, Vũ Tăng, Quế Hằng, Đình Huy, Anh Thương, Hữu Hải...		Drama, Rural	
27 Jul; Tue	Sĩ quan dự bị (Preparatory Soldier)	1 (72′)	VTV Film Prod.	Nguyễn Danh Dũng (director); Mai Đức (writer); Trần Tiệp, Ngọc Tản, Như Trang, Công Lý, Tuấn Kịch, An Ninh, Hải Điệp, Mai Hòa, Hồng Điệp, Hồng Quân, Hồ Lan, Lê Tuấn...		Drama, Rural, Post-war	Adapted from Dương Duy Ngữ's short story 'Ông Mạnh'. Produced in occasion of the War Invalids And Martyrs Day.
30 Jul; Fri	Followed by the playback of Quán nhỏ (Little Stalls). The drama was first released on VTV3 in Dec 1998.						
18-19 Aug; Wed-Thu	Followed by the playback of two-part feature film franchise Sao tháng Tám (The August Star) to celebrate the August Revolution. The films was released in 1976.						
20 Aug; Fri	Câu chuyện mùa xuân (Spring Story)	1 (80′)	VTV Film Prod.	Đỗ Thanh Hải (director); Thuận Châu (writer); Vũ Mai Huê, Thu Hằng, Minh Thông, Phú Thăng, Trần Hạnh, Thu Huyền, Lan Minh, Thu Vân, Hoài Vũ, Lan Phượng, Mai Lâm, Thu Hường, Đức Anh...		Marriage, Drama, Psychological	Adapted from Nguyễn Thị Ngọc Tú's short story 'Vô đề'
27 Aug-5 Sep; Fri/Wed-Sun	Followed by the playback of Hai người trở lại trung đoàn (The Two Who Returned to the Regiment), 3 episodes. The drama was first released on BTV1 in 1997.						
17-29 Sep; Fri/Mon-Wed	Những mảnh đời có thật (Those Lives Are Real)	3				Drama	
3 Oct; Sun	Dòng sông Lô vẫn trôi (Lô River Still Flows)	1 (80′)		Nguyễn Hinh Anh (director); Bùi Tiến Quý (writer); Quang Thiện, Ngọc Thoa, Công Bẩy, Hồ Lan, Xuân Nam, Kim Thoa, Thế Bình, Như Trang, Khôi Nguyên, Hồng Điệp...	Trường ca sông Lô - instrumental only (Epic Song of Lô River); Composed by Văn Cao	Post-war, Drama	

=== Friday night dramas ===
Starting from first full week of October, Vietnamese dramas was aired periodically around 21:00 on every Friday night on VTV1.

- Note: The time slot was delayed on 31 Dec due to special event.

Broadcast	Title	Eps.	Prod.	Cast and crew	Theme song(s)	Genre	Notes
8 Oct-19 Nov	Followed by Những nẻo đường phù sa (The Alluvial Roads), episode 24 to episode 30 (End).						
26 Nov-3 Dec	Người bị từ chối (The One Who Get Refused)	2 (84′)	VTV Film Prod.	Nguyễn Thế Hồng (director); Trần Vịnh (writer); Ngọc Dung, Lan Hương, Hạnh Đạt, Ngọc Tuyết, Mai Phương, Tuấn Anh, Mai Hoa...		Drama	Adapted from short story of the same name by Văn Phan
10-17 Dec	Bụi vàng (Yellow Dust)	2	VTV Film Prod.	Mạc Văn Chung (director); Lê Công Hội (writer); Vĩnh Xương, Mai Hương, Xuân Điệp, Hồng Điệp, Xuân Nam, Bảo Ninh, Quốc Khánh, Ngọc Dung, Phát Triệu...		Drama	
22-24 Dec	Đốm lửa biên thùy (The Spark at the Frontier)	2	VTV Film Prod.	Vũ Trường Khoa (director); Hương Tuấn Vũ (writer); Linh Nga, Dương Mạc An Tôn, Hoàng Công, Trần Anh, Đình Mười, Thu Hương, Hồ Sỹ Cần, Trần Xuân Sơn, Triều Đại, Phan Thuần, Hồ Văn Nghệ, Hoàng Hùng, Thái Khắc Hà, Sầm Thức, Thế Anh...	'Đốm lửa biên thùy' theme song Composed by Vũ Thảo	Drama, Romance, Ethnic, Crime	Ep 1 airs on Wed. Produced in occasion of People's Army Day.

== For The First Time On VTV3 Screen dramas ==
These dramas were aired under the name of the program For The First Time On VTV3 Screen (Vietnamese: Lần đầu tiên trên màn ảnh VTV3).

Until 1 June, the program followed the schedule from previous year which it airs around 21:00 on every Tuesday night.

From 10 Jul to 22 Jul, the program was moved to Thursday night.

From 23 Jul to 24 Oct, the program released 2 issues per week with the time slot on every Friday & Sunday night.

Since 30 Oct, it changed one more time, reduced back to 1 issues per week with the time slot moved to Saturday afternoon.

Broadcast	Title	Eps.	Prod.	Cast and crew	Theme song(s)	Genre	Notes
5 Jan	Hạnh phúc giản đơn (Simple Happiness)	1		Hoàng Thu Hường...		Drama	
12 Jan-9 Feb	Cầu thang nhà A6 (Stairway of Tenement A6)	5 (80′)		Nguyễn Hữu Luyện (director & writer); Trịnh Thịnh, Lê Tuấn, Thanh Thủy, Quốc Khánh, Phát Triệu, Huyền Trang, Trung Anh, Ngân Hoa, Minh Quốc, Xuân Bắc, Anaa, Thanh Năng, Trần Đức, Tuyết Liên, Tuấn Minh, Lan Minh, Huệ Đàn, Hoài Thu, Phương Nhi, Thanh Nam, Thu Hằng...	Hà Nội mùa thu - instrumental only (Hanoi in the Autumn); Composed by Vũ Thanh	Drama, Slice-of-Life	
16 Feb	Ván cờ (Chess Game)	1		Nguyễn Hữu Trọng (director); Lê Công Hội (writer); Xuân Tùng, Minh Hiếu, Phạm Bằng, Hoàng Lan, Phát Triệu, Văn Toàn, Minh Nguyệt, Hồng Vân, Vũ Tăng...		Rural, Drama	Airs as a Tet drama in the 1st day of Lunar New Year
17 Feb-2 Mar	Người thổi tù và hàng tổng (Feel Good to Be a Meddler)	5 (80′)		Phi Tiến Sơn (director); Lê Công Hội (writer); Quốc Tuấn, Khánh Huyền, Văn Hiệp, Duy Hậu, Ngọc Tuyết, Đức Hải, Văn Tình, Ngọc Dung, Hồng Hạnh, Tiến Xương, Tiến Mộc, Ngọc Thoa, Trần Hạnh, Lê Mai, Nguyễn Ánh, Minh Nguyệt, Đức Long, Thu An, Sỹ Tiến, Minh Thu, Hoàng Mai, Minh Hằng, Xuân Thức, Hồng Điệp, Tiến Quang, Văn Thân, Văn Nhã, Đức Lương, Quang Mùi, Quang Hải, Tuấn Dương, Hùng Phong, Quốc Dũng, Quang Bích, Toàn Thổ, Lan Minh...		Rural, Comedy	First 3 eps air on the 2nd, 3rd, 4th of Tet Holiday as a Tet drama. Each ep has its own name.
9 Mar-20 Apr	Lập nghiệp (Career Settling)	7	VTV Film Prod.	Triệu Tuấn (director); Nguyễn Quang Vinh (writer); Trung Hiếu, Thu Hương, Tiến Quang, Thu Hoàn, Phạm Cường, Hương Thảo, Ngọc Tuyết, Bá Cường, Thu Hạnh, Hoàng Yến, Xuân Bổn, Huệ Đàn, Hương Giang, Kim Oanh, Hồng Minh, Hồng Chương, Tuyết Liên, Dân Anh, Thành An, Ngọc Huyền, Xuân Đồng, Xuân Anh, Vĩnh Xương...		Drama	
27 Apr-4 May	Mỗi thời của họ (Each Time of Them)	2 (80′)	VFS	Phạm Nhuệ Giang (director); Phạm Nhuệ Giang, Đỗ Trí Hùng (writers); Hà Văn Trọng, Ngân Hoa, Mai Phương, Thanh Quý, Thu An, Trần Lực, Nguyễn Thư...		Post-war, Drama	Produced in the occasion of the Reunification Day. Adapted from short story of the same name by Phạm Hoa.
11-18 May	Ngày mai (Tomorrow)	2 (70′)	Feature Film Studio I	Phạm Lộc (director); Thùy Dương Linh (writer); Quốc Tuấn, Quốc Trị, Chu Hùng, Xuân Tùng, Nguyệt Hằng...		Drama	
25 May	Người cha (The Father)	1				Drama, Family	
1-10 Jun	Mãnh lực phố phường (Intensity of the Streets)	2		Đặng Lưu Việt Bảo (director); Hoàng Quân (writer); Trần Hùng, Thúy Nga, Thu Thủy, Tuấn Minh, Quế Hằng, Hoàng Mai, Thùy Hương, Minh Thúy, Thu Hương, Việt Báo, Hồng Loan, Minh Tuấn, Thùy Trang...		Drama	Adapted from short story of the same name by Lê Hoài Nam. Moved to Thursday night since Ep 2.
17 Jun	Công việc đặc biệt (Special Job)	1 (77′)	VTV Film Prod.	Triệu Tuấn (director); Đỗ Trí Hùng (writer); Lưu Sa An Na, Đức Khuê, Văn Hiệp, Lê Tiệp, Phạm Bằng, Vũ Tăng, Hồng Đức, Thùy Hương, Thu Huyền, Hồng Chương, Khánh Ly, Bảo Ninh, Thu Hà...		Drama, Office	
24 Jun-1 Jul	Followed by the playback of Cầu thang tối (Dark Stairway), 2 episodes. The drama was first released on HTV7 in 1999 Tet holiday.						
8-22 Jul	Trở lại trần gian (Back to Earth)	3 (70′)		Phạm Thanh Phong (director); Nguyễn Xuân Hải (writer); Trần Minh Hiếu, Trang Phượng, Chu Hùng, Hoa Thúy, Quế Hằng, Tuấn Minh, Kim Hoàn, Ngọc Dung, Tùng Dương, Danh Thái...		Drama, Marriage, Crime	a.k.a Chuyên án "Trở lại trần gian"
23 Jul-6 Aug	Followed by the playback of Đất khách (Strange Land), 5 episodes. The drama was first released on HTV7 in 1999 Tet holiday.						
8 Aug-24 Oct	Cảnh sát hình sự (Criminal Police): File 1: Ngược dòng cái chết (Upstream of the Death); File 2: Nước mắt của mẹ (Mother's Tears); File 3: Truy đuổi tội phạm (Chasing Criminals); File 4: Cái chết con thiên nga (The Death of Swan); File 5: Kẻ giả danh (Impersonator)	20; F1: 3e F2: 4e F3: 4e F4: 5e F5: 4e	VTV Film Prod.	Nguyễn Khải Hưng (executive director); Phạm Thanh Phong, Trọng Trinh, Nguyễn Hữu Phần, Đỗ Thanh Hải (directors); Nguyễn Quang Thiều, Nguyễn Thành Phong, Trung Trung Đỉnh, Phạm Ngọc Tiến, Nguyễn Quang Lập (writers); Văn Báu, Hoàng Hải, Võ Hoài Nam, Hoa Thúy (main cast); Quế Hằng, Hữu Độ, Hoàng Thắng, Trần Đức, Thành An, Văn Hiệp, Lan Minh, Hoàng Bình, Thu Thủy, Giang Châu, Quang Thịnh, Hồng Vân, Vương Huỳnh, Lâm Tùng, Quang Lan, Hoàng Thanh, Thu Lệ, Tuyết Liên... (File 1 cast); Chu Hùng, Hoàng Yến, Hoàng Thắng, Mạnh Sinh, Ngô Hùng, Hoàng Lâm, Trọng Trinh, Hồng Nhung, Chí Kiên, Danh Nhân, Thanh Thủy, Ngọc Dung... (File 2 cast); Ngọc Thư, Hạnh Đạt, Hồ Trung, Thanh Thủy, Trần Nhượng, Thu Thủy, Hoàng Tuấn, Ngọc Thúy, Nam Cường, Phương Thanh, Anh Quân, Thế Công, Đức Long, Trần Kiểm, Tiến Quang... (File 5 cast)	Những bàn chân lặng lẽ (Quiet Steps) by Thùy Dung	Crime, Drama	Delayed 3 episodes on 15 Aug, 24 Sep & 22 Oct
30 Oct 1999- 1 Jan 2000	Followed by the playback of Giã từ dĩ vãng (Farewell to the Past), 10 episodes. The drama was first released on HTV7 in 1997.						

== VTV3 Sunday Literature & Art dramas ==
These dramas air in early Sunday afternoon on VTV3 as a part of the program Sunday Literature & Art (Vietnamese: Văn nghệ Chủ Nhật).

- Note: The airtime with an asterisk (*) at the end indicates that the broadcast order is undefined

Broadcast	Title	Eps.	Prod.	Cast and crew	Theme song(s)	Genre	Notes
3 Jan	Anh Chí "xếp hạng" (Chí, the Ranking Man)	1	VTV Film Prod.	Tùng Dương...		Comedy	
10 Jan	Tìm chồng (Finding the Husband)	1	VTV Film Prod.	Phạm Thanh Phong (director & writer); Văn Báu...		Drama	
17 Jan	Vết rạn chân tường (The Foot Wall Cracks)	1	VTV Film Prod.			Drama	
24 Jan	Hoa trạng nguyên (Poinsettia Flower)	1 (70′)	VTV Film Prod.	Đỗ Chí Hướng (director); Đỗ Hồng Ngọc (writer); Bùi Bài Bình, Phạm Bằng, Văn Hiệp, Quốc Khánh, Vân Anh, Thu An, Vũ Tăng, Đức Mẫn, Khánh Toàn, Bích Thủy, Thúy Hiền, Ngọc Bích, Diệp Bích, Hồng Tuấn, Văn Uy, Diệp Kỳ, Đức Hiển...		Drama, Slice-of-Life, Business	Adapted from short story of the same name by Vũ Hải Sơn
31 Jan	Một chuyện tình (A Love Story)	1 (70′)	VTV Film Prod.	Đức Hải, Hoa Thúy, Ngọc Dung...		Romance, Drama	Based on Hồ Văn Thái's short story 'Những cuộc kiếm tình'
7 Feb-21 Mar*	Thăng bằng (Balance)	1 (75′)	VTV Film Prod.	Vũ Minh Trí (director & writer); Dương Mạc An Tôn, Vũ Mai Huê, Lê Mai, Hà Văn Trọng, Xuân Bắc, Hồng Quang, Chí Nghĩa, Tuấn Hùng, Kim Thoa, Thu Hương, Diệu Thúy, Thu Điệp, Thu Vân, Ngọc Lâm, Văn Xưởng, Lan Phượng, Hồng Hạnh, Thu Huyền, Tùng Dương, Mạnh Hùng, Quốc Long, Văn Tùng...	Lời thì thầm (The Whisper) by Vũ Mai Huê & Mùa Xuân band	Romance, Comedy, Drama	
7 Feb-21 Mar*	Đường về (Wayback)	1	VTV Film Prod.	Lê Cường Việt (director); Nguyễn Quyền (writer); Trọng Trinh, An Chinh, Hoàng Yến, Thu Hương, Thanh Khoa, Anh Thái, Mai Phương, Quý Đông, Anh Tuấn, Quốc Dân, Lan Điệp, Bích An...		Drama, Marriage	
7 Feb-21 Mar*	Trở lại chùa Dâu (Back to Dâu Pagoda)	1	VTV Film Prod.	Hữu Mười (director); Tùng Dương...		Drama, Slice-of-Life	
7 Feb-21 Mar*	Về quê ăn giỗ (Coming Rural Homeland for the Death Anniversary)	1	VTV Film Prod.	Vũ Hồng Sơn (director); Hoàng Dũng, Quốc Khánh, Hồng Giang, Công Lý, Văn Hiệp, Bá Cường,...	Itsuka Hoshi no Umi de by Satoko Shimonari	Comedy, Rural	
7 Feb-21 Mar*	Ngôi đền thiêng (The Sacred Temple)	1	VTV Film Prod.	Trần Vịnh (director); Phạm Ngọc Tiến (writer); Nguyễn Đình Thơ, Nguyễn Ngọc Đặng; Chấn Hưng, Thiên Kiều, Hồng Lâm, Phương Nam, Trần Văn Tuyên, Tuyết Anh, Minh Đăng, Hoa Lài, Ngọc Ánh, Trần Dũng, Tam Anh, Anh Tuấn, Lê Thu Hà...	Hồn tử sĩ (Spirit of the Fallen Warrior) Ai yêu Bác Hồ Chí Minh hơn thiếu niên nhi đồng (Who loved Uncle Ho Chi Minh more than the Children?) by VOV orchestra and choir	Drama, Post-war, Historical	
28 Mar-25 Apr	Đội đặc nhiệm nhà C21 (The Special Force of Tenement C21)	5 (75′)	VTV Film Prod.	Vũ Hồng Sơn (director); Lê Tấn Hiển (writer); Nông Thu Trang, Hồng Anh, Tùng Lâm, Quang Tú, Thanh Hải, Đức Thịnh, Tuấn Long (main cast); Văn Bốn, Anh Tuấn, An Thuận, Trần Đức, Thanh Huyền, Thúy Ngân, Việt Thắng, Ngọc Quốc, Vân Hà, Phú Thăng, Phú Đôn, Hữu Chỉnh, Mộng Phương, Ngọc Hà, Mai Diễm, Thành Quân, Anh Quân, Thùy Hương, Quốc Toàn, Văn Mẫn, Minh Tuấn, Hà Anh, Anh Tuấn, Thành Tuấn, Thành Minh, Văn Quý, Lan Minh, Thành An, Xuân Tiên, Thu Hương, Tuấn Minh, Mai Hạnh, Ngọc Bích...	Tuổi thần tiên (Fairy Age) by the main cast	Children, Crime, Comedy, Slice-of-Life	Produced in 1998. Adapted from the series 'Nhóm đặc nhiệm nhà C21' by Lê Tấn Hiển. Originally 16 volumes but only 5 were produced.
2 May	Những người săn lùng cái đẹp (Those Who Hunt For Beauty)	1	VTV Film Prod.	Nguyễn Khải Hưng (director); Đỗ Trí Hùng (writer); Chí Trung, Công Lý, Trịnh Thịnh, Đức Hải, Văn Hiệp, Quốc Khánh, Cao Khương, Hoàng Yến, Minh Vượng, Trần Tiến, Hữu Độ, Kim Thoa, Thu Thủy...		Comedy	
9 May*	Chuyện ngày xưa (Story of the Past)	1 (86′)	VTV Film Prod.	Đỗ Thanh Hải (director); Lê Ngọc Minh (writer); Phạm Cường, Quách Thu Phương, Thu Hương, Xuân Bắc, Quỳnh Anh, Chí Nghĩa, Hương Tươi, Vân Anh, Thu Hà, Trần Bộ, Ngọc Thu, Mạnh Hoàng, Lan Phượng, Mạnh Hòa, Xuân Lai, Ngọc Trung...		Drama, Romance	
16-23 May	Đường tới thiên đàng (Road to Heaven)	2 (80′)	VTV Film Prod.	Bạch Diệp (director); Đỗ Trí Hùng (writer); Lê Vi, Đức Sơn, Cyril Lapointe, Hoàng Dũng, Bé Nhi, Hà Văn Trọng, Ngọc Thoa...	'Đường tới thiên đàng' theme song by Đức Long	Marriage, Drama, Romance	
30 May*	Phóng sinh (Set It Free)	1	VTV Film Prod.	Mạc Văn Chung (director & writer); Hồ Tú, Ngọc Dung, Quốc Khánh, Thùy Dung, Hoàng Yến, Lê Tuấn, Hồ Liên, Hoàng Tuấn, Anh Tuấn, Đình Chiến, Phú Đôn, Đức Mẫn, Văn Minh, Hồng Hạnh, Hải Yến, Tuyết Minh, Văn Tuấn, Quỳnh Phương, Sỹ Cường, Quốc Trịnh, Văn Bắc...		Drama, Thriller	A part of Trần Cung the series
6 Jun	Cha tôi (My Father)	1	VTV Film Prod.	Châu Minh Xuyến (director & writer); Nguyễn Đình Thơ, Chấn Cường, Minh Hạnh, Nguyễn Hoa, Lệ Hằng, Lan Hương, Quỳnh Anh...		Drama, Family	Adapted from short story 'Bên bóng Thái Sơn' by Nguyễn Thái Hải
13-20 Jun*	Ranh giới mong manh (Fragile Boundary)	2 (75′)	VTV Film Prod.	Vũ Minh Trí (director); Nguyễn Thị Hồng Ngát (writer); Anh Dũng, Duy Hậu, Võ Hoài Nam, Vũ Mai Huê, Hữu Độ, Phương Thanh, Tuấn Quang, Thu Hải, Huyền Thanh, Anh Tuấn, Phạm Bằng, Trần Đức, Đặng Tất Bình, Hải Phong, Phạm Lân, Mỹ Linh, Kim Xuyến...		Drama	
27 Jun-4 Jul	Khoảng cách (Distance)	2	VTV Film Prod.	Bạch Diệp (director); Trần Lâm Thi (writer); Hà Văn Trọng, Minh Châu, Mai Thu Huyền, Quốc Khánh, Lan Hương 'Bông', Phú Thăng, Linh Nga...	Kỷ niệm không em, kỷ niệm không hồn (Memory Without You, Memory Has No Soul) by Lê Dung	Family, Drama, Romance	
11 Jul-15 Aug*	Nhịp tim lầm lạc (Errant Heartbeat)	1 (65′)	VTV Film Prod.	Lê Đức Tiến (director); Lê Ngọc Minh (writer); Hương Thảo, Xuân Bắc, Bùi Thu Hạnh, Vân Hà, Phạm Hồng Minh, Minh Đức, Duy Hậu, Ngọc Thu, Mai Hòa, Mai Hương, Hương Giang, Duy Anh, Đình Hồng, Quang Thắng, Đức Quỳnh, Văn Quang, Phạm Minh, Mai Liên, Huy Quang, Quốc Trung...	'Nhịp tim lầm lạc' theme song by Lan Hương	Drama, Romance	
11 Jul-15 Aug*	Đi qua cổng làng (Walk Through the Village Gate)	2	VTV Film Prod.	Mạc Văn Chung (director); Hà Vinh (writer); Mai Hương, Lê Tuấn, Hồ Liên, Quốc Khánh, Phát Triệu, Phương Thanh, Bá Cường, Hồng Vân, Việt Quang, Thanh Nhàn...		Rural, Drama	
11 Jul-15 Aug*	Đi tìm ngôi sao (Searching for the Star)	1	VTV Film Prod.	Đỗ Trí Hùng (writer); Công Lý, Thu Hường...		Comedy	
11 Jul-15 Aug*	Chuyện bên sông (Story By the River)	2	VTV Film Prod.	Nguyễn Danh Dũng (director); Lê Công Hội (writer); Ngọc Dung, Dũng Nhi, Xuân Bắc, Thu Hương, Thanh Duyên, Thanh Tú, Trần Hạnh, Hoàng Yến...		Drama	
22 Aug	Giai điệu mùa thu (Autumn Melody)	1	VTV Film Prod.	Đỗ Chí Hướng (director); Lưu Thiên Hương...		Drama, Scholastic, Musical	
29 Aug	Ba lẻ một (301)	1 (68′)	VTV Film Prod. and BTV	Nguyễn Khải Hưng (director); Ngọc Hà (writer); Minh Châu, Đức Sơn, Hai Nhất, Thùy Liên, Trọng Hải, Chi Bảo, Trung Dũng, Cao Minh Đạt, Quyền Linh, Thu Nga, Minh Toàn...		Drama, War	
5 Sep*	Dấu chân thầm lặng (Quiet Footprint)	1 (80′)	VTV Film Prod.	Lê Tuấn Anh (director); Nguyễn Khải (writer); Phạm Cường, Ngọc Huyền, Minh Tuấn, Mai Duyên, Thu An, Thùy Ngân, Bùi Lê Vũ, Chí Nghĩa, Quang Lân, Vũ Mai Huê, Đàm Quang, Lê Đức, Ngọc Tản, Phạm Hưng, Thanh Hùng, Nguyễn Kiểm, Lê Bình, Hồng Điệp, Quốc Khánh...		Drama, Slice-of-Life, Family, Crime	
12 Sep	Cha và con (Father and Son)	1	VTV Film Prod.	Trần Hoài Sơn (director); Nguyễn Quyến (writer); Chu Hùng, Trịnh Đức Dũng, Ngô Hùng, Duy Hưng, Hồng Quân, Hồ Lan, Thế Bình, Bình Trọng, Phú Thăng, Hồng Điệp, Phương Tâm, Ngọc Huyền, Trần Thơm, Tuấn Anh, Minh Tân, Mạnh Thắng, Nam Anh, Việt Anh, Trà My...		Drama, Slice-of-Life	Adapted from Anh Đào's short story 'Cha con bụi'
19 Sep-10 Oct	Ông bầu ca nhạc (A Music Showman)	4 (70′)	VTV Film Prod.	Nguyễn Anh Tuấn (director); Đặng Huy Quyển, Nguyễn Anh Tuấn (writers); Trần Thạch, Lưu Sa An Na, Linh Nga, Lê Thu Hà, Quang Thiện, Xuân Bắc, Ngọc Tân, Cường Việt, Huệ Đàn, Văn Cường, Mạnh Cường, Phú Thăng, Văn Thị Đáng, Thanh Hằng, Anh Tú, Huy Hoàng, Vân Hà, Hồng Chương, Hồng Quân, Thế Như, Tuấn Minh, Trần Tiệp, Tuấn Dương, Tiến Dũng, Hoàng Long, Hoàng Anh...		Drama, Business, Musical	
17 Oct	Nơi trở về (Where to Come Back)	1	VTV Film Prod.			Drama	
24-31 Oct	Chiến dịch "Khoai cụ Khóm" (Relic Verification Campaign)	2	VTV Film Prod.	Phi Tiến Sơn, Nguyễn Hữu Trọng (directors); Công Lý, Đức Khuê, Thu Hường...		Rural, Comedy, Drama	
7-14 Nov	Nắng hoàng hôn (Sunset's Light)	2 (75′)	VTV Film Prod.	Trọng Trinh (director); Lịch Du (writer); Ngọc Thoa, Ngọc Tản, Thu Huyền, Thu Hà, Hồng Minh, Mai Phương, Giang Minh, Mỹ Linh, Phạm Bằng, Tuyết Mai, Phương Linh, Kim Thoa, Thu Hạnh, Khánh Ly, Thu Hương...		Drama, Family	
21-28 Nov	Tiếng xưa (The Old Sound)	2	VTV Film Prod.	Nguyễn Hữu Luyện (director); Thu Hường (writer); Trần Đức, Điệp Vân, Diệp Bích, Trần Tùng, Phát Triệu, Tuyết Mai, Công Lý, Đức Sơn, Thanh Thúy, Huệ Đàn, Thúy Đạt, Thanh Tùng, Ngọc Dung, Nhật Tiến, Bích Vân, Văn Khuê...	Hà Nội, một trái tim hồng (Hanoi, A Warm Heart); Composed by Nguyễn Đức Toàn: instrumental only	Marriage, Family, Drama, Musical	
5-19 Dec	Cây đời (The Tree of Life)	3	VTV Film Prod.			Drama	
26 Dec	Quà biếu phiêu lưu ký (Adventure of the Gift)	1	VTV Film Prod.	Đức Hải, Minh Hằng, Công Lý, Phương Thúy, Trịnh Mai, Phạm Bằng, Minh Vượng...		Comedy	

== See also ==
- List of dramas broadcast by Vietnam Television (VTV)
- List of dramas broadcast by Hanoi Radio Television (HanoiTV)
- List of dramas broadcast by Vietnam Digital Television (VTC)
