= List of Vietnamese submissions for the Academy Award for Best International Feature Film =

Best International Feature Film submissions from Vietnam

Highlights
- Debut: 1993
- Submissions: 23
- Nominations: 1
- Oscar winners: none

Vietnam has submitted films for the Academy Award for Best International Feature Film since 1993. The award (Note: The category was changed to the Academy Award for Best International Feature Film in April 2019, after the Academy deemed the word "Foreign" to be outdated.) is presented annually by the U.S. Academy of Motion Picture Arts and Sciences (AMPAS) to a feature-length motion picture produced outside the United States that contains primarily non-English dialogue. It was not created until the 1956 Academy Awards, in which a competitive Academy Award of Merit, known as the Best Foreign Language Film Award, was introduced for non-English speaking films, and has been given annually since.

As of 2026, Vietnam was nominated only once for The Scent of Green Papaya (1993). It was the first nomination received by a Southeast Asian country in the category.

== Submissions ==
The AMPAS has invited the film industries of various countries to submit their best film for the Academy Award for Best International Feature Film since 1956, while The International Feature Film Committee oversees the process and reviews all the submitted films. They vote via secret ballot to determine the five nominees for the award.

The Vietnamese submission is chosen by the Ministry of Culture, Sports and Tourism (MCST), formerly the Ministry of Culture and Information, since 2006. The MCST appoints a council to choose one film among those released that year to be submitted as Vietnam's official entry the following year. The council works on the principle of public discussion and votes via secret ballot—the chosen film must attain the highest score on a 10-point scale and the average above 9 points. The chosen films, along with their English subtitles, are sent to the AMPAS.

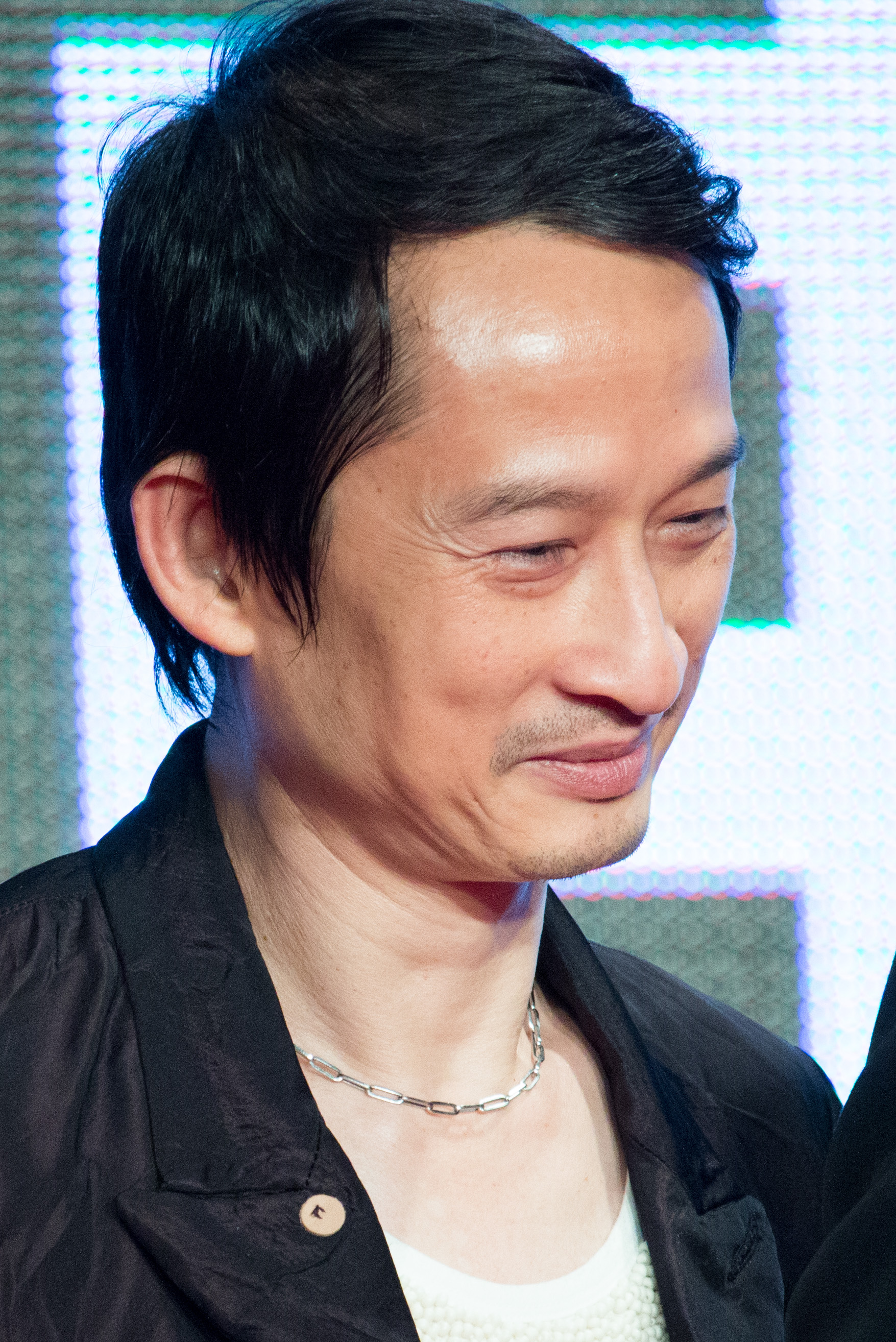
Trần Anh Hùng has represented Vietnam twice in the category

Trần Anh Hùng's The Scent of Green Papaya (1993) was Vietnam's submission for the 66th Academy Awards. Despite the film being financed and co-produced in France, Hùng asked permission to represent Vietnam, as it uses mainly Vietnamese language and the characters, also portrayed by Vietnamese actors. It is the only Vietnamese film to secure a nomination, and was the first nomination received by a Southeast Asian country in the category. The Scent of Green Papaya and the three subsequent submissions—Hồ Quang Minh's Gone, Gone Forever Gone (1996), Tony Bui's Three Seasons (1999), and Hùng's Vertical Ray of the Sun (2000)—were directed by overseas Vietnamese directors and chosen without any support councils, deriving solely from the directors' relationship with foreign partners. Of all four, only Gone, Gone Forever Gone was domestically funded. In September 2003, the Ministry of Culture and Information decided to send Đỗ Minh Tuấn's Foul King, a film entirety produced by Vietnamese, to compete in the category. It was not, however, included on the final list announced by the AMPAS in October.

Vietnam initially received the AMPAS' invitation to participate in the competition in 2006, when a requirement was introduced that films needed to be commercially released for at least seven consecutive days in a movie theater in its respective country during the eligibility period. The Buffalo Boy was the first selection by the Ministry of Culture and Information following the invitation. The ministry was merged into the MCST in 2007, who has since decided the submissions annually.

In 2008, Black Forest (Rừng đen) was the only film submitted to an open call for entries but was deemed ineligible since it had not been screened in a commercial cinema per AMPAS requirements. Similarly, the MCST chose not make an entry in 2013, when the only available film Blood Letter (Thiên mệnh anh hùng) did not meet the release time. Vietnam also chose not make a 2010 entry because the films reviewed did not meet the requirements; while in 2014, they did not receive any invitation from the AMPAS for the first time since 2006.

Below is a list of the films that have been submitted by Vietnam for review by the Academy for the award by year and the respective Academy Awards ceremony.

Year (Ceremony)	Film title used in nomination	Original title	Director(s)	Result
1993 (66th)	The Scent of Green Papaya	Mùi đu đủ xanh	Trần Anh Hùng	Nominated (Note: Lost to the Spanish film Belle Epoque.)
1996 (69th)	Gone, Gone Forever Gone	Bụi hồng	Hồ Quang Minh	Not nominated
1999 (72nd)	Three Seasons	Ba mùa	Tony Bui	Not nominated
2000 (73rd)	Vertical Ray of the Sun	Mùa hè chiều thẳng đứng	Trần Anh Hùng	Not nominated
2003 (76th)	Foul King (Note: The film's title was not on the final list. It was screened out of competition at the Palm Springs International Film Festival in 2003 under the title Foul King. Elsewhere, it was mentioned by titles loosely translated from Vietnamese as The King of the Landfill, King of the Rubbish Dumps, or Garbage Dump King.)	Vua bãi rác	Đỗ Minh Tuấn	Not on the final list
2005 (78th)	The Buffalo Boy	Mùa len trâu	Nguyễn Võ Nghiêm Minh	Not nominated
2006 (79th)	Story of Pao (Note: Also shortlisted for the submission was Living in Fear (Sống trong sợ hãi).)	Chuyện của Pao	Ngô Quang Hải	Not nominated
2007 (80th)	The White Silk Dress	Áo lụa Hà Đông	Lưu Huỳnh	Not nominated
2009 (82nd)	Don't Burn (Note: Other shortlisted films were Beautiful in Every Centimeter (Đẹp từng centimet); Saving The Death (Giải cứu thần chết); Passport to Love (Chuyện tình xa xứ); 14 Days (14 ngày); and The Legend Is Alive (Huyền thoại bất tử).)	Đừng đốt	Đặng Nhật Minh	Not nominated
2011 (84th)	The Prince and the Pagoda Boy (Note: Other shortlisted films were The Floating Lives (Cánh đồng bất tận) and The Musician at the Dragon Citadel (Long thành cầm giả ca).)	Khát vọng Thăng Long	Lưu Trọng Ninh	Not nominated
2012 (85th)	The Scent of Burning Grass (Note: Also shortlisted for the submission was Love Puzzles (Cưới ngay kẻo lỡ).)	Mùi cỏ cháy	Nguyễn Hữu Mười	Not nominated
2015 (88th)	Jackpot (Note: Other shortlisted films were Flapping in the Middle of Nowhere (Đập cánh giữa không trung); Triple Troubles (Bộ ba rắc rối); Rise (Hương Ga); Farewell, Berlin Wall (Quyên); Gentle (Dịu dàng); and Lost Eyes (Hiệp sĩ mù).)	Trúng số	Dustin Nguyen	Not nominated
2016 (89th)	Yellow Flowers on the Green Grass (Note: Other shortlisted films were Yen's Life (Cuộc đời của Yến); Tracer (Truy sát); I'll Wait (Có bao giờ yêu nhau); and Zodiac 12: 5 Steps of Love (12 chòm sao: Vẽ đường cho Yêu chạy).)	Tôi thấy hoa vàng trên cỏ xanh	Victor Vu	Not nominated
2017 (90th)	Father and Son (Note: Other shortlisted films were The Way Station (Đảo của dân ngụ cư) and Shoot (Sút).)	Cha cõng con	Lương Đình Dũng	Not nominated
2018 (91st)	The Tailor	Cô Ba Sài Gòn	Trần Bửu Lộc and Kay Nguyễn	Not nominated
2019 (92nd)	Furie (Note: Among the shortlisted films was The Immortal (Người bất tử).)	Hai Phượng	Lê Văn Kiệt	Not nominated
2020 (93rd)	Dreamy Eyes	Mắt biếc	Victor Vu	Not nominated
2021 (94th)	Dad, I'm Sorry	Bố già	Trấn Thành and Vũ Ngọc Đãng	Not nominated
2022 (95th)	578 Magnum (Note: Other shortlisted films were You and Trịnh (Em và Trịnh), Maika (Maika - Cô bé đến từ hành tinh khác), and Loved Child (Dân chơi không sợ con rơi).)	578: Phát đạn của kẻ điên	Lương Đình Dũng	Not nominated
2023 (96th)	Glorious Ashes	Tro tàn rực rỡ	Bùi Thạc Chuyên	Not nominated
2024 (97th)	Peach Blossom, Pho and Piano (Note: Also shortlisted for the submission was The Price of Happiness (Cái giá của hạnh phúc), Lật mặt 7: Một điều ước (Face off 7: One wish), and Mai.)	Đào, phở và piano	Phi Tiến Sơn	Not nominated
2025 (98th)	Red Rain (Note: Also shortlisted for the submission was Tunnel: Sun in the Dark (Địa đạo: Mặt trời trong bóng tối).)	Mưa đỏ	Đặng Thái Huyền	Not nominated
2026 (99th)	Spirit Guardians: The Last Secret of the First Emperor	Hộ linh tráng sĩ: Bí ẩn mộ vua Đinh	Nguyễn Phan Quang Bình	Pending

== See also ==
- List of Academy Award winners and nominees for Best International Feature Film
- List of Asian Academy Award winners and nominees
