= 35th Tokyo International Film Festival =

2022 Japanese film festival

- Official poster of the 35th Tokyo International Film Festival
- Opening film: Fragments of the Last Will
- Closing film: Living
- Location: Tokyo, Japan
- Founded: 1985
- Awards: Tokyo Grand Prix: The Beasts
- No. of films: 15 (In Competition)
- Festival date: 24 October–2 November 2022
- Website: 2022.tiff-jp.net/en/

Tokyo International Film Festival
- 36th 34th

The 35th Tokyo International Film Festival was a film festival that took place from 24 October to 2 November 2022. American writer-director Julie Taymor served as jury president. With The Beasts winning the Tokyo Grand Prix, the festival's top prize, Rodrigo Sorogoyen became the second Spanish director to achieve the prize, after Alejandro Amenábar in 1998.

The official poster for the festival was created by fashion designer Koshino Junko and is intended to represent "the theme of leaping forward" and the "creative explosion" in the film and fashion industries after the COVID-19 pandemic.

The festival opened with Fragments of the Last Will directed by Takahisa Zeze and closed with Living directed by Oliver Hermanus.

== Juries ==
=== Main Competition ===
- Julie Taymor, American director and writer
- Shim Eun-kyung, South Korean actress
- João Pedro Rodrigues, Portuguese director
- Katsumi Yanagishima, Japanese cinematographer
- Marie-Christine de Navacelle, French cultural curator and film programmer

=== Asian Futures ===
- Ayako Saito, Japanese professor at Meiji Gakuin University and president of the Japan Society of Image Arts and Sciences
- Soros Sukhum, Thai producer
- Akihiro Nishizawa, Japanese general manager of Tokyo Theatres Company

== Official Selection ==
=== Competition ===
The following films were selected to compete for the Tokyo Grand Prix.

English Title	Original Title	Director(s)	Production Country
1976		Manuela Martelli	Chile, Argentina
Ashkal		Youssef Chebbi	Tunisia, France
by the window	窓辺にて	Rikiya Imaizumi	Japan
Glorious Ashes	Tro Tàn Rực Rỡ	Bui Thac Chuyen	Vietnam, France, Singapore
Kaymak		Milcho Manchevski	North Macedonia, Denmark, Netherlands, Croatia
Life	Жизнь	Emir Baigazin	Kazakhstan
Manticore	Manticora	Carlos Vermut	Spain
Mountain Woman	山女	Takeshi Fukunaga	Japan, United States
Peacock Lament		Sanjeewa Pushpakumara	Sri Lanka, Italy
Tel Aviv/Beirut	Tel Aviv Beyrouth	Michale Boganim	Cyprus, France, Germany
The Beasts	As bestas	Rodrigo Sorogoyen	Spain, France
The Fabulous Ones	Le favolose	Roberta Torre	Italy
This Is What I Remember	Эсимде	Aktan Arym Kubat	Kyrgyzstan, Japan, Netherlands, France
World War III	جنگ جهانی سوم	Houman Seyyedi	Iran

=== Asian Future ===
The following films were selected to compete in the Asian Future section, which features films from Asian directors who have directed a maximum of three feature films.

English Title	Original Title	Director(s)	Production Country
A Light Never Goes Out	燈火闌珊	Anastasia Tsang	Hong Kong
A Place of Our Own	एक जगह अपनी	Ektara Collective	India
Butterflies Live Only One Day	Parvaneha Faqat Yek Rouz Zendegi Mikonand	Mohammadreza Vatandoust	Iran
Cloves & Carnations	Bir Tutam Karanfil	Bekir Bülbül	Turkey, Belgium
i ai		Mahito the People	Japan
Opium		Aman Sachdeva	India
Sayonara, Girls.	少女は卒業しない	Shun Nakagawa	Japan
Suddenly		Melisa Önel	Turkey
The Altman Method		Nadav Aronowicz	Israel
The Cord of Life	脐带	Qiao Sixue	China

=== Gala Selection ===
The following films were selected to be screened as part of the Gala Selection.

English Title	Original Title	Director(s)	Production Country
2 Women	あちらにいる鬼	Ryūichi Hiroki	Japan
Amsterdam		David O. Russell	United States
And So I'm at a Loss	そして僕は途方に暮れる	Daisuke Miura	Japan
Bardo, False Chronicle of a Handful of Truths	Bardo, falsa crónica de unas cuantas verdades	Alejandro González Iñárritu	Mexico
Detective vs Sleuths	神探大戰	Wai Ka-fai	Hong Kong
Don't Worry Darling		Olivia Wilde	United States
Ennio		Giuseppe Tornatore	Italy
Fairytale	Сказка	Alexander Sokurov	Russia, Belgium
Motherhood	母性	Ryūichi Hiroki	Japan
Phases of the Moon	月の満ち欠け	Ryūichi Hiroki	Japan
The Banshees of Inisherin		Martin McDonagh	United Kingdom
The Menu		Mark Mylod	United States
The Northman		Robert Eggers	United States
White Noise		Noah Baumbach	United States

=== World Focus ===
The following films were selected for the World Focus section, which focuses on international films.

English Title	Original Title	Director(s)	Production Country
2nd Chance		Ramin Bahrani	United States
A Confucian Confusion	獨立時代	Edward Yang	Taiwan
Convenience Store	Продукты 24	Michael Borodin	Russia, Slovenia, Turkey, Uzbekistan
Freedom on Fire: Ukraine's Fight for Freedom		Evgeny Afineevsky	Ukraine, United Kingdom, United States
Goodbye, Dragon Inn	不散	Tsai Ming-liang	Taiwan
Klondike	Клондайк	Maryna Er Gorbach	Ukraine, Turkey
The Pack; Maid	La Jauría; Camarera de Piso	Andrés Ramírez Pulido; Lucrecia Martel	Colombia, France; Mexico, Argentina
Pacifiction	Tourment sur les îles	Albert Serra	Spain, France, Germany, Portugal
R.M.N.		Cristian Mungiu	Romania, France, Belgium
Rebels of the Neon God	青少年哪吒	Tsai Ming-liang	Taiwan
Smoking Causes Coughing	Fumer fait tousser	Quentin Dupieux	France
Sparta		Ulrich Seidl	Austria, France, Germany
Autumn Days; Light; The Moon and the Tree; The Night		Tsai Ming-liang	Taiwan
Walking on Water; Journey to the West		Tsai Ming-liang	Taiwan
When the Waves Are Gone	Kapag Wala Nang Mga Alon	Lav Diaz	Philippines, France, Denmark, Portugal
Where Is This Street? or With No Before And After	Onde Fica Esta Rua? ou Sem Antes Nem Depois	João Pedro Rodrigues, João Rui Guerra da Mata	Portugal, France
Will-o'-the-Wisp	Fogo-Fátuo	João Pedro Rodrigues	Portugal, France

=== Youth ===
The following films were selected for the Youth section.

English Title	Original Title	Director(s)	Production Country
Nezouh		Soudade Kaadan	United Kingdom, Syria, France
Serviam: I Will Serve	Serviam – Ich will dienen	Ruth Mader	Austria
Private 2nd Class Norakuro: The Training	Norakuro nitôhei: Kyôren no maki	Yasuji Murata	Japan
Private 2nd Class Norakuro: The Drill	Norakuro nitôhei: Enshû no maki	Yasuji Murata	Japan
The Knockout		Mack Sennett	United States
Miss Fatty's Seaside Lovers		Roscoe Arbuckle	United States
The Hayseed		Roscoe Arbuckle	United States
The Water	El agua	Elena López Riera	Spain, Switzerland, France

=== Nippon Cinema Now ===
The following films were selected for Nippon Cinema Now, which aims to introduce previously released Japanese films to international audiences.

English Title	Original Title	Director(s)	Production Country
A Hundred Flowers	百花	Genki Kawamura	Japan
Brats, Be Ambitious!	雑魚どもよ、大志を抱け	Shin Adachi	Japan
My God, My God, Why Hast Thou Forsaken Me?	エリ・エリ・レマ・サバクタニ	Shinji Aoyama	Japan
Eureka	ユリイカ	Shinji Aoyama	Japan
I am a Comedian	アイアムアコメディアン	Fumiari Hyuga	Japan, South Korea
Lightning Over the Beyond	彼方の閃光	Yoshihiro Hanno	Japan
Remember to Breathe	わたしのお母さん	Masakazu Sugita	Japan
Shady Grove	シェイディー・グローヴ	Shinji Aoyama	Japan
Small, Slow But Steady	ケイコ 目を澄ませて	Shô Miyake	Japan
The Lump in My Heart	あつい胸さわぎ	Shingo Matsumura	Japan
Two Punks	チンピラ	Shinji Aoyama	Japan
Visit Me in My Dreams	はだかのゆめ	Sora Hokimoto	Japan

=== Japanese Animation ===
The following films were selected for the Japanese Animation section.

English Title	Original Title	Director(s)	Production Country
Break of Dawn	ぼくらのよあけ	Tomoyuki Kurokawa	Japan
Drifting Home	雨を告げる漂流団地	Hiroyasu Ishida	Japan
Harmagedon	幻魔大戦	Rintaro	Japan
Megazone 23	メガゾーン23	Noboru Ishiguro	Japan
Patlabor 2: The Movie	機動警察パトレイバー 2 the Movie	Mamoru Oshii	Japan
Sword Art Online the Movie: Ordinal Scale	劇場版 ソードアート・オンライン -オーディナル・スケール-	Tomohiko Itō	Japan
The Tunnel to Summer, the Exit of Goodbyes	夏へのトンネル、さよならの出口	Tomohisa Taguchi	Japan
Ultraseven (episodes 3, 6, 7, 14, 15, 26, 37, 39, 40, 42, 48, and 49)	ウルトラセブン	Toshihiro Iijima, Tetsuo Kinjo, Kazuho Mitsuta, Samaji Nonagase, Toshitsugu Suzuki	Japan

=== Japanese Classics ===
The following films were selected for the Japanese Classics section.

English Title	Original Title	Director(s)	Production Country
Door	ドア	Banmei Takahashi	Japan
Luminous Woman	光る女	Shinji Sōmai	Japan
The Guard From Underground	地獄の警備員	Kiyoshi Kurosawa	Japan
Typhoon Club	台風クラブ	Shinji Sōmai	Japan

=== TIFF Series ===
The following television series were selected for the TIFF Series section.

English Title	Original Title	Director(s)	Production Country
Gannibal (episodes 1 and 2)	ガンニバル	Shinzô Katayama	Japan
Irma Vep (episodes 1–8)		Olivier Assayas	France, United States
Kamen Rider Black Sun (episodes 1 and 2)	仮面ライダーBLACK SUN	Kazuya Shiraishi	Japan

== Awards ==
=== Competition ===
- Tokyo Grand Prix: The Beasts by Rodrigo Sorogoyen
- Special Jury Prize: World War III by Houman Seyyedi
- Award for Best Director: Rodrigo Sorogoyen for The Beasts
- Award for Best Actress: Aline Küppenheim for 1976
- Award for Best Actor: Denis Ménochet for The Beasts
- Award for Best Artistic Contribution: Peacock Lament by Sanjeewa Pushpakumara
- The Audience Award: by the window by Rikiya Imaizumi

=== Asian Future ===
- Asian Future Best Film Award: Butterflies Live Only One Day by Mohammadreza Vatandoust

=== Lifetime Achievement Award ===
- Lifetime Achievement Award: Teruyo Nogami
