= Gayesha Perera =

Sri Lankan actress and model

- Born: Wickramarachchige Gayesha Lakmali Perera; 24 October 1987 (age 38); Colombo, Sri Lanka
- Occupations: Sri Lankan Politician, Actress, Model, Former Miss Sri Lanka
- Years active: 2006 - Present
- Height: 5 ft 7 in (1.70 m)
- Spouse: Hasanjith Kuruppuarachchige
- Awards: Miss Sri Lanka for Miss International 2006; Miss Talant Of Miss Tourism Queen International 2009; Miss Personality Of Miss Asia Pacific World 2012; Miss National Costume Of Miss Asia Pacific World 2012
- Website: www.gayeshaperera.com

Gayesha Perera (Sinhala: ගයේෂා පෙරේරා; born 24 October 1987, as Wickramarachchige Gayesha Lakmali Perera) is a Sri Lankan politician, actress, tv host, model and beauty pageant titleholder. She was crowned Miss Sri Lanka for Miss International 2006 beauty pageant.

== Early life ==
Gayesha Perera was born in Colombo, Sri Lanka. She pursued her education at Subodha Balika Vidyalaya, Dehiwala, and later at Girls’ High School, Mount Lavinia. During her time at Girls’ High School, she served as a school prefect, demonstrating her leadership skills and dedication. She is married to Hasanjith Kuruppuarachchige, a well-known singer and businessman.

== Education ==
Gayesha holds a Diploma in Governance, Democratization, and Public Policy from the Colombo Institute of Social Sciences. She is currently pursuing a Diploma in Early Childhood Education at UCLA Extension.

== Miss Sri Lanka ==
In 2006 Gayesha won the Miss Sri Lanka for Miss International 2006 title and she represented the Sri Lanka at Miss International in China and Japan.

After 3 years, she qualified to compete at Miss Tourism Queen International 2009 pageant, which was held in the Wuhan, China,

At the Avirate Miss Sri Lanka for Miss Universe 2011 competition, Gayesha won the Miss Congeniality title.

In 2012, Gayesha proudly represented her country at the Miss Asia Pacific World beauty pageant held in South Korea, where she distinguished herself as a Top 6 finalist. Her exceptional charm and grace earned her the titles of Miss Personality and Best National Costume, showcasing her talent on an international stage.

The following year, in 2013, Gayesha continued to shine, competing in the Miss Supranational pageant in Belarus, where she secured a place among the Top 15 contestants.

Her remarkable achievements have etched her name in Sri Lankan history as one of the few beauty queens to represent her country at multiple prestigious pageants, bringing honor and glory to her homeland.

== Controversy ==
In 2010, Gayesha's movie *Flying Fish* provoked controversy in Sri Lanka, primarily due to its portrayal of the Sri Lanka Army. The government banned the film, claiming it brought shame to the Army.

Gayesha appeared at the Criminal Investigation Department (CID) of the Sri Lanka Police a couple of times for questioning about her role and acting, as well as any suspected involvement behind her performance.

Despite the controversy, Gayesha's acting received high praise, and the film won several awards at various film festivals around the world. Years later, Gayesha's role was nominated for Best Actress at the Derana Film Awards 2024, eleven years after the film's ban. and with Gayesha's entry into politics, her controversial character in this movie brought her critical notice.

== Politics ==
Gayesha Perera entered Sri Lankan politics after gaining attention due to her controversial character, which made headlines when her movie was banned. She began her political career with the Sri Lanka Freedom Party (SLFP) and comes from a political family actively involved in politics in Dehiwala-Mount Lavinia. She served as the Chairperson of the Dehiwala-Mount Lavinia SLFP Women’s Wing and was also a member of the SLFP National Women’s Wing. Throughout her career, she held various positions within the party.

In 2014, she attempted to run for the Western Provincial Council elections, but her nomination was rejected due to the controversial influence of party rivals. In 2017, she successfully ran for the Dehiwala-Mount Lavinia Municipal Council under the SLFP.

Gayesha is also well-known for her outspoken advocacy for women's and children's rights. She has actively campaigned against corrupt politicians and continues to fight for these causes in her political career.

== Filmography ==
Year	Film	Role	Director	Other notes
2009	Rama's Bridge	Seetha	Alexander Yuryevich Volkov	Russian Documentary Film
2010	Flying Fish	Wasana	Sanjeewa Pushpakumara	Banned in Sri Lanka
2015	Bonikka		Louie Vanderstraeten	Sinhala Romantic Film
2024	Sihinayaki Adare	hospital receptionist	Donald Jayantha	Sinhala Romantic Film
2024	Bambara Wasanthe	Nirasha	Donald Jayantha	Sinhala Romantic Film

== Teledrama ==
Teledrama	Role	Director	Broadcast
Nim Walalla		Kristi Shelton Fernando, Bennat Ratnayake	
Pas Mal Pethi			Sirasa TV
Oba Mageya		Janaka Suranjith	
Kinduru Kodewwa		Saman Fernando	
Denuwara Kirana		Saman Fernando	
Samanalee		Kumarasiri Abayakoon	
Kindurangana		Kumudu Wellassage	Sirasa TV
Sihina Sithuvam			Sirasa TV
Adara Ridma		Sanath Abeysekara	
Samanalunta Wedi Tiyanna		Pradeep Darmasiri	
Bonda Meedum	Minoli	Chandika Wijayasena	ITN
Dooli Pintaru	Leesa	Santhusa Liyanage	Rupavahini

== TV programs ==
Year	Program	Broadcast
2009-2010	Rasata Rasak	Sirasa TV
2010	Rasa Meewitha	Siyatha TV
2010-2011	Netra	Sirasa TV

== Music videos ==
Song	Artist
Adare Ma Niwalai	Amila Perera
Igilenna Thahanam Nam	Nirosha Wirajani
Pini Muthu Sulange	Uresha Ravihari

Gayesha Perera also appeared in Sirasa Dancing Stars reality show. And participated to Derana Star City season 1 reality show.
