= Gone, Gone Forever Gone =

1996 film

Gone, Gone, Forever Gone
- Directed by: Hồ Quang Minh
- Written by: Ngụy Ngữ
- Produced by: Hồ Quang Minh; Trần Thanh Hùng
- Starring: Phương Dung; Lê Anh Tuấn; Hoàng Phúc
- Cinematography: Lê Đình Ấn
- Edited by: Bùi Kim Hoàng
- Music by: Đặng Hữu Phúc
- Distributed by: Giải Phóng Film Studio; ZooDee Productions
- Release date: 9 September 1996 (TIFF)
- Running time: 85 minutes
- Country: Vietnam
- Language: Vietnamese

Gone, Gone, Forever Gone (Vietnamese: Bụi Hồng), also known as Gate, gate, paragate, is a 1996 Vietnamese drama film directed by Hồ Quang Minh. The film was selected as the Vietnamese entry for the Best Foreign Language Film at the 69th Academy Awards, but it was not nominated.

== Cast ==
- Phương Dung as Diệu Thuần
- Lê Tuấn Anh as Sơn
- Hoàng Phúc as Quang
- Nguyễn Thị Quý as Diệu Thông
- Anh Thư
- Lê Hoá as Diệu Vân
- Thuý Hoà as Điệu Tịnh Bình
- Nhật Cường
- Khánh Duy as Uy
- Thế Hà as Kiên
- Huỳnh Đắc Vinh
- Ngọc Bình
- Thuý Hồng as Diệu Thanh
- Lê Ngọc Tú
- Bảo Phúc
- Trương Thị Thuỷ
- Lê Công Đào
- Thanh Trì
- Thành Nguyên
- Văn Kiệp
- Ba Lân

== See also ==
- List of submissions to the 69th Academy Awards for Best Foreign Language Film
- List of Vietnamese submissions for the Academy Award for Best Foreign Language Film
