= Lê Lựu =

Vietnamese writer (1942–2022)

Lê Lựu (12 December 1942 – 9 November 2022) was a Vietnamese writer specializing in novels and short stories. He was a member of the Vietnam Writers Association from 1974 until his death. He was the director of the Culture and Entrepreneurs Centre in Hanoi.

His best known novel is Thời xa vắng. This was filmed by director Hồ Quang Minh, Le temps révolu, and released to the public in 2004 with music by Đặng Hữu Phúc.

== Works ==
- Ranh giới, 1979
- Thời xa vắng ("Time gone by," French "Le temps révolu,") 1986
- Sóng ở đáy sông, 1994
- Chuyện làng Cuội, 1991
- Người cầm súng, 1970
- Mở rừng, 1976
- Truyện ngắn Lê Lựu, 2003
