= Glorious Ashes =

- International release poster
- Vietnamese: Tro tàn rực rỡ
- Directed by: Bùi Thạc Chuyên
- Screenplay by: Bùi Thạc Chuyên
- Based on: Glorious Ashes by Nguyễn Ngọc Tư; Drifting Firewood by Nguyễn Ngọc Tư
- Produced by: Trần Thị Bích Ngọc
- Starring: Lê Công Hoàng; Juliet Bảo Ngọc Doling; Phương Anh Đào; Ngô Quang Tuấn; Ngô Phạm Hạnh Thúy; Thạch Kim Long; Nguyễn Thị Ngọc Hiệp; Mai Thế Hiệp
- Cinematography: Nguyễn K'Linh
- Edited by: Julie Béziau
- Music by: Tôn Thất An
- Production companies: An Nam Productions; Viet Vision; Fleur de Lys
- Distributed by: CGV
- Release dates: 24 October 2022 (Tokyo); 22 November 2022 (Nantes, France); 2 December 2022 (Vietnam)
- Running time: 117 minutes
- Countries: Vietnam; Singapore; France
- Language: Vietnamese
- Box office: 4,135 billion VND

Glorious Ashes (original title: Tro tàn rực rỡ) is a 2022 Vietnamese-language drama film directed and written by Bùi Thạc Chuyên. It is an adaptation of two short stories, Glorious Ashes (Tro tàn rực rỡ) and Drifting Firewood (Củi mục trôi về), taken from the Đảo (Island) short story collection by Vietnamese writer Nguyễn Ngọc Tư. The film has an ensemble cast including Lê Công Hoàng, Juliet Bảo Ngọc Doling, Phương Anh Đào, Ngô Quang Tuấn, Ngô Phạm Hạnh Thuý, Thạch Kim Long, Nguyễn Thị Ngọc Hiệp and Mai Thế Hiệp. Set in Thơm Rơm village of Cà Mau, the story revolves around three women, their journey of love and their efforts to keep their men. The imagery of fire and ashes appears throughout as a metaphor for the passion and longing of these women.

Glorious Ashes surpassed 27 other projects to win the top prize of $15,000 at the Asian Project Market, a division of the Busan International Film Festival, in 2017. The film also won the Inaugural Southeast Asia Co-Production Grant by the Singapore Film Commission in November 2019. It was then premiered at the 35th Tokyo International Film Festival and became the first Vietnamese film to compete for the festival's top prize, the Tokyo Grand Prix, in October 2022. The film won the Montgolfière d'or at the 2022 Three Continents Festival, won four awards at the 2023 Kite Awards and five awards at the 23rd Vietnam Film Festival, including the Golden Lotus Prize. In Vietnam, Glorious Ashes opened in theaters nationwide on December 2, 2022. The film was chosen as the Vietnamese entry for Best International Feature Film at the 96th Academy Awards.

== Plot ==
Set in the poor Mekong Delta coastal village of Thơm Rơm, the film follows the lives of three women, whose love lives are unusual and unique to their nature. The film is narrated from Hau's perspective, as she experiences life with a husband who only has eyes for another woman, and develops her growing friendship with her rival.

== Cast ==
- Lê Công Hoàng as Duong
- Juliet Bảo Ngọc Doling as Hau
- Phương Anh Đào as Nhan
- Ngô Quang Tuấn as Tam
- Ngô Phạm Hạnh Thuý as Loan
- Nguyễn Thị Ngọc Hiệp as Duong's mother
- Mai Thế Hiệp as Monk

Nguyễn Văn Thạch and Hoàng Thị Thuý appear as neighbors; Phạm Thị Hoa Lan appears as charcoal factory boss; Lê Ánh Hồng appears as Loan's aunty; Huỳnh Ngọc Tâm appears as old man in charcoal; Trương Vũ Phước appears as Hau's father; Phạm Văn Cường, Lý Văn Tiễn and Nguyễn Chí Hữu appear as workers in charcoal factory; Lê Phương Anh Dũng appears as boat captain; Kha Ngọc Hồng Hạnh appears as Nhan's daughter; Trần Minh Chi Nhân appears as singing man on boat; Uyên Nhi appears as Hau's daughter.

== Themes ==
Love is a topic that never gets old, especially when a woman loves. I am fascinated by the romanticism of Nguyễn Ngọc Tư's story. The love that women have for their men represents a special Asian cultural feature. It seems peaceful and quiet, but also incredibly powerful.

– Director Bùi Thạc Chuyên on Glorious Ashes.

Set in the poor Mekong Delta, the film portrays the love and pain of three women with their men. The imagery of fire and ashes appears throughout as a metaphor for the passion and longing to be "seen" of these women. Bùi Thạc Chuyên said he was fascinated by the power of love of women in the original story by Nguyễn Ngọc Tư.

== Production ==
The film is produced by An Nam Productions and distributed by CGV. It began principal photography in 2021.

== Release ==
Glorious Ashes was selected to compete for the Tokyo Grand Prix at the 35th Tokyo International Film Festival to be held from 24 October to 2 November 2022. It screened for the first time in Tokyo and subsequently had its French premiere at the Three Continents Festival in November 2022.

On 10 November 2022, Glorious Ashes had its premiere in Ho Chi Minh City before being released in Vietnam theatrically on 2 December.

== Reception ==
=== Critical response ===
Jordan Mintzer of The Hollywood Reporter, wrote "Premiering in competition at Tokyo, the film provides an intriguing look at a part of the world where the old ways, whether in farming, fishing or wives being completely subjected to their husbands’ every last whim, still dominate daily life. But the two-hour drama never quite rises above its earnest and weighty message, which makes it more of a thoughtful pedagogical item than a movie with serious market potential."

Wendy Ide of Screen Daily, describing it as "a thoughtful piece which is elevated by strong performances."

=== Accolades ===
Award	Date of ceremony	Category	Recipient(s)	Result	Ref.
Tokyo International Film Festival	November 2, 2022	Tokyo Grand Prix	Glorious Ashes	Nominated	
Three Continents Festival	November 27, 2022	Montgolfière d'or	Glorious Ashes	Won	
Da Nang Asian Film Festival	May 13, 2023	Best Film - Asian Film Competition	Glorious Ashes	Nominated	
Da Nang Asian Film Festival	May 13, 2023	Best Director - Asian Film Competition	Bùi Thạc Chuyên	Nominated	
Da Nang Asian Film Festival	May 13, 2023	Best Actress - Asian Film Competition	Juliet Bảo Ngọc Doling	Won	
Kite Awards	September 9, 2023	Feature Film	Glorious Ashes	Golden Kite	
Kite Awards	September 9, 2023	Best Director - Feature Film	Bùi Thạc Chuyên	Won	
Kite Awards	September 9, 2023	Best Leading Actress - Feature Film	Phương Anh Đào	Nominated	
Kite Awards	September 9, 2023	Best Supporting Actress - Feature Film	Ngô Phạm Hạnh Thuý	Won	
Kite Awards	September 9, 2023	Best Cinematography - Feature Film	Nguyễn K'Linh	Won	
Vietnam Film Festival	November 25, 2023	Lotus Prize - Feature Film	Glorious Ashes	Golden Lotus	
Vietnam Film Festival	November 25, 2023	Best Actress	Juliet Bảo Ngọc Doling	Nominated	
Vietnam Film Festival	November 25, 2023	Best Supporting Actor	Lê Công Hoàng	Won	
Vietnam Film Festival	November 25, 2023	Best Supporting Actress	Ngô Phạm Hạnh Thuý	Nominated	
Vietnam Film Festival	November 25, 2023	Best Director - Feature Film	Bùi Thạc Chuyên	Won	
Vietnam Film Festival	November 25, 2023	Best Screenplay - Feature Film	Bùi Thạc Chuyên	Nominated	
Vietnam Film Festival	November 25, 2023	Best Cinematography - Feature Film	Nguyễn K'Linh	Won	
Vietnam Film Festival	November 25, 2023	Best Original Score - Feature Film	Tôn Thất An	Won	
Vietnam Film Festival	November 25, 2023	Best Sound Design - Feature Film	Claire Anne Largeron	Nominated	
Face of The Year Awards	January 10, 2024	Best Film	Glorious Ashes	Nominated	
Face of The Year Awards	January 10, 2024	Best Director - Film	Bùi Thạc Chuyên	Nominated	
Face of The Year Awards	January 10, 2024	Best Supporting Actress - Film	Ngô Phạm Hạnh Thuý	Won	
Face of The Year Awards	January 10, 2024	Best Popular Actress - Film	Phương Anh Đào	Nominated	
Face of The Year Awards	January 10, 2024	Most Promising Actor/Actress - Film	Lê Công Hoàng	Nominated	
WeChoice Awards	January 27, 2024	Film of the Year	Glorious Ashes	Nominated	

== Gallery ==
Cast & crew of Glorious Ashes at the 2022 Tokyo International Film Festival

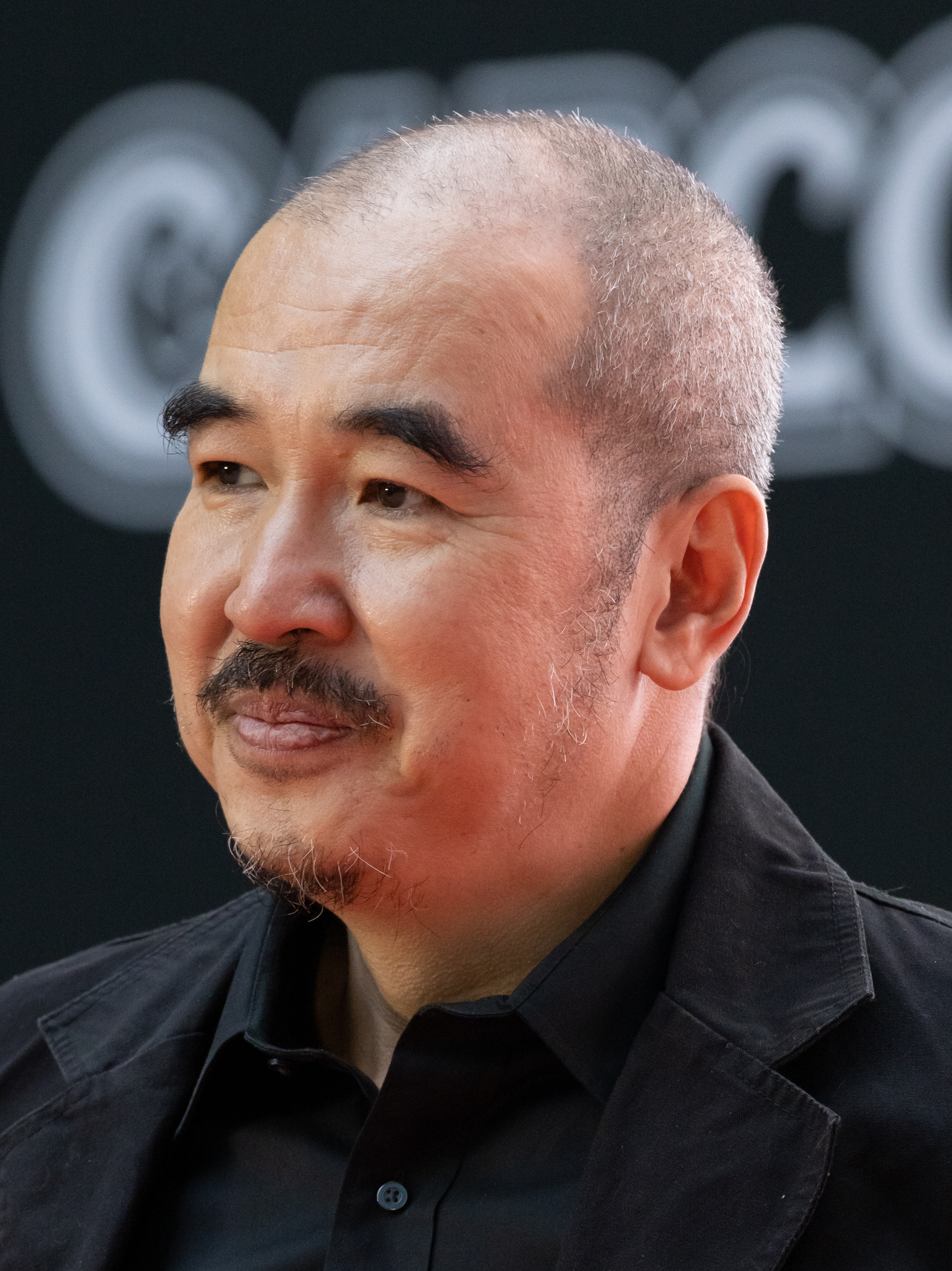
Director Bùi Thạc Chuyên

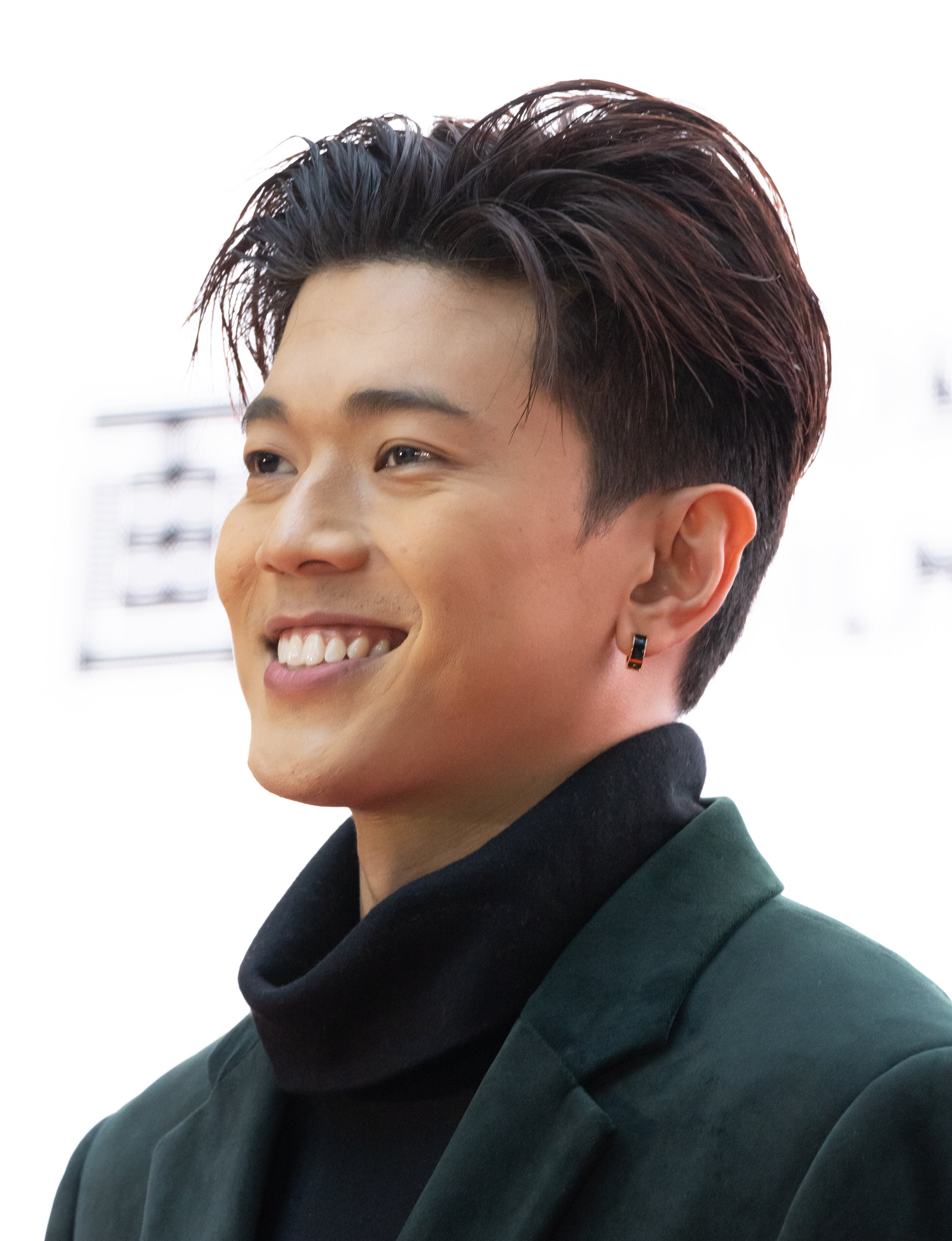
Lê Công Hoàng

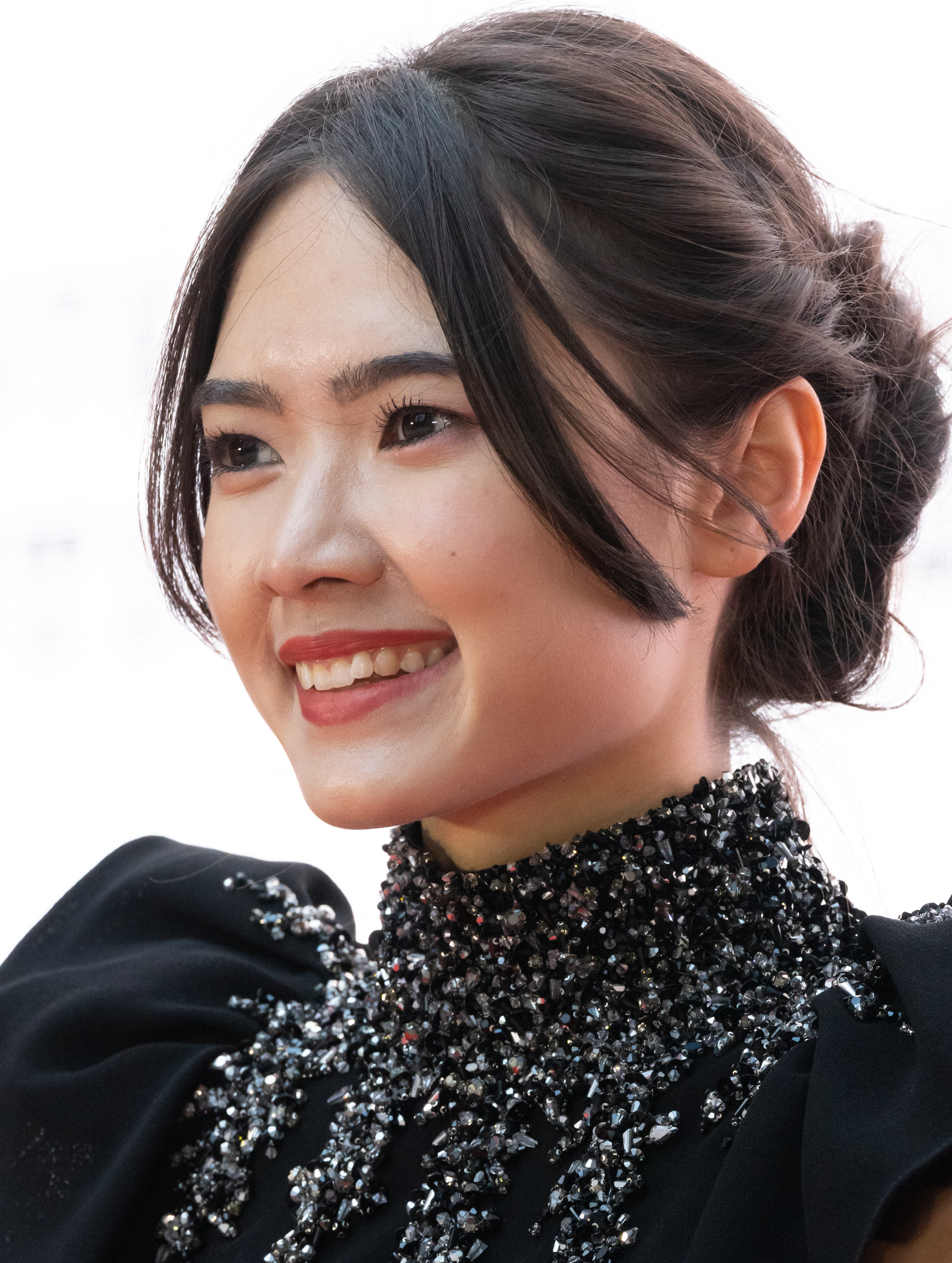
Juliet Bảo Ngọc Doling

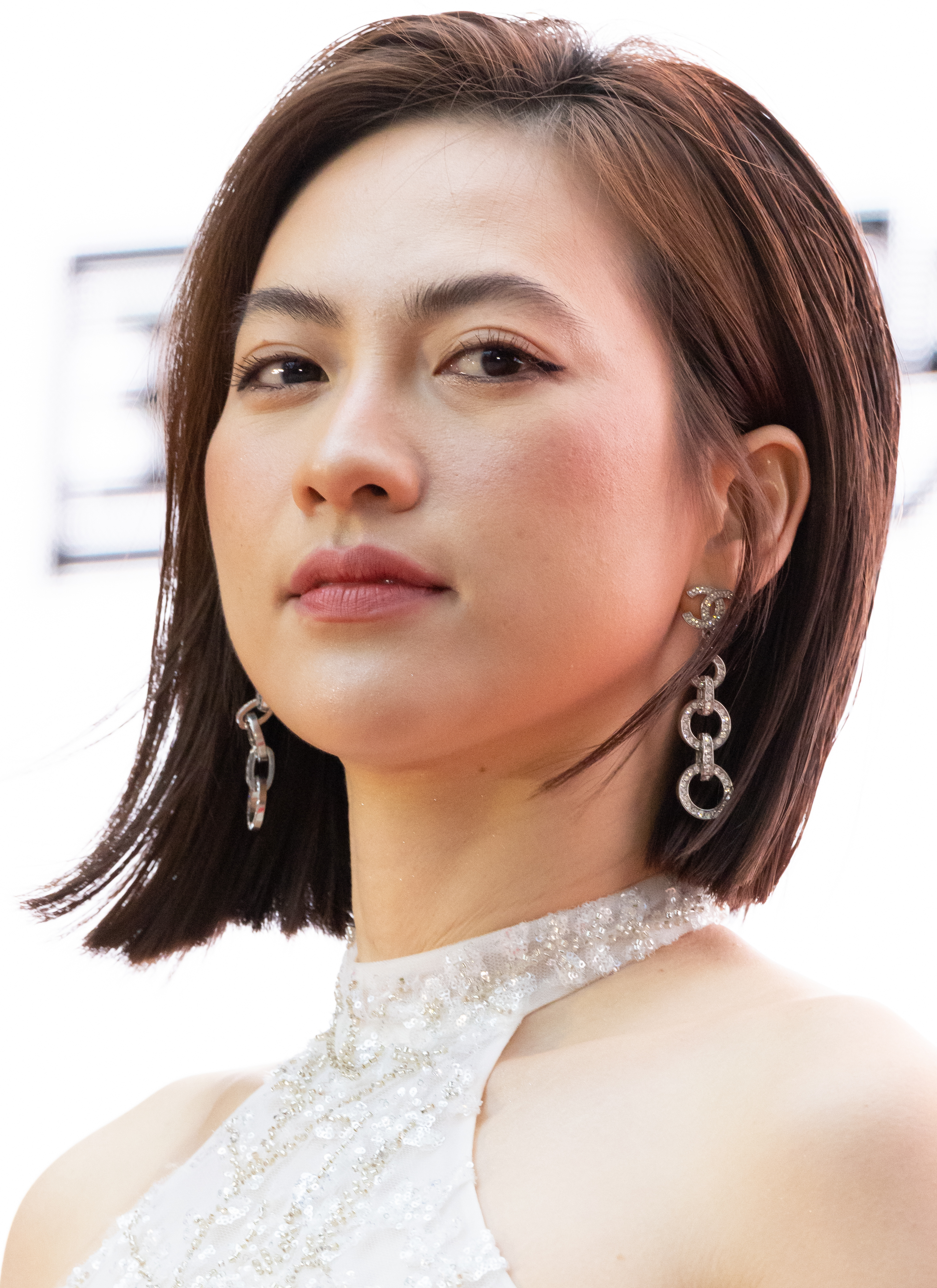
Phương Anh Đào

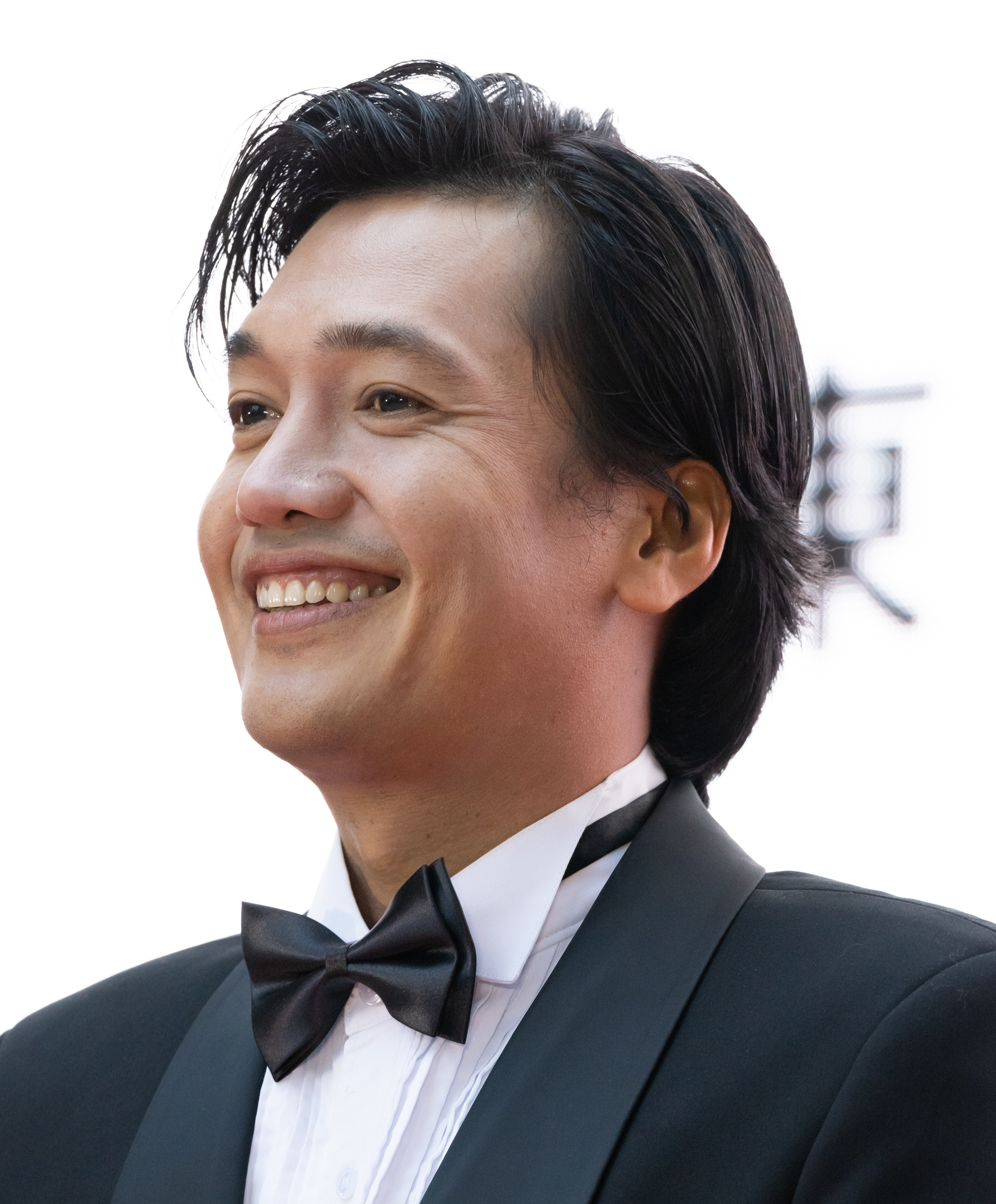
Ngô Quang Tuấn

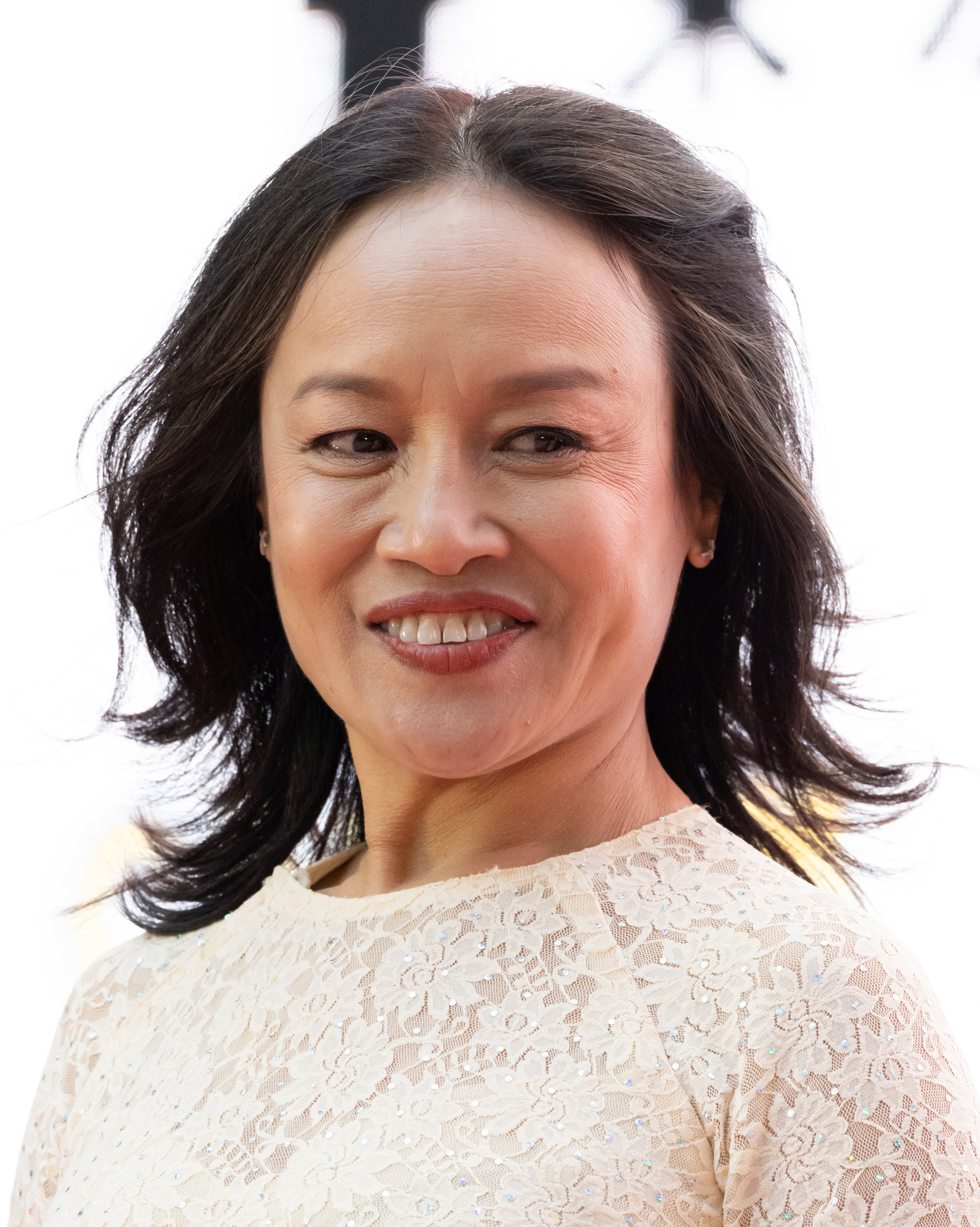
Tú Oanh

== See also ==
- List of submissions to the 96th Academy Awards for Best International Feature Film
- List of Vietnamese submissions for the Academy Award for Best International Feature Film
