= Tăng Thanh Hà =

Vietnamese actress and model (born 1986)

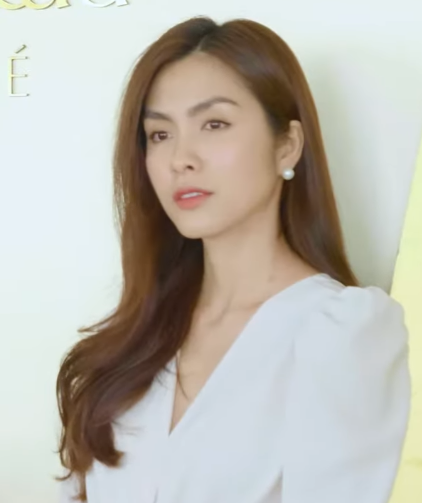
- Hà in 2020
- Born: October 24, 1986 (age 40); Ho Chi Minh City, Vietnam
- Occupations: actress, model
- Years active: 2002–
- Height: 5 ft 5 in (1.65 m)
- Spouse: Louis Nguyen
- Awards: HTV Awards

Tăng Thanh Hà (born Tăng Thị Thanh Hà; October 24, 1986) is a Vietnamese actress and model. She is Toshiba's brand ambassador to Vietnam.

== Early life ==
She was born on 24th October 1986, in Ho Chi Minh City, in a family of Chinese descent. Her mother is from Gò Công, Tiền Giang. When her family business did not go well, she helped her mother out making ends meet: At the age of 11, Tang woke early to assist with preparing food for later distribution to customers. At this time her mother enrolled her in night acting classes at Idecaf.

== Career ==
When she was 16, director Lưu Trọng Ninh asked her to portray Trang in the movie Dốc tình. Although only a minor role, Thanh Ha caught the attention of the film world. She went on to play Mộng Cầm in Hàn Mặc Tử - a film about the celebrated Vietnamese poet -, and won critical acclaim. She was also cast in Hương phù sa in the role of Út Nhỏ and in several ads. She won the Best lead actress award from the Ho Chi Minh City Television in 2006. At this point, however, she left acting to study hotel administration in Singapore just as she became recognized as an up-and-coming actress on television and on the big screen. Upon returning to Vietnam the next year, she was given the leading role in the multi-episode television drama Bỗng dưng muốn khóc. In 2008, she landed a role in Đẹp từng centimét. At the end of 2009 she was selected by director Nguyễn Phan Quang Bình to be in Cánh đồng bất tận (The Floating Lives) based on a novel of the same name by female writer Nguyễn Ngọc Tư.

== Awards ==
- Best lead actress of 2006 according to Ho Chi Minh City Television - the HTV Awards
- Best dressed actress of 2008 according to Mốt magazine VN
- Best-liked TV actress during 2008-2009 (as Trúc in the movie Bỗng Dưng Muốn Khóc)

== Personal life ==
She married Louis Nguyễn, a Vietnamese-Filipino entrepreneur, in November 2012 after three-and-a-half years of dating.

== Filmography ==
=== Television ===
Actor
Title	Year	Role	Notes
Dốc tình	2004	Trang	
Hàn Mặc Tử	2004	Mộng Huyền (AKA Mộng Cầm)	second-lead
Hương phù sa	2005	Út nhỏ	lead
Bỗng dưng muốn khóc	2008	Trúc	second-lead
Ngôi nhà hạnh phúc (Vietnamese version)	2009	guest star	

=== Movies ===
- Đẹp từng centimét: 2009
- The Floating Lives (Cánh đồng bất tận): 2010
- The Lady Assassin (Mỹ Nhân Kế): 2013

=== Plays ===
- Người phố Hoa
