= The Cord of Life =

The Cord of Life may refer to the following films:

- The Cord of Life (1909 film), an American silent short drama directed by D. W. Griffith
- The Cord of Life (2022 film), 2022 Chinese Mongolian-language drama directed by Sixue Qiao
