= Ninh Dương Lan Ngọc =

Vietnamese actress (born 1990)

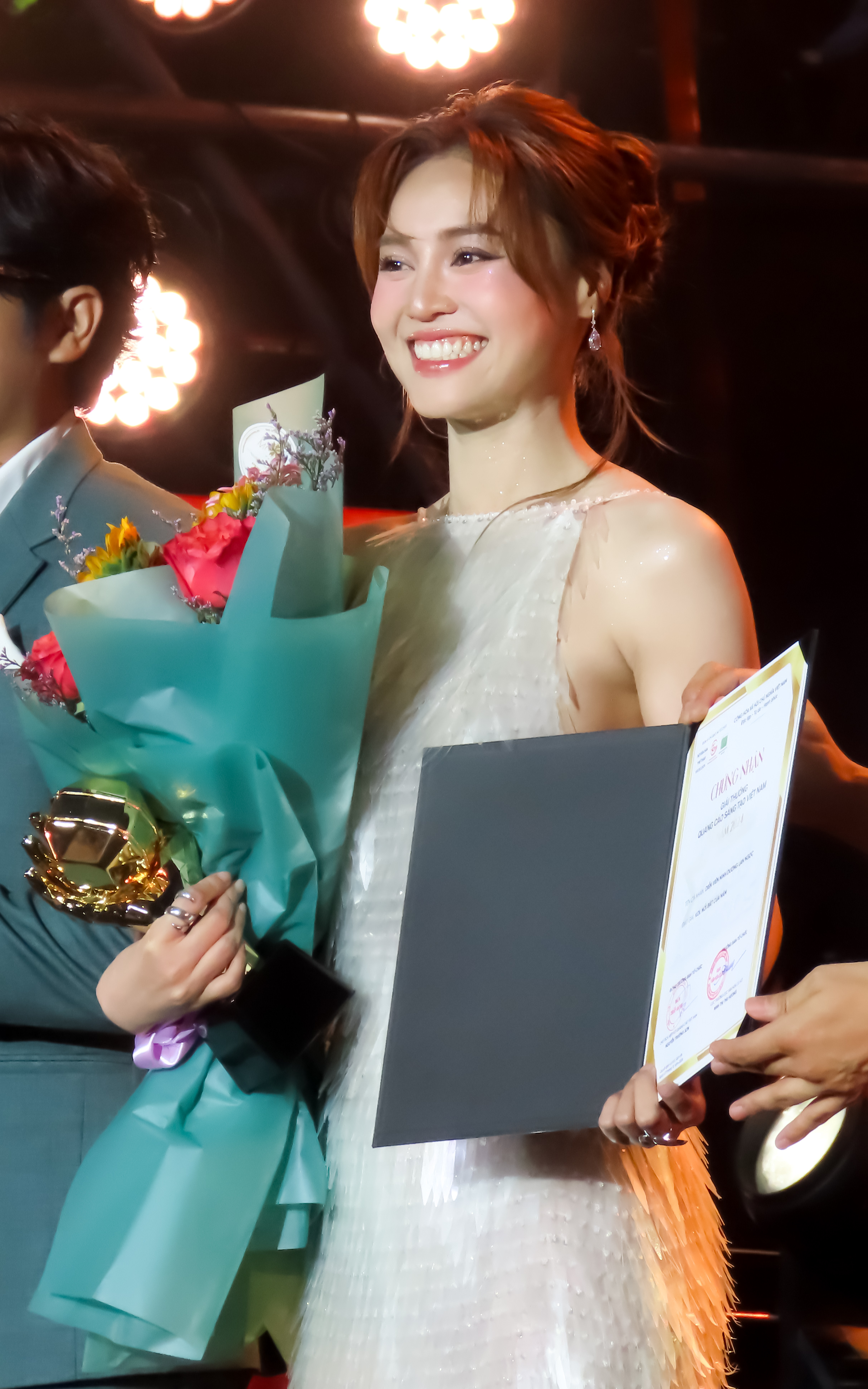
- Ngọc in 2024
- Born: April 4, 1990 (age 36); Ho Chi Minh City, Vietnam
- Occupation: Actress
- Years active: 2009–present

Ninh Dương Lan Ngọc (born April 4, 1990), also known mononymously as Lan Ngọc, is a Vietnamese actress. Considered as one of the best Vietnamese actresses in the generation, she gained popularity with her lead role in The Floating Lives, for which she won the Best Leading Actress award at the 2010 Kite Awards.

== Early life ==
Lan Ngọc was born on April 4, 1990, in Ho Chi Minh City, Vietnam. She graduated from the Ho Chi Minh City College of Stage Performance and Cinematics.

== Career ==
Since 2009, Lan Ngọc started taking a few small roles in music videos and advertising video. In 2010, she played Nương in The Floating Lives. This role helped her win the Best Leading Actress award at the 2010 Golden Kite Awards and the Audience Choice Award for Favourite Actress in a Foreign Film in the 20th Golden Rooster Awards. In 2011, Lan Ngọc released a V-pop music video she recorded with actor and model Hồ Vĩnh Khoa.

In the following years, Lan Ngọc continued to act in hit films such as The Tailor, Tam Cam: The Untold Story, and The Royal Bride. In 2016, she won her second Best Leading Actress award at the Kite Awards for her role in Jackpot. Besides acting, she also participates in many other entertainment activities. In 2015, she became the winner of the sixth season of Bước nhảy hoàn vũ, the Vietnamese version of Dancing with the Stars. In 2023, she competed in the VTV3's reality singing show Chị đẹp đạp gió rẽ sóng, the Vietnamese version of Sisters Who Make Waves, and successfully earned a place in the final seven-member lineup. On April 4, 2024, she became a member of the girl group LUNAS.. In 2026, she competed in the HTV7's reality show Xin chào thứ bảy, the Vietnamese version of Hello Saturday.

== Filmography ==
=== Films ===
Year	Title	Role	Notes
2010	The Floating Lives	Nương	
2011	Long Ruồi	Xuân	
2013	Tèo em	Minh Minh	
2014	Chào cô Thúy	Thuý	
2014	Xui mà hên	Hà	
2015	Jackpot (2015 film)	Thơm	
2016	Tấm Cám: Chuyện chưa kể	Cám	
2016	Phim trường ma	Linh Đan	
2016	Găng tay đỏ	No.7/Băng Tâm	
2016	Nắng	Phương	
2017	The Tailor (film)	Như Ý	
2018	Gái già lắm chiêu 2	Ms. Q	
2019	Cua lại vợ bầu	Nhã Linh	
2020	Gái già lắm chiêu 3	Ms. Q	
2021	Gái già lắm chiêu V	Khách mua hàng	Cameo
2022	1990	Linh Lan	
2022	Cô gái từ quá khứ	Hoàng Quyên	

=== Television ===
Year	Title	Role	Channel
2009	Gia đình phép thuật	Phương	HTV7
2010	Mệnh lệnh Hoa hồng	Bích Thủy	HTV7
2012	Phiên chợ số	Thảo	HTV9
2014	Vừa đi vừa khóc	Lụa	VTV3
2014	Sóng gió hôn nhân	Ánh Giao	HTV9
2016	Nhân tình lạc lối	Mai	VTV6
2016	Nguyệt thực	Mỹ Khanh	VTV3
2019	Mối tình đầu của tôi	An Chi	VTV3
2023	Tứ Đại Mỹ Nhân	Ms.Q	Galaxy Play
