= Bonikka =

- Sinhala: බෝනික්කා
- Directed by: Louie Vanderstraeten
- Written by: Luvi Vanderstraaten
- Produced by: Sannama Trading
- Starring: Malinda Perera; Sanju Samarasinghe; Gayesha Perera
- Cinematography: Tishan Perera
- Edited by: Ruwan Chamara Ranasinghe
- Music by: Asoka Peiris
- Release date: 16 January 2015
- Country: Sri Lanka
- Language: Sinhala

Bonikka (Sinhala: බෝනික්කා) is a 2015 Sri Lankan Sinhala drama romance film directed by Louie Vanderstraeten and produced by Janaka Liyanage for Sannama Trading. It stars Malinda Perera and Sanju Samarasinghe in lead roles along with Gayesha Perera and Wilson Karunaratne. Music composed by Sarath Wickrama. It is the 1219th Sri Lankan film in the Sinhala cinema.

== Cast ==
- Malinda Perera
- Sanju Samarasinghe
- Wilson Karunaratne
- Gayesha Perera as Mareena
- Shalika Edirisinghe
- Anoja Weerasinghe
- Rashmi Pushpika Sumanasekara
- Sarath Dikkumbura
- Kapila Sigera
- Sisira Kumaratunga
