= The Lambs (film) =

1996 film

- Directed by: Marcel Schüpbach
- Written by: Marcel Schüpbach
- Produced by: Jean-Marc Henchoz; Jacques Perrin
- Starring: Richard Berry
- Release date: 1996
- Running time: 90 minutes
- Country: Switzerland
- Language: French

The Lambs (French: Les Agneaux) is a 1996 Swiss drama film directed by Marcel Schüpbach. The film was selected as the Swiss entry for the Best Foreign Language Film at the 69th Academy Awards, but was not accepted as a nominee.

== Cast ==
- Richard Berry as Le père
- Brigitte Roüan as La mère
- Julia Maraval as Marie
- Alexis Tomassian as Daniel
- Noémie Kocher as Nadia

== See also ==
- List of submissions to the 69th Academy Awards for Best Foreign Language Film
- List of Swiss submissions for the Academy Award for Best Foreign Language Film
