= List of submissions to the 69th Academy Awards for Best Foreign Language Film =

1996 Best Foreign Language Film submissions
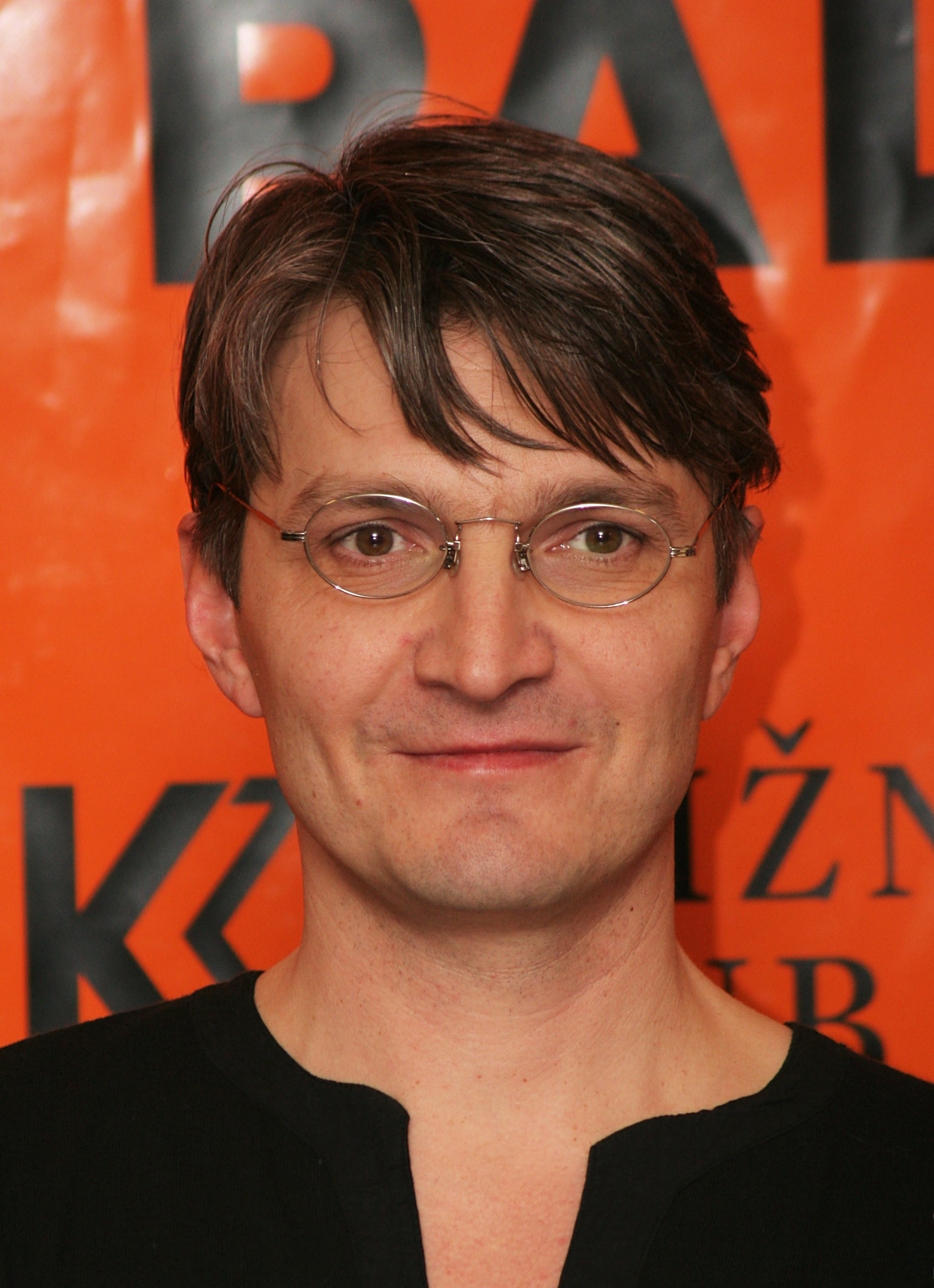
- Jan Svěrák directed Kolya, which won the year's award.

Highlights
- Oscar winner: (Czech Republic) Kolya
- Submissions: 39
- Debuts: 3
- Total eligible: 38

This is a list of submissions to the 69th Academy Awards for the Best Foreign Language Film. The Academy of Motion Picture Arts and Sciences (AMPAS) has invited the film industries of various countries to submit their best film for the Academy Award for Best Foreign Language Film every year since the award was created in 1956. The award is presented annually by the Academy to a feature-length motion picture produced outside the United States that contains primarily non-English dialogue. The Foreign Language Film Award Committee oversees the process and reviews all the submitted films.

For the 69th Academy Awards, the submitted motion pictures must have first been released theatrically in their respective countries between 1 November 1995 and 31 October 1996. The deadline for submissions to the Academy was 1 November 1996. 39 countries submitted films, and 38 were found to be eligible by AMPAS and screened for voters. Albania, Australia and Georgia submitted films for the first time. The five nominees were announced on 11 February 1997.

The Czech Republic won the award for the first time, marking the first win since its dissolution, with Kolya by Jan Svěrák.

== Submissions ==
Submitting country	Film title used in nomination	Original title	Language(s)	Director(s)	Result
Albania	Colonel Bunker	Kolonel Bunker	Albanian, English	Kujtim Çashku	Not nominated
Algeria	Hi Cousin!	Salut cousin!	French, Arabic	Merzak Allouache	Not nominated
Argentina	Eva Peron	Eva Perón	Spanish	Juan Carlos Desanzo	Not nominated
Australia	Floating Life	浮生	Cantonese, English, German	Clara Law	Not nominated
Austria	Hannah		German	Reinhard Schwabenitzky	Not nominated
Belarus	From Hell to Hell	Из ада в ад / З пекла ў пекла	German, Russian, Yiddish	Dmitriy Astrakhan	Not nominated
Belgium	The Eighth Day	Le huitième jour	French	Jaco Van Dormael	Not nominated
Brazil	Tieta of Agreste	Tieta do Agreste	Brazilian Portuguese	Carlos Diegues	Not nominated
Canada	Not Me!	Sous-sol	French	Pierre Gang	Not nominated
Colombia	Oedipus Mayor	Edipo alcalde	Spanish	Jorge Alí Triana	Not nominated
Croatia	Nausikaya	Nausikaja	Croatian, Dalmatian Croatian	Vicko Ruić	Not nominated
Cuba	Think of Me	Pon tu pensamiento en mí	Spanish	Arturo Sotto Díaz	Not nominated
Czech Republic	Kolya	Kolja	Czech, Slovak, Russian	Jan Svěrák	Won Academy Award
Denmark	Hamsun		Danish, Swedish, German, Norwegian, English	Jan Troell	Not nominated
Finland	Drifting Clouds	Kauas pilvet karkaavat	Finnish, Finland Swedish, English	Aki Kaurismäki	Withdrawn
France	Ridicule		French, French Sign Language	Patrice Leconte	Nominated
Georgia	A Chef in Love	შეყვარებული კულინარის 1001 რეცეპტი	French, Georgian, Russian	Nana Jorjadze	Nominated
Germany	Deathmaker	Der Totmacher	German	Romuald Karmakar	Not nominated
Hong Kong	Hu-Du-Men	虎度門	Cantonese	Shu Kei	Not nominated
Hungary	Vaska Easoff	Haggyállógva, Vászka	Russian, Hungarian	Péter Gothár	Not nominated
Iceland	Devil's Island	Djöflaeyjan	Icelandic	Friðrik Þór Friðriksson	Not nominated
India	Indian	இந்தியன்	Tamil	S. Shankar	Not nominated
Israel	Saint Clara	קלרה הקדושה	Hebrew, Russian, French, English	Ari Folman and Ori Sivan	Not nominated
Italy	My Generation	La mia generazione	Italian	Wilma Labate	Not nominated
Japan	A Class to Remember II	学校II	Japanese	Yoji Yamada	Not nominated
Mexico	Between Pancho Villa and a Naked Woman	Entre Pancho Villa y una mujer desnuda	Spanish	Sabina Berman and Isabelle Tardans	Not nominated
Netherlands	Long Live the Queen	Lang leve de koningin	Dutch	Esmé Lammers	Not nominated
Norway	The Other Side of Sunday	Søndagsengler	Norwegian	Berit Nesheim	Nominated
Philippines	Dead Sure	Segurista	Filipino	Tikoy Aguiluz	Not nominated
Poland	At Full Gallop	Cwał	Polish, Russian, French, Italian, English	Krzysztof Zanussi	Not nominated
Romania	State of Things	Stare de fapt	Romanian	Stere Gulea	Not nominated
Russia	Prisoner of the Mountains	Кавказский пленник	Russian, Georgian, Azerbaijani, Avar, Chechen, Turkish	Sergei Bodrov	Nominated
Slovenia	Felix	Feliks	Slovene, French, Italian, Hungarian, German	Božo Šprajc	Not nominated
Spain	Bwana		Spanish, English, German, Bube	Imanol Uribe	Not nominated
Sweden	Jerusalem		Swedish, English	Bille August	Not nominated
Switzerland	The Lambs	Les agneaux	French	Marcel Schüpbach	Not nominated
Taiwan	Tonight Nobody Goes Home	今天不回家	Mandarin, Cantonese	Sylvia Chang	Not nominated
Vietnam	Gone, Gone Forever Gone	Bụi hồng	Vietnamese	Hồ Quang Minh	Not nominated
FR Yugoslavia	Pretty Village, Pretty Flame	Лепа села лепо горе	Bosnian, Serbian, English, German	Srđan Dragojević	Not nominated

== Notes ==
- Finland submitted Drifting Clouds by Aki Kaurismäki, but it was ejected before the formal review process because Kaurismäki withdrew the film from consideration.
