= Peacock Lament =

2022 Sri Lankan Sinhala-language film

- Directed by: Sanjeewa Pushpakumara
- Produced by: Sanjeewa Pushpakumara; Amil Abeysundara; Suranga Handapangoda; Yuganthi Yashodara; Wathuhena Sangeetha; Nilnadee Godagama; Andrea Magnani; Chiara Barbo
- Starring: Akalanka Prabashwara; Sabeetha Perera; Dinara Punchihewa; Mahendra Perera
- Cinematography: Sisikirana Paranavithana
- Edited by: Giuseppe Leonetti
- Production companies: Sapushpa Expression; Pilgrim Film
- Release date: October 2022
- Running time: 103 minutes
- Countries: Sri Lanka; Italy
- Languages: Sinhalese; English

Peacock Lament (Sinhalese title: Vihanga Premaya, Sinhala: විහඟ ප්‍රේමය) is a 2022 Sri Lankan Sinhala language drama film written and directed by Sanjeewa Pushpakumara. The film was co-produced by Chiara Barbo of Pilgrim Film and Sanjeewa himself for Sapushpa Expressions. The film had its world premiere at the 35th Tokyo International Film Festival in 2022.

== Synopsis ==
Amila (Akalanka Prabashwara), a 19-year-old boy who was born and grew up in a small village in the Eastern Province of Sri Lanka, makes a committed decision to move on with his life following a series of traumatic incidents that unfolded in his life, including the loss of his parents at such a young age and being left behind as a helpless orphan. He then relocated to a more urban typical Colombo, a city that was way more advanced in terms of skyscrapers, robust infrastructure facilities, and other prominent landmarks than the area where he was born. He made the decision to move to Colombo in pursuit of better opportunities to enhance his living standards and to ensure a redemption arc in his life after gaining all the life experiences from the leaps and bounds, chaotic circumstances he confronted in his formative years. He also had to make such a move to look after and take care of his four young siblings, and one of his sisters, Inoka, was suffering from a congenital heart defect called Tetralogy of Fallot. The doctor advised Amila to immediately make arrangements for an urgent surgery, which had to be proceeded within a duration of two months in India.

Amila guarantees to obtain the funding requirement amounting to $15,000 for the surgery, but his job as a construction worker at a Chinese building construction site does not give him the luxury to demand sufficient pay, which could have otherwise allowed him the bare minimum to cover the medical surgery expenses. Meanwhile, his siblings had opted to collect money by begging in the streets without Amila's knowledge. The situation is further worsened as the days pass by, but much to the relief of Amila, he finds a glimmer of hope when he meets Malini (Sabitha Perera), a 55-year-old woman who decides to assist him out by hiring to work in her child trafficking business. The job could not be sacrificed, although it was in contravention of ethical moral considerations, but with the gravity of the situation, Amila takes the opportunity as a hobson's choice for him to raise finance for the medical surgery expenses of his sister. Amila then makes strides in terms of generating money with the illegal transport of the women, but he ultimately realizes the consequences and repercussions that could be caused due to his actions. He then feels empathy for all the affected women and he strikes a friendship with one of the women, Nadee (Dinara Punchihewa) to help all the women escape from the danger.

== Cast ==
- Akalanka Prabashwara as Amila
- Sabeetha Perera as Malini
- Dinara Punchihewa as Nadee
- Mahendra Perera
- Lorenzo Acquaviva
- Amiththa Weerasinghe

== Premiere ==
In November 2023, the film was screened at the 54th Goa International Goa Film Festival. The film also competed in the main competition of the 35th Tokyo International Film Festival and the film had two press, industry screenings and three public screenings.

== Accolades ==
It was also officially selected as one of the 24 film projects of the fourth edition of European Work in Progress Cologne (EWIP) in Germany. The film won the Best Artistic Contribution at the 35th Tokyo International Film Festival in 2022.
