= Jackpot (2015 film) =

2015 film

- Film poster
- Directed by: Dustin Nguyen
- Written by: Manh Tuan Nguyen
- Starring: Ninh Duong Lan Ngoc
- Release date: 13 February 2015
- Country: Vietnam
- Language: Vietnamese

Jackpot (Vietnamese: Trúng số) is a 2015 Vietnamese comedy film directed by Dustin Nguyen. The film won the Golden Kite Prize and was selected as the Vietnamese entry for the Best Foreign Language Film at the 88th Academy Awards, but it was unnominated.

== Cast ==
- Ninh Dương Lan Ngọc as Thom
- Dustin Nguyen as Tu Nghia
- Chi Tai as Tu Phi

== See also ==
- List of submissions to the 88th Academy Awards for Best Foreign Language Film
- List of Vietnamese submissions for the Academy Award for Best Foreign Language Film
