= 23rd Vietnam Film Festival =

2023 film award

- Location: Đà Lạt, Lâm Đồng, Vietnam
- Founded: 1970
- No. of films: 91 (In Competition): 16 feature films; 31 documentaries; 19 science films; 25 animated films
- Festival date: November 21–25, 2023
- Website: lienhoanphimvietnam.com

Vietnam Film Festival
- 24th 22nd

The 23rd Vietnam Film Festival was held from November 21 to 25, 2023, in Da Lat City, Lâm Đồng province, Vietnam, with the slogan "Building a Vietnamese film industry rich in national identity, modern and humane" (Vietnamese: "Xây dựng nền công nghiệp điện ảnh Việt Nam giàu bản sắc dân tộc, hiện đại và nhân văn").

== Juries ==
=== Feature film ===
- Đào Bá Sơn, People's Artist, Vietnamese film director – Jury President
- Trần Quốc Dũng, People's Artist, Vietnamese cinematographer
- Phạm Nhuệ Giang, People's Artist, Vietnamese film director
- Phạm Thị Phong Điệp, Vietnamese writer and journalist
- Trần Mạnh Hùng, Vietnamese musician
- Trịnh Đình Lê Minh, Vietnamese film director
- Trần Quang Minh, PhD, Vietnamese artist
- Nguyễn Như Quỳnh, People's Artist, Vietnamese actress
- Nguyễn Chánh Trực (Charlie Nguyễn), Vietnamese–American screenwriter and producer

=== Documentary/Science film ===
- Nguyễn Lương Đức, People's Artist, Vietnamese film director – Jury President
- Trần Tuấn Hiệp, Vietnamese film director
- Đặng Thái Huyền, Colonel, Vietnamese film director
- Ngô Ngọc Ngũ Long, Vietnamese journalist and art critic
- Phạm Huy Quang, PhD, Vietnamese cinematographer
- Đinh Trọng Tuấn, Vietnamese journalist
- Tạ Quỳnh Tư, Vietnamese film director

=== Animated film ===
- Đỗ Lệnh Hùng Tú, Associate professor, PhD, Vietnamese artist – Jury President
- Lý Thu Hà, Merited Artist, Vietnamese artist and film director
- Phạm Sông Đông, Vietnamese screenwriter
- Nguyễn Ngọc Tuấn, Master, Vietnamese artist
- Phạm Quang Vinh, Vietnamese artist

== Awards ==
=== Feature film ===
The following awards were presented for feature films:

- Lotus Prize:
  - Golden Lotus: Glorious Ashes by Bùi Thạc Chuyên
  - Silver Lotus: Angels by Lưu Huỳnh, You and Trinh by Phan Gia Nhật Linh and Peach, Pho and Piano by Phi Tiến Sơn
  - Jury's Merit: Nhot Finding Her Husband by Vũ Ngọc Đãng
- "Cao nguyên hùng vĩ" Prize: You and Trinh by Phan Gia Nhật Linh
- Best Popular Film: Hustler vs Scammer by Võ Thanh Hoà
- Best Actor: Thái Hoà for Nhot Finding Her Husband
- Best Actress: Mai Cát Vi and Đinh Y Nhung for Angels
- Best Supporting Actor: Lê Công Hoàng for Glorious Ashes
- Best Supporting Actress: Bùi Lan Hương for You and Trinh
- Best Director: Bùi Thạc Chuyên for Glorious Ashes
- Best Screenplay: Lưu Huỳnh for Angels
- Best Visual Effects: Visual Effects Crew for Girl from the Past
- Best First Film Director: Andy Nguyễn for Fanti
- Best Cinematography: Nguyễn K'linh for Glorious Ashes and Nguyễn Phan Linh Đan for Girl from the Past
- Best Art Design: Ghia Ci Fam for The Last Wife
- Best Original Score: Tôn Thất An for Glorious Ashes
- Best Sound Design: Vick Võ Hoàng for You and Trinh

=== Documentary ===
The following awards were presented for documentaries:

- Lotus Prize:
  - Golden Lotus: Children of the Mist by Hà Lệ Diễm
  - Silver Lotus: Hanoi Sky Remains Evergreen – Episode 2: The Sky of Peace by Bùi Thanh Hải and Two Hands by Đặng Thị Linh
  - Jury's Merit: The Road to Peace by Đoàn Hồng Lê and Dear, Don't Weep at the End of the Road by Nguyễn Đức Đệ
- Best Director: Hà Lệ Diễm for Children of the Mist
- Best Screenplay: Đặng Thị Linh for Two Hands
- Best Cinematography: Nguyễn Thiên Định for Hungry Seas
- Best Sound Design: Chu Đức Thắng, Đào Thị Hằng for Steel in the Deep Sea

=== Science film ===
The following awards were presented for science films:

- Lotus Prize:
  - Golden Lotus: Research on Technology Applications in Firefighting by Hà Xuân Trường
  - Silver Lotus: Submerged Waste by Vũ Hoài Nam
  - Jury's Merit: Polluted Land by Nguyễn Thu and Deciphering the Traces of the Fire Incident by Nam Chung, Hà Hương, Lê Nhung
- Best Director: Nguyễn Thu for Polluted Land
- Best Screenplay: Trịnh Quang Bách for Black Hole
- Best Cinematography: Vũ Trọng Quảng, Nguyễn Ngọc Sơn, Nguyễn Bảo Khánh for Survival
- Best Sound Design: Dương Ngọc Hoà for Lithophone – Ancient Treasure

=== Animated film ===
The following awards were presented for animated films:

- Lotus Prize:
  - Golden Lotus: A Child's Dream by Phạm Hồng Sơn
  - Silver Lotus: Smile by Nguyễn Quang Trung and Bà của Đỗ Đỏ by Nguyễn Thị Hồng Linh
  - Jury's Merit: The Paradise Guava Tree by Phạm Ngọc Tuấn and Me Linh Female General by Phùng Văn Hà
- Best Director: Nguyễn Quang Trung for Smile
- Best Screenplay: Nguyễn Quang Thiều for The Paradise Guava Tree
- Best Acting Animator: Acting Animator Crew for Emperor Le Dai Hanh
- Best Shaping Animator: Bùi Mạnh Quang for The Legend of Da Trach Marsh
- Best Original Score: Lương Ngọc Châu for Fog
- Best Sound Design: Nguyễn Duy Long for Emperor Le Dai Hanh
