= The Tailor (film) =

2017 film by Trần Bửu Lộc and Nguyễn Lê Phương Khanh

- Theatrical poster
- Directed by: Trần Bửu Lộc; Nguyễn Lê Phương Khanh
- Screenplay by: Nguyễn Lê Phương Khanh; A Type Machine
- Produced by: Ngô Thanh Vân; Thủy Nguyễn
- Starring: Ngô Thanh Vân; Lan Ngọc; Diễm My; Hồng Vân; Vũ Phạm Diễm My
- Cinematography: Hà Thúc Phù Nam
- Edited by: Ngô Quyền
- Music by: Nguyễn Hoàng Anh
- Production companies: Vietnam Artist Agency; Studio' 68; Thuy Design House; K+ Kantana Vietnam
- Distributed by: BHD
- Release date: 14 October 2017
- Running time: 100 minutes
- Country: Vietnam
- Language: Vietnamese

The Tailor (Vietnamese: Cô Ba Sài Gòn) is a 2017 Vietnamese 35mm drama film directed by Trần Bửu Lộc and Nguyễn Lê Phương Khanh. It is loosely based on a script by A Type Machine, and starrs Ninh Dương Lan Ngọc, Hong Van, Diem My, Ngo Thanh Van, Diem My 9x, S.T (365 The Band), Oanh Kieu, Tung Leo, Kaylee, Hai Trieu, Thanh Tu and Thuy Vy. The theme of the movie is to embrace the beauty of Ao Dai, a traditional costume of Viet Nam

The movie was internationally released at 22nd Busan International Film Festival on October 14, 2017 in Korea, before the official release in Vietnam on November 10, 2017. After 1 month, the movie earned more than 60 billion VND in theatrical revenues. At 20th Vietnam Film Festival, The Tailor won two awards, including an award from the judge. It was selected as the Vietnamese entry for the Best Foreign Language Film at the 91st Academy Awards, but it was not nominated.

== Plot ==
The re-enactment of a áo dài era in the 1960s is thought to be the heyday of traditional Vietnamese costumes. Interwoven into that transformation in the style and style of the áo dài in modern times are told through the story of Miss Ba. Audiences will also see somewhere the image of the 1960s–70s full of honest women. An image of Saigon in the past, gentle and steeped in contrast to the rush of a dynamic city will be described by fashion, namely áo dài. All of them are cleverly nested in the story between two families, between mothers and their children, between a tailor and a fabric shop filled with dramatic rage.

=== Main plot ===
In 1969, the tailor house Thanh Nu is considered to be the most famous tailor house in Saigon. Nine generations of the family have spent their entire life tailoring ao dai. The owner who is Thanh Mai has two daughters: Nhu Y who is her biological daughter and Thanh Loan who was adopted. Thanh Loan enjoys tailoring ao dai while Nhu Y prefers designing Westernized outfits, since she claims ao dai is old-fashioned and doesn't have variety of designs. Thanh Mai advises Nhu Y to focus on learning how to make ao dai but she neglects, because she only likes Western style. One day, Thanh Mai uses a unique piece of fabric passed down from her ancestor, to make a beautiful ao dai. Nhu Y sees it (due to her name is embroidered on that ao dai) and decides to try it on. Strange thing happens as soon as she tries it, the piece of jade sends her to the year of 2017.

Nhu Y falls on An Khanh (as Nhu Y in 2017) as she is about to attempt suicide, causing the piece of jade to detach from the ao dai. Nhu Y is shocked to know that the tailor house Thanh Nu has been closed and barely believes that An Khanh is her in the future, and how Saigon has become greatly modernized. Her house is empty and quiet. It's revealed that after Thanh Mai had died, Thanh Loan was told to leave the house by An Khanh so An Khanh could open a Western tailor house, however the business failed shortly afterward. This causes An Khanh to become an alcoholic. Thanh Loan opened her own business mainly focusing on tailoring ao dai, she later has two kids: Helen and Tuan. Helen is a famous fashion designer while Tuan is working at Helen's company.

Helen agrees to help An Khanh keep the house, however Nhu Y must work for her in exchange. Nhu Y works as a cleaner while Tuan helps her adapt to modern life. The company needs some 1960s inspired designs which is An Khanh's specialty so she helps Helen. Being impressed by Nhu Y's talent, Helen assigns her to ao dai designing. This is her big challenge since she has always hated ao dai and doesn't know how to do that. At the same time, she would like to tailor ao dai following Thanh Nu's traditional way, which will help Thanh Nu regain its reputation.

An Khanh meets Thanh Loan in order to apologize and ask Thanh Loan how to tailor ao dai properly. Later, Thanh Loan gives An Khanh an envelope which is the letter from Thanh Mai attaching ao dai tailoring method. An Khanh and Nhu Y together practice on how to make ao dai.

In the fashion event, model Trang Ngo and many models wear Nhu Y's collection on the catwalk. While the show is going on, Helen intends to switch Nhu Y as the designer into her name in the script, however Tuan catches and confronts her to carefully consider about her decision. Finally, the show is a success as Nhu Y expresses her thought on the collection, sends her thank to Helen. Right after that, the tailor house Thanh Nu is reopened.

Nhu Y wears the ao dai with the piece of jade attached, the magical jade sends her back to 1969. She meets her mom again and apologizes her, saying she's knows how to make ao dai. Both of them joyfully dance together.

== Cast ==
=== 1969 characters ===
- Ngô Thanh Vân as Thanh Mai
- Ninh Dương Lan Ngọc as Như Ý
- Oanh Kiều as young Thanh Loan
- Thủy Hương as Madame Kiều Bảo Hân
- Kim Thư as Riceshop woman
- Trác Thúy Miêu as Speaker Lệ Phương
- Hà Trúc as Givenchy
- Thanh Tú as Thuy
- Thúy Vy as Yen

=== 2017 characters ===
- Hồng Vân as An Khánh
- Diễm My as Thanh Loan
- Vũ Phạm Diễm My as Helen
- Nguyễn Cao Sơn Thạch as Tuấn
- Vũ Hà Anh as Trang Ngô
- Nguyễn Thanh Tùng as Hiển
- Hải Triều as Baby Nana
- Hoàng Tú Linh as Ngọc
- Đông Nhi as "Thanh Nu Tailor's 20th Successor"

== Production ==
The movie's location is Saigon in 2017.

The foundation for the movie was from a conversation between Ngo Thanh Van and fashion designer Thuy Nguyen, as both wanted to make movie about Vietnamese women. Especially, Ngo Thanh Van owns an admiration toward ao dai in general. In Lunar New Year 2017, there were many discussions leading Ngo Thanh Van come to realize that "the young generation don't know much about ao dai and their interest for ao dai becomes less". Therefore, she and Thuy Nguyen decided to bring "ao dai to big screen" so everyone could recognize "the dreamy beauty of one woman in ao dai". After quite a time working on the script and tons of idea switching, Ngo Thanh Van had to rewrite the whole script sometimes. It wasn't not until reading the complete script from script writer Kay Nguyen, she "was relieved to receive a script in which honors ao dai, also following the previous spirit at the same time"

In order to portray character Nhu Y, actress Ninh Duong Lan Ngoc shared that she'd had to research and practice speaking and behaving like a 1960s girl and also study some French.

The costume was specially designed by fashion designer Thuy Nguyen. She shared that "my idea for ao dai in the movie, especially the familiar tile details was inspired from Saigon itself and my lovely old house", as "a longing for The Pearl of The East in 60s with a fresh and delicate spirit". Beside ao dai, the movie also mentioned popular Western style in the 1960s such as A-line skirt, pencil skirt and straight skirt.

In the explanation for the title (Vietnamese title: Co Ba Sai Gon), Ngo Thanh Van stated that the term "Co Ba" is used to remind the image of Southern women back in the day, not an actual name and confirmed that she'd registered trademark for this name in order not to be confused with other cosmetic or cuisine brand names.

=== Soundtrack ===
The main soundtrack with same title as the movie is presented by Dong Nhi, composed and written by Only C, Nguyễn Phúc Thiện and Lou Hoàng, produced by Only C – which he described as "typical pop song, catchy tune but the lyric has a lot to say", with an encouraging message "which makes everyone fall in love with ao dai even more". "Tan Thoi" is the soundtrack at the end of the movie was presented by Jun Pham, mixed by Huynh Hien Nang in classic and retro style. According to Tuoi Tre, the song tells "a difference" between last decades and the modern world, where "it seems like people are neglecting others' existence, nor no longer using old methods of communication like before".

S.T composed and presented the song "Vi Anh Luon O Day" (Because I'm Always Here). This is a gift from him, written by Lou Hoang and produced by Tuan Mario. Nguoi Lao Dong Newspaper describes the song is "a soft and deep ballad talking about a man's confusion when in love. Hoping for a happy ending; although going through how many obstacles and challenges anyway, he is still willing to protect and stand by her side till the end".

Before the official release, the producer introduced two songs "Co Ba Sai Gon" and "Tan Thoi" in October 20 and November 7, 2017. The complete soundtrack album was exclusively released on nhac.vn on November 29, 2017. Three music videos of three songs "Co Ba Sai Gon", "Tan Thoi" and "Vi Anh Luon O Day" were released on 16, 19 and 22 November 2017.

=== Art ===
- Production management: Lê Văn Định
- First AD: Giang Ho
- Production design: Nguyễn Minh Đương &
- Creative Director: Lê Đức Hiệp
- Editorial department: Ngô Quyền
- Sound: Chawakorn Thongkua
- Make-up: Nguyễn Thị Kim Ngân
- Stylists: Lê Minh Ngọc, Nguyễn Vũ Long
- Visual effects: Kantana Vietnam Co.ltd

== Marketing ==
On October 20, 2017, the crew had a special appearance in the opening night of 2017 Fashion and Technology Festival, the theme was Ban Sac phuong Dong at Nguyễn Huệ Boulevard, they had talk regarding encouraging young generation to be confident in ao dai. To share with Marketing & Family Magazine, the crew said that for one movie to participate in this festival "had never happened before" and this was "a chance for The Tailor to truly confirm all the values they're looking for; their position in fashion world and the audience". Also in that night, singer Dong Nhi did a live performance of "Co Ba Sai Gon" before the release for pop art inspired lyric music video including her and some from the cast.

On November 1, 2017, fashion designer Thuy Nguyen introduced her collection "Co Ba Sai Gon" in the second night of International Vietnam Fashion Week Fall Winter 2017. Ngo Thanh Van was the first face of the show, portraying in 1960 inspired ao dai next to a traditional sewing machine and began "slowly yet mysteriously walking" on the catwalk. November 5, 2017, the crew hold a meet up named "Ao Dai Day" with chosen audiences at BHD Vincom Mega Mall box office in Thao Dien, where the early premiere of the movie and teasers of two music videos were also released. Five days before the release date, a short clip of Thanh Nu tailor house was revealed.

On November 10, 2017, Ninh Duong Lan Ngoc, Diem My 9x, Oanh Kieu and S.T appeared in TV shows from Vietnam Television such as: Chuyen Dong 24 Gio Trua and Bua Trua Vui Ve. The crew also had cinetour at many cinema theaters in Ho Chi Minh City, starting at Lotte Go Vap from November 11, 2017. On November 20, 2017, Co Ba Sai Gon Music Festival was held at The Garden Mall, Ho Chi Minh City included Ninh Duong Lan Ngoc, Diem My 9x, S.T, Dong Nhi, Phuong Vy, Will and Jun Pham. Along with the performances from participated singers and Top 6 from Tieng Hat Co Ba Sai Gon Contest, the show also included Dance Cover Contest for Co Ba Sai Gon's soundtrack.

Some agencies cooperated with Co Ba Sai Gon to produce merchandise solely inspired by the movie. EPOMi, a sponsor of the meet up at 2017 Fashion & Technology Festival, produced beauty box with two versions: Premium and Standard inspired by Classic and Modern styles (or also known as "Co Ba" and "Chi Ba" style). Co Ba Sai Gon Perfume Box included three products such as: Pearl of the East perfume, Lily scented balm and Co Ba Sai Gon soap. Vascara, one of the sponsors, introduced a classic gift included a card, sewing box and the letter from Thanh Mai to Nhu Y. Mono Concept released phone case, USB, luggage tag and water bottle which were decorated with pop art inspired illustration of the cast.

Sai Gon Giai Phong Newspaper stated that the crew has "greatly made a nice branding" from the project announcement to the official release by "skillful PR campaigns", for example "female cast often appeared in traditional ao dai and classic make up style in big events such Busan Film Festival, Golden Kite Award,...and many supplementary events" or how the announcement regarding the postpone of the official release was demonstrated in classic newspaper style.

== Release ==
=== Release at film festivals ===
The Tailor competed in 22nd Busan International Film Festival for Asian Film Window category with three showtimes which restricted children under 12 in October 14, 15 and 17 2017, at Starium of CGV Centum City cinema, number 2 and 7 room of Lotte Centum City cinema. Before the premiere, two directors, Ngo Thanh Van, Ninh Duong Lan Ngoc, Diem My 9x and Oanh Kieu had a meet up with the guests of Film Festival at BIFF Village stage by the beach of Haeundae. According to the producer, the first showtime was sold out with 1,000 tickets and received many positive reviews from critics and the audience as they complimented "such a nice and meaningful movie reserving the culture".

At the end of November 2017, The Tailor participated and competed in 20th Vietnam Film Festival in Da Nang. After the premiere of 20th Vietnam Film Festival Welcoming Week at National Cinema Center on November 11 at Hanoi, the movie was released afterward at Le Do Cinema, on November 27, 2017 at Da Nang. According to Tien Phong Newspaper, the showtime belonged to Film Festival was completely crowded, the audience streamed down to the cinema before showtime was so many that two line of supplementary seats were placed inside, and no one left during the movie. The Tailor continued to participate in Vietnam-Korea Film Festival with two showtimes on November 19 and 20 2017 at BHD Bitexco Cinema, Ho Chi Minh City. At 13th Osaka Asian Film Festival, the movie competed and had two showtimes at room number 4 of Cine Libre Umeda Cinema and ABC Hall, on March 11 and 15 2018. The movie also joined in Vietnam Film Week by Vietnam Consulate at Argentina in cooperation with Argentina representative office, in May 2018 at Buenos Aires Capital as 45 year anniversary of foreign communication between Vietnam and Argentina.

=== Release at the cinema ===
The Tailor was official released at all the cinemas in Vietnam from November 10, 2017 and early showtime from November 9, 2017, which was the only Vietnam film release during that time, among 16 foreign movies. According to Tuoi Tre, VAA Agency had agreed on the 50% revenue rate agreement with CGV Vietnam to have The Tailor released at CGV after the incident of Tam Cam: Chuyen chua ke in August 2016 previously.

The early premiere for artists and the press was operated at BHD Vincome Mega Mall Thao Dien, on November 8, 2017 in Ho Chi Minh City and on November 9, 2017 at Ha Noi.

== Reception ==
Many film makers stated that The Tailor didn't only "stick to old nostalgia" but also "insert the story between the past and the present via fashion – directly targeting at the audience's curiosity"

== Accolades ==
- Best Production Design at 20th Vietnam Film Festival for Nguyen Minh Duong & Le Duc Hiep
- Judges' Choice at 20th Vietnam Film Festival
- Best Creative Work at Blue Star Awards 2018 for Creative Team: Thuy Nguyen, Nguyen Minh Duong & Le Duc Hiep
- Best Film at Golden Kite Awards 2018

== See also ==
- List of submissions to the 91st Academy Awards for Best Foreign Language Film
- List of Vietnamese submissions for the Academy Award for Best Foreign Language Film
