= Flying Fish (film) =

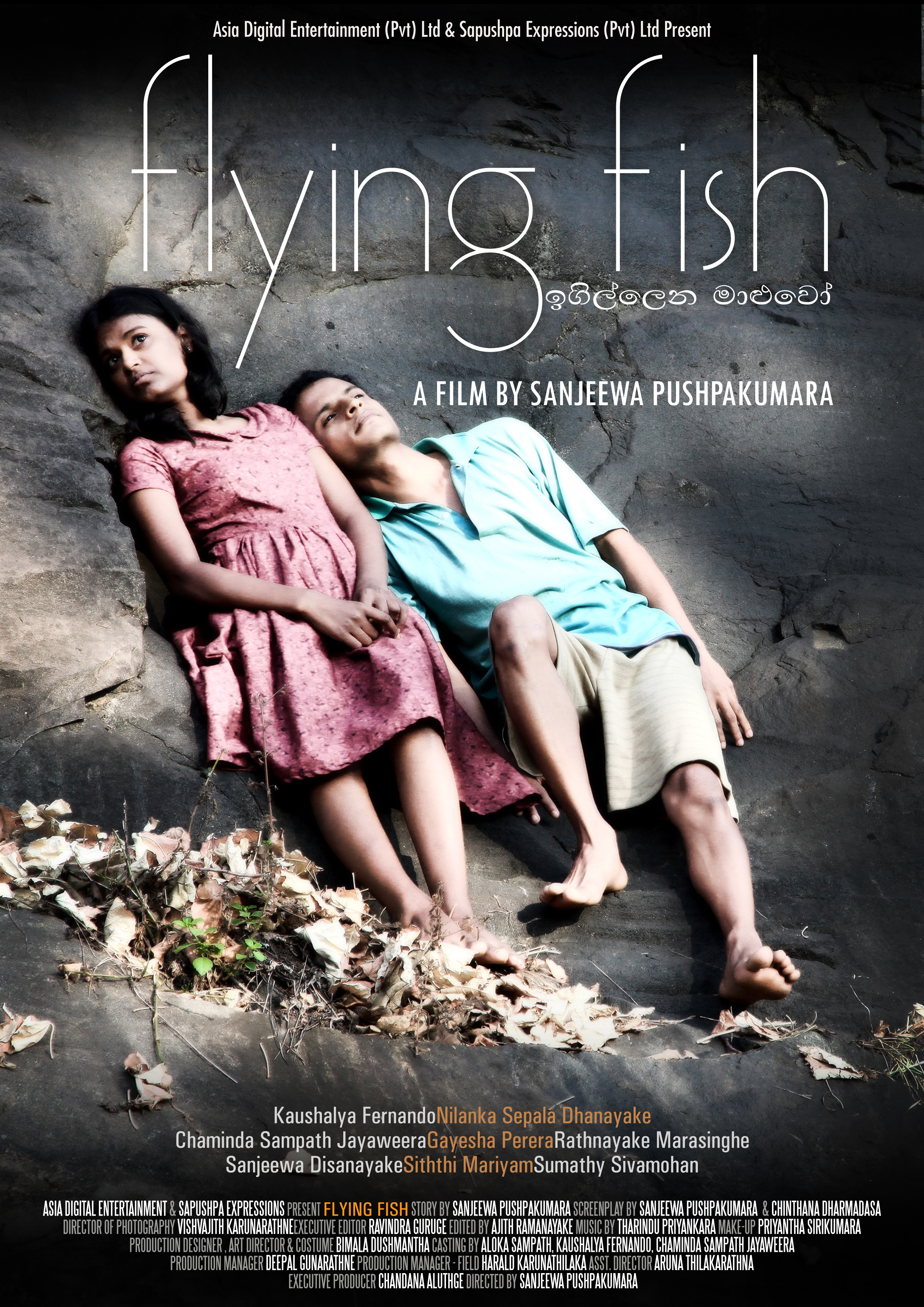
- Directed by: Sanjeewa Pushpakumara
- Screenplay by: Sanjeewa Pushpakumara & Chinthana Dharamadasa
- Story by: Sanjeewa Pushpakumara
- Produced by: Manohan Nanyakkara & Sanjeewa Pushpakumara
- Starring: Kaushalya Fernando; Rathnayaka Marasinghe; Chaminda Sampath Jayaweera; Gayesha Perera
- Cinematography: Vishwajith Karunarathna
- Edited by: Ajith Ramanayake
- Music by: Tharindu Priyankara de Silva
- Release date: 28 January 2011 (Rotterdam)
- Running time: 119 minutes
- Country: Sri Lanka
- Languages: Sinhala and Tamil

Flying Fish (Sinhala: ඉගිල්ලෙන මලුවො) is a 2011 anthology film directed by Sri Lankan filmmaker Sanjeewa Pushpakumara. It was produced with the financial support of the Hubert Bals Fund of the International Film Festival Rotterdam (IFFR). The film made its world premiere on 28 January 2011, as part of the Rotterdam festival's Tiger Awards Competition. The film has been noted for its political value, beautiful cinematography, long takes, and shocking violence.

The film draws on stories from the director's life in his hometown of Trincomalee, Sri Lanka, where Flying Fish was shot.

== Synopsis ==
The film weaves together three narratives set against the backdrop of the Sri Lankan Civil War.

=== Wasana and Soldier ===
A young Sinhalese village woman falls in love with an army soldier and becomes pregnant. The couple attempts to abort the child but fails. While they are making love in the ruins of an abandoned building, her father sees them. While he does not confront her about what he has seen, the scene haunts him. As the war intensifies, adult villagers are recruited into the civil defense force to protect the village border. Among these recruits is her father, who is punished and humiliated by the soldiers from her lover's platoon for not being on guard one day. Demoralized, he shoots himself inside an empty bunker. Meanwhile, the soldier and his platoon receive a transfer to a distant posting, leaving the woman in great agony. Tortured by her father's suicide and her rage at the soldier who leaves her pregnant, she flees the village.

=== Son and Mother ===
A recently widowed Sinhalese woman lives with her eight children in a remote village where the armed tension between the government army and the Liberation Tigers of Tamil Tigers (L.I.T.E), escalates. Stricken with extreme poverty, she becomes a curd vendor. She also becomes involved in an affair with a young man who owns a shop in the village. Her eldest son is in his first year of high school. To support the family, he works in the local fish market selling fish. Meanwhile, he falls in love with a girl at his school. He is humiliated when their relationship is revealed to the school. Meanwhile, rumors spread about his mother's affair. One day, the boy sees his mother having sexual intercourse with her lover in a broken house. The enraged boy stabs his mother in front of his siblings the same evening.

=== Tamil Girl ===
A Tamil schoolgirl experiences her first menstrual period while in a bus on her way home after school. This is revealed when an army soldier subjects her to a security check at an army-controlled roadblock. Her father is a clerk and her mother is a housewife; they live in a rural village in Eastern Sri Lanka, where the war between the state army and the L.T.T.E. has been intensifying. The Tamil Tigers secretly conduct their propaganda lectures in schools, demanding a separate Tamil Eelam state and justifying their war against the Sinhala-dominated southern government army. One night, the L.T.T.E. forcibly enter the Tamil girl's house and demand a sum of money that the family can scarcely afford. They threaten to conscript the girl if her family fails to pay the money. On the night that her parents are supposed to pay the demanded money, the child slips away from the house just as the L.T.T.E visit them. Since the L.T.T.E. get neither the money nor the girl, they gun down her parents.

== Cast ==
- Kaushalya Fernando
- Rathnayaka Marasinghe
- Chaminda Sampath Jayaweera
- Gayesha Perera
- Siththi Mariyam
- Sanjeewa Dissanayake
- Sumathy Sivamohan
- Nilanka Dahanayake
- Thissa Bandaranayaka
- Wasanthi Ranwala
- Mohammed Ali Rajabdeen

== Reception and controversy ==
Flying Fish has been highly praised by renowned film personalities Tony Rayns and Ian Christie, to name some, below are excerpts from their reviews:

- "The film Is scrupulously non-partisan, deeply humane, sexually candid, coolly modernist in style and almost indecently beautiful." —Tony Rayns
- "...stories filled with rage, suffering, sexual abandon and calamity, but the director films them with cool detachment... A work of remarkable restraint. Sri Lankan Cinema has found its true modernist" —Tony Rayns
- "Flying Fish offers an extraordinary journey to the heart of Sri Lankan darkness with no less vivid, sensual images. Set during the 25-year civil war that convulsed Sri Lanka, Pushpakumara's remarkable debut draws on his own experience growing up in a remote village, where ordinary lives were degraded by the struggle between Tamil Tigers and government forces (shown as equally brutal). Recurrent close-up images of exotic insects and landscapes of startling beauty intersperse scenes of sexual exploitation, making this a far from comfortable films to watch. But there's no denying its impassioned originality." —Ian Christie

Film banned by Sri Lankan Government in Sri Lanka and internationally

The film made its Sri Lankan premiere in Colombo on 11 July 2013, despite having been initially released in 2011. The film sparked immediate controversy, leading the government to ban it. The government claims that the film "insults the security forces" and that it illegally used images of the Sri Lankan military uniform, both of which Pushpakumara denies. According to BBC News and Associated Press reports, the Sri Lankan police are currently conducting a "fact-finding investigation" into the film and have questioned its cast and production crew. Local Sinhala news sources reported that even Pushpakumara's mother, who prepared meals for the cast and crew during the filming, has been questioned by authorities. Sri Lanka's Free Media Movement has been variously cited as criticizing both the censorship of the film and this investigation, stating that they represented the government's desire to "militarise arts and culture." There is, however, no trace of such a statement emanating from the organization.

== Awards ==
- Best Director Award, New Territories Competition / St.Petersburg International Film Festival- KINOFORUM 2011
- Best Asian Film, NETPAC award, 4th Bengaluru International Film Festival
- Blue Chameleon Award, 5th CinDi IFF aka Cinema Digital International Film Festival, Seoul, South Korea
- Best Asian Cinematographer 2011(Nominated), Asian Film Awards, Hong Kong
- Special Jury Mention for Red Chameleon Award, 5th CinDi IFF aka Cinema Digital International Film Festival, Seoul, South Korea
- Critic's Choice Award, 5th New Jersey South Asian Film Festival, USA
- Tiger Award (Nominated) / 40th International Film Festival Rotterdam
- Golden Montgolfier Award (Nominated),34th 3 continents IFF
- New Directors Award (Nominated) / 37th Seattle International Film Festival
- Lino Miccichè Award (Nominated) / 47th Pesaro International Film Festival (Mostra Internazionale de Nuova Cinema)
- Silesian Film Award (Nominated) / Ars Independent International Film Festival 2011 Katowice
- Best Film (Nominated) Tokyo FILMeX IFF
- Fipresci Award (Nominated) 36th Hong Kong IFF
- SIGNIS Award (Nominated) 36th Hong Kong IFF
- Asia Pacific Screening Awards (In Competition)

== Festivals ==
- 40th Rotterdam International Film Festival – the Netherlands 26 January-6 February 2011
- 37th Seattle IFF, Seattle, USA – 19 May – 12 June 2011.
- 1st Ars International Film Festival Katowich, Poland, 15–19 June 2011
- 47th Pesaro IFF, Italy – 19–27 June 2011
- Museum of Modern Art (aka MoMA) – New York, USA – 7–13 July 2011 – Under Contemporary Asian Cinema Series.
- Cinematek (The Belgian Royal Film archive)- Brussels, 1–14 July 2011 for L’Age d’or prize and the Cinédécouvertes Prizes
- 2nd St. Petersburg IFF (aka Kino Forum), St. Petersburg, Russia – 10–15 July 2011.
- 5th CinDi IFF aka Cinema Digital International Film Festival, 17 to 23 August 2011, Seoul, South Korea
- 11th Indie World Film Festival, 1 –29 September September, 2011, Brazil.
- 30th Vancouver International Film Festival – 29 September – 14 October 2011, Canada
- London Film Festival (LBF) – 13–28 October 2011, London
- Hawaii International Film Festival, 13–23 October 2011, USA.
- 47th Chicago IFF, Chicago, USA – 6–20 October 2011 – World Cinema.
- New Jersey South Asian Film Festival, 21–23 October 2011, USA
- 52nd Thessaloniki International Film Festival, 4–13 November 2011, New Horizon section, Greece
- 3rd i San Francisco South Asian Film Festival, 9–13 November 2011, USA.
- 15th Tallinn Black Nights Film Festival, 16 to 30 November 2011, Estonia
- 12th TOKYO FILMeX IFF, 19–27 November 2011, Tokyo, Japan.
- 34th 3continents IFF, 22–29 November 2011 Nantes France.
- 42nd International Film Festival – Goa, 23 November – 3 December 2011, India
- 4th Bengaluru International Film Festival, 15–22 December 2011, Bangalore, (Asian Competition)
- 10th Pune International Film Festival 12–19 January 2012, Pune, India
- 36th Hong Kong IFF, Hong Kong, 21 March – 5 April 2012
- 18th The Prague International Film Festival Febiofest, 24 March-1 April 2012, Czech Republic
- 2nd Indian Film Festival, 11–22 June 2012, Melbourne, Australia
- 5th Samsung Women International Film Festival, 14–21 July 2012, India
- Annual South Asia conference in Madison, 17–20 October 2012, Wisconsin.
- La Ciematheque ( Special screening), 1 January 2013, France
- Australian Cinematheque – Change : Path Through 20 Years of Film, 8 March 2013, Queensland
- 16th Guanajuato International Film Festival, Mexico, 2013
