= The Prince and the Pagoda Boy =

2010 film

- Directed by: Lưu Trọng Ninh
- Written by: Charlie Nguyen
- Cinematography: Dominic Pereira
- Edited by: Ham Tran
- Release date: 11 December 2010
- Country: Vietnam
- Language: Vietnamese

The Prince and the Pagoda Boy (Vietnamese: Khát vọng Thăng Long) is a 2010 Vietnamese historical drama film directed by Lưu Trọng Ninh. The film recounts the life of Ly Cong Uan from his youth as a Buddhist disciple to his ascension to Emperor of Vietnam in 1010 AD. The Prince and the Pagoda Boy was released in 2010 to mark the 1000th anniversary of the city of Thang Long (today's Hanoi).

The film was selected as the Vietnamese entry for the Best Foreign Language Film at the 84th Academy Awards, but it did not make the final shortlist.

== See also ==
- List of submissions to the 84th Academy Awards for Best Foreign Language Film
- List of Vietnamese submissions for the Academy Award for Best Foreign Language Film
