= The Floating Lives =

- Film poster
- Vietnamese: Cánh đồng bất tận
- Directed by: Quang Binh Nguyen Phan
- Written by: Ngu Nguy
- Based on: Cánh đồng bất tận by Nguyen Ngoc Tu
- Produced by: Vietnam Media Corp & Vietnam Studio; BHD
- Starring: Dustin Nguyen; Do Thi Hai Yen; Tang Thanh Ha; Ninh Duong Lan Ngoc
- Cinematography: Nguyen Tranh
- Edited by: Folmer Wiesinger
- Music by: Nguyen Quoc Trung
- Distributed by: Vietnam Media
- Release date: October 22, 2010
- Country: Vietnam
- Language: Vietnamese

The Floating Lives (Vietnamese: Cánh đồng bất tận, lit. 'Endless fields') is a 2010 Vietnamese film based on a short story of the same name by Nguyen Ngoc Tu. It generated revenues of 17 billion VND in 2010 (around US$0.8 million).

== Origin ==
"The Endless Field" was written in 2006 by Nguyen Ngoc Tu and became a controversial short story at once. BHD (Hãng phim Việt) bought its copyright at a reasonable price. "The Endless Field" was made into the Vietnamese feature film Floating Lives in 2010.

The English translation appears in a collection of NNT short stories titled Floating Lives. The translator is Luu ThanhThuy and the publisher is ASEAN (2013).

== Movie making group ==
The Floating Lives is an co-operational movie of BHD, Vietnam Studio and Mega Media.

- Director: Nguyen Phan Quang Binh
- Producer: Jonathan Foo, Ngo Thi Bich Hanh, Ngo Thi Bich Hien.
- Script writer: Nguyen Ho
- Director of photography: Nguyen Tranh
- Editor: Nguy Ngu
- Cast:
  - Dustin Nguyen--- Ut Vo (in the original novel is Ut Vu)
  - Do Thi Hai Yen--- Suong.
  - Ninh Dương Lan Ngọc--- Nuong (Ut Vo's daughter)
  - Vo Thanh Hoa---Dien (Ut Vo's son)
  - Tang Thanh Ha--- Ut Vo's wife.
