= Đặng Hữu Phúc =

- Born: June 4, 1953 (age 73)
- Origin: Vietnam
- Education: Hanoi Conservatory
- Genre: classical
- Occupations: musician, composer
- Instrument: Piano

Đặng Hữu Phúc (born June 4, 1953) is a Vietnamese pianist and composer best known for his film scores. A graduate of the Hanoi Conservatory, he has penned over 60 works, primarily for film and theatre.

In 2001 he won the Vietnam National Film Award Best Music for The Season of Guavas. Then he subsequently won the Best Music prize in 2005 at the 8th Shanghai International Film Festival for his work on Hồ Quang Minh's film Thời xa vắng ("A Far Time Past") based on the novel of the same name by Lê Lựu.

Đặng is best known as a composer of symphonies and orchestral music, combining this traditional European style of music with elements of traditional Vietnamese music, such as Nhạc dân tộc cải biên. He is also noted in Vietnam for his instrumental music such as piano sonatas.

== Works ==
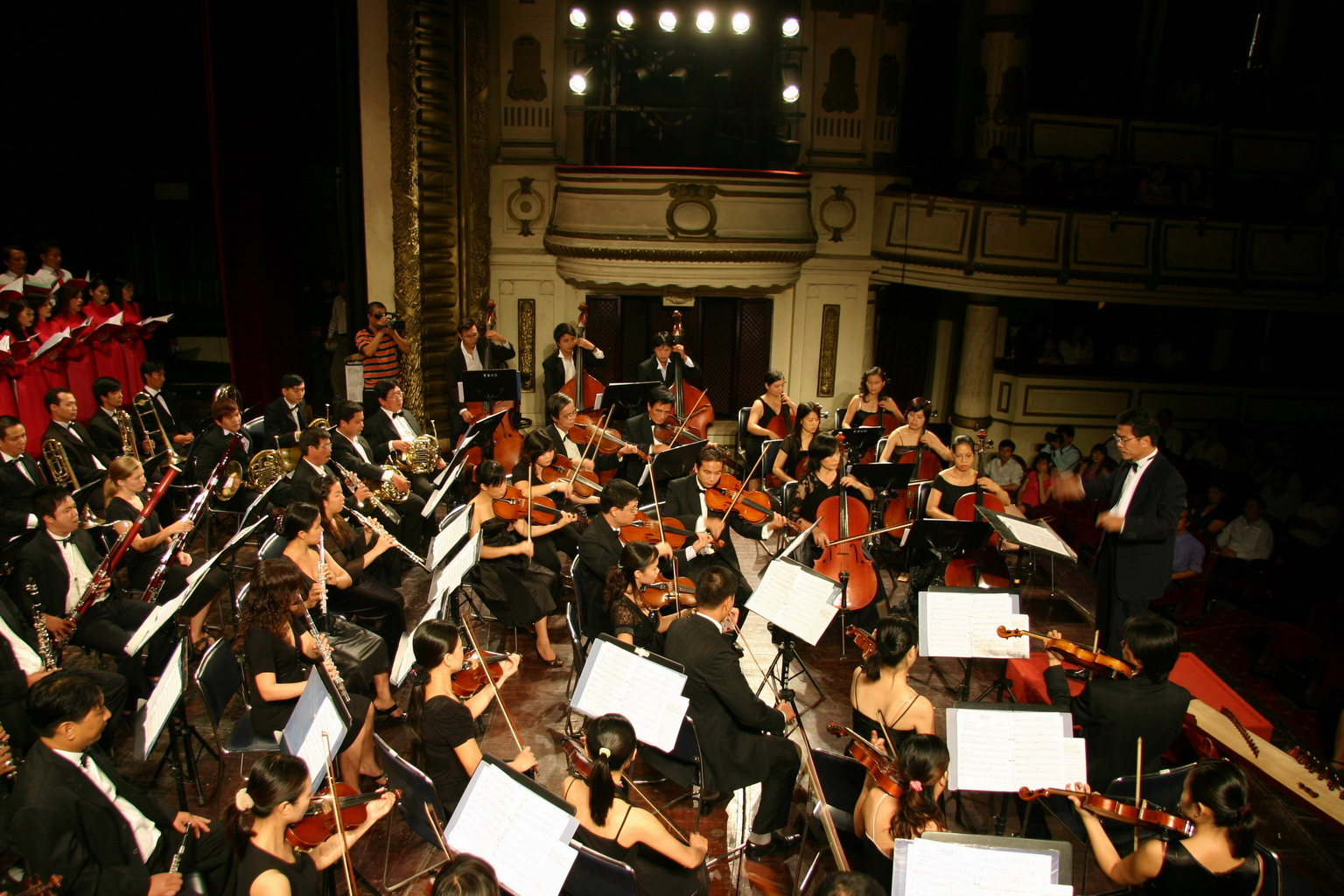
Đặng Hữu Phúc conducting HPT Concert 2009, "Hồn thiêng sông núi" "Holy Land Spirit"

=== Vocal works ===
Đặng Hữu Phúc has experimented with various compositional styles, ranging from classical to Avant-garde music. His oeuvre is divided into two primary genres: instrumental music (chamber and symphonic) and vocal music. He has also composed extensively for feature films, theatrical plays, dance, and puppetry.

Đặng Hữu Phúc has published three books:

1. Selected 60 Romances and Songs with Piano Accompaniment (2012, Thanh Niên Publishing House)
2. Works for Piano: Solo, Four-Hands, Two Pianos, and Four Pianos (2018, Ethnic Culture Publishing House)
3. Works for Chorus, A Cappella, Chamber Music, and Symphony (2022, Ethnic Culture Publishing House)

Đặng Hữu Phúc has written several works for choir and orchestra. His choral symphony to poems of Nguyễn Đình Thi (1973) was performed at the Hanoi Opera House when the composer was only 20 years old. In 2004 10 pieces for a cappella choir ("10 bài cho hợp xướng không nhạc đệm") premiered, again at the Hanoi Opera House.

Phúc is also known for classical songs. In 1974 he wrote Ba bức tranh ("Three Paintings") for soprano and 2 pianos, which was premiered at the Vietnam School of Music by soprano Ái Vân. In 2006 he published the fruit of 30 years work, 60 selected romances for voice and piano (“Tuyển chọn 60 bài Romances và Ca khúc cho giọng hát với Piano”) - the first major Lieder collection by a Vietnamese composer. Several of these songs have been widely performed and broadcast including "Cơn mưa sang đò" ("Rain upon the boat"), "Trăng chiều" ("Moonlit"), “Ru con mùa đông” ("Lullaby of winter"), “Tôi vẫn hát” ("I still sing"). 14 of the songs were submitted for and won the Vietnam composers' award.

=== Film music ===
- A woman pickpocket (Bỉ vỏ)
- A far time past (Thời xa vắng)
- The season of guavas (Mùa ổi)
- Người đàn bà nghịch cát
- Tướng về hưu

== Discography ==
- Đặng Hữu Phúc Phác Thảo Mùa Thu (Vol 1.) CD
