= The Cord of Life (2022 film) =

2022 Chinese Mongolian-language drama film directed by Sixue Qiao

- Promotional poster
- Directed by: Sixue Qiao
- Screenplay by: Sixue Qiao
- Produced by: Yu Cao; Ruoqing Fu; Liu Hui; Chen Yao
- Starring: Alima; Badema; Nahia; Yider
- Cinematography: Yu Cao; Cheng Chang
- Edited by: Yifan Zhang
- Production companies: Bad Rabbit Pictures; China Film Group Corporation; Aranya Pictures; Xiangshan Dacheng Global Culture Development; Cinerent Beijing
- Release dates: October 25, 2022 (Tokyo); March 18, 2023 (China)
- Country: China
- Languages: Mandarin; Mongolian

The Cord of Life is a 2022 Chinese Mongolian-language drama film written and directed by Sixue Qiao in her feature film directorial debut. The film was set in the backdrop of rural Mongolia, especially with the theme revolving around Hulunbuir grasslands in northeastern Inner Mongolia. The film gives a glimpse about the ethnic Mongolian minority who have spent majority of their time in contemporary mainland China. The film had its world premiere at the 2022 Tokyo International Film Festival and it opened to positive reviews from critics while also praising the screenplay, direction, cinematography and creative visuals.

== Synopsis ==
Alus, a young aspiring musician living in Beijing (originally from Mongolia), has developed a keen interest and passion in playing a variety of traditional Mongolian instruments, although he has a strong background in the field of electronic music. He initiates a paradigm shift mindset by incorporating traditional music sounds into electronic music in order to bring a blend of Mongolian traditional culture with the prevalence of contemporary music culture. Despite his unique approach in handling music scores, he also confronts setbacks as he is destined to face a huge dilemma between finding the right balance when he is at the critical juncture to serve as a caretaker for his mother, who has been diagnosed with Alzheimer’s disease, while also recognizing his immense need to fulfill his potential in order to become a full-time musician to prolong his professional career aspirations.

He learnt about his mother's dementia through a phone call and he decided to take her with him to his childhood home in Mongolia. However, things become complicated further when his mother’s condition worsens over time. Hence, Alus takes a proactive measure in order to prevent her from getting lost, and he decides to tie his mother with him using a rope. The rope symbolizes the equivalence of an umbilical cord that helps to elevate the emotional connection between him and his mother’s thought processes, as Alus also acknowledged that his mother has reverted back to an infant-esque situation that requires his care.

== Cast ==
- Badema
- Yider
- Alima
- Nahia

== Premiere ==
In October 2022, the film was premiered in the Asian Future Competition category at the 35th Tokyo International Film Festival. It was also screened at the 2022 Hainan International Film Festival and also at the 15th World Film Festival of Bangkok in 2022. In January 2024, the film was premiered at the 22nd Dhaka International Film Festival.

== Accolades ==
The film received a Special Prize at the Project Market of 2022 Beijing International Film Festival. The film was conferred with the Best Artistic Contribution award at the 2022 Hainan Island International Film Festival, in recognition for the efforts of the filmmakers in incorporating an opening sequence that juxtaposes the title card with an aerial shot of a river stretching over a steppe.
