= Serviam: I Will Serve =

- Directed by: Ruth Mader
- Written by: Ruth Mader; Martin Leidenfrost
- Produced by: Ruth Mader; Dieter Pochlatko; Jakob Pochlatko
- Starring: Maria-Victoria Dragus; Leona Lindinger; Anna Elisabeth Berger; Sophia Gomez-Schreiber; Petra Morzé
- Cinematography: Christine A. Maier
- Edited by: Niki Mossböck
- Music by: Manfred Plessl
- Production companies: EPO Film; Ruth Mader Filmproduktion
- Release date: 9 August 2022 (Locarno Film Festival)
- Running time: 105 minutes
- Country: Austria
- Languages: German; Spanish

Serviam: I Will Serve (German: Serviam – Ich will dienen) is a 2022 Austrian thriller film directed by Ruth Mader, starring Maria-Victoria Dragus, Leona Lindinger, Anna Elisabeth Berger, Sophia Gomez-Schreiber and Petra Morzé.

== Cast ==
- Maria-Victoria Dragus as Sister Philine
- Leona Lindinger as Sabine
- Anna Elisabeth Berger as Sandra
- Sophia Gomez-Schreiber as Martha
- Petra Morzé as Sister Agnes
- Udo Samel

== Release ==
The film premiered at the Locarno Film Festival on 9 August 2022.

== Reception ==
Guy Lodge of Variety wrote that "this supremely well-made chiller announces itself upfront as a cut above your average nunsploitation exercise with its stark, stringent mise-en-scène and jabs of religious inquiry via surreal, Bible-based animated interludes." Muriel Del Don of Cineuropa wrote that the film "works intelligently to combine spiritual challenges, a thriller, and the world of childhood, ultimately transforming innocence into extremism."

Neil Young of Screen Daily wrote that "As a determinedly downbeat exercise in moody atmospherics, Serviam — I Will Serve passes muster."
