= Nguyễn Ngọc Tư =

Vietnamese writer

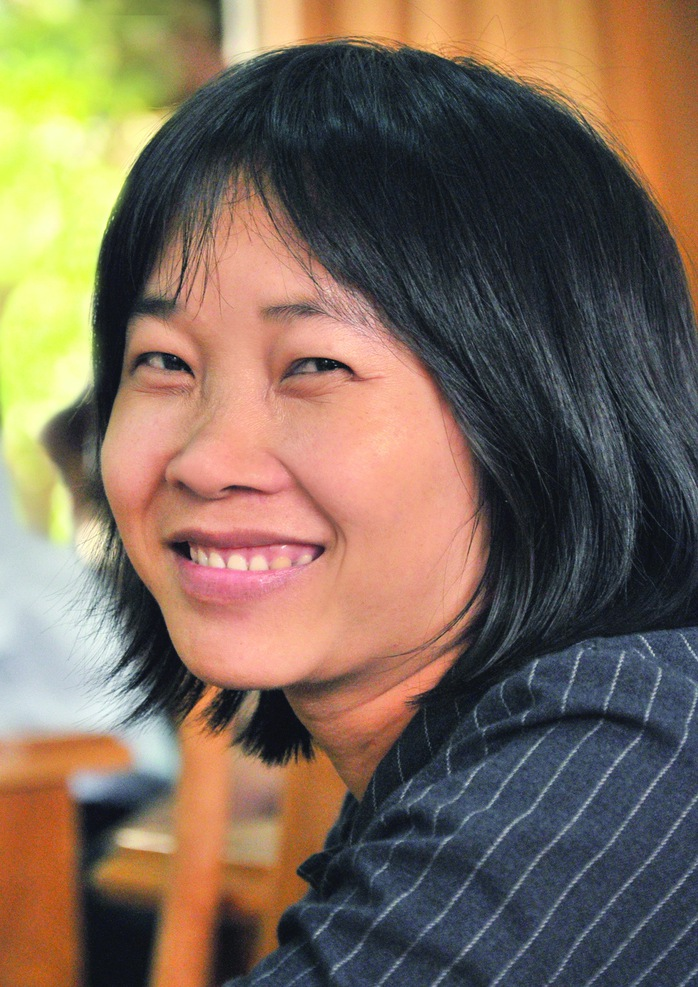
- 2010
- Born: 1976 (age 49–50); Đầm Dơi district, Cà Mau province
- Occupation: Writer
- Writing career
- Period: 2000–
- Notable work: Cánh đồng bất tận – Endless fields

Nguyễn Ngọc Tư is a Vietnamese short story writer and novelist from Cà Mau province in the Mekong Delta. She has received various awards, including the Southeast Asian Writers Award in 2008 and the Vietnam Writers' Association Award for her most famous work Cánh đồng bất tận (The Endless Field) in 2006. Cánh đồng bất tận has been translated into Korean, Swedish, English and French. For this book which is translated in German as Endlose Felder Tư also received the German Liberaturpreis 2018 award by LitProm association at the Frankfurt Book Fair.

Floating Lives, a movie based on the book, has generated revenues of 17 billion VND in 2010 (around US$0.8 million).

The first collection of her stories in English, Floating Lives, was published in 2012.

== Literary career ==
Nguyễn Ngọc Tư's writing career began when her father submitted three of her early short stories, all about friendship in the countryside, to the magazine Văn Nghệ Bán Đảo Cà Mau; all three were accepted for publication. She subsequently worked as a clerical assistant and trainee reporter at the same magazine. During this period, her collection Ngọn đèn không tắt ("The Inextinguishable Light") won first prize in the second "Literature at Twenty" writing contest and the Mai Vàng Award for outstanding writer, and in 2001 it also received the Vietnam Writers' Association's B Prize. She followed this with Ông ngoại ("Grandpa") in 2001, then Giao thừa ("New Year's Eve") and Biển người mênh mông ("The Ocean of People") in 2003.

Her 2004 collection Nước chảy mây trôi ("Flowing Waters, Flying Clouds") gathered six short stories and seventeen essays. In November 2005, the Trẻ Publishing House released Cánh đồng bất tận ("The Endless Field"), which won the Vietnam Writers' Association Award in 2006 and went on to win the Southeast Asian Writers Award in 2008.

The title story of that collection became the center of a public controversy. On 27 March 2006, the Cà Mau Provincial Party Committee's Propaganda Department issued a report criticizing the story for depicting negative aspects of rural society and lacking ideological and educational value; a second report on 12 April reiterated that the story lacked educational direction toward "the true, the good, and the beautiful." Writers Nguyễn Quang Sáng and Dạ Ngân publicly objected to this handling, emphasizing the fictional nature of literature, while some local commentators argued the story did not accurately reflect rural life in Cà Mau. Scholar Nguyễn Trọng Bình later argued that the scale of the debate reflected differing frameworks for literary evaluation as well as the speed of online media circulation.

== Major works ==
- Ngọn đèn không tắt (The Inextinguishable Light, 2000)
- Ông ngoại (Grandpa, 2001)
- Biển người mênh mông (The Ocean of People, 2003)
- Giao thừa (New Year's Eve, 2003)
- Nước chảy mây trôi (Flowing Waters, Flying Clouds, 2004)
- Cánh đồng bất tận (The Endless Field, 2005)
- Sống chậm thời @ (Slow Life in the @ Era, 2006 – co-author Lê Thiếu Nhơn)
- Ngày mai của những ngày mai (Tomorrow of Tomorrows, 2007)
- Sầu trên đỉnh Puvan (The Sorrow Trees of Puvan Mountain, 2007)
- Gió lẻ và 9 câu chuyện khác ('Single Wind' and 9 More Stories, 2008)
- Biển của mỗi người (The Sea of Every Person, 2008)
- Yêu người ngóng núi (Missing You as I Look at Mountain, 2009)
- Khói trời lộng lẫy (Fabulous Clouds in the Sky, 2010)
- Bánh trái mùa xưa (The Confectionery of the Past, 2012)
- Sông (River, novel, 2012)
- Chấm (Dot, poem, 2013)
- Đảo (Island, 2014)
- Đong tấm lòng (Measure the Sincere Heart, 2015)
- Không ai qua sông (Nobody crosses the river, 2016)
- Gọi xa xôi (Call far away, poem, 2017)
- Cố định một đám mây (Permanent a cloud, 2018)
- Hành lý hư vô (Nothingness luggage, 2019)
