= Sanjeewa Pushpakumara =

Sri Lankan film director, screenwriter and producer

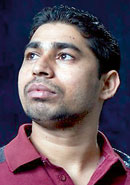
- Born: 5 May 1977 (age 49); Trincomalee, Eastern Province, Sri Lanka
- Education: Chung-Ang University; University of Sri Jayewardenepura; University of Kelaniya
- Occupations: Director; screenwriter; producer

Sanjeewa Pushpakumara (born 5 May 1977) is a Sri Lankan film director, screenwriter and producer.

== Career ==
Pushpakumara completed a Bachelor of Arts degree at the University of Sri Jayewardenepura in 2005. He pursued a diploma in filmmaking at the Sri Lanka National Film Corporation in 2006. In 2007, Pushpakumara received a scholarship from the Korean Culture and Tourism Ministry under its Cultural Partnership Initiative (CPI), to study filmmaking in the Asian Young Film Forum and also to learn Korean at Jeonbuk National University. In 2008, he obtained a master's degree in mass communications from the University of Kelaniya.In 2025, he earned his Ph.D. in Imaging Science and Arts, specializing in Film and Multimedia (Film and Media Production), from Chung-Ang University, Seoul, South Korea—becoming the first Sri Lankan to receive a Ph.D. in filmmaking.

In 2009, Pushpakumara was selected to the Asian Film Academy of Busan International Film Festival. He participated in Berlinale Talent Campus in 2012. In 2014, he obtained an advanced degree (Master of Fine Arts) in filmmaking from the Chung-Ang University in South Korea as a Korean Government Scholarship Holder (KGSP).

Pushpakumara's first feature film, Flying Fish (Sinhala: Igillena Maluwo), received post-production support from the Hubert Bals Fund of the International Film Festival Rotterdam (IFFR). Subsequently, Flying Fish world premiered at the IFFR and was nominated for the Festival's Tiger Award. The film reflects the deep social and psychological trauma of Sri Lanka's twenty-six-year-long civil war. Flying Fish garnered many accolades and the film was invited to more than thirty international film festivals around the world. In a review for the 5th Cinema Digital Seoul Film Festival, film commentator Tony Rayns wrote that, in Pushpakumara, "Sri Lankan Cinema has found its true modernist" and he has also described Flying Fish as "scrupulously non-partisan, deeply humane, sexually candid, coolly modernist in style and almost indecently beautiful".

In 2012, Pushpakumara was invited by the Cinéfondation of Cannes Film Festival to its Résidence programme in Paris to develop his second feature film, Burning Birds (Sinhala: Davena Vihagun). The film received production support from Doha Film Institute and post-production support from the Hubert Bals Fund and Aide aux cinémas du monde (CNC and Institut français).

In 2014, the Biennale College of Venice Film Festival invited Pushpakumara to Venice to develop his third film project Peacock Lament. In 2019, Peacock Lament was also selected by the Nipkow Art Residence in Berlin for advance script development. In 2018, the film project Amma (Tamil: Mother) won Locarno Film Festival's Open Doors main prize. In 2019, the Amma project was also invited to Film Independent's Global Media Makers LA Residency in Los Angeles for advance script development.

Currently, Pushpakumara is the designer of the course and the Course Director at Sri Lanka Film School, the country's first film school.

== Filmography ==
=== Feature films ===
- When Nothing Matters - in development (a film about Leonard Woolf and his time in Ceylon)
- Amma (2020) - in development (won Open Doors Project Development Grant at the 71st Locarno Film Festival, 2018)
- Peacock Lament - (2022)
- Asu (2021)( Director, Co- Screen writer - Sangeetha Nilnadee Godagama, Co Producer - Amil Abeysundara)
- Burning Birds (Sinhala: Danvena Vihagun) (2018) - Director/Writer/Producer
- Flying Fish (Sinhala: Igillena Maluwo) (2011) - Director/Writer/Producer

=== Short films ===
- Lotus Mother (2021)
- Unforgiven (2012) - Writer/Director (screened at the 2013 Cannes Film Festival in the Short Film Corner section)
- An Encounter in the Woods (2009) - Production Designer
- Wings to Fly (2008) - Director/Writer/Producer
- Touch (2007) - Director/Writer/Producer

== Awards and nominations ==
=== Flying Fish (Igillena Maluwo) (2011) ===
- Best Director Award, New Territories Competition - Saint Petersburg International Film Festival, 2011
- Best Asian Film, NETPAC Award - 4th Bengaluru International Film Festival, 2011
- Blue Chameleon Award - 5th Cinema Digital Seoul Film Festival (CinDi), 2011
- Special Jury Mention for Red Chameleon Award - 5th Cinema Digital Seoul Film Festival (CinDi), 2011
- Critics' Choice Award - 5th New Jersey South Asian Film Festival, U.S.
- Best Asian Cinematographer (Nominated) - 6th Asian Film Awards, Hong Kong, 2012
- Tiger Award (Nominated) - 40th International Film Festival Rotterdam, 2011
- New Directors Award (Nominated) - 37th Seattle International Film Festival, 2011
- Lino Micciche Award (Nominated) - 47th Mostra internazionale del Nuovo Cinema di Pesaro (Pesaro Film Festival), 2011
- Silesian Film Award (Nominated) - Ars Independent Film Festival, Katowice, 2011
- Best Film (Nominated) - 12th Tokyo FILMeX, 2011
- La Montgolfière d'or Award (Nominated) - 34th Festival des 3 Continents, Nantes, 2012
- Fipresci Prize (Nominated) - 36th Hong Kong International Film Festival, 2012
- Signis Award (Nominated) - 36th Hong Kong International Film Festival, 2012

=== Burning Birds (Davena Vihagun) (2018) ===
- Grand Prix Fiction and Human Rights (Winner) - 15th International Film Festival and Forum on Human Rights (FIFDH), Geneva, 2017
- Youth Jury Award (Winner) - 15th International Film Festival and Forum on Human Rights (FIFDH), Geneva, 2017
- Special Jury Prize/2nd Prize (Winner) - 17th Tokyo FILMeX, 2016
- Best Film (Nominated) - 21st Busan International Film Festival (New Currents Competition), 2016
- The Ingmar Bergman Award (Nominated) - 40th Göteborg Film Festival (Ingmar Bergman Competition), 2017
- Best Film (Nominated) - 27th African, Asian and Latin American Film Festival (FESCAAAL), Milan, 2017
- Best Film (Nominated) - 32nd Valencia International Film Festival, 2017
- Best Film (Nominated) - 14th ANONIMUL International Independent Film Festival, Romania, 2017
- Best Actress - 3rd Asian World Film Festival, Los Angeles, 2017
- Netpac and Geber Awards (Nominated) - 12th Jogja-NETPAC Asian Film Festival, Indonesia, 2017

== Bibliography ==
- Athmabadda Cinema Rupa – Prasanna Vithanage's Cinema (2007)
- Jump Cut Ekak (A Jump Cut): Cinema from Sky to Earth (2008)
- Korean Cinema and Kim Ki-duk's Film Language (2009)
