= Hồ Quang Minh =

Vietnamese-born Swiss film director (1949–2020)

- Born: Hồ Quang Minh; 1949; Hanoi, (South Vietnam) Vietnam
- Died: 2020 (aged 70–71); Saigon, Vietnam
- Citizenship: North Vietnam (1954–1962); Switzerland (1963–2000)
- Occupation(s): Director, writer
- Years active: 1962–2000
- Awards: ?

Hồ Quang Minh (胡光明; 1949–2020) was a Vietnamese-born Swiss film director.

== Biography ==
Hồ Quang Minh left Vietnam to study in Switzerland about 1962, then worked in France as an assistant on Lê Lâm's Poussière d'empire, before studying in Switzerland and taking Swiss citizenship.

In 1996, his film Gone, Gone Forever Gone was selected as the Vietnamese entry for the Best Foreign Language Film at the 69th Academy Awards, but it was not nominated.

== Filmography ==
- Phường tôi (French title Mon Quartier), documentary 28 min, video, (1982)
- Con thú tật nguyền (French and English title Karma), drama 100 min, 35 mm, (1985) - war film
- Trang giấy trắng (French Page Blanche), drama 100 min, 35 mm, (1991)
- Bụi hồng (English, from Sanskrit Gate Gate Paragate also known as Gone, Gone Forever Gone), drama 85 min, 35 mm, (1996)
- Thời xa vắng (English A Time Far Past, French Le Temps Révolu), (2004) Film music by Đặng Hữu Phúc

== See also ==
- Trần Anh Hùng
- Đặng Nhật Minh
