= 20th Vietnam Film Festival =

Liên hoan phim Việt Nam lần thứ 20 (20th Vietnam Film Festival)
- Opening film: Sài Gòn, anh yêu em
- Location: Đà Nẵng, Vietnam
- Founded: 1970
- Awards: Golden Lotus: Em chưa 18 (Feature); Sống và kể lại (Documentary); Một giải pháp chống xói lở bờ biển (Science); Cậu bé Ma-nơ-canh (Animated)
- Hosted by: Nguyên Khang, Mỹ Linh
- Festival date: November 24–28, 2017
- Website: 20th Vietnam Film Festival

Vietnam Film Festival chronology
- 21st 19th

The 20th Vietnam Film Festival was held from November 24 to November 28, 2017, in Ho Chi Minh City, Vietnam, with the slogan "Building a modern and humane film industry" (Vietnamese: "Xây dựng nền công nghiệp điện ảnh hiện đại và nhân văn").

== Event ==
The 20th Vietnam Film Festival reunites with the coastal city of Da Nang after 29 years since the 8th Vietnam Film Festival (1988). And for the first time in the history of the Vietnam Film Festival, the Feature Film category was absent from the state film line.

This festival has a number of changes, such as removing the direct-to-video feature film category because it is outdated; established the ASEAN Film Awards to honor works in the region. 10 countries in Southeast Asia have brought to the festival international award-winning films, enriching this playground.

4 Golden Lotus awards were given in each category: Feature, Documentary, Science and Animated, along with the Best Film in ASEAN Film Awards. This year, the award for the most favourite film voted by the audience were only for Panorama Program.

=== Participation ===
The cinematographic works participating in the 20th Vietnam Film Festival must be Vietnamese-language films produced by Vietnamese cinema establishments or in cooperation with foreign organizations and individuals and must be free from copyright disputes. Only films licensed from October 11, 2015, to September 10, 2017, will be registered. In special cases, the organizers will flexibly consider.

Remake films can compete and participate in all programs of the event, but cannot compete in the "Best Screenplay" and "Best Film" categories (the Lotus Award).

The Film Festival Selection Board has selected 129 films of all types, from 34 film production units across the country. There were 16 feature films, 26 documentaries, 17 scientific films and 18 animated films. In addition, there are 12 feature films and 10 documentaries in the program "Panorama Cinema". The film "Dạ cổ hoài lang" represents Vietnamese cinema to compete for the ASEAN Film Award. This year, the organizers do not prescribe specific points for each Golden Lotus and Silver Lotus awards. Judges will score from high to low to find the best work.

In addition, 20 films have made the history of Vietnamese revolutionary cinema, from "Chung một dòng sông" (1959), "Chị Tư Hậu" (1963), "Nổi gió" (1966) to "Tôi thấy hoa vàng trên cỏ xanh" (2015) will be screened to serve the audience during the festival. The audience will see once-loved films such as "Mẹ vắng nhà", "Vị đắng tình yêu", "Em bé Hà Nội", "Bao giờ cho đến tháng Mười", "Tướng về hưu", "Ngã ba Đồng Lộc", etc.

=== Jury ===
There are 4 jury panels established at the 20th Vietnam Film Festival. In which, the jury of the ASEAN Film Awards operates independently from the other 3 panels.

The jury for the feature film category consists of 9 members:

- Director Đặng Nhật Minh (Head)
- Director Victor Vũ
- Director Trần Lực
- Screenwriter Trịnh Thanh Nhã
- Cinematographer Đặng Phúc Yên
- Film critic Tô Hoàng
- Painter Vi Ngọc Mai
- Composer Trần Mạnh Hùng
- Actress Nhật Kim Anh

Documentary/science film jury has 8 members:

- Director Lê Thi (Head)
- Director Nguyễn Thước
- Sound director Lê Huy Hòa
- Director Huỳnh Văn Hùng
- Director Nguyễn Trung Hiếu
- Journalist Phạm Việt Tiến, Former Deputy General Director of Vietnam Television
- Journalist Đinh Trọng Tuấn

Animated film jury has 5 members as follows:

- Screenwriter, film critic Đoàn Minh Tuấn (Head)
- Director Đào Minh Uyển
- Animator Lê Thế Anh
- Composer Doãn Nguyên
- Journalist Ngô Minh Nguyệt

The 20th Vietnam Film Festival will host the ASEAN Film Awards (ASEAN FILM Awards). The award is organized at the initiative of Vietnam with the meaning of celebrating the 50th anniversary of the founding of ASEAN. With the theme "Cinema connects the ASEAN community", the award's criteria are towards excellent cinematographic works, filmmakers and cinematic artists with outstanding creativity in ASEAN; at the same time discovering and encouraging new talents of ASEAN cinema. Three prestigious film activists of South Korean, Hong Kong and Polish cinema have accepted to join the Awards Jury:

- Director/producer Jonathan Hyong-Joon Kim (South Korea)
- Screenwriter/producer Roger Garcia, Executive Director of Hong Kong International Film Festival
- Director/screenwriter Karolina Bielawska (Poland)

=== Activities ===
Before the film festival officially took place, on the evening of November 8, the film week to celebrate the 20th Vietnam Film Festival opened in Hanoi. The event is chaired by the Cinema Department, in collaboration with the National Cinema Center, and will be held from November 8 to November 14 in Hanoi and Ho Chi Minh City.

The festival also has many side activities such as:

- Exhibition "Signature of Vietnam cinema through 20 periods of Vietnam Film Festival" (Vietnamese: “Dấu ấn Điện ảnh Việt Nam qua 20 kỳ Liên hoan Phim Việt Nam”)
- Artists exchange with audience, students of Duy Tân University
- Artists exchange with soldiers of armed forces, Đà Nẵng Military Command
- Seminar "Vietnam Film Festival in the development of national cinema" (Vietnamese: “Liên hoan Phim Việt Nam trong sự nghiệp phát triển điện ảnh dân tộc”)
- Seminar "The way to bring ASEAN cinema to the world" (Vietnamese: “Con đường đưa điện ảnh ASEAN ra thế giới”)

Films participating in the festival are screened for free at 3 cinemas Lê Độ, Galaxy Đà Nẵng and CGV Đà Nẵng.

Both of the opening and closing ceremonies took place at Trưng Vương Theater, 35A Phan Châu Trinh, Đà Nẵng City. The Opening Ceremony will be broadcast live on VTV2 at 20:00 on November 24. The Closing and Awards Ceremony were broadcast live on VTV1 at 20:00 on November 28.

== Official Selection ==
=== Feature film ===
==== In Competition ====
Original title	English title	Director(s)	Production
12 chòm sao: Vẽ đường cho yêu chạy	Zodiac 12: Five Steps of Love	Vũ Ngọc Phượng	Skyline Media
Bạn gái tôi là sếp	She Is The Boss	Hàm Trần	Galaxy M&E
Bao giờ có yêu nhau	I'll Wait	Dustin Nguyễn	Dreamscape D.B.S
Cha cõng con	Father and Son	Lương Đình Dũng	(independent film)
Cho em gần anh thêm chút nữa		Văn Công Viễn	Yeah1 CMG, Galaxy M&E
Chờ em đến ngày mai	Until You	Đinh Tuấn Vũ	Thiên Phúc Entertainment, CGV
Cô Ba Sài Gòn	The Tailor	Trần Bửu Lộc, Nguyễn Lê Phương Khanh	VAA Productions, Thủy Design House, K+
Cô gái đến từ hôm qua	The Girl from Yesterday	Phan Gia Nhật Linh	CJ Entertainment, Yeah1 CMG
Cô hầu gái	The Housemaid	Derek Nguyen	HKFilm, CJ E&M
Đảo của dân ngụ cư	The Way Station	Hồng Ánh	Blue Productions, Live Media
Em chưa 18	Jailbait	Lê Thanh Sơn	Chánh Phương Film, Cinebox, HKFilm
Hot boy nổi loạn 2	Lost in Paradise 2	Vũ Ngọc Đãng	Song Ngư Films
Nắng	Sunshine	Đồng Đăng Giao	NT Studio
Sắc đẹp ngàn cân	200 Pounds Beauty	James Ngô	TNA Entertainment
Sài Gòn, anh yêu em	Saigon, I Love You	Lý Minh Thắng, Huỳnh Lập, La Quốc Hùng	Liveon
Sứ mệnh trái tim	Mission of Heart	Đỗ Đức Thịnh	Thiên Phúc Entertainment, CGV

Highlighted title indicates Golden Lotus winner.

==== Panorama Program ====
Original title	English title	Director(s)	Production
Bệnh viên ma	Ghost Hospital	Võ Thanh Hòa	NT Studio
Có căn nhà nằm nghe nắng mưa	Like an Old House	Mai Thế Hiệp, Trầm Nguyễn Bình Nguyên	Fortune Projects
Lời nguyền gia tộc		Đặng Thái Huyền	StyleTV, InfoTV
Nàng tiên có 5 nhà		Trần Ngọc Giàu	Nghiệp Thắng Co. Ltd, Kim Mã Entertainment, Cinebox
Nắng 2	Sunshine 2	Đồng Đăng Giao	NT Studio
Ngày tình yêu	White Valentine	Davina Hồng Ngân	Thanh Long Communication
Ngày mai Mai cưới	Get Married	Nguyễn Tấn Phước	Beta Productions
Nữ đại gia	The Rich Woman	Lê Văn Kiệt	Phim Tiger, Ánh Sao Production
Taxi, em tên gì?	Taxi, What's Your Name?	Đỗ Đức Thịnh, Đinh Tuấn Vũ	Thiên Phúc Entertainment
Tấm Cám: Chuyện chưa kể	Tam Cam: The Untold Story	Ngô Thanh Vân	VAA Productions, BHD
Vệ sĩ Sài Gòn	Saigon Bodyguards	Ochiai Ken	Rhombus Media, Transnational Arts Ent., CJ Entertainment
Yêu đi, đừng sợ!	Kiss & Spell	Stephane Gauger	HKFilm

Highlighted title indicates the most favorite film voted by the audience.

==== ASEAN Film Awards ====
Original title	English title	Director(s)	Production Country
Waris	Descendant	Haji Sapami Abdullah	Brunei
	Benevolence of the Contemporary Mother		Cambodia
Turah	Leftovers	Wicaksono Wisnu Legowo	Indonesia
Hong Harm Tao/หงส์หามเต่า	Swan Lifts Turtle	Jear Pacific	Laos
	Adrift		Malaysia
Eden Yae' Nat Thamee/အေဒင်ရဲ့နတ်သမီး	Angel of Eden	Mee Pwar	Myanmar
Birdshot	Birdshot	Mikhail Red	Philippines
A Yellow Bird	A Yellow Bird	K. Rajagopal	Singapore
Dao Khanong/ดาวคะนอง	By the Time It Gets Dark	Anocha Suwichakornpong	Thailand
Dạ cổ hoài lang	Night Drumbeats Cause Longing for Absent Husband	Nguyễn Quang Dũng	Vietnam

Highlighted title indicates Best Film Award winner.

== Awards ==
=== Feature film ===
Award		Winner
Film	Golden Lotus	Jailbait
Film	Silver Lotus	Father and Son; The Housemaid
Film	Jury's Merit	The Tailor; Zodiac 12: Five Steps of Love
Film	Audience Choice	Kiss & Spell
Best Director		Vũ Ngọc Đãng – Lost in Paradise 2
Best Actor		Quý Bình – I'll Wait
Best Actress		Kaity Nguyễn – Jailbait
Best Supporting Actor		Nhan Phúc Vinh – The Way Station
Best Supporting Actress		Hà Mi – The Girl from Yesterday
Best Screenplay		Bùi Kim Quy, Lương Đình Dũng – Father and Son
Best Cinematography		Lý Thái Dũng – The Way Station
Best Production Design		Nguyễn Minh Đương, Lê Đức Hiệp – The Tailor
Best Original Score		Jérôme Leroy – The Housemaid
Best Sound Design		Franck Desmoulins – The Housemaid

=== Documentary/Science film ===
==== Documentary film ====
Award		Winner
Film	Golden Lotus	Sống và kể lại
Film	Silver Lotus	Việt Nam thời bao cấp Ngày về
Film	Jury's Merit	Bảy “Cồ” - Đồng Tháp; Kể tiếp chuyện hôm qua
Best Director		Nguyễn Hoàng Lâm – Sống và kể lại
Best Screenplay		Đào Thanh Tùng – Việt Nam thời bao cấp
Best Cinematography		Nguyễn Quang Tuấn – Lộc nước
Best Sound Design		Nguyễn Đình Cảnh – Xuphanuvông với Việt Nam

==== Science film ====
Award		Winner
Film	Golden Lotus	Một giải pháp chống xói lở bờ biển
Film	Silver Lotus	Nuôi cấy tinh tử trong điều trị vô tinh nam
Film	Jury's Merit	Thuyền biển Việt Nam
Best Director		Phùng Ngọc Tú – Một giải pháp chống xói lở bờ biển
Best Screenplay		Lê Thị Thanh Bình – Thuyền biển Việt Nam
Best Cinematography		Dương Văn Huân, Nguyễn Tài Việt, Ngô Quý Dương, Nguyễn Xuân Chinh – Khúc biến tấu của côn trùng
Best Sound Design		Nguyễn Vinh Khoa – Muốn về nhà

=== Animated film ===
Award		Winner
Film	Golden Lotus	Cậu bé Ma-nơ-canh
Film	Silver Lotus	Một lần đào ngũ Sóc nâu đáng yêu
Film	Jury's Merit	Truyền thuyết chiếc khăn Piêu; Sự tích hoa phượng
Best Director		Trịnh Lâm Tùng – Một lần đào ngũ
Best Screenplay		Hoàng Phương Thảo, Phạm Sông Đông – Cậu bé Ma-nơ-canh
Best Shaping Animator		Nguyễn Phương Hoa – Truyền thuyết chiếc khăn Piêu
Best Acting Animator		The Animator Crew of Sóc nâu đáng yêu
Best Original Score		Nguyễn Chí Phong – Sóc nâu đáng yêu

=== ASEAN Film Awards ===
Award	Winner
Best Film	A Yellow Bird
Best Director	Wicaksono Wisnu Legowo – Leftovers
Best Actor	Sivakumar Palakrishnan – A Yellow Bird
Best Actress	Mary Joy Apostol – Birdshot
