= Vietnam Civil Aviation Flight 226 =

1979 aircraft hijacking in Vietnam

- An Antonov An-24B similar to the hijacking one

Hijacking
- Date: 7 February 1979
- Summary: Hijacking
- Site: en route

Aircraft
- Aircraft type: Antonov An-24B
- Operator: Vietnam Civil Aviation (CAAV)
- Registration: VN-B226
- Flight origin: Gia Lam Airport, Hanoi, Vietnam
- 1st stopover: Da Nang International Airport, Da Nang, Vietnam
- Destination: Tan Son Nhat International Airport, Ho Chi Minh City, Vietnam
- Occupants: 36
- Passengers: 30
- Crew: 6
- Fatalities: 4
- Survivors: 32

On 7 February 1979, Vietnam Civil Aviation Flight 226 departing from Gia Lam Airport was held hostage by six hijackers using bottles of liquor and grenades, who demanded it be flown to Thailand for asylum. During the ensuing firefight with Nguyen Dac Thoai, an air marshal from the 144th Brigade, General Staff of the Vietnam People's Army, four hijackers were killed and two were apprehended. This was the third hijacking of a Vietnam Civil Aviation aircraft in a short period, following hijackings in 1977 and 1978.

== Aircraft ==
The aircraft involved in the incident was an Antonov An-24, MSN 67302210, originally delivered to Interflug on December 1, 1965, with registration number DM-SBD, and resold to Vietnam Civil Aviation on November 19, 1976. This aircraft had previously been hijacked by Christel and Eckhard Wehage in 1970 while serving with Interflug.

== Summary ==
Approximately 20 minutes after takeoff from Gia Lam Airport, four hijackers suddenly appeared and attacked, pulling out grenades disguised in milk cans and liquor bottles to threaten passengers. They ordered passengers to fasten their seatbelts and put their hands behind their heads, while holding a female flight attendant and a man in airline uniform hostage.

The hijackers forced the captain to divert the plane to Thailand. The captain and co-pilot were forced to pretend to accept the demands, trying to buy time. Lieutenant Nguyen Dac Thoai, an air marshal from the 144th Brigade, General Staff of the Vietnam People's Army, shot and killed three of the hijackers. The fourth hijacker tried to subdue Thoai with a bottle of liquor, but he overpowered and killed him. The remaining two quickly surrendered to the air marshal.

In honor of his anti-hijacking actions, Thoai was awarded the Feat Order by the Vietnamese government and promoted from sergeant to lieutenant.

== In popular culture ==
The hijacking also served as inspiration for director Ham Tran's film Hijacked, released in 2025. In this movie, Binh (played by Thanh Son) is inspired by the air marshal Nguyen Dac Thoai.
