= Kathy Uyen =

Vietnamese-American actress and producer

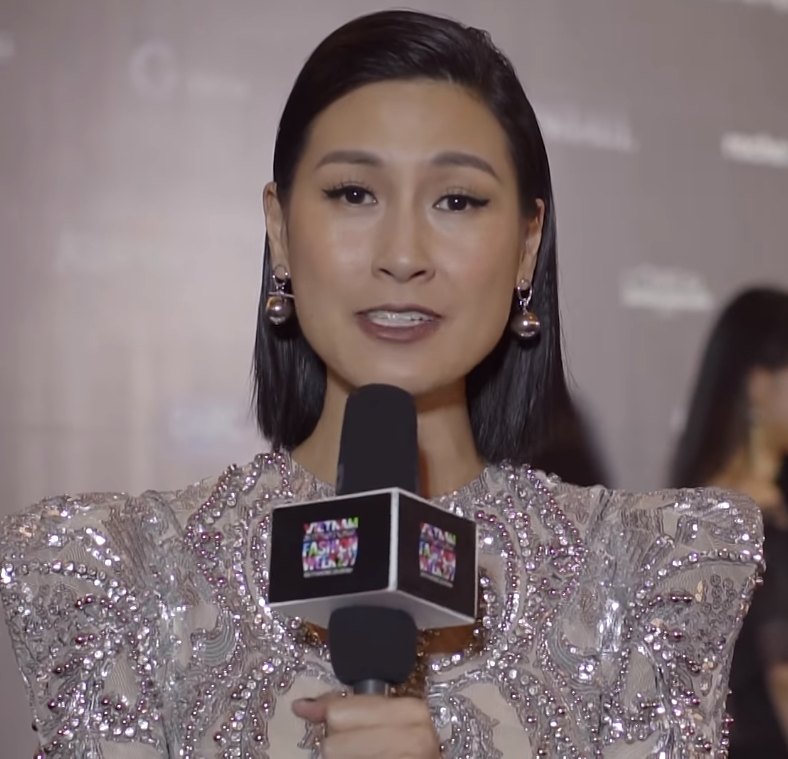
- Uyen in 2017
- Born: April 28, 1981 (age 45); San Jose, California, U.S.
- Occupations: Actress, producer, writer
- Years active: 2004–present

Kathy Uyen (also known as Kathy Uyen Nguyen) is a Vietnamese American actress, producer, and screenwriter. She has twice been the recipient of Vietnamese film industry Golden Kite Awards as Best Supporting Actress in Victor Vu's Passport to Love (2009), and for Best Leading Actress in How to Fight in Six Inch Heels (2013) – a film she also produced and co-wrote. She currently resides in Ho Chi Minh City, where besides acting she is also active as a live event MC and as a goodwill ambassador for various charitable causes (including road safety, gender equality, and Operation Smile).

== Biography ==
Uyen was raised in San Jose, California, and began acting in high school. Initially resisting a career in acting, she studied film and economics at UC Irvine – but ended up interning for DreamWorks and exploring various opportunities within the entertainment industry, at one time working with Warner Brothers and Adam Sandler. Eventually deciding to pursue acting full-time, she moved to Los Angeles and worked as a bartender while attending numerous acting classes and auditioning relentlessly. She acted in a number of indie movies and had several small parts on TV, the most notable of which was a short scene in the popular series How I Met Your Mother.

During her university days, Uyen had met director Victor Vu, which led to a role in his 2004 film Spirits, while producing and hosting an interview show for a local Vietnamese-language channel. It was her supporting role in Vu’s 2009 film Passport to Love that brought her to the full attention of the Vietnamese public, leading to her decision to pursue her career in Saigon.

Following Passport to Love, Uyen won the title role in Charlie Nguyen’s Fool For Love (in Vietnamese De Mai Tinh; Uyen's role was the character Mai), which broke box-office records for opening day in 2010. While she continued to win parts in successive features, Uyen’s concern that her career would be limited as a Vietnamese American led her to write and produce her own film, How to Fight in Six Inch Heels (2013) with director Ham Tran. She continues to work in Vietnamese cinema, most recently with her starring role in Tan Binh Vo’s Triple Trouble (2015) and cameo part in Le Thanh Son's Jailbait (2017).

== Filmography ==
- Jailbait (2017)
- Triple Trouble (2015) - My
- How to Fight in Six Inch Heels (2013) actor, producer, and co-writer
- Dead Trees (2012)
- Rice on White (2012)
- Supercapitalist (2012) - Natalie Wang
- De Mai Tinh (2010) - Mai
- Passport to Love (2009) - Tiffany
- Initiation (2009) - Maria
- Skid Marks (film) (2007) - Lai Mei
- Asian Stories (Book 3) (2006) - Amanda
- On the Rocks (2006) (short) - Julie
- Kieu (2006) - Kieu
- Spirits (2004) - Hoa

== Television ==
- How I Met Your Mother - Julia
