= Green Dragon (film) =

2001 film by Timothy Linh Bui

- DVD cover
- Directed by: Timothy Linh Bui
- Written by: Timothy Linh Bui; Tony Bui
- Produced by: Tony Bui; Tajamika Paxton; Elie Samaha; Andrew Stevens
- Starring: Patrick Swayze; Forest Whitaker; Don Duong; Hiep Thi Le; Billinjer C. Tran; Trung Nguyen; Kieu Chinh
- Cinematography: Kramer Morgenthau
- Edited by: Leo Trombetta
- Music by: Jeff Danna; Mychael Danna
- Production company: Franchise Pictures Classics
- Distributed by: Columbia TriStar Home Entertainment
- Release date: January 19, 2001
- Running time: 115 minutes
- Country: United States
- Languages: English; Vietnamese

Green Dragon is a 2001 American war drama film directed by Timothy Linh Bui and starring Patrick Swayze, Forest Whitaker and Duong Don.

== Plot ==
The film follows the experience of Vietnamese refugees in the United States immediately following the Fall of Saigon at the end of the Vietnam War. Tai Tran has been appointed the camp translator by Gunnery Sgt. Jim Lance. He has arrived with his sister's two young children. Their mother is believed to have been lost in the rush to leave Vietnam.

Despite the despair of leaving Vietnam and having to live in an unfamiliar United States, many of the occupants make adjustments. Minh is silent and solitary until he meets Addie, the camp's cook. They embark on a friendship to the point where Minh is drawn out of his shell. Meanwhile, Tai and his friend Duc find themselves enamored with two female refugees. Tai falls for Thuy Hoa, the daughter of a discredited Vietnamese general. Duc falls back in love with a former girlfriend from Vietnam who is an unhappily married second wife.

== Cast ==
There were open casting calls for actors and actresses in Orange County, California and San Jose, California.

Don Duong had been cast in Tony Bui's 1999 acclaimed film Three Seasons as Hai. Impressed by his work in the film, Timothy Bui asked him to play Tai.

Initially, Bui did not want Patrick Swayze for the role of Jim Lance due to fears that his big name would overshadow the story and message of the small film. However, upon meeting Swayze he changed his mind, as Swayze related to Bui his complete understanding of the film.

- Patrick Swayze as Gunnery Sergeant Jim Lance
- Forest Whitaker as Addie
- Don Duong as Tai Tran
- Hiep Thi Le as Thuy Hoa
- Billinjer C. Tran as Duc
- Kathleen Luong as Second Wife
- Kieu Chinh as Kieu
- Trung Nguyen as Minh

== Production ==
The story was written by Bui's younger brother Tony Bui. Both of the brothers came to the United States with their family in 1975, as refugees from Vietnam.

The setting of the film is Camp Pendleton in Southern California, where the movie was also filmed.

== Release ==
Green Dragon held its premiere on January 19, 2001 at the Sundance Film Festival where it was nominated for the Grand Jury Prize.

== Reception ==
The film received primarily positive reviews although many contended that the film was so sentimental that details were lost. In The New York Times, film critic Dave Kehr wrote that the film was, "not a pernicious film, but simply one that tugs too tenaciously at the heartstrings." Variety praised the actors, "Swayze and Whitaker are effective without especially stretching their acting range, while Duong, who co-starred with Harvey Keitel in "Three Seasons," brings solemn understatement and warmth that serve his role well." However, they criticized the film for its director who "zeros in too unrelentingly on the innocent faces of the two children, the development of the Addie/Minh bond feels calculatedly heartwarming and dialogue too often sounds agenda-driven."

=== Accolades ===
Award	Year	Category	Recipient(s)	Result	Ref.
Austin Film Festival	2001	Best Advance Screening	Tony Bui & Timothy Linh Bui	Won	
Humanitas Prize	2001	Best Independent Feature Film	Tony Bui & Timothy Linh Bui	Won	
Political Film Society	2003	PFS Award for Exposé	Green Dragon	Nominated	
Sundance Film Festival	2001	Grand Jury Prize for Best Dramatic Film	Timothy Linh Bui	Nominated	
Young Artist Award	2003	Best Performance in Film By a Young Actor Age Ten & Under	Trung Hieu Nguyen	Nominated	
