= Đơn Dương (actor) =

American actor

Don Duong
- Born: August 27, 1957; Da Lat, South Vietnam (now Dalat, Vietnam)
- Died: December 8, 2011 (aged 54); San Francisco, California, U.S.

Bùi Đơn Dương, known in his films as Đơn Dương (August 27, 1957 – December 8, 2011), was a Vietnamese film actor, who emigrated to the United States in 2003. He began acting in 1982 and has appeared in over 50 feature films. He won the Best Vietnamese Actor award for his role in the 1992 Vietnamese film Dấu Ấn của Quỷ ("Devil's Mark"). The 1996 film Cỏ Lau, in which he also acted, won Best Picture at the Vietnamese National Film Festival.

== Early life and education ==
Don Duong was born in Da Lat, South Vietnam on August 27, 1957.

== Career ==
His first appearance in a U.S. film was in 1999, with the release of Three Seasons, an award-winning film directed by his nephew Tony Bui and shot in Vietnam.

In 2001, Duong traveled to the U.S. to film two films. In Green Dragon (2001), a film directed by Tony Bui's brother Timothy Linh Bui and starring Patrick Swayze and Forest Whitaker, Duong played a Vietnamese refugee who assisted Swayze's character. In We Were Soldiers (2002), Duong played Nguyễn Hữu An, a PAVN lieutenant colonel who led Vietnamese forces against the soldiers led by Mel Gibson's character.

Upon his return to Vietnam in 2002, Duong was subjected to severe criticism by some Vietnamese citizens and government officials for his involvement in these two projects, particularly for his portrayal as Colonel An in We Were Soldiers where he orders his Viet Minh troops to kill captured and wounded French soldiers. Within a few months, the Vietnamese Actors' Association expelled him, he was banned from working in Vietnam, and his passport was confiscated. Duong wrote a letter to his sons, reflecting upon his ordeal and stating that they "can know the truth, to affirm that I am always and forever not a traitor." The letter was released to the public and published in the Los Angeles Times. In the letter he described the two movies as just "cinema":

Movies must reflect the portrait of history. 'Green Dragon' re-creates the refugee camps full of tragedy and chaos but still not lacking love and fellowship. ... When I portrayed the character Tai, I had to assume the viewpoint of that character, not my own viewpoint. Only idiots who know nothing about movies would confuse Don Duong with the character Don Duong portrays.

As the filmmaking community in the U.S. and elsewhere spoke out against the government's negative treatment of Duong, the government of Vietnam relented and allowed him and his family to emigrate to the United States.

He has also acted in the South Korean film Farewell the River. As of 2006, Duong lived in the San Francisco Bay Area.

== Later life and death ==
On December 8, 2011, he died of heart failure and a brain haemorrhage at the age of 54.

== Filmography ==
Some of his films

Year	Film name	Role	Director, note
1982	Pho tượng	Dũng	
1990	Phía sau cuộc chiến		
1991	Canh bạc	driver Chiến	
1992	Dấu ấn của quỷ	artist prisoner	
1993	Chuyện tình trong ngõ hẹp	electrician Toàn	
1993	Cỏ lau	Lt Colonel Lực	
1993	Tạm biệt sông Ba		Korean: 머나먼 쏭바강
1995	Giữa dòng		video
1996	Bông sen vàng	Trần	Yellow Lotus
1996	Người đẹp Tây Đô		TV movie
1999	Ba mùa	Hải	English Three Seasons
1999	Chung cư		French: L'Immeuble; English: The Building
2000	Đời cát	Mr Cảnh	English: Sand life
2001	Green Dragon	Trần Tài	
2002	We Were Soldiers	Nguyễn Hữu An	USA
2002	vi:Mê Thảo, thời vang bóng	Tam	French: Mê Thao - Il fut un temps English: Mê Thao: There Was a Time When
2004	Ngày Giỗ - The Anniversary	father	director Ham Tran (Trần Hàm)
?	Bản tình ca		
?	Biệt ly trắng	Nam	
?	Chuyện ngã bảy		
?	Ông Hai cũ	Chính uỷ Thắng	
?	Vùng trời cho chim câu		
