= Vietnam Civil Aviation Flight 501 =

1978 aircraft hijacking in Vietnam

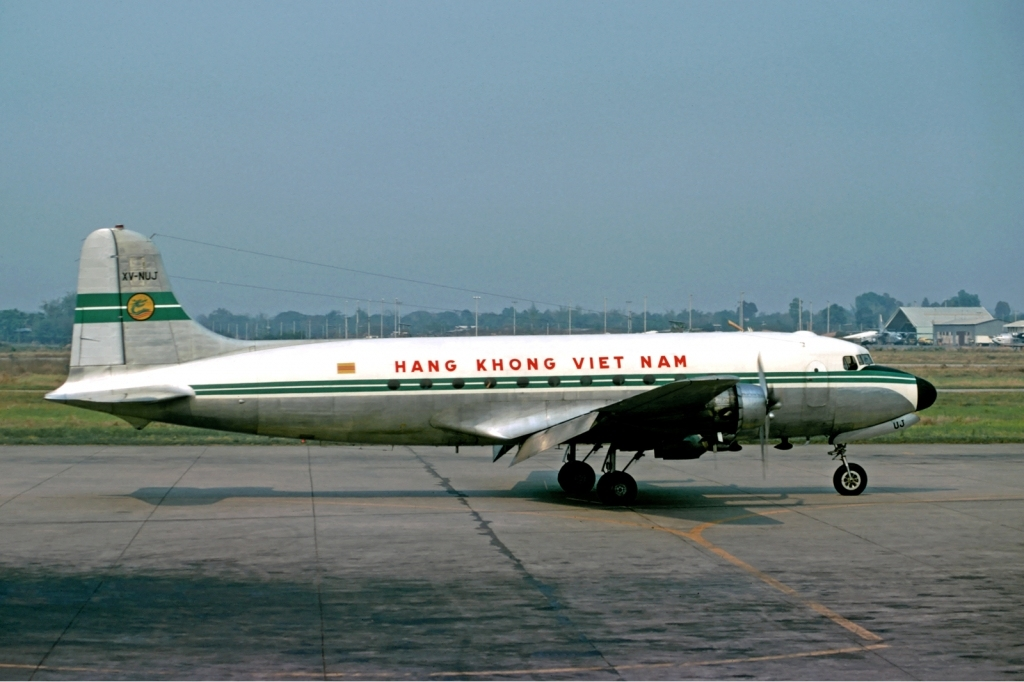
- An Air Vietnam DC-4 similar to the aircraft involved

Hijacking
- Date: 28 June 1978
- Summary: Hijacking
- Site: Tam Ky, Quang Nam – Da Nang Province, Vietnam

Aircraft
- Aircraft type: Douglas DC-4-1009
- Operator: Vietnam Civil Aviation (CAAV)
- Registration: VN-C501
- Flight origin: Da Nang International Airport, Quang Nam – Da Nang Province (old Da Nang), Vietnam
- 1st stopover: Phung Duc Airport, Buon Ma Thuot, Dak Lak
- Destination: Tan Son Nhat International Airport, Ho Chi Minh City, Vietnam
- Occupants: 67
- Passengers: 60 (Including 4 hijackers)
- Crew: 7
- Fatalities: 4 (5) (Note: Some information report that beside 4 hijackers, there is a mechanic also died during fighting with the hijackers)
- Survivors: 63 (62)

On June 28, 1978, Vietnam Civil Aviation Flight 501, departing from Da Nang International Airport to Phung Duc Airport, Buon Ma Thuot, Dak Lak Province, was hijacked by four men armed with Makarov pistols, knives and grenades. The hijackers engaged in a gunfight with the crew and security personnel. During the gunfight, three of the four hijackers were killed by exploding grenades and fell from the plane, while the remaining hijacker was captured. The plane was written off a few months after the hijacking.

This was the second hijacking of a Vietnam Airlines plane (after Vietnam Civil Aviation Flight 509 hijacking) and is considered one of the bloodiest hijackings to occur in Vietnam.

== Aircraft ==
The aircraft involved in the incident, VN-C501, msn 42925, was first put into service in 1946 by KLM Royal Dutch Airlines with registration number PH-TAP. The aircraft was transferred to Air Algérie and Air France before being transferred to Air Vietnam in February 1974 with registration number XV-NUO. After the Fall of Saigon, the aircraft was transferred to Vietnam Civil Aviation for use. The aircraft uses four Pratt & Whitney R-2000 Twin Wasp engines.

== Summary ==
Fifteen minutes after takeoff, when the plane was at an altitude of 2,700 meters (equivalent to 8,858 feet) and entering the airspace of Quang Ngai province, the hijackers (Note: According to Vietnamese press reports, up to nine people were involved in the hijacking, however, only four were actually involved: Chau Dinh Kinh, Tran Van Thao, Chenh Senh Cong, and Chau Dinh Dung. The remaining four disguised themselves as passengers, including the hijacking leader Nguyen Van An, along with his wife Huynh Thi Suong, Phan Ngoc Hue, Ho Thi Truc Mai, and Cao Van Son.) began their attack. All four stood up, smashed a plaster statue of Ho Chi Minh to retrieve grenades, and went into the aisle. They held grenades, pistols, and knives, threatening everyone and pointing their guns and grenades at two flight attendants to force the pilot to open the cockpit door.

Taking advantage of the hijackers' momentary lapse of vigilance, one female flight attendant manually activated the alarm system to alert the pilot and crew in the cockpit. The hijackers failed to achieve their goal and immediately opened fire, shooting four consecutive shots at one flight attendant's legs, and then subduing and stabbing an air marshal multiple times, causing him to collapse. One of the four hijackers then rushed forward and violently slammed the cockpit door. The cabin alarm and gunshots alerted the cockpit crew. Detecting signs of hijacking, the crew, including Captain Pham Trung Nam, quickly sent an emergency signal and contacted Da Nang Airport Air Traffic Control to request permission to return to the airport. Simultaneously, the five-person crew was assigned to protect each other. The two main pilots were tasked with controlling the aircraft, one armed for self-defense. The other two used seats to block the aircraft and axes to barricade the door. However, only the captain carried a gun on that flight; the rest of the crew had left their weapons at home.

Seeing the plane changing course and returning to its point of origin, the hijackers stabbed another flight attendant in the arm and attempted to force open the cockpit door, but failed. The gunman continuously fired at the door. Inside, the crew members returned fire to stop the hijackers. Four crew members inside were injured, except for Captain Nam. Outside, the hijacker, also armed with a gun, was shot and unable to continue his attack. Realizing their hijacking attempt had failed, they threw a grenade at the door to blow up the plane. However, the grenade was thrown with too much force, hitting the door and ricocheting back towards the hijacker, exploding and killing him instantly.

Several passengers and crew members were also injured by shrapnel from the grenade. The grenade exploded, creating a large, table-sized hole in the aircraft's fuselage. The three remaining hijackers survived and, fearing capture, fired at the engine and fuel tank through the hole caused by the explosion. However, due to strong winds, their shots missed their targets. In a panic, the three hijackers broke through the emergency exit and jumped to the ground. Due to the explosion, the aircraft's control cables and hydraulic systems were severely damaged. The crew had to push the landing gear multiple times before they could successfully land, thanks to a system of cables connecting the landing gear which hadn't completely broken.

On October 4, 1978, a military court in Da Nang sentenced the mastermind of the hijacking to death. The remaining accomplices were sentenced to between two and eight years in prison. The plane was repaired, but crashed and was written off a few months later while on a rice aid flight to Champasak, Laos.

== In popular culture ==
A film based on the hijacking, "Hijacked" (Vietnamese: Tử Chiến Trên Không), produced by director Ham Tran, in collaboration with Galaxy Play, released in 2025.

== See also ==
- Balkan Bulgarian Airlines Flight 013
- Cold War
- Ethiopian Airlines Flight 708
- Hijacked (film)
- List of Vietnam Airlines accidents and incidents
- Vietnam Civil Aviation Flight 509
