= Billinjer C. Tran =

American actor

- Born: Vietnam
- Occupation: Film actor

Billinjer C. Tran is an actor/writer/director living in the Los Angeles area. Originally from Vietnam, Billinjer draws upon his personal experiences in his filmic art and poetry. He has written several award-winning poems.

Billinjer had a major supporting role in the film Green Dragon opposite Forest Whitaker and Patrick Swayze. He also had a minor supporting role in the film We Were Soldiers with Mel Gibson.

Currently Billinjer is pursuing acting roles in the Los Angeles area and is developing several feature film projects.

He also has worked in the past as a post supervisor for the Discovery Channel and Fear Factor.
