= Jérôme Leroy =

Jérôme Leroy is the name of:

- Jérôme Leroy (footballer) (born 1974), French footballer
- Jérôme Leroy (composer) (born 1981), French film composer, orchestrator and conductor
