= Lisa Rinzler =

American cinematographer

Lisa Rinzler (born July 20,1953 in New Jersey ) is an American cinematographer who works on both feature films and documentaries. She has worked with Wim Wenders, Martin Scorsese, the Hughes Brothers and Tamra Davis.

== Early life and education ==
Rinzler dropped out of high school to attend the Pratt Institute in New York. Initially studying painting, she then switched to film-making and moved to New York University's bigger film department.

== Career ==
As a graduate, Rinzler shot two short films with Robert Mapplethorpe and one short film with Wim Wenders. She worked as an assistant cinematographer for Nancy Schreiber and Fred Murphy. She moved into photographing documentaries, including The Dead with John Huston, and music videos. Her work with Tamra Davis on music videos led to her working as Director of Photography on Davis's feature film Guncrazy. She and Davis were both then fired from the film Bad Girls for their feminist perspective.

Davis introduced Rinzler to the Hughes brothers who employed her as Director of Photography on Menace II Society and Dead Presidents. Rinzler then shot Steve Buscemi's directorial debut, Trees Lounge, and Tony Bui's award-winning film Three Seasons.

She returned to documentary film-making, shooting part of Wim Wenders' Buena Vista Social Club (film), an episode of Martin Scorsese's The Blues (film series) and the Oscar-winning short Learning to Skateboard in a Warzone (If You're a Girl).

== Awards and recognition ==
Rinzler has won the Independent Spirit Award twice, for Menace II Society and Three Seasons in 1994 and 2000 respectively. She also won the 1999 Cinematography award at the Sundance Film Festival for Three Seasons. Rinzler won the Outstanding Cinematography For Nonfiction Programming (Single Or Multi-Camera) Emmy for Martin Scorsese Presents the Blues in 2004. She was also nominated for the Outstanding Cinematography For Nonfiction Programming in 2013 for her work on Mea Maxima Culpa: Silence In The House Of God.

Rinzler was one of 30 women covered in the book Great Women of Film (2002) by Helene Lumme and Mika Manninen. She appeared in the documentaries Visions of Light: The Art of Cinematography (1991) and Women Behind the Camera (2001-2006).

== Selected filmography ==
- No Sense of Crime (1987)
- The Dead (1987)
- True Love (1988)
- Guncrazy (1991)
- Menace II Society (1992)
- Hookers, Prostitutes, Pimps and their Johns (1993) - tv documentary
- Lisbon Story (1994)
- Dead Presidents (1994)
- Trees Lounge (1995)
- Black Kites (1995)
- Three Seasons (1998)
- Buena Vista Social Club (1998)
- Martin Scorsese Presents The Blues
- An Invisible Sign (2010)
- Mea Maxima Culpa: Silence In The House Of God (2012)
- The 50 Year Argument (2014)
- Hitchcock Truffaut (2015)
- Pope Francis: A Man of His Word (2018)
- Learning to Skateboard in a Warzone (If You're a Girl) (2019)
- Rare Objects (2023)
- Move Ya Body: The Birth of House (2025)
