= Asian Stories =

- Theatrical poster
- Directed by: Ron Oda; Kris Chin, co-director
- Written by: Ron Oda
- Produced by: Kris Chin
- Starring: James Kyson Lee; Kirt Kishita; Kathy Uyen
- Cinematography: Jonathan Hall
- Edited by: Katsuyuki Ueno
- Music by: Thomas' Apartment
- Production company: Flix Factory
- Release date: April 1, 2006 (Chicago Asian American Showcase)
- Running time: 98 minutes
- Country: United States
- Language: English

Asian Stories (formerly known as Asian Stories (Book 3) is a 2006 American independent feature film directed by Ron Oda and Kris Chin and starring James Kyson Lee, Kirt Kishita, and Kathy Uyen. Its running time is 98 minutes; it was shot in Super 16mm format.

== Premise ==
Jim, a Chinese American Los Angeleno, borders on psychotic depression after he is abandoned by his bride-to-be two weeks before their Valentine's Day wedding. His only solution to end his misery is to get his best friend, Alex, an ex-con hitman, to promise to kill him. The two head for the hills, escaping to Jim's aunt's cabin, with the understanding Alex will fulfill his promise sometime before the approaching Hallmark holiday. With the plan in place, Jim finally seems at peace with his life – until he meets Amanda.

== Cast ==
- James Kyson Lee as Jim Lee
- Kirt Kishita as Alex
- Kathy Uyen as Amanda
- Lauren Mary Kim as Katherine
- Luis Fernandez-Gil as Ed
- Christopher Dinh as Minh Phuc
- Eric Hailey as Pizza Delivery Guy
- Matt Witt as General Store Manager
- Michelle Guest as Cocktail Waitress
- Michelle Prenez as Bar Patron
- Kevin Stafford as Howard
- Susie Heckendorn as Southern Bar Patron #1
- Kira Gurnee as Southern Bar Patron #2
- Todd C. Smith as Southern Bar Patron #1
- Dwayne Ward as Southern Bar Patron #2
- C. William Chappell IV as Southern Bar Patron #3
- Lang W. McDonald as The Rainbow Suspender Guy
- Matt Braunger as Deli Customer
- Katsuyuki “Katz” Ueno as Voice of Cook
- Greg Bishop as Gangster #2
- Heather Klinke as Bank Teller
- Alan Achterberg as Pizza Guy’s Friend
- Jonathan Hepburn as Amanda’s Ex-Boyfriend
- Ruth Snyder as Bowling Alley Girl
- Michelle Conry as Coffee Berry
- Gabriel Lozano as Latin Male
- Priscilla Soto as Latin Female
- Mike Dalager as Gangster #3
- Caesar as Kalbi The Dog

== Film festivals ==
1. 11th Chicago Asian American Film Showcase
2. VC FilmFest 2006 Los Angeles Asian Pacific Film Festival—Audience Award
3. 3rd Annual Los Angeles Korean International Film Festival
4. 7th Annual San Diego Asian Film Festival
5. 26th Louis Vuitton Hawaii International Film Festival
6. Austin Asian Film Festival 2006
7. Vietnamese International Film Festival 2007
8. 2nd Annual DisOrient Asian American Film Festival of Oregon
