= Derek Nguyen =

Filmmaker and playwright

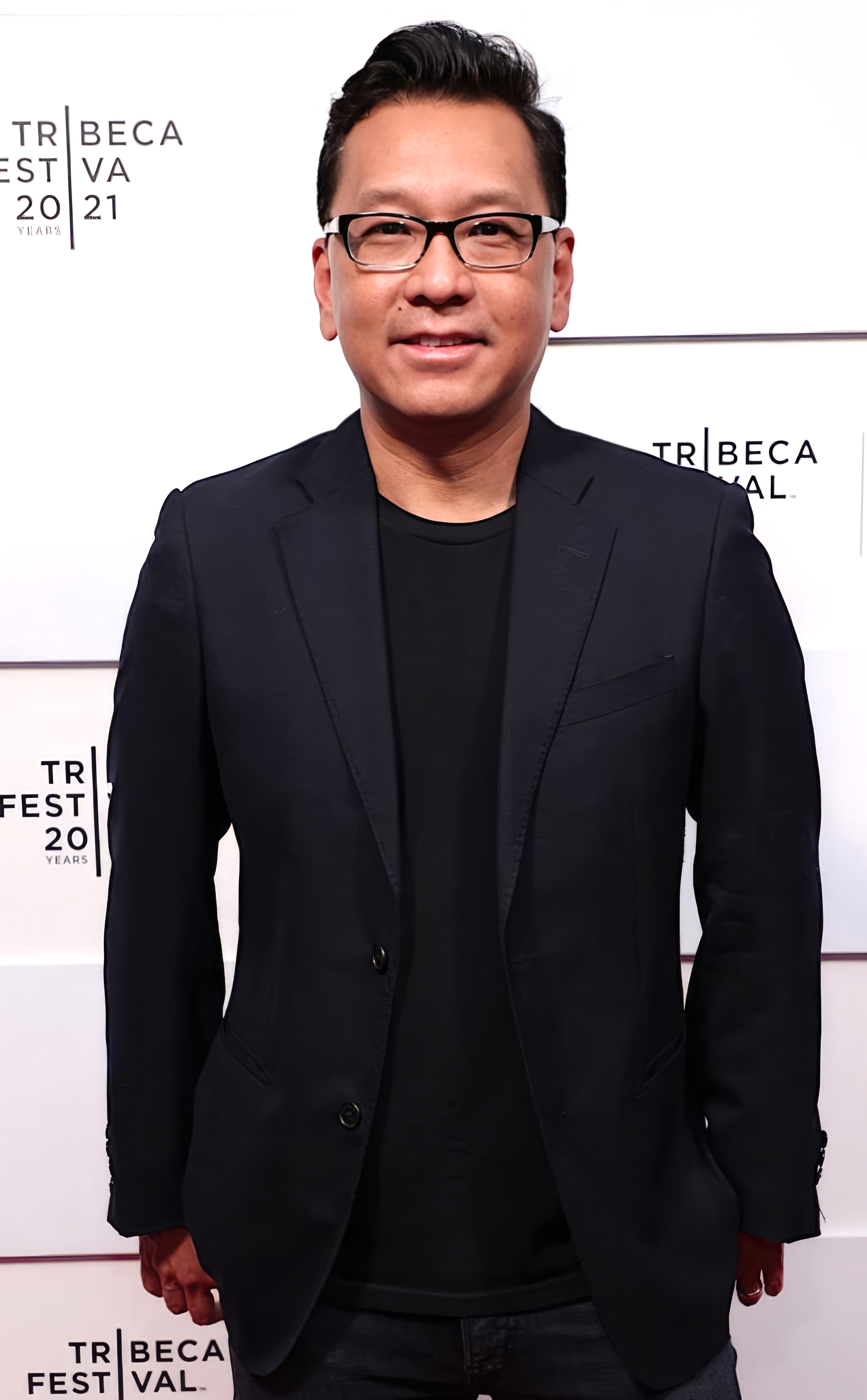
- Nguyen at the 2021 Tribeca Festival
- Born: 1973 (age 52–53); Ho Chi Minh City, Vietnam
- Education: UC Santa Barbara, New York University
- Occupations: Filmmaker, Playwright

Derek Nguyen is a Vietnamese-American filmmaker and playwright best known for his 2016 feature film The Housemaid (Cô Hầu Gái), which was shot in Vietnam and produced by CJ E&M Film Division, HKFilm, and Timothy Linh Bui.

== Early life and education ==
Nguyen was born on February 19, 1973, in Saigon (currently Ho Chi Minh City), Vietnam. In April 1975, his family left Vietnam for the United States as refugees of the Vietnam War during the Fall of Saigon. After being boat people, Nguyen’s family settled in Orange County, California, where Nguyen spent his childhood.

Nguyen studied at UC Santa Barbara earning an undergraduate degree in Dramatic Arts, and attended the Film Producing Certificate Program at New York University’s School of Continuing & Professional Studies.

== Career ==
Nguyen began his career as a playwright. His play Monster was produced at East West Players, Pan Asian Repertory Theatre., and Public Theatre New Work Now, and received an Edgar Award nomination for Best Play by the Mystery Writers of America. In 2004, the Sundance Institute encouraged Nguyen to adapt the play into a film. Subsequently, Nguyen wrote the screenplay and participated in the 2004 Sundance Screenwriters Lab.

In 2007, Nguyen collaborated with theater artist Soomi Kim on Lee/gendary, a multidisciplinary theater piece about the life and death of Bruce Lee. It received three 2009 New York Innovative Theatre Awards, including Best Production of a Play for its run at the HERE Arts Center in New York City.

Nguyen’s 2011 short film, The Potential Wives of Norman Mao, starred Ed Lin, Tina Chen, Cindy Cheung, Ron Nakahara, and was narrated by George Takei. It screened at the Cannes Film Festival Short Film Corner, LA Shorts Fest, and the Asian American International Film Festival, among others.

In 2015, Nguyen wrote and directed The Housemaid (Cô Hầu Gái in Vietnamese), a gothic romance horror film set in 1953 Vietnam during the First Indochina War. It tells the story of an orphaned country girl who falls in love with the French landowner at a haunted rubber plantation. Produced by HKFilm Vietnam, CJ E&M Film Division, and Timothy Linh Bui, the film has been released in 19 territories around the world and is the third-highest-grossing horror movie in Vietnam. It had its North American premiere at the 2017 Los Angeles Film Festival.

In 2019, Nguyen co-founded the production company The Population with producers Mynette Louie and Mollye Asher.

== Filmography ==
- Futurestates: Mr. Green (2010, short) – Associate Producer
- The Potential Wives of Norman Mao (2011, short) – Writer, Director, Producer
- Addicted to Fresno (2015) – Associate Producer
- The Housemaid (2016) – Writer, Director
- Lovesong (2016) – Associate Producer
- Buster's Mal Heart (2016) – Associate Producer
- The Tale (2018) – Associate Producer
- The Long Dumb Road (2018) – Associate Producer
- Catch the Fair One (2021) – Executive Producer
- The Resemblance (2022, short) – Writer, Director

== Awards ==
- 1998–99 Van Lier Emerging Artists of Color Playwriting Fellowship at New York Theatre Workshop
- 1999 Y2K New Voices Play Competition Winner at East West Players
- 2003 Edgar Award Nomination for Best Full-Length Play (Monster)
- 2004 New York Foundation for the Arts Fellowship
- 2004 Sundance Institute’s Screenwriters Lab
- 2006 Urban Artist Initiative Screenwriting Grant
- 2009 New York Innovative Theatre Awards Winner. Best Production of a Play, Best Director, and Best Featured Actress for Lee/gendary (Writer)
- 2013 Center for Asian American Media (CAAM) Fellowship
- 2020 The Starfish Accelerator Fellowship
- 2022 Future Gold Film Fellowship, presented by Tribeca Studios, Netflix, and Gold House
