= Nguyễn Hữu An =

Vietnamese general (1926–1995)

Colonel General Nguyễn Hữu An
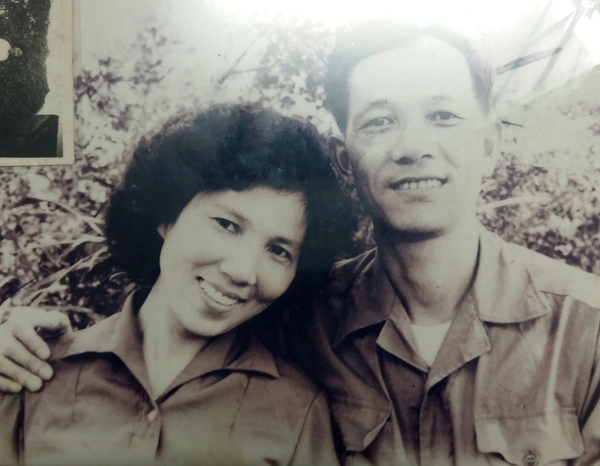
- Nguyễn Hữu An with his wife
- Born: October 1, 1926; Trường Yên Commune, Gia Viễn District (Hoa Lư), Ninh Bình Province, Tonkin
- Died: April 9, 1995 (aged 68); Hanoi, Vietnam
- Military career
- Allegiance: Vietnam
- Branch: Viet Minh; People's Army of Vietnam
- Service years: 1945–1995
- Rank: Colonel general
- Units: 251st Battalion; 174th Regiment; 325th Division; 1st Division; 308th Division
- Commands: 2nd Corps; 2nd Military Region
- Conflicts: First Indochina War; Battle of Đông Khê; Battle of Dien Bien Phu; Vietnam War; Battle of Ia Drang; Operation Lam Son 719; Second Battle of Quảng Trị; Cambodian–Vietnamese War
- Awards: Independence Order; Military Exploits Orders; Liberation Military Exploits Order; Victory Order

Nguyễn Hữu An (October 1, 1926 – April 9, 1995) was a Colonel general in the People's Army of Vietnam (PAVN) active during the Indochina War, Vietnam War and Cambodian–Vietnamese War. He led B3 Front forces in the Battle of Ia Drang 1965, and the 2nd Corps in Ho Chi Minh Campaign 1975 and Cambodian–Vietnamese War (1977-1981).

== Early years ==
An was born in the Truong Yen Commune of the Hoa Lư, Ninh Bình, Tonkin protectorate (Northern Vietnam). He joined the People's Army of Vietnam in September 1945.

== In Indochina War ==
In the First Indochina War, An took part in several decisive battles. He participated in the battles of Bong Lau Pass and Lung Phay in 1949. The following year he took part in the Border Campaign, he was commander of 251st Battalion, a battalion of 174th Regiment (CAA Bac Lang) at the Battle of Đông Khê. He successively held titles of battalion commander, regiment deputy commander participating in actions at Bình Liêu, Vĩnh Phúc, and Mộc Châu. In the Battle of Dien Bien Phu, he commanded 174th Regiment of the 316th Division, and two turns attacked Hill A1 (Éliane 2). On 7 May 1954, his regiment finally overcame French defences on A1 and this marked one of the final actions in the battle.

== In Vietnam War ==
In late 1964, Sen. Col. An commanded the PAVN 325th Division as it infiltrated into South Vietnam. In mid 1965, all three regiments (95A, 101A,18A) of the 325th (325A) Division arrived in the Central Highlands (B3 Front) but the division was dissolved soon later: An was appointed the deputy commander of B3 Front, the 95A stayed in the Central highlands while the 101A and 18A moved to the Coastal lowlands (B1 Front). In November 1965, he commanded B3 Front forces in the Battle of Ia Drang. In early January 1966, An was assigned to form the 1st Division with B3 Front's three regiments: 66th (66A), 88th and 320th. In January 1969, he was appointed commander of the 308th Division. During 1971-1972, he led the 308th in the Operation Lam Son 719, then was detached to command the PAVN offensive at the Plain of Jars in Laos.

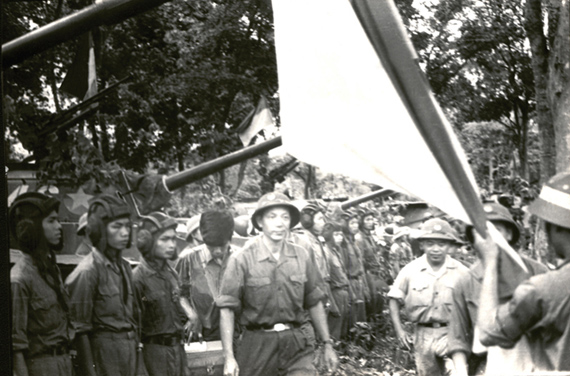
The 2nd Corps commander – Major General Nguyen Huu An and the Le Linh Military Police Commissioner inspects the 203rd Tank Brigade before the 1975 Offensive.

In 1972, An led the 308th Division in the Second Battle of Quảng Trị. In mid-1973 he travelled to the Soviet Union to attend a course on combined-arms warfare.

In 1974 An was promoted to major general.

For the 1975 Spring Offensive, An was commander of the 2nd Corps (Hương Giang). The Corps, under his command, successively captured Quảng Trị and Huế; and in combination with armed forces of Military Region 5 defeated nearly 100,000 regular troops of the ARVN within just 3 days at Da Nang. He then commanded the entire corps to march along nearly 1000 km to engage in the Ho Chi Minh Campaign after having destroyed the ARVN defensive line in Phan Rang.

In the last decisive fight to capture Saigon, 2nd Corps was one of five wings to surround Saigon, and planted the National Liberation Front's flag onto top of the Independence Palace at 11:30 on 30 April 1975.

== After Reunification Day ==
After the end of the Vietnam War, An continued serving in the Vietnamese military. He held key posts in military such as Assistant Inspector General of the Vietnam People's Army (1981–1984), Deputy Chief concurrently Chief of Staff and Acting Commander of Military Region 2 (1984–1987), Director of Army Academy (1989–1991), and Director of Academy of National Defense (1991–1995). In 1986, he was promoted to Senior Lieutenant general (Colonel general).

He was called the "General of Battles" by the famed General Võ Nguyên Giáp.

== Awards ==
The Communist Party of Vietnam and State of Vietnam awarded him with:

- Independence Order of First-Class
- Two Military Exploits Orders of First-Class
- Military Exploits Order of Third-Class
- Liberation Military Exploits Order of Third-Class
- Two Exploits Orders of First and Second-Class
- Victory Order of Second-Class

== In popular culture ==
- An is portrayed by actor Đơn Dương in the 2002 film We Were Soldiers.
