= How to Fight in Six Inch Heels =

- Film poster
- Directed by: Ham Tran
- Screenplay by: Tim Tori
- Story by: Kathy Uyen; Son Pharmacy
- Produced by: Timothy Linh Bui; Irene Trinh; Kathy Uyen
- Starring: Kathy Uyen; Don Nguyen; Petey Majik Nguyen; Truc Diem; Phuong Mai
- Cinematography: Guillermo Rosas
- Music by: Christopher Wong
- Distributed by: Galaxy Studios
- Release date: 17 October 2013
- Running time: 95 minutes
- Country: Vietnam
- Language: Vietnamese
- Box office: 7.5 billion đồng (Vietnam)

How to Fight in Six Inch Heels (Vietnamese: Am Muu Giay Got Nhon) is a 2013 Vietnamese romantic comedy film directed by Ham Tran, and starring Kathy Uyen, who also produced and co-wrote the film based on her own source material, originally written to improve her acting prospects in Vietnam.

The film, made in Vietnam and New York City, had its U.S. premiere on 13 March 2014 at CAAMFest in San Francisco.

The film had its official US Theatrical Release on March 29, 2015 in Orange County, San Jose, Houston, Dallas, San Diego and Seattle.

== Plot ==
Anne is a talented fashion designer who is having a happy life in New York. She owns a stable career and has a fiancé who loves her wholeheartedly. Kiet - Anne's fiancé comes to Vietnam for his business trip.

While chatting via Skype with Kiet, she discovers a red pair of heels in his house. Suspecting that Kiet is cheating, Anne decides to fly to Vietnam to clear everything out.

In Vietnam, she meets her close friend Danny. Anne has a list of three suspects including Bao Trang, Mimi and Ha My. The three are models so Anna wants to investigate each of them.

Danny advises Anne that if she wants to meet them, she needs to enter showbiz by becoming a model. Danny trains her afterward, she picks Thai An as her stage name and gradually becomes well-known leading her to get close to three suspects.

In one event, Anna exposes everything which causes Ha My a scandal, later Anne discovers that Kiet and Ha My are just friends. This incident disappoints Kiet so he breaks up with Anne.

Back to the US, Anne is fired however she is happy that finally, she is free. Anne comes back to Vietnam in order to apologize Ha My. Shortly after, she holds a fashion show and makes up with Kiet afterward.

== Cast ==
- Kathy Uyen as Anne / Thai An
- Don Nguyen as Danny
- Petey Majik Nguyen as Kiet
- Truc Diem as Ha My
- Phuong Mai as Bao Trang
- Yaya Truong Nhi as Mimi
- Mai The Hiep as Huy
- Kieu Minh Tuan as Store Manager
- Hua Vi Van as Tuan (Ha My's boyfriend)
- Sigmund Watkins as George (Anne's colleague)
- Gigi Velicitat as Tino (Anne and George's boss)
- Antoneus Maximus as Rapper Antoneus Maximus
- Thanh My as Bao Trang's daughter
- Bui Vu Long as Binh

== Reception ==
The film grossed 7.5 billion đồng in its first 4 days of release in Vietnam.
