= Hollow (2014 film) =

- Film poster
- Directed by: Ham Tran
- Written by: Ham Tran
- Produced by: Jenni Trang Lê; Jayvee Mai; Nguyễn Quân
- Starring: Trần Bảo Sơn; Nguyễn Ngọc Hiệp; Nguyễn Hồng Ân; Thanh Mỹ; Jayvee Mai
- Cinematography: Nate Fu
- Edited by: Ham Tran
- Music by: Christopher Wong
- Production companies: Vietnam Studio; PS Vietnam; Saigon Movies Media; OPF
- Distributed by: BHD
- Release date: 18 July 2014
- Running time: 98 minutes
- Country: Vietnam
- Language: Vietnamese

Hollow (Vietnamese: Đoạt Hồn) is a 2014 Vietnamese horror film directed by Ham Tran.

== Plot ==
A young girl falls into a river and drowns. When her body is found in a remote village along the river, her uncle arrives to claim her body, only to find that she is very much alive. But when she returns to her family, unexplainable occurrences lead them to believe she is possessed.

== Cast ==
- Trần Bảo Sơn as Vương Gia Huy
- Nguyễn Ngọc Hiệp as Diệp
- Nguyễn Hồng Ân as Chi
- Thanh Mỹ as Ái
- Jayvee Mai as Thức
- Kieu Chinh as Linh
- Minh Trang as Quyên
- Thương Tín as Thảo
- Nhung Kate as Tuyết
- Suboi as Hương
- Huy Ma as Vinh
- Thành Trung as Kiên

== Release ==
Hollow was released on 18 July 2014, in Vietnam. It earned 160,000 admissions in its first four days in Vietnam from 1,140 screenings nationwide. It was first place in the Vietnamese box office on its first weekend, placing higher than the American films A Million Ways to Die in the West, Planes: Fire & Rescue and Dawn of the Planet of the Apes.

== Reception ==
Derek Elley of Film Business Asia gave the film a seven out of ten rating, referring to it as a "thoroughly generic but effective tale of demonic possession from Vietnam".
