= Supercapitalist =

2012 American-Hong Kong film by Simon Yin

- Theatrical release poster
- Directed by: Simon Yin
- Written by: Derek Ting
- Produced by: James C. Chie; Derek Ting; Joyce Yung; Diana Footitt; David Hou; Phillip Yin
- Starring: Linus Roache; Kenneth Tsang; Derek Ting; Richard Ng; Michael Park; Kathy Uyen; Darren E. Scott
- Cinematography: Derrick Fong
- Edited by: Victor Pena
- Production company: Random Art Workshop
- Release date: 10 August 2012
- Running time: 101 minutes
- Countries: United States; Hong Kong
- Languages: English; Cantonese
- Budget: $500,000
- Box office: $15,919

$upercapitalist (also advertised as Supercapitalist) is a Hong Kong–based financial thriller. The film's official release was on 10 August 2012 via the day-and-date film distribution model, thereby being available simultaneously in movie theaters and on cable and Internet video on demand through Warner Bros. Digital and Gravitas. It premiered at the Asian American International Film Festival.

== Cast ==
- Linus Roache as Mark Patterson
- Kenneth Tsang as Victor Chang
- Derek Ting as Conner Lee
- Richard Ng as Donald Chang
- Michael Park as Morris Brown
- Kathy Uyen as Natalie Wang
- Darren E. Scott as Quentin Wong

== Reception ==
$upercapitalist was mostly poorly received by film critics, though it was not widely reviewed. On Rotten Tomatoes, the film has an approval rating of 18% based on reviews from 11 critics.
