= The Anniversary (2003 film) =

2003 live-action short film

- Film poster
- Directed by: Ham Tran
- Written by: Ham Tran
- Produced by: Ham Tran; Lam Nguyen
- Starring: Duong Don; Ngo Thai Uyen; Hue Luong; Son Tung; Chi Binh
- Cinematography: Guillermo Rosas
- Edited by: Ham Tran
- Music by: Christopher Wong
- Distributed by: UCLA School of Theater, Film and Television
- Release date: 19 January 2003 (Slamdance Film Festival)
- Running time: 28 minutes
- Country: Vietnam
- Language: Vietnamese

The Anniversary (Ngày Giỗ) is a 2003 live-action short film written, edited and directed by Ham Tran, about two Vietnamese brothers who meet each other in the Vietnam War. The short film won 25 international awards for Best Short Film and was among the semi-finalists for the 2004 Academy Award.

== Cast ==
The main cast of The Anniversary (2003) is as follows:

- Duong Don
- Ngo Thai Uyen
- Hue Luong
- Son Tung
- Chi Binh
- Jayvee Hiep Mai
- Ngoc Lam
- Thanh Nguyen
- Dat Nguyen
- Ta My Le
- Tran Thi Thu
- Pham Quoc Tuan
- Ky Cuong
- To Cong Dat
- Nguyen Van Hau
- Nguyen Huu Nghia
- Liem Michael Doan
- Thuy Ai
