= Powder Blue (film) =

- Promotional film poster
- Directed by: Timothy Linh Bui
- Screenplay by: Timothy Linh Bui
- Story by: Timothy Linh Bui; Stephane Gauger
- Produced by: Timothy Linh Bui; Forest Whitaker; Ross M. Dinerstein; Tracee Stanley-Newell
- Starring: Jessica Biel; Forest Whitaker; Patrick Swayze; Ray Liotta; Eddie Redmayne; Kris Kristofferson; Lisa Kudrow
- Cinematography: Jonathan Sela
- Edited by: Leo Trombetta; Jamie Selkirk
- Music by: Didier Rachou
- Production companies: Blue Snow Productions; Grosvenor Park Productions; Eleven Eleven Films
- Distributed by: Speakeasy Releasing
- Release date: May 8, 2009
- Running time: 106 minutes
- Country: United States
- Language: English

Powder Blue is a 2009 American independent drama film with an ensemble cast featuring several interconnected story arcs. It was written and directed by Timothy Linh Bui, and features Patrick Swayze's final film role before his death in September that same year. The film saw only limited theatrical release in the United States and was ultimately released principally on DVD in May 2009. The film was subsequently released in Kazakhstan and Russia and on US cable television premium movie channels in late 2009.

== Plot ==
The film begins with a vision – on a dark, windy day, a man stands naked on a beach. He then walks into the sea and drowns.

In Los Angeles, several days before Christmas, Charlie, a suicidal priest, is driving around the city with a loaded handgun and $50,000 in his car. He meets Lexus, a pre-op trans-woman sex worker. He offers Lexus all of his money if Lexus kills him with the gun. Lexus deduces that Charlie can’t kill himself because of his religious beliefs, and leaves angrily. Elsewhere in the city, a woman named Johnny, who works as a stripper in Velvet Larry’s club and dreams of visiting Paris, loses her dog when her landlord kicks it out. Qwerty Doolittle, a nervous, lonely undertaker in dire financial straits, accidentally hits Johnny’s dog with his hearse. He takes the dog back to his house and nurses it back to health, forming a bond with it.

The man from the vision is revealed to be Jack Doheny – an aging gangster dying from gastric cancer who has just been released from prison after serving 25 years. He visits his former associate, who gives him a suitcase full of money as payment for not informing on anyone, as well as an envelope with a lead on how to get in touch with his estranged family. The envelope contains an invitation to Velvet Larry’s club.

Johnny puts up flyers for her missing dog all around the city. Qwerty is about to be evicted from his house. Charlie randomly overhears him talking on the phone and realizes he is in financial trouble. He offers Qwerty his money in exchange for Qwerty killing him. Qwerty realizes that Charlie is not beyond help and refuses the offer. Charlie is revealed to have lost his wife in a car accident on their wedding day. He goes to a restaurant where he passes out. A waitress at the restaurant, Sally, takes pity on him and they eventually bond. However, Charlie backs out when Sally invites him over to her house.

Johnny begs Velvet Larry to let her spend the Christmas Eve with her son, Billy, but he refuses, stating that it would make no difference to Billy whether she is there or not. Jack comes to the club, watches Johnny dance, and later tries to talk to her outside, but is interrupted when Johnny is called back to work. Desperate to see her again, he requests a private dance session with her. Johnny attempts to perform her usual routine, but Jack tells her he just wants to talk and hugs her. Moved by this gesture, Johnny stops dancing for a bit and hugs him back, but then tries to resume the dance, causing Jack to angrily shove her aside and leave.

Johnny goes to a hospital to visit Billy, who is revealed to be comatose. Qwerty notices the signs for the missing dog, but decides to ignore them. Someone steals Charlie’s car, with the money still inside. Charlie deduces that it was Lexus. Jack saves Johnny from getting arrested for shoplifting and they have dinner together. Johnny, who never knew her father, shares her secrets with Jack, including her desire to travel, to find love, and to get to know what her father was like. Later, Jack visits Johnny at Velvet Larry’s club and offers her two tickets to anywhere in the world. He then tells her that he is her father, and that he doesn’t have a lot of time left. Johnny reacts violently and rejects him, causing the bouncers to drag Jack out of the club.

In the hospital, Johnny thinks she saw Billy blink. She talks to the doctor, who tells her that Billy will die soon. Desperate, she tries to seduce him, but he rejects her, stating that there is nothing he can do. Qwerty finally decides to return the dog. He calls Johnny, they meet up, and are immediately attracted to each other. After spending some time together, Johnny disappears, and Qwerty tracks her to the club where she works. There, he watches her dance and pour molten candle wax on her skin. When Johnny notices Qwerty watching her, she breaks down in tears and leaves the stage. Qwerty follows her home and helps her treat her burns, stating that he doesn’t care what she does for a living.

On Christmas Eve, Charlie tracks Lexus down. Lexus takes him to his apartment to retrieve the money, and asks Charlie for the gun, stating that he is ready to fulfill Charlie’s request. Charlie hands over the gun. Lexus recounts the story about how he was in love with another man, but couldn’t give him what he wanted, because he was never a real woman. He then states that no one will ever love him, and shoots himself. Jack visits Billy in the hospital and learns that he is dying. Johnny goes over to Qwerty’s apartment and they spend the night together. Snow starts falling all around the city. Charlie goes to the church he used to work at and angrily prays to God, berating him for all the cruelty he had to suffer. He then passes out and sees a vision of his wife, who tells him that it’s not his time yet.

Billy goes into cardiac arrest. The doctor unsuccessfully tries to revive him. The hospital staff tries to contact Johnny, but she is not home. Jack runs out of the hospital into the snowy weather, desperately trying to call his daughter, but people refuse to help him. He collapses in a back-alley, exhausted by his sickness. He has a vision of himself on a beach, on a sunny day, flying a kite with Billy.

On Christmas day, Charlie is woken up by one of the nuns at the church. She asks him if he plans to re-join the church, but he simply blesses her and walks out. Jack, weakened from cancer and covered in snow, freezes to death. Johnny learns about Billy's death and is completely heart-broken, but at peace with his fate. A nurse reveals to her that all the hospital bills have been paid by a gentleman who wished to remain anonymous, and gives her a gift from him – two plane tickets. Johnny realizes that this was Jack’s final gift.

Charlie goes back to the diner and accepts a date invitation from Sally. Johnny goes back to Qwerty and tells him she has two plane tickets to Paris. They embrace and kiss.

== Cast ==
- Jessica Biel as Rose-Johnny
- Forest Whitaker as Charlie
- Eddie Redmayne as Qwerty Doolittle
- Ray Liotta as Jack Doheny
- Lisa Kudrow as Sally
- Patrick Swayze as Velvet Larry
- Kris Kristofferson as Randall
- Alejandro Romero as Lexus
- Sanaa Lathan as Diana
- Chandler Canterbury as Billy
- Jeffrey Adam Baker as "Slim"
- Ravi Patel as Sanjay
- Don Swayze as The Bouncer
- L. Scott Caldwell as Nurse Gomez
- Riki Lindhome as Nicole
- Billy Wirth as David

== Reception ==
According to Variety magazine, "the heartstring-pulling contrivances of the film, set during Christmastime, go way over the top... Biel often overacts even more than her role requires". The magazine calls director Bui's "trumpeting of the power of love in the city of lonely hearts ... both ear-splittingly loud and tone-deaf at the same time" with "Jonathan Sela's color palette of nightmarish reds and blues and blinding whites, simply enforc[ing] the pic's borderline hysteria".

Rotten Tomatoes gives the film a 25% rating from eight critic reviews with an average rating of 3.7 out of 10."

== See also ==
- List of Christmas films
