= Tajamika Paxton =

Film producer/writer/director

- Born: February 11, 1972 (age 54); Los Angeles, California, U.S.
- Education: Georgetown University
- Occupations: Writer, director, producer
- Mother: Mablean Ephriam

Tajamika Paxton or Taj Paxton (born February 11, 1972) is an American writer, director and producer. Her credits include writing, directing and producing A Fat Girl's Guide to Yoga, written and developed from her interest in yoga and a winner of NBCUniversal's Second Annual “Comedy Short Cuts” Diverse City Festival in 2007. She produced the films Green Dragon—which starred Forest Whitaker and Patrick Swayze and won a Humanitas Award—and Chasing Papi, with Sofía Vergara. She sat on Outfest's board of directors and served as GLAAD's liaison to Hollywood.

== Early life ==
Paxton was born in Los Angeles, California. Paxton's mother is Mablean Ephriam, who is known for the reality courtroom series Justice with Mablean Ephriam and who was a judge on Divorce Court.

== Education ==
Paxton is a graduate of Georgetown University's school of business.

== Career ==
Paxton appeared with her mother on TV One's Life After. She served as vice president of production of Forest Whitaker's Spirit Dance Entertainment production company and as an MTV Films creative executive and was on the development team for Election, 200 Cigarettes, Varsity Blues and The Wood.

She was a board member of the Outfest L.A. Gay and Lesbian Film Festival and was director of programming for Outfest Fusion as well as GLAAD's director of entertainment media. She is an advocate of yoga and serves on the board of the International Association of Black Yoga Teachers.
