= Balkan Bulgarian Airlines Flight 013 =

1983 aircraft hijacking in Bulgaria

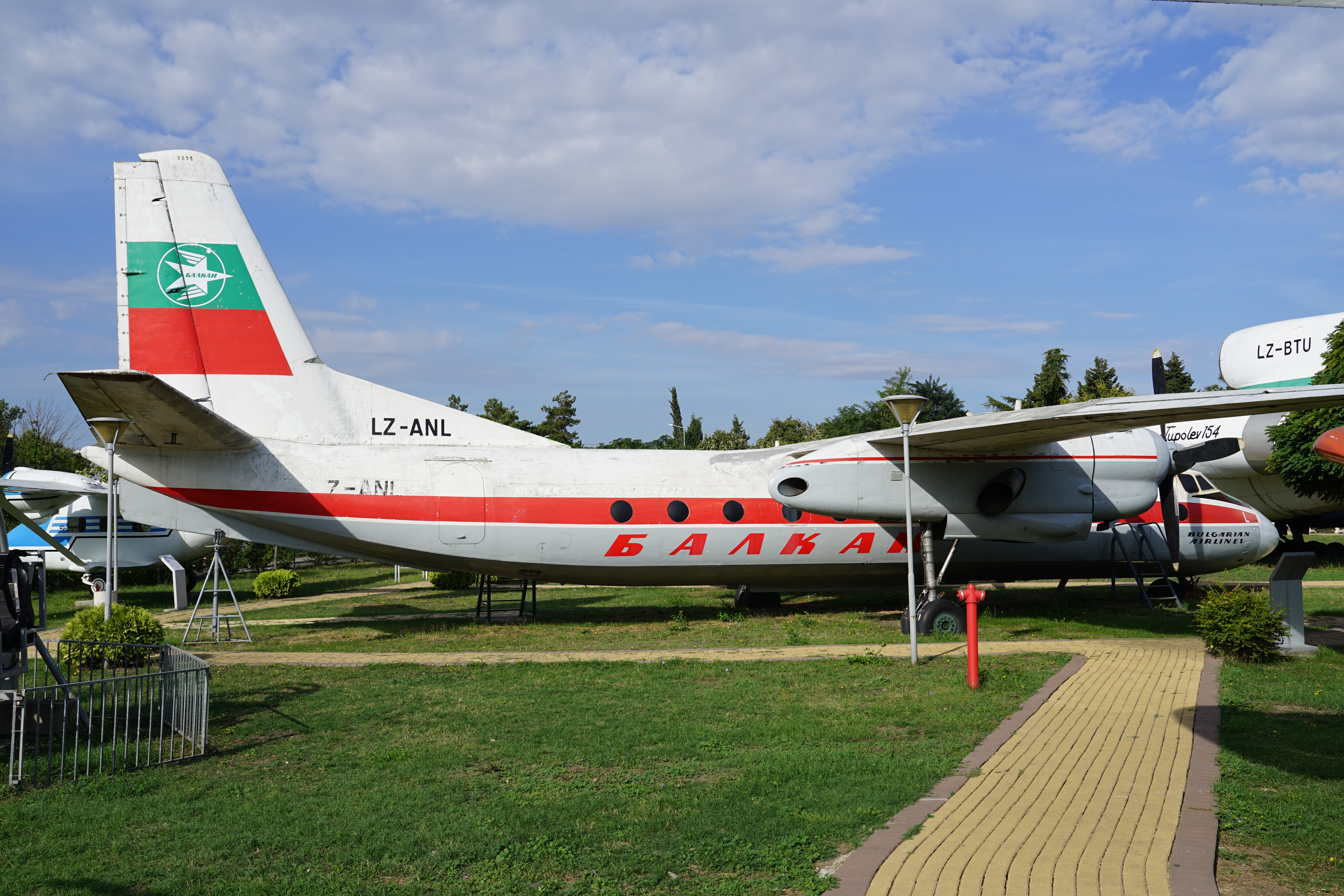
- A Balkan Bulgarian Airlines Antonov An-24B, similar to the one involved in the hijacking

Hijacking
- Date: 7 March 1983
- Summary: Hijacking and subsequent emergency landing and armed intervention
- Site: Varna Airport

Aircraft
- Aircraft type: Antonov An-24B
- Operator: Balkan Bulgarian Airlines
- Registration: LZ-AND
- Flight origin: Sofia Vrazhdebna Airport, Sofia, People's Republic of Bulgaria
- Destination: Varna Airport, Varna, People's Republic of Bulgaria
- Occupants: 44 (including 4 hijackers)
- Passengers: 40 (including 4 hijackers)
- Crew: 4
- Fatalities: 1 (hijacker)
- Injuries: 1
- Survivors: 43 (including 3 hijackers)

Balkan Bulgarian Airlines Flight 013 was a regularly scheduled flight from Sofia to Varna in the People's Republic of Bulgaria operated by Balkan Bulgarian Airlines on an Antonov An-24. On 7 March 1983, shortly after takeoff, the plane was hijacked by four men with knives demanding to go to Vienna, Austria to seek political asylum. The hijacking ended when the pilots deceived the hijackers and landed the aircraft in Varna in near total darkness, where commandos of the Specialized Operational Militia Unit stormed the aircraft, saving all 40 passengers and crew, apprehending three out of four hijackers and fatally shooting one.

== Aircraft ==
The aircraft involved was an Antonov An-24, with registration LZ-AND, that first flew in 1967.

== Incident ==
A Balkan Bulgarian Airlines An-24 was hijacked shortly after taking off at 18:00 local time for a regular flight from Sofia to Varna. Four men, aged 17 to 22 (Lachezar Ivanov, Valentin Ivanov, Krasen Gechev, and Ivaylo Vladimirov), brandished knives and took the 40 passengers and crew hostage. They claimed to the passengers that they were recently escaped recidivist criminals and threatened that they would depressurize the plane if an attempt were made to disarm them or impede the takeover. The hijackers proceeded to threaten the flight attendant and demanded the plane be diverted to Vienna. A passenger was sent to the cockpit to communicate their demands to the pilot, who in turn relayed them to local authorities and received orders to simulate compliance while actually maintaining a course for Varna. Meanwhile, authorities cut off all electrical power to Varna, in order to prevent the hijackers from recognizing the Black Sea coast. After landing at the Varna airport, a Bulgarian police officer and an airport worker who spoke fluent German were disguised as Austrian airport staff as they attempted to convince the hijackers that they were in Vienna and to lure them out of the plane. The hijackers asked for a translator to negotiate their surrender, until one of them noticed that the disguised police officer was wearing a Bulgarian-made leather jacket, which led them to panic and threaten to start executing hostages. At this point, the crew managed to let four commandos aboard the plane through a hatch in the luggage compartment. The commandos stormed the plane, disarmed and arrested three of the hijackers. The only remaining hijacker, Valentin Ivanov, had locked himself in the airplane bathroom and threatened to kill the flight attendant. Two more commandos entered the plane through the passenger hatch, kicked in the bathroom door and shot Ivanov as he attempted to kill his hostage. Ivanov was the only person killed in the incident. The flight attendant, having sustained a wound in her neck and bleeding heavily, was quickly transported to a nearby hospital and made a full recovery.

== In popular culture ==
The incident on Balkan Bulgarian Airlines Flight 013 was featured in the 2023 episode "Deadly Deception", of the Canadian-made, internationally distributed documentary series Mayday.

== See also ==
- 1990 Guangzhou Baiyun airport collisions
- Ethiopian Airlines Flight 961
- Vietnam Civil Aviation Flight 501
