= Passport to Love =

- Movie poster.
- Directed by: Victor Vu
- Screenplay by: Victor Vu; Nguyen Hoang Nam
- Story by: Le Duy Binh
- Produced by: Le Duy Binh; Irene Trinh; Victor Vu
- Starring: Huy Khanh; Binh Minh; Ngoc Diep; Kathy Uyen; Tang Bao Quyen
- Narrated by: Binh Minh
- Cinematography: Peter Soto
- Edited by: Vu Duc Thang; Vu Quoc Viet
- Music by: Christopher Wong
- Distributed by: Infocus Media Group; Wonderboy Entertainment
- Release date: 13 February 2009
- Running time: 110 minutes
- Country: Vietnam
- Languages: Vietnamese; English
- Box office: $172,453

Passport to Love (Vietnamese: Chuyện Tình Xa Xứ) is a 2009 Vietnamese romantic comedy film directed by Victor Vu. Produced by Infocus Media Group and Wonderboy Entertainment, the film was released on February 13, 2009 in Vietnam. The film won Audience Choice and Best Supporting Actress at Vietnam's 2008 Golden Kite Awards.

== Cast ==
- Huy Khanh as Hieu
- Binh Minh as Khang
- Ngoc Diep as Jennifer
- Tang Bao Quyen as Thao
- Kathy Uyen as Tiffany
- Kim Xuan as Mrs. Kim, Hieu's mother
- Nguyen Van Phuc as Mr. Hoang, Khang's father
- Julie Phung Tran as Mrs. Mai, Jennifer's mother
- Quoc Hung as Mr. Tam, Jennifer's father
- Phuong Anh as Katie, Tiffany's daughter
- Huynh Van Dua as Uncle Six
- David Ihrig as Officer Mills
- Justin Ackerman as Officer Dale
- Thanh Van as Tiffany's mother
- Mai Son Lam as MC
- Nguyen Hau as Restaurant manager
- Mai Thanh as Uncle Seven
- Tan Thi as Doctor
- Dao Thanh Liem as Waiter
- Peter Soto as Waiter
- Nguyen Kim Ngoc as Khang's maid
