= Mablean Ephriam =

American judge and actress

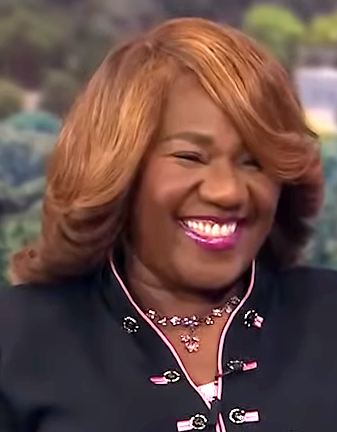
- Ephriam in November 2019
- Born: April 23, 1949 (age 76); Hazlehurst, Mississippi, U.S.
- Education: Pitzer College; Whittier College School of Law
- Occupation: Former prosecuting attorney
- Children: 3 including Tajamika Paxton

Mablean Deloris Ephriam (born April 23, 1949) is an American television personality and former Los Angeles prosecuting attorney. She is best known as the adjudicator of the courtroom series Divorce Court for seven seasons from 1999 to 2006. She was replaced by Judge Lynn Toler in the show's 2006–07 season. Ephriam is also known for her judge roles in Tyler Perry's Madea films.

Ephriam returned to television in fall 2014 with a new courtroom series titled Justice with Judge Mablean. The series, produced by Entertainment Studios, airs on the Justice Central cable channel and is syndicated on various stations. Her daughter is writer/director/producer Tajamika Paxton.

== Legal background ==
Ephriam was born in Hazlehurst, Mississippi but raised in Los Angeles, California, from the age of six. Although she had never actually served as a judge before presiding on Divorce Court, she came to the series with significant legal experience. She started her career as a corrections officer in the Women's Division of the Federal Bureau of Prisons. Ephriam graduated from Pitzer College where she was awarded a four-year academic scholarship, and later attended night classes at Whittier Law School, where she earned her Juris Doctor degree in 1978. In 1982, she opened her own law practice, dealing mainly with personal injury and family law cases. She soon became a Los Angeles County prosecuting attorney.

== Entertainment industry judge ==
=== Divorce Court (1999–2006) ===
In 1999, the television courtroom series Divorce Court was revived a third time for a 17th season, and Ephriam was named the show's arbitrator. She was the first star of the reality-based version of Divorce Court. Previous to that, the show used dramatic reenactments of real-life divorce cases. She was also the first African American and female to preside over the series (the three judges that have followed her also are African American females). Ephriam presided over Divorce Court for 7 seasons, from the 1999–00 season through the 2005–06 season.

While presiding over Divorce Court, Ephriam was noted for her humor. Her audience was frequently brought to laughter by Ephriam's striking and quirky voice and reactions of appall and bewilderment by the ex-couple's outrageous and absurd behaviors.

Ephriam's trademark phrase on Divorce Court was "Look deep before you leap," advising couples to examine each other's behaviors and attitudes carefully before they decide to marry. While Ephriam encouraged litigants to discuss sensitive issues to get to the heart of what was causing their divorce, she was quick to restore order in her courtroom when things got out of hand, and she scolded litigants for disrespectful behavior towards her and each other in court.

In March 2006, it was announced that Ephriam would leave Divorce Court at the end of the 2005–06 season (her seventh behind the bench), reportedly because she and the show's producers were unable to come to an agreement on a contract extension. Among other issues, Ephriam unsuccessfully sought a salary increase. As an additional dimension of the contract discord, Ephriam alleged that she was forbidden from altering her hairstyle for an entire television season, because the network reasoned that her hairstyles were too time-consuming for their hair and makeup team. In a press release statement over the matters, Ephriam stated, "When will FOX and the rest of America accept our cultural differences as African Americans and embrace us with all of our different hairstyles, hair textures, hair color." She was replaced by Judge Lynn Toler, a former judge from Cleveland Heights, Ohio, who formerly presided over the short-lived syndicated courtroom TV show Power of Attorney. On Bailiff Byrd's Bonding with Byrd web series, Toler shared that she is fond of Ephriam, that the two have had pleasant interactions, and that she later had her own objections to Divorce Court production leading to her resignation.

=== Madea films ===
In Tyler Perry's Madea's films, Ephriam portrays a strict and stern judge, who presides over the many cases Madea lands in as a result of violent and destructive conduct. The judge never sentences Madea to prison, instead issuing less severe punishments such as house arrest, becoming a foster mother to a wayward teen (played by Keke Palmer) and going to therapy sessions with Doctor Phil.

Ephriam made a short appearance in the film adaptation of the play Diary of a Mad Black Woman. She also portrayed the same judge character in both Madea's Family Reunion and Madea Goes to Jail. As a note, her first name is pronounced "may-BLENE," as in the Chuck Berry song "Maybellene."

=== Justice with Judge Mablean ===
In the fall of 2014, Ephriam returned to TV with a new court room series, produced by Entertainment Studios. Airing in syndication and on ES's Justice Central network, it is the fifth courtroom series from Entertainment Studios. Episodes are filmed in Culver City, CA.

On May 5, 2025, it was announced that the show would be renewed for two more seasons, taking the show through its thirteenth season.

== Other projects ==
Ephriam hosted an annual event on Father's Day called The H.U.F. Awards, where she leads a star-studded community celebration of otherwise unsung fathers. In June 2010, Ephriam expressed joy and appreciation for the event on The Jazz Joy and Roy syndicated radio show.

... I would love to get some more money to do what I really want to do, but just putting on this brunch for the fathers and allowing them to have a really wonderful Fathers Day, to share in the joy of good music and good food and good entertainment and being out with family, and all of us making a fuss over them, which doesn't happen for most of the fathers ... That gives me great pleasure and great joy. It is also a joy to be able to award scholarships at The H.U.F Awards. I am just so excited about the scholarship recipients! There is the press that we're not going to college--we are going to college. The young people who applied ranged in GPAs from 1.5 to 5 points. We want to encourage all of them to go to college and pursue their dreams.

Ephriam also appeared on the first season of Celebrity Fit Club where she went from 208 lbs to 183, losing 25 lbs, 12% of her body weight. Ephriam revealed to VH1 that she has kept off all of the weight. She added that her weight goes up and down, but she never exceeds 183.
