= Tony Bui =

American film director

- Born: September 14, 1973 (age 51); Saigon, South Vietnam
- Occupation(s): Director, Producer, Writer

Tony Bui (born September 14, 1973) is a Vietnamese-born American independent film director in the U.S., most famous for his 1999 film Three Seasons, which debuted at the Sundance Film Festival and became the first film to win both an Audience Award and a Grand Jury Prize. The film was based on Bui's own experiences dealing with the changing landscape and people of his ancestral home of Vietnam. The film starred Harvey Keitel.

== Biography ==
=== Early life ===
Bui was born in Vietnam and in 1975 came to the U.S. at the age of two years with his family, as a refugee of the U.S.-Vietnamese war, leaving Vietnam approximately one week before the Fall of Saigon. He was raised in Sunnyvale, California, where his father ran a video store which led to his interest in cinema. He studied film at Loyola Marymount University in Los Angeles.

=== Career ===
Bui visited Vietnam several times before making his first short film, the highly successful Yellow Lotus, which debuted at the Sundance Film Festival and went on to play at festivals around the world. His feature debut, Three Seasons, received the Grand Jury Prize, Audience Award and Best Cinematography Award at the Sundance Film Festival and two Independent Spirit Awards nominations. He is a recipient of the Humanitas Prize and a graduate of the Sundance Institute's Screenwriting and Directing Labs. He has written and developed projects for NBC, Warner Bros and HBO, and is currently developing a narrative feature film about Nick Ut's Pulitzer Prize winning "Napalm Girl" photo.

He also co-wrote and produced Green Dragon, starring Patrick Swayze and Forest Whitaker, for his older brother Timothy Linh Bui. He was associated with Lazarus, a film in development at Warner Brothers.

Bui has taught film directing at Loyola Marymount University and previously served on the Board of Directors of Film Independent. In 2023, Bui became Artist in Residence at Columbia University's Weatherhead East Asian Institute and teaches in the university's graduate film program.

Three Seasons returns to the 2024 Sundance Film Festival's 40th edition as one of ten feature films chosen to represent the festival's four decades.

On the 50th anniversary of the fall of Saigon, he curated a film program by the Criterion Collection highlighting overlooked narratives of the Vietnam War. Moving beyond U.S.-centric depictions, the selection included Vietnamese dramas like The Little Girl of Hanoi and When the Tenth Month Comes, and documentaries such as Regret to Inform and Hearts and Minds. Bui’s own film, Three Seasons, offered a poetic reflection on Vietnam’s past and present. The program was presented with the Viet Nam Film Institute and the Vietnamese UN Mission.

=== Personal life ===
Bui is the brother of Timothy Linh Bui, a film director and producer. The two have worked together on several films. He is also the nephew of the Vietnamese actor Đơn Dương.

== Filmography ==
Year	Film	Credited as			
Year	Film	Director	Producer	Writer	Actor
1995	Yellow Lotus	Yes	Yes	Yes	
1999	Three Seasons	Yes	Yes	Yes	
2001	Green Dragon		Yes	Yes	
2005	My Name Is...		Yes		
2008	Dewmocracy			Yes	
2015	The Throwaways	Yes			
2019	Lucy Comes Home			Yes	

== Awards and nominations ==
Sundance Film Festival

- 1999: Won, "Grand Jury Prize" - Three Seasons
- 1999: Won, "Audience Award" - Three Seasons

49th Berlin International Film Festival

- 1999: Nominated, "Golden Berlin Bear Award" - Three Seasons

Portland International Film Festival

- 1999: Won, "Best First Film" - Three Seasons

Stockholm International Film Festival

- 1999: Nominated, "Best Film" - Three Seasons

Independent Spirit Award

- 2000: Nominated, "Best First Feature (Over $500,000)" - Three Seasons

Golden Satellite Awards

- 2000: Won, "Best Foreign Language Film" - Three Seasons

Humanitas Prize

- 2001: Won, "Best Film" - Green Dragon

Austin Film Festival

- 2001: Won, "Best Advance Screening" - Green Dragon
