= Father and Son (2017 Vietnamese film) =

2017 film

- Theatrical release poster
- Directed by: Lương Đình Dũng
- Written by: Bùi Kim Quy; Lương Đình Dũng
- Starring: Ngô Thế Quân
- Cinematography: Lý Thái Dũng
- Edited by: Phạm Thị Hảo; Julie Béziau
- Music by: Lee Dong-june
- Distributed by: Tứ Vân Media
- Release date: 5 April 2017
- Running time: 90 minutes
- Country: Vietnam
- Language: Vietnamese

Father and Son (Vietnamese: Cha cõng con) is a 2017 Vietnamese drama film directed by Lương Đình Dũng. The screenplay was written by Bùi Kim Quy and Lương Đình Dũng, based on a 1995 short story by Lương. It is selected as the Vietnamese entry for the Best Foreign Language Film at the 90th Academy Awards, but it was not nominated.

== Plot ==
When young Ca falls ill, he and his fisherman father Moc journey to the city seeking treatment.

== Cast ==
- Ngô Thế Quân as Mộc
- Đỗ Trọng Tấn as Cá
- Trần Hạnh as Old man
- Hà Trung Hiếu

== See also ==
- List of submissions to the 90th Academy Awards for Best Foreign Language Film
- List of Vietnamese submissions for the Academy Award for Best Foreign Language Film
