= Kiều =

Kiều (Anglicisation: Kieu), is a Vietnamese surname and unisex given name.

Notable people with the surname include:

- Kiều Công Tiễn (fl. 937–938), Vietnamese general
- Kiều Công Hãn (died 967), Vietnamese general, grandson of Kiều Công Tiễn
- Kiều Thuận (fl. 10th century), Vietnamese general, younger brother of Kiều Công Hãn
- Kieu Chinh (born 1937), Vietnamese-American actress
- Kiều Hưng (born 1937), Vietnamese singer of Vietnamese revolutionary songs
- Catherine Kieu (born c. 1963), American criminal
- Lê Kiều Thiên Kim (born 1981), Vietnamese chess player
- Mai Duong Kieu (born 1987) German-Vietnamese actress
- Tien Kieu, Vietnamese-Australian physicist and politician

Notable people with the given name include:

- Lý Ngọc Kiều (1041–1113), Vietnamese princess
- Bằng Kiều (born 1973), Vietnamese male pop singer
- Chương Thị Kiều (born 1995), Vietnamese female footballer
- Hoang Kieu (Hoàng Kiều), Vietnamese-born American businessman

== See also ==
- The Tale of Kieu, an 1820 Vietnamese epic poem, whose title refers to its main character Thúy Kiều
