= Hijacked (film) =

- Directed by: Ham Tran
- Screenplay by: Nguyễn Hoàng Dương; Nguyễn Mai Nhật Ánh; Ham Tran
- Story by: Nguyễn Mai Nhật Ánh; Ham Tran
- Based on: Vietnam Civil Aviation Flight 509, 501 and 226 hijacking
- Produced by: Lương Công Hiếu; Nguyễn Quốc Công; Ham Tran
- Starring: Thái Hòa; Kaity Nguyễn; Thanh Sơn; Ma Ran Đô; Trâm Anh; Võ Điền Gia Huy; Lợi Trần; Ray Nguyễn; Bảo Định; Xuân Phúc; Trần Ngọc Vàng
- Cinematography: Hoàng Trung Nam
- Edited by: Nguyễn Ngọc Nhiên; Lưu Đình Mẫn Thanh; Ham Tran
- Music by: Bruno Brugnano
- Production companies: Điện ảnh Công an nhân dân (English: People's Public Security Cinema Bureau); Galaxy EE; Galaxy Play; HKFilm; PV2 Investment JSC; Toka Studio; KAT House
- Distributed by: Galaxy Studio
- Release date: 19 September 2025 (Vietnam)
- Running time: 118 mins
- Country: Vietnam
- Language: Vietnamese
- Box office: 251.8 billion VND

Hijacked, also known as Death Battle on the Air (Vietnamese: Tử chiến trên không), is a 2025 Vietnamese action thriller film directed, written, co-edited and co-produced by Ham Tran. The film was inspired by three aircraft hijackings in Vietnam after the fall of Saigon in 1975: the hijackings of flights 509, 501 and 226 of Vietnam Civil Aviation (the predecessor of Vietnam Airlines).

== Plot ==
After the Fall of Saigon in 1975, the US administration of President Jimmy Carter enacted a law allowing the admission of Vietnamese refugees who had fled Vietnam to allied countries. This prompted some to seek ways to escape Vietnam in various ways, including aircraft hijacking.

In 1977, a group of men using pseudonyms Co, Ro, Chuon, and Bich (Vietnamese translation of the Heart, Diamond, Clubs, and Spades cards) hijacked flight HVN-137 (based on Vietnam Civil Aviation Flight 509), a Douglas DC-3, en route from Rach Gia to Ho Chi Minh City. During the struggle with the crew, they killed a mechanic and air marshal Minh (air marshal Son's younger brother), and the co-pilot. After controlling the crew, they demanded that the plane be diverted to a foreign country. Binh (an air marshal of the People's Public Security of Vietnam, played by Thanh Son), accused anti-communist elements of being behind the hijacking. After this incident, the Vietnamese law enforcement started to perform training combat skills for air marshals.

In 1978, Binh was given leave by his superiors to visit his wife who was about to give birth on flight HVN-602 (based on Vietnam Civil Aviation Flight 501), a Douglas DC-4. He accidentally met the crew members including flight attendant Tu Trinh (played by Kaity Nguyen), flight attendant Nhan (played by Tram Anh), and guard Son (played by Ma Ran Do). After the flight took off from Da Nang Airport, Long (played by Thai Hoa) and his son Suu (played by Bao Dinh) overpowered flight attendant Trinh and Nhan, demanding to be led to the cockpit. After storming the cockpit, Long and Suu attacked and killed the mechanic and navigator. Although guard Son rushed out to control him, he was also attacked by Ti (played by Gia Huy) and Dan (played by Ray Nguyen) and tied up with a seat belt. After subduing the crew, Long announced through the plane's PA system and threatened to kill everyone if the pilots did not cooperate with the hijackers. Receiving a distress signal from the flight, the air force scrambled a MiG-21 to escort the flight.

Meanwhile, the hijackers continued to shoot and seriously injure Captain Phong (played by Xuan Phuc), using force to torture Nhan to force the pilot to open the cockpit door. Dan hacked into the air navigation to signal the pilot to fly the plane out of Vietnam. In the cabin, Hai (played by Loi Tran) pretended to let his son go to the toilet to distract the hijackers. Taking advantage of the opening, the passengers, crew, along with Binh and Son rushed to overpower the hijackers. However, Trinh was later taken hostage by Ti, along with Hai and Binh. In retaliation, Long tortured Hai and Binh, and also tortured Trinh by breaking her ring finger to force her husband, co-pilot Khanh (played by Tran Ngoc Vang) to open the door. When he tried to grab the pistol from the captain to kill the hijackers, the MiG-21 approached the flight. Long continued to hold Binh hostage and shot him once to force him to order the air force to retreat. Fearing that the plane would be shot down, Dan controlled Long. Meanwhile, Binh used slang to order the pilot to tilt the plane at a 60-degree angle to control and capture the hijackers in the cargo compartment of the plane.

On the ground, the investigation agency quickly identified the suspects, but also suspected that Khanh had assisted the hijackers, because he forgot to bring a pistol, and was also assigned to replace co-pilot Chuong on the day of the hijacking. The security agency asked Khanh to disconnect the communication system, in case he communicated with the hijackers. The flight also returned to Da Nang Airport. Meanwhile, Hai gradually revealed himself as the secret leader of the hijackers, when he argued with his wife about the unsuccessful attempt to bribe co-pilot Chuong to fly the plane out of Vietnam and was worried that both of them would be arrested. While no one was paying attention, Hai went to the cargo compartment of the plane, broke the lock to rescue the hijackers, and also asked the hijackers to pretend to torture him to avoid suspicion. The hijackers opened fire on Son, but the confrontation left Suu and the hijackers seriously injured. In dying moments, Suu advised Long to surrender and continue living. Fearing that he would be arrested by the police after the plane landed, as well as Suu's death due to serious injuries, he threw the grenade from Long's hand to commit suicide with Suu. The grenade explosion caused both of them to fall to the ground and die, while Dan and Ti was executed by Hai to erase all connections between him and the hijackers. However, the explosion collapsed the cockpit door, causing the captain to lose consciousness, while the plane was falling at high speed.

Binh and Khanh regained control of the flight and made an emergency landing. Due to the pressure from the explosion, the rudder lost control of the direction, combined with the nose gear being stuck, forcing Binh to risk jumping down onto the landing gear to assist Khanh in dropping it down. Binh was rescued by Hai before the plane hit the ground. After the emergency landing, police forces, along with firefighters and medical staff, surrounded the plane and took the victims to the emergency room. During the emergency evacuation, Hai forgot to use the urn of his father's ashes as a disguise for a grenade, which was discovered by Binh. Binh criticized Hai for risking the lives of his family and passengers to flee the country. In response, Hai expressed disappointment about the country's economic decline and asserted that he carried out the hijacking to provide a better life for his family. Despite Binh's advice to surrender, Hai opened fire on Binh and tried to start the engine to continue the flight out of Vietnam, but was quickly stopped and killed by Binh.

At the end of the film, Binh returned home to reunite with his wife and newborn child in happiness. Nhan went to Son's house to ask after him and intended to express her feelings for him. Meanwhile, Trinh lost her first child with Khanh due to a miscarriage while fighting the hijackers. The entire crew members and air marshal of flight HVN-602 were awarded the Feat Order by the Vietnamese government in recognition of their anti-hijacking actions.

== Cast ==
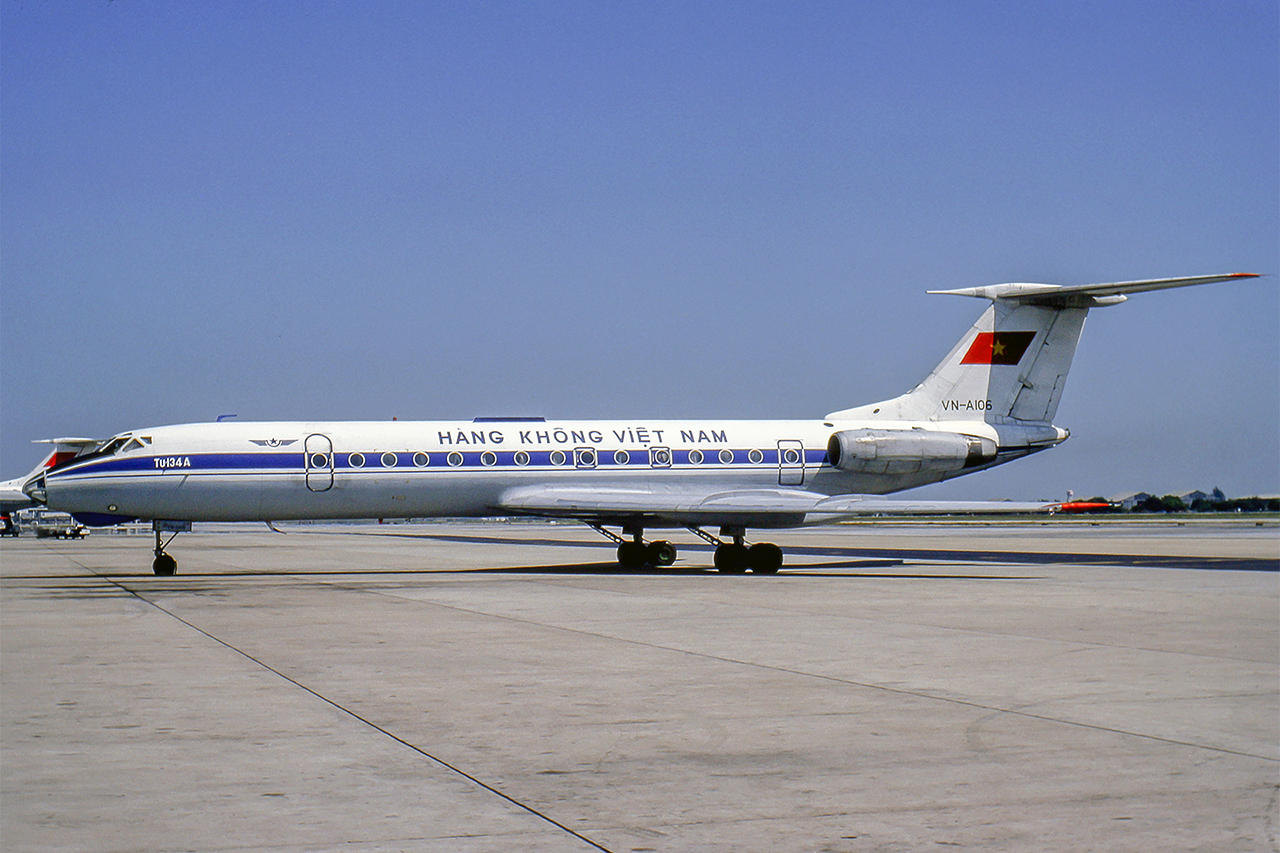
The interior of the aircraft in the film was taken from an old Tupolev Tu-134 belonging to Vietnam Airlines, registration number VN-A106, which was used as a training vehicle for special police forces

=== HVN-602 crew ===
- Kaity Nguyen as Tu Trinh, flight attendant
- Thanh Son as Binh, air marshal
- Ma Ran Do as Son, air marshal
- Tram Anh as Nhan, flight attendant
- Tran Ngoc Van as Khanh, flight co-pilot
- Xuan Phuc as Phong, flight captain

=== Hijackers ===
- Thai Hoa as Long (leader of the hijackers on flight HVN-602)
- Vo Dien Gia Huy as Ti, Dan's younger brother and a member of the hijackers on flight HVN-602
- Ray Nguyen as Dan, Ti's older brother and a member of the hijackers on flight HVN-602
- Bao Dinh as Suu, Long's son and a member of the hijackers on flight HVN-602

=== HVN-137 crew ===
- Hieu Nguyen, captain
- Nguyen Sy Hau, first officer
- Chi Pham as Thuy, flight attendant
- Kieu Diem as Chi, flight attendant

== See also ==
- Vietnam Civil Aviation Flight 509
- Vietnam Civil Aviation Flight 501
- List of Vietnam Airlines accidents and incidents
