= Vietnam Civil Aviation Flight 509 =

1977 aircraft hijacking

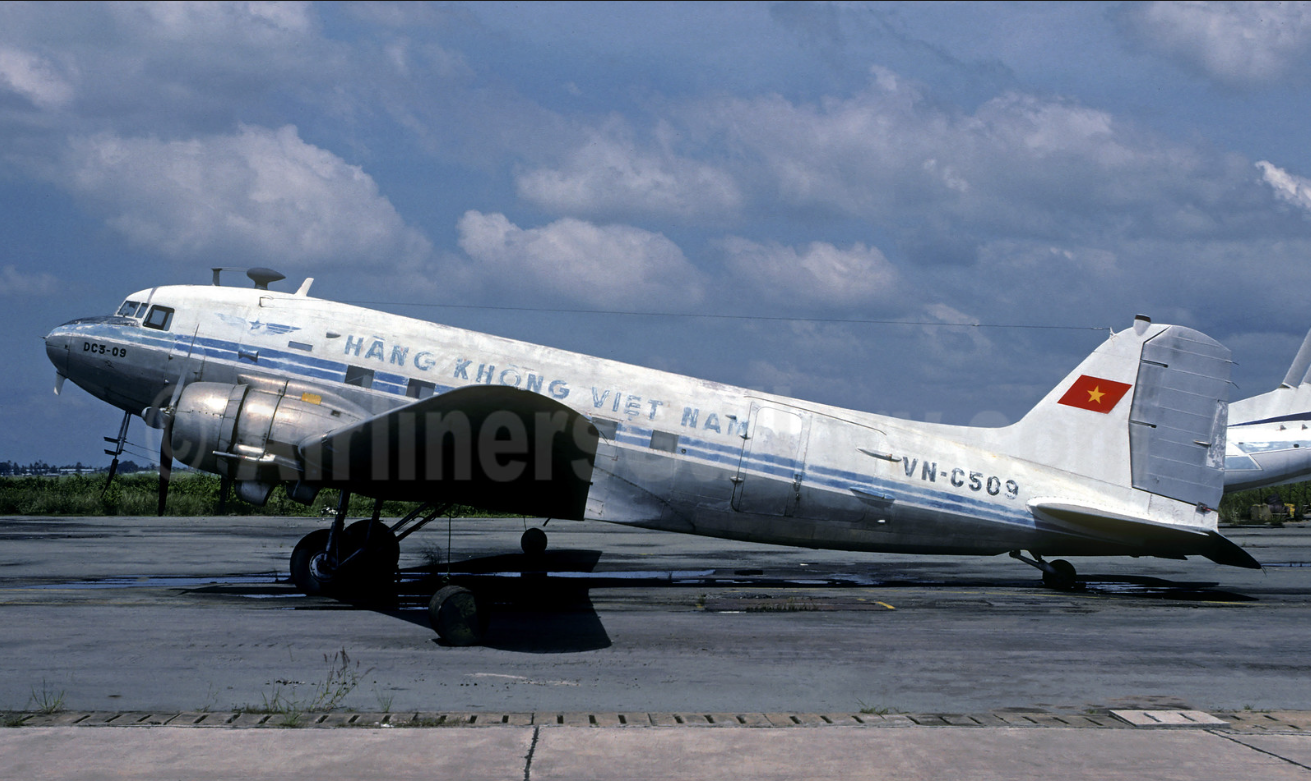
- VN-C509, the aircraft involved, photographed a day before the hijacking

Hijacking
- Date: 29 October 1977
- Summary: Hijacking
- Site: en route

Aircraft
- Aircraft type: Douglas C-47A
- Operator: Vietnam Civil Aviation (CAAV)
- Registration: VN-C509
- Flight origin: Tan Son Nhat International Airport, Ho Chi Minh City, Vietnam
- Destination: Duong Dong Airport, Phu Quoc, Kien Giang Province, Vietnam
- Occupants: 38
- Passengers: 32
- Crew: 6
- Fatalities: 2
- Injuries: 1
- Survivors: 34

On 29 October 1977, four armed Vietnamese hijackers seeking asylum in Singapore seized a Douglas DC-3, registration VN-C509, en route from Ho Chi Minh City to Phu Quoc Island with 32 passengers on board. The hijackers killed two of the six crew members and wounded a third before the aircraft was forced to land in Singapore. The pilot diverted to U-Tapao Air Base in Thailand for refueling. The flight continued to Singapore where it landed at 21:00 (GMT+07:30) at Seletar Air Base. The hijackers surrendered after negotiating with Singapore officials for five hours. Two days later, Vietnam sent an aircraft to Singapore to bring the DC-3, its crew, and the passengers back to the country.

This hijacking marks the first aircraft hijacking on a Vietnam Airlines's aircraft, and also the first aircraft hijacking after the Fall of Saigon in 1975. The aircraft involved in the incident is currently on display near the warehouse at Tan Son Nhat International Airport, next to a Vietnam Airlines's Tupolev Tu-134 with registration number VN-A132.

== Summary ==
A group of hijackers: Lam Van Tu, Tran Van Tu, Nguyen Minh Van and Tran Van Hai hijacked the flight approximately 15 minutes after it took off from Tan Son Nhat International Airport. The radio operator and the flight mechanic had been killed and a steward knifed and shot by the hijackers. The hijackers pointed guns at the captain and co-pilot, forcing them to fly to Singapore, but due to insufficient fuel, the crew requested to fly over U-Tapao Air Base (Thailand) to refuel before continuing on to Singapore.

After refueling, the plane took off for Singapore and requested permission to land at Changi Airport. The Singaporean government refused permission to land at Changi and demanded a landing at Seletar Airport at 17:35 (ex-UTC+07:30). After approximately 5 hours of negotiations, the hijackers surrendered in 21:00 (ex-UTC+07:30) their weapons and were granted political asylum. All passengers, crew, the aircraft involved in the incident, and the remains of the two deceased crew members were repatriated to Vietnam.

== In popular culture ==
The incident also inspired the film Hijacked by director Ham Tran, released in 2025. The plane itself which the incident occurred was also used as a setting for the movie.
