= The Housemaid (2016 film) =

- Cô Hầu Gái
- Directed by: Derek Nguyen
- Written by: Derek Nguyen
- Produced by: Timothy Linh Bui; Yuno Choi; Ha Quynh Vu; Nguyen The Phong
- Starring: Nhung Kate; Jean-Michel Richaud; Kim Xuan; Rosie Fellner; Phi Phung; Kien An
- Cinematography: Sam Chase
- Edited by: Stephane Gauger
- Music by: Jerome Leroy
- Production companies: HKFilm Vietnam; CJ E&M Film Division
- Release date: 16 September 2016
- Running time: 106 minutes
- Country: Vietnam
- Languages: Vietnamese; English

The Housemaid (Vietnamese: Cô Hầu Gái) is a 2016 Vietnamese gothic romance horror film directed by Derek Nguyen and starring Nhung Kate, Jean-Michel Richaud, Kim Xuan, and Rosie Fellner. Released in Vietnam on 16 September 2016, the film became the third-highest-grossing horror film in Vietnam's history and had its North American premiere at the 2017 Los Angeles Film Festival.

== Plot ==
Set in 1953 Vietnam during the First Indochinese War, the film tells the story of an orphaned country girl named Linh, who gets hired to be a housemaid at a haunted French rubber plantation. She unexpectedly falls in love with the French landowner Captain Sebastien Laurent, and awakens the vengeful ghost of his dead wife, Camille... who is out for blood.

== Cast ==
- Nhung Kate as Linh
- Jean-Michel Richaud as Captain Sebastien Laurent
- Kim Xuan as Mrs. Han
- Phi Phung as Mrs. Ngo
- Kien An as Mr. Chau
- Svitlana Kovalenko as Madame Camille
- Rosie Fellner as Madeleine
- Lan Phuong as Linh's mother
- Linh Son Nguyen as Bao

== Release ==
The film was released in Vietnam on 16 September 2016. Since then, the film has sold to 18 different territories including Australia (JBG Pictures), Turkey (Medyavizyon), Peru (Delta Films), Malaysia (Suraya Filem), and the UK (Eureka Entertainment). IFC Films released the film theatrically and on video on demand on 16 February 2018 in North America via their horror label IFC Midnight.

== Reception ==
=== Critical reception ===
The review aggregator website Rotten Tomatoes reported that 69% of critics have given the film a positive review based on 13 reviews, with an average rating of 5.79/10. On Metacritic, the film has a weighted average score of 61 out of 100 based on 4 critics, indicating "generally favorable reviews".

=== Awards ===
At the 2017 Los Angeles Film Festival, Nhung Kate received a Special Jury Prize for Acting for her portrayal of Linh.

The film was honored with the Silver Lotus Award (second prize) at the 2017 Vietnamese Film Festival and received awards for Best Score and Best Sound Design.

== Remake ==
CJ E&M Film Division is producing and financing an American remake of the film, with a screenplay to be written by Oscar-winning screenwriter Geoffrey S. Fletcher. Fletcher plans to relocate the setting from colonial Vietnam during the First Indochina War to the American South during the Reconstruction era but otherwise preserve the general plot structure.
