= Three Seasons =

- American theatrical release poster
- Directed by: Tony Bui
- Written by: Tony Bui; Timothy Linh Bui
- Produced by: Tony Bui; Joana Vicente; Jason Kliot
- Starring: Don Duong; Nguyen Ngoc Hiep; Tran Manh Cuong; Zoe Bui; Nguyen Huu Duoc; Harvey Keitel
- Cinematography: Lisa Rinzler
- Edited by: Keith Reamer
- Music by: Richard Horowitz
- Distributed by: October Films
- Release date: April 30, 1999 (USA)
- Running time: 113 minutes (theatrical); 104 minutes (USA)
- Countries: Vietnam; United States
- Languages: English; Vietnamese
- Box office: $2,021,698

Three Seasons (Vietnamese title: Ba Mùa) is a 1999 film, shot in Vietnam, about the past, present, and future of Ho Chi Minh City in the early days of Doi Moi. It is a poetic film that tries to paint a picture of the urban culture undergoing westernization. The movie takes place in Ho Chi Minh City, formerly Saigon. As the characters try to come to terms with the invasion of capitalism, neon signs, grand five-star hotels, and Coca-Cola signs, their paths begin to merge.

This was the first American film to be made in Vietnam after Bill Clinton lifted the embargo. The filmmakers were followed by Vietnamese inspectors throughout filming.

== Plot ==
In the misty mornings of Saigon, young girls wake up to pick lotuses from a flower pond, to later sell to American tourists and fellow Vietnamese alike. To pass the time, the girls sing rich folk songs that touch the heart of a poet (Teacher Dao) who lives in an old temple overlooking the pond. Teacher Dao suffered leprosy at the age of 26 and had consequently lost his fingers.

The girls (one of them a newcomer named Kien An) are trucked off to the bustling streets of Saigon where they sell the lotus in bundles for 5,000 đồng VND (roughly 30 cents USD). In Saigon, we meet different aspects of its inhabitants. Woody is a 9- to 10-year-old street peddler who sells cigarettes, chewing gum, and various other things in a box that hangs on a strap to his shoulder. Hai is a cyclo driver who hangs out with his buddies near a grand hotel.

Through a chance meeting, Hai eventually falls in love with Lan who works as a prostitute in big hotels. Though seemingly happy after receiving American dollars from her clients, she carries a silent resentment of herself and her clients. She tells Hai that she won't be doing this job for long and dreams of sleeping in an air-conditioned room, with no one to bother her. Lan tries to embrace the capitalist invasion by re-inventing herself and though she resents the lifestyle, she promises to one day live like them. Hai respects her and sees through her pain. After winning US$200 in a cyclo race, he treats her to her dream. Lan feels guilty and rejects Hai's advances. She feels that she is incapable and doesn't deserve Hai's special treatment. During one of the last scenes of the film, Lan finally comes to terms with herself and Hai as he takes her to a place streaming with red phượng vĩ (Royal Poinciana) blossoms. Lan, dressed in a beautiful white áo dài (traditional Vietnamese dress), marvels at her surroundings.

Hai's encounter with Kien An is a ridicule of the western embrace of "convenience". Kien An's flowers, hand-picked and real, are being driven out by mass-produced plastic flowers. Hai comments that they are even sprayed with perfume to imitate the smell. The only difference is that the plastic flowers never wilt and die. Hai wants no part in this and asks Kien An for two. Kien An respects him and gives him the lotus for free.

Kien An's tale involves various personal tragedies and how poetry can triumph and provide respite for the human soul. Teacher Dao is particularly interested in Kien An's song because it reminds him of his days as a small boy (when he was "light and pure") along the river markets. Teacher Dao also tells Kien An of a recurring dream. He dreams of being able to visit the river markets and drop white lotuses, letting them float downriver.

Kien An remarks that Teacher Dao's pain involves his inability to leave the seemingly abandoned temple. Teacher Dao corrects her and says that even though he never leaves the place, in spirit, he yearns for the songs of the birds, the scent of the lotus, and the freedom of the clouds that lazily float in the sky. In his prime, he was a successful poet. After losing his fingers to leprosy, Teacher Dao had given up hope of ever writing again. Kien An wants to help him and so she promises to lend him her fingers. From time to time, Kien An would visit his home in the temple to copy whatever the poet recites.

Soon, ill health as the result of old age and leprosy takes away the poet's life. Huy, Teacher Dao's headman, carries out one of his final wishes and gives Kien An Dao's poetry book, which contains a never-before seen picture of Dao. The two remarks that he was very handsome before being overtaken by leprosy. Kien An asks Huy for help to make the late Dao's dream come true. She visits the river market and drops lotus flowers, just like in Dao's dream.

James Hager is an American G.I. who returns to Vietnam to look for his daughter, in hope of "coming to peace with this place". Hai and his buddies jokingly say that Hager probably lost a few screws in his head. They witness him sitting in front of a hotel for weeks, smoking, staring at a restaurant across the street. They watch him with curiosity but never approach him. His story ends with him meeting his daughter. He gives her a bundle of lotus buds he has bought from Kien An and tries to talk with her.

Through these intertwining tales, director Tony Bui is able to portray the struggles of a vanishing culture. Kien An represents the country's old ways, living as if untouched by time. Lan represents the country's present, re-inventing herself and hoping to embrace the capitalist invasion. Hai (the cyclo driver) acts as a bridge between the past and the present, living care-free yet observing the "improvements" of westernization with a silent resentment. Woody, the young peddler, acts as the country's future, naïve, innocent, and easily fooled. Woody's story ends with him playing soccer with his friends in the rain.

== Cast ==
In order of appearance (major characters):

- Nguyen Ngoc Hiep as Kien An
- Hoang Phat Trieu as Huy, Teacher Dao's headman
- Don Duong as Hai
- Nguyen Huu Duoc as Woody
- Harvey Keitel as James Hager
- Zoe Bui as Lan
- Tran Manh Cuong as Teacher Dao

== Critical reception ==
The film was met with critical acclaim. The film has a score of 78% on Rotten Tomatoes based on 32 reviews.

Roger Ebert of the Chicago Sun-Times awarded the film three out of four and wrote: "We require Asia to be ancient, traditional and mysterious. It fills a need. We don't want to know that Hong Kong is a trade capital and Japan is an economic giant. We're looking for Shangri-La, for the sentimental fantasies of generations of Western writers who fell for the romantic idea of the East -- and centuries of Eastern writers who did, too. Three Seasons is so languorously beautiful, because it has the sentiment of a Chaplin film, because exotic customs and settings are so seductive, we change the rules. What is wrong in Chicago becomes colorful, even enchanting, in the former Saigon. Taken as a fable, it's enchanting. Art often offers us such bargains; it is better to attend La Boheme than to freeze in a garret."

== Accolades ==
- Berlin International Film Festival
  - Golden Bear (1999), nominated
- Golden Satellite Awards
  - Best Foreign Language Film (2000)
- Golden Trailer Awards
  - Best Foreign (1999)
- Independent Spirit Awards
  - Best Cinematography (2000)
  - Best First Feature (2000), nominated
- Political Film Society, USA
  - PFS Award (2000), nominated
- Portland International Film Festival
  - Best First Film (1999)
- Stockholm Film Festival
  - Bronze Horse (1999), nominated
- Sundance Film Festival
  - Grand Jury Prize (1999)
  - Audience Award (1999)
  - Cinematography Award (1999)

Three Seasons was the first in Sundance Film Festival history to ever receive both the Grand Jury Award and Audience Award.

== See also ==
- List of submissions to the 72nd Academy Awards for Best Foreign Language Film
- List of Vietnamese submissions for the Academy Award for Best Foreign Language Film

Awards
Preceded by Slam	Sundance Grand Jury Prize: U.S. Dramatic; 1999	Succeeded by Girlfight tied with You Can Count on Me
