= Annick Chartreux =

French composer (1942–2026)

- Born: Anne-Marie Chartreux; 26 November 1942; Nancy, German-occupied France
- Died: 13 June 2026 (aged 83)
- Education: Conservatoire Régional du Grand Nancy
- Occupation: Composer

Anne-Marie "Annick" Chartreux (French: [ˈan-maʁˈi "anˈik" ʃaʁtʁˈø]; 26 November 1942 – 13 June 2026) was a French composer.

After her studies at the Conservatoire Régional du Grand Nancy, she studied in Paris under Lucette Descaves, Alain Weber, and Marcel Bitsch. She then taught at the Lycée Claude-Monet until her retirement in 2004, teaching the likes of Krishna Levy, Laurent Naouri, the members of Mademoiselle K, and Anne Paceo.

Chartreux died on 13 June 2026, at the age of 83.

== Works ==
- In memoriam Erwin Schulhoff
- Trois mélodies sur des sonnets de Louise Labé
- Donnez-moi la mémoire
- Le Dit de l'ombre
- Triphase
- Poèmes pour l'amour et la mort
- Deux portraits - quatre tempéraments
- New Colours
- Aslanouko
- Z'arbres
- Fantaisie
