= We Were Soldiers =

2002 film directed by Randall Wallace

- Theatrical release poster
- Directed by: Randall Wallace
- Screenplay by: Randall Wallace
- Based on: We Were Soldiers Once...and Young by Hal Moore and Joseph L. Galloway
- Produced by: Bruce Davey; Stephen McEveety; Randall Wallace
- Starring: Mel Gibson; Madeleine Stowe; Greg Kinnear; Sam Elliott; Chris Klein; Keri Russell; Barry Pepper
- Cinematography: Dean Semler
- Edited by: William Hoy
- Music by: Nick Glennie-Smith
- Production companies: Icon Productions; Wheelhouse Entertainment
- Distributed by: Paramount Pictures (Note: Paramount Pictures distributed the film in the United States, while Icon Productions handled international distribution, parthering with Concorde Filmverleih in Germany, and BAC Films in France.)
- Release date: March 1, 2002
- Running time: 138 minutes
- Countries: United States; Germany; France
- Languages: English; Vietnamese; French
- Budget: $70–75 million
- Box office: $115.4 million

We Were Soldiers is a 2002 American war film co-produced, written and directed by Randall Wallace and starring Mel Gibson (both of whom previously worked together on Braveheart), Madeleine Stowe, Greg Kinnear, Sam Elliott, Chris Klein, Keri Russell, Barry Pepper, Ryan Hurst, Marc Blucas, Clark Gregg, and Jon Hamm. The film is based on the 1992 book We Were Soldiers Once… and Young by Lieutenant General (Ret.) Hal Moore and reporter Joseph L. Galloway, dramatizing the Battle of Ia Drang on November 14, 1965.

== Plot ==
In 1954, the French Far East Expeditionary Corps' 100th Mobile Group, on patrol during the First Indochina War, is ambushed by Viet Minh forces. Viet Minh commander Nguyen Huu An orders his soldiers to "kill all they send, and they will stop coming".

Eleven years later in 1965, the United States is fighting the Vietnam War. US Army Lieutenant Colonel Hal Moore is chosen to train and lead a battalion. After arriving in Vietnam, he learns that an American base has been attacked and is ordered to take his 400 men after the enemy and eliminate the North Vietnamese attackers; intelligence has no idea of the number of enemy troops. Moore leads a newly created air cavalry unit into the Ia Drang Valley. After landing, the soldiers capture a North Vietnamese scout and learn from him that the location they were sent to is the base camp for a veteran North Vietnamese army division of 4,000 men.

Upon arrival in the area with a platoon of soldiers, 2nd Lt. Henry Herrick spots another enemy scout and runs after him, ordering his reluctant soldiers to follow. The scout lures them into an ambush, which results in several men being killed, including Herrick and his subordinates. The surviving platoon members are surrounded and cut off from the rest of the battalion. Sgt. Savage assumes command, calls in the artillery, and uses the cover of night to keep the Vietnamese from overrunning their defensive position.

Meanwhile, with helicopters constantly dropping off units, Moore manages to secure weak points before the North Vietnamese can take advantage of them. Despite being trapped and desperately outnumbered, the main US force manages to hold off the North Vietnamese with artillery, mortars, and helicopter airlifts of supplies and reinforcements. Eventually, Nguyen Huu An, the commander of the North Vietnamese division, orders a large-scale attack on the American position.

Back in the United States, Julia Moore has become the leader of the American wives who live on the base. When the Army begins using taxi drivers to deliver telegrams that notify the next of kin of the soldiers' deaths, Julia takes over that responsibility.

At the point of being overrun by the enemy, Moore orders 1st Lt. Charlie Hastings, his forward air controller, to call in "Broken Arrow", a call for all available combat aircraft to attack enemy positions, even those close to the US troops' position, because they are being overrun. The aircraft attacked with bombs, napalm, and machine guns, killing many People's Army of Vietnam and Viet Cong troops, but a friendly fire incident also results in American deaths. The North Vietnamese attack is repelled, and the surviving soldiers of Herrick's cut-off platoon, including Savage, are rescued.

Moore's troops regroup and secure the area. Nguyen Huu An plans a final assault on the Americans and sends most of his forces to carry out the attack, but Moore and his men overrun them and approach the enemy command center. Before the base camp guards can open fire, Major Bruce "Snake" Crandall and other helicopter gunships attack and destroy the remnant of the enemy force. With no more troops to call on, Huu An quickly orders the headquarters evacuated.

Having achieved his objective, Moore returns to the helicopter landing zone to be picked up. Only after everyone (including the dead and wounded) is removed from the battlefield does he fly out of the valley. Sometime later, Nguyen Huu An and his men arrive on the battlefield to collect their dead. He claims that the Americans will "think this was their victory. So this will become an American war".

At the end of the film, it is revealed that the landing zone immediately reverted to North Vietnamese hands after the American troops were airlifted out. Hal Moore continued the battle in a different landing zone, and after nearly a year, he returned home safely to Julia and his family. His superiors congratulate him for killing over 1,800 North Vietnamese Army and Viet Cong soldiers. An older, now retired Moore visits the Vietnam War memorial and looks at the names of the soldiers who fell at Ia Drang.

== Cast ==
- Mel Gibson as Lt. Col. Hal Moore
- Madeleine Stowe as Julia Moore
- Greg Kinnear as Major Bruce Crandall
- Sam Elliott as Sgt. Maj. Basil Plumley
- Chris Klein as 2nd Lt. Jack Geoghegan
- Keri Russell as Barbara Geoghegan
- Barry Pepper as Joe Galloway
- Đơn Dương as Lt. Col. Nguyễn Hữu An
- Ryan Hurst as Sgt. Ernie Savage
- Robert Bagnell as 1st Lt. Charlie Hastings
- Marc Blucas as 2nd Lt. Henry Herrick
- Josh Daugherty as Spec. 4 Bob Ouellette
- Jsu Garcia as Capt. Tony Nadal
- Clark Gregg as Capt. Tom Metsker
- Jon Hamm as Capt. Matt Dillon
- Blake Heron as Spec. 4 Galen Bungum
- Erik MacArthur as Spec. 4 Russell Adams
- Desmond Harrington as Spec. 4 Bill Beck
- Dylan Walsh as Capt. Robert (Bob) Edwards
- Mark McCracken as Ed "Too Tall" Freeman
- Brian Tee as Pfc. Jimmy Nakayama
- Johnny Tri Nguyen as Young NVA Lieutenant

== Adaptation from source material ==
In the source book, We Were Soldiers Once… and Young, Hal Moore complains, "Every damn Hollywood movie got [the Vietnam war] wrong." The director, Randall Wallace, said that he was inspired by that comment and became "determined to get it right this time."

The film's final version got many of the facts of the book presented onto film but is not entirely a historically accurate portrayal of the battle or entirely faithful to the book. For instance, the film depicts a heroic charge under the command of Lt. Col. Hal Moore at the end of the battle that destroys the Vietnamese reserve, ending the battle in an American victory (a fact that the director noted in his commentary). In fact, there was no heroic final charge in the book, and the North Vietnamese forces were not destroyed, although Moore did report 834 enemy bodies and 1,215 estimated killed in action (one-third of the enemy force). The US forces were reduced by 72 out of 395, with 18% fatal casualties. The Vietnamese commander, Lt. Col. Nguyen Huu An, did not see the conclusion at Landing Zone X-Ray as the end of combat, and the battle continued the next day with combat action at Landing Zone Albany, where the 2/7th, with A Company 1/5th, found themselves in a fight for their lives against Lt. Col. Nguyen Huu An's reserve.

Despite the differences from the book and departures from historical accuracy, Moore stated in a documentary, included in the video versions, that the film was the first one "to get [the war] right."

== Reception ==
=== Box office ===
We Were Soldiers grossed $78.1 million in the United States and Canada, and $37.3 million in other territories, for a worldwide total of $115.4 million, against a budget of $70–75 million.

=== Critical response ===
On the review aggregator website Rotten Tomatoes, 63% of 145 critics' reviews are positive, with an average rating of 6.4/10. The website's consensus reads: "The war cliches are laid on a bit thick, but the movie succeeds at putting a human face on soldiers of both sides in the Vietnam War." Metacritic, which uses a weighted average, assigned the film a score of 65 out of 100, based on 37 critics, indicating "generally favorable" reviews. Audiences polled by CinemaScore gave the film an average grade of "A" on an A+ to F scale.

Roger Ebert, writing for the Chicago Sun-Times, gave We Were Soldiers 3.5 stars out of 4, and praised its truthful and realistic battle scenes and how it follows the characters: "Black Hawk Down was criticized because the characters seemed hard to tell apart. We Were Soldiers doesn't have that problem; in the Hollywood tradition it identifies a few key players, casts them with stars, and follows their stories." Lisa Schwarzbaum, from Entertainment Weekly, gave the film a B and noted its fair treatment of both sides: "The writer-director bestows honor – generously, apolitically – not only on the dead and still living American veterans who fought in Ia Drang, but also on their families, on their Vietnamese adversaries, and on the families of their adversaries too. Rarely has a foe been portrayed with such measured respect for a separate reality, which should come as a relief to critics (I'm one) of the enemy's facelessness in Black Hawk Down; vignettes of gallantry among Vietnamese soldiers and such humanizing visual details as a Vietnamese sweetheart's photograph left behind, in no way interfere with the primary, rousing saga of a fine American leader who kept his promise to his men to 'leave no one behind dead or alive.'"

David Sterritt, from the Christian Science Monitor, criticized the film for giving a more positive image of the Vietnam War that, in his opinion, did not concur with reality: "The films about Vietnam that most Americans remember are positively soaked in physical and emotional torment – from Platoon, with its grunt's-eye view of combat, to Apocalypse Now, with its exploration of war's dehumanizing insanity. Today, the pendulum has swung back again. If filmmakers with politically twisted knives once sliced away guts-and-glory clichés, their current equivalents hack away all meaningful concern with moral and political questions. We Were Soldiers is shameless in this regard, filling the screen with square-jawed officers who weep at the carnage and fresh-faced GIs who use their last breaths to intone things like, 'I'm glad I died for my country.'"

Todd McCarthy, from Variety, wrote the film "presents the fighting realistically, violently and relatively coherently given the chaotic circumstances..." McCarthy further wrote, "Mel Gibson has the closest thing to a John Wayne part that anyone's played since the Duke himself rode into the sunset, and he plays it damn well." He summarized, "Gibson's performance anchors the film with commanding star power to burn. This officer truly loves his men, and the credibility with which the actor can express Moore's leadership qualities, as well as his sensitive side, is genuinely impressive."

=== Involved combatants' response ===
Hal Moore, who had long been critical of many Vietnam War films for their negative portrayals of American servicemen, publicly expressed approval of the film and is featured in segments of the DVD.

Retired Colonel Rick Rescorla, a central figure in the book, was disappointed – after reading the script – to learn that he and his unit had been left out of the film.

== Works cited ==
- Fitzgerald, John J. (2004). "The Battle of the Ia Drang Valley: A Comparative Analysis of Generals, the Media, and the Soldiers". OAH Magazine of History. 18 (5): 37–43. doi:10.1093/maghis/18.5.37. JSTOR 25163721.
- Wetta, Frank J.; Novelli, Martin A. (2003). ""Now a Major Motion Picture": War Films and Hollywood's New Patriotism". The Journal of Military History. 67 (3): 861–882. doi:10.1353/jmh.2003.0263. JSTOR 3397330. S2CID 159476108.
- Doherty, Thomas (2002). "THE NEW WAR MOVIES AS MORAL REARMAMENT: Black Hawk Down & We Were Soldiers". Cinéaste. 27 (3): 4–8. JSTOR 41690152.
- Gwin, Larry (1999). Baptism -- A Vietnam Memoir., Gwin was Exec Officer, Alpha Company, 2nd Battalion, 7th Cavalry at Ia Drang.
