= Timothy Linh Bui =

American film director

- Born: Saigon, South Vietnam
- Occupations: Director, producer, screenwriter
- Notable work: Green Dragon (1999); Three Seasons (2002); Powder Blue (2009); The Housemaid (2016)

Timothy Linh Bui (b. Saigon, South Vietnam, April 13, 1970) is a Vietnamese-born American filmmaker, film producer, and screenwriter. He directed Green Dragon, and co-wrote and produced Three Seasons.

== Early life ==
Bui was born in Saigon, South Vietnam, and came to the United States with his family as a refugee of the Vietnam War in 1975, leaving Vietnam approximately one week before the Fall of Saigon. He grew up in Sunnyvale, California, in the San Francisco Bay Area. His parents owned a video store where he stated that he watched "thousands" of movies and shot amateur action short films in his parents' backyard.

Bui initially moved to Los Angeles to study in business school, but quickly dropped out to join a film school. He is a graduate of Los Angeles film school, Columbia College Hollywood (CCH).

Timothy Linh Bui is the older brother of Tony Bui, who is also a film director and producer. Bui is also the nephew of the Vietnamese actor Đơn Dương.

== Career ==
In 1999, Tim Bui co-wrote the film Three Seasons with his brother, the first US-funded production about Vietnam that portrayed "the beauty of the country" instead of the "ugliness" of the war horrors of the 1970s. This trip to Vietnam revived his interest for his family's country.

In 2001, he released Green Dragon, which took place in the Vietnamese internment camps in Pendleton, California in 1975.

Patrick Swayze's last film appearance was in Tim Bui's 2009 film Powder Blue.

In 2016, Bui and Ahn Tran launched Happy Canvas Film in Ho Chi Minh City in Vietnam with the intent to develop the film industry in the country. The studio worked on the production of a Vietnamese version of the TV show The Bachelor.

In 2018, Bui was part of the production team behind the American remake of his 2016 film The Housemaid.

== Filmography ==
Year	Film	Credited as				
Year	Film	Director	Producer	Writer	Actor	Role
1995	Yellow Lotus		Yes			
1995	Duong tinh yeu	Yes				
1998	The Love Boat: The Next Wave				Yes	First Mate
1999	Three Seasons		Yes	Yes		
2001	Green Dragon	Yes		Yes		
2005	Inside Out		Yes			
2005	My Name Is...		Yes			
2007	Owl and the Sparrow		Yes			
2009	Shooting Blue		Yes			
2009	Powder Blue	Yes	Yes	Yes		
2013	How To Fight in Six Inch Heels		Yes			
2015	The Throwaways		Yes			
2016	The Housemaid		Yes			
2018	The Bachelor: Vietnam		Yes			
TBA	Live Fast, Die Laughing	Yes				

== Awards ==
- 2001: Best Advance Screening for Green Dragon at the Austin Film Festival
- 2001: Best Film for Green Dragon at the Humanitas Prize
- 1999: Grand Jury Prize, Audience Award, Cinematography for Three Season at the Sundance Film Festival
- 2001: Grand Jury Prize for Best Dramatic Film for Green Dragon at the Sundance Film Festival
- 2014: Silver Kite Award Best Feature Film for How To Fight in Six Inch Heels (Am Muu Giay Got Nhon) at the Vietnam Awards
- 2016: Highest Grossing Vietnamese Horror Film for The Housemaid at the Vietnam Awards
- 2017: Silver Lotus Award Best Feature Film for The Housemaid (Co Hau Gai) at the Golden Lotus Film Festival

== See also ==
- Cinema of Vietnam
