= Jérôme Leroy (composer) =

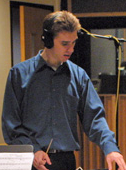

Background information
- Born: September 2, 1981 (age 43); Paris, France
- Genres: Classical, film music
- Occupation(s): Composer, orchestrator
- Years active: 1995–present

Jérôme Leroy is a French composer and orchestrator based in Los Angeles.

== Early life and family ==
Born in Paris, Leroy was first introduced to music as a young child playing the piano. He started serious study and practice at the age of five and at the age of fourteen he turned to composition.

Leroy attended high school at Lycée Claude Monet, where he studied under composer Annick Chartreux and performed in numerous concerts as a pianist and singer.

After having written various chamber pieces in his teens (his minimalist duology, 2017, was premiered at the Conservatoire Municipal de Paris Maurice Ravel and at Lycée Claude Monet in 1999), he applied in 2001 for the Berklee College of Music in Boston, for which he was awarded a scholarship.

== Berklee College of Music ==
At Berklee, where Leroy studied Film Scoring, he founded the school's first student-run classical orchestra, which produced its first recording in April 2004 and a string of concerts in the following years.

While in Boston, he also joined a community theater company, the Longwood Players. In the spring of 2004, he was Orchestra Manager and Arranger on their production of Stephen Sondheim's Company, and was appointed conductor in Spring 2005 on their production of La Cage aux Folles.

== First Steps in Hollywood ==
After graduating from Berklee College of Music in the Spring of 2005, Leroy moved to Los Angeles to pursue a career in the film and TV industry, where he first started working as a technician and assistant for various composers. This led him to meet John Frizzell, who eventually gave him his first orchestration opportunity on a TV film (A Little Thing Called Murder), and a few weeks later on a feature film (Stay Alive).

In April 2006, Leroy started working for composer and orchestrator William Ross. Around the same period, he also re-orchestrated a suite from Basil Poledouris's score to Conan The Barbarian, to be performed under the composer's direction in July 2006, at the second International Film Music Conference in Úbeda, Spain. Leroy also worked as orchestrator and assistant to Ross on the 79th Academy Awards ceremony.

In 2008, he orchestrated on Ross' score to The Tale of Despereaux and later on worked on an additional two Emmy-winning Academy Awards ceremonies. Through his associations with Ross, Leroy wrote additional music on A Very Harold & Kumar 3D Christmas, Touchback, and numerous Hallmark Hall of Fame's movies-of-the-week, such as Away & Back (starring Minka Kelly) and In My Dreams (starring Katharine McPhee). In 2012, he also was music programmer on Lionsgate's tentpole blockbuster The Hunger Games.

== Momentum, RLP ==
In 2011, Ross and Leroy partnered to form the company Momentum RLP, a music production studio based in Santa Monica, California.

== Works ==
Since 2011, Leroy has written original music for short films, independent features (The Mistover Tale, iKllr, The Housemaid, Chị chị em em...) and television films (Crackle's The Throwaways, Hallmark Channel's One Christmas Eve...).

Leroy has also been writing music to video games such as Bandai Namco's Jump Force and for music libraries such as Audio Network.
