= Ham Tran =

Vietnamese-American filmmaker

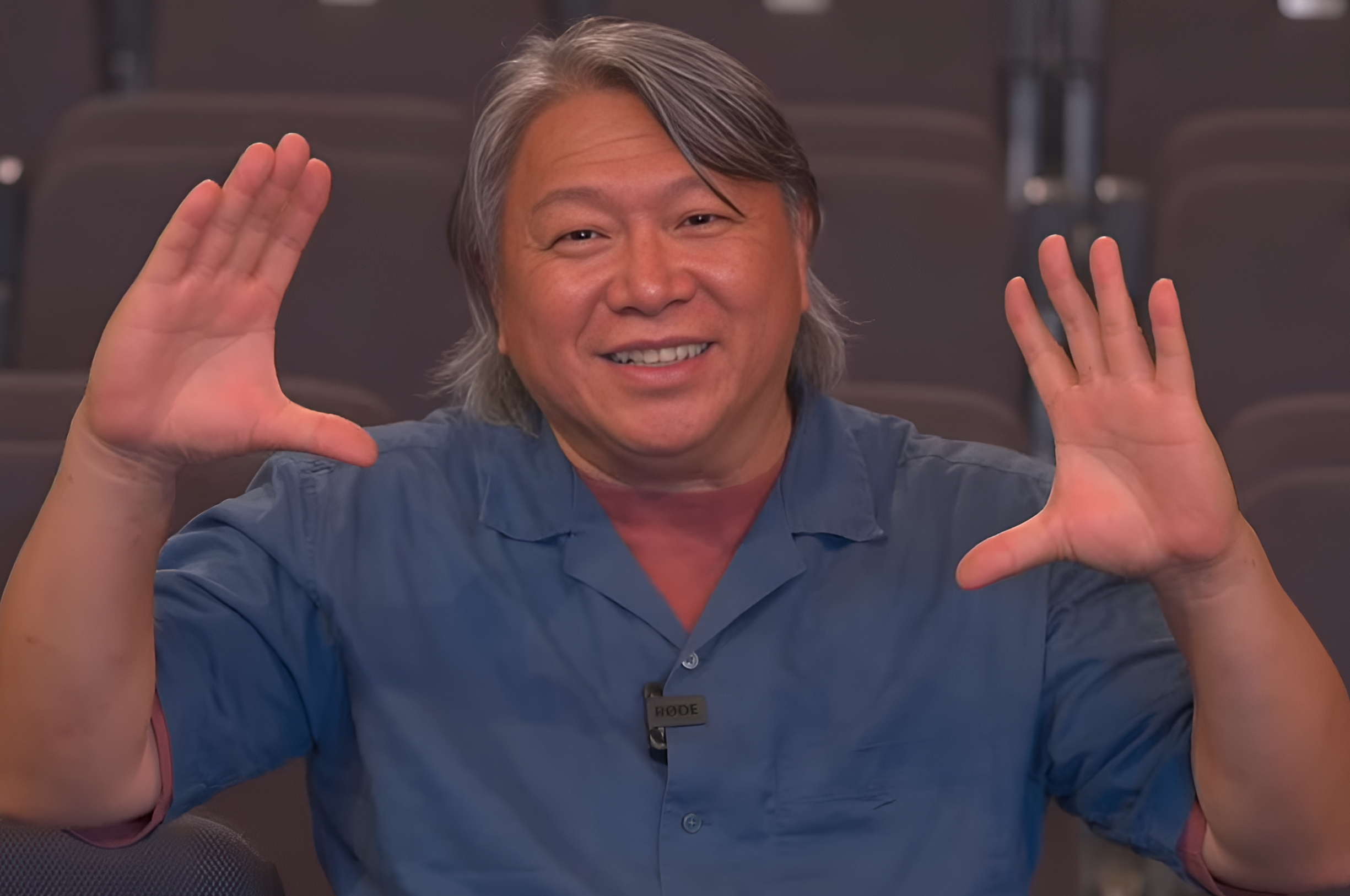
Hàm Trần in 2025

Ham Tran (Vietnamese: Trần Hàm) is a Vietnamese American filmmaker. He is of Hoa (Chinese Vietnamese) ancestry, specifically Teochew.

He earned an MFA in film directing from the UCLA Film School and is most famous for his thesis film The Anniversary, which was shortlisted for the Academy Award for Live Action Short Film.

His most recent effort is the feature film How to Fight in Six Inch Heels which had its U.S. premiere on 13 March 2014 at CAAMFest in San Francisco. Tran also directed the full-length Vietnamese boat people and re-education camp drama, Journey From the Fall, which was picked up in North America by ImaginAsian Pictures and released nationally on March 23, 2007.

In 2009, Tran received the Vilcek Prize for Creative Promise in Filmmaking.

== Filmography ==
=== Director ===
- The Prescription (short film)
- Pomegranate (short film)
- 2004 - The Anniversary
- 2006 - Journey From the Fall
- 2013 - How to Fight in Six Inch Heels
- 2014 - Hollow
- 2016 - Bitcoin Heist
- 2017 - She's the Boss
- 2022 - Maika: The Girl From Another Galaxy
- 2024 - Missing Eve Of Tet
- 2025 - Hijacked

=== Executive producer ===
- 2007 - Owl and the Sparrow

=== Cinematographer and editor ===
- 2007 - Oh, Saigon
- 2007 - The Rebel
