= Nà Sản Airport =

Nà Sản Airport Sân Bay Nà Sản
- IATA: SQH; ICAO: VVNS

Summary
- Airport type: Public
- Operator: Northern Airports Services Company
- Serves: Sơn La
- Location: Mai Sơn, Sơn La Province, Vietnam
- Elevation AMSL: 669 m (2,195 ft)
- Coordinates: 21°12′53″N 104°02′07″E

Map
- Location of the airport in Vietnam

Runways
Direction	Length		Surface
Direction	m	ft	Surface
12/30	2,409	7,904	Paved
- Sources: GCM, STV

The Nà Sản Airport (IATA: SQH, ICAO: VVNS) (Vietnamese: Sân Bay Nà Sản) is an airport in Mai Sơn District, Sơn La Province, Vietnam. Currently, there are no scheduled services to Nà Sản.

== History ==
=== First Indochina War (1946 – 1954) ===
Nà Sản Airport was built in 1950 by the French as part of their army outpost in Nà Sản. Initially, the airport had a short clay airstrip but it was then extended and paved with pierced steel planking to be able to handle larger planes like the Douglas DC-3. In October 1952, the outpost was fortified to create a hedgehog defense against the Viet Minh forces in what was to become the Battle of Nà Sản. After the battle ended in December 1952, the French retained control of the region. In August 1953, French forces withdrew from the outpost and Nà Sản Airport was abandoned afterward.

=== After First Indochina War (1954 – present) ===
Under the Democratic Republic of Vietnam authority, the airport resumed operations in 1958 when Vietnam Civil Aviation started flying from Hanoi–Gia Lâm to Nà Sản and Điện Biên by Antonov An-2. After the Reunification of Vietnam, the airport opened from 1994 until May 2004 when it was closed for "upgrades and maintenance". Since then, the airport has been disused.

== Usage ==
There are currently no scheduled services to Nà Sản as the airport is closed. In January 2015, an upgrade was proposed for the airport. According to the modified plan for 2020 with vision to 2030, the airport would become a mixed-use domestic airport capable of handling 900,000 passengers a year by 2020 and 1.5 million by 2030, its single runway would be extended to 2,600 m (8,500 ft). However, Nà Sản Airport was dropped from the modified planning of Vietnam's air transport development released in February 2018. This leaves Điện Biên Phủ Airport, 110 km (68 mi) west of Nà Sản, the sole airport of Vietnam's Northwest region while Nà Sản Airport's future remains unclear.

In February 2021, Son La Province People's Committee submitted a request to the Ministry of Transport to add Nà Sản Airport to the priority investment list from 2021 to 2030, stated the airport has "significant strategic importance to national defense". Its sister airport in the Northwest Region, Điện Biên Phủ Airport has a very short runway and sits in the middle of a basin, which leads to the inability to lengthen the runway, which rendered the airport unable to accommodate large aircraft, both commercial (such as the A320 and similar) and military (fighter jets such as the Su-22 and the Su-30MK2V) and transport aircraft (such as the C-295). In August 2022, the Son La Province People's Committee officially submitted the proposal to the prime minister and the Vietnamese government for review.

== See also ==
- List of airports in Vietnam
