= Dien Bien Airport =

Airport in Vietnam

Dien Bien Airport Sân bay Điện Biên
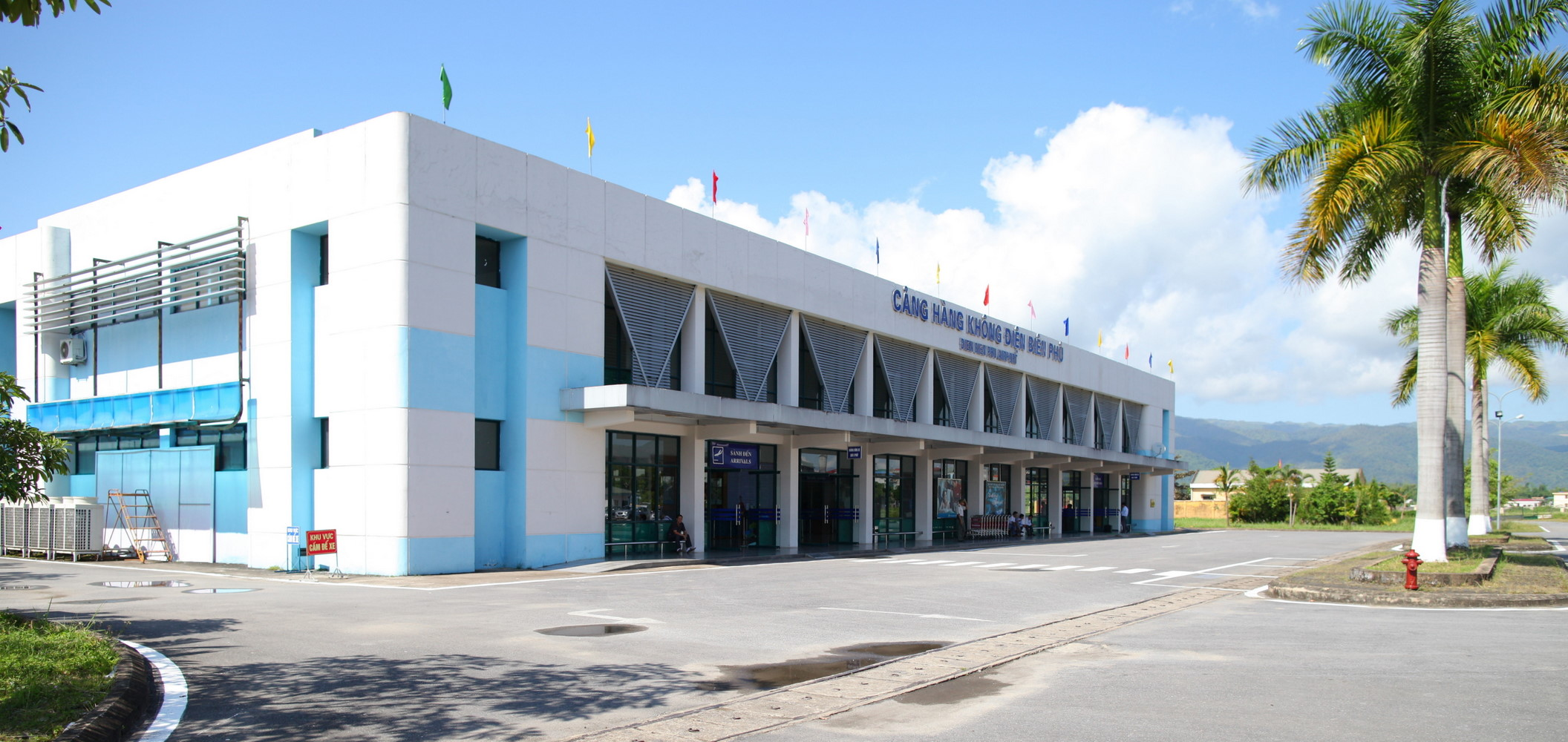
- Dien Bien Phu Airport old terminal
- IATA: DIN; ICAO: VVDB

Summary
- Airport type: Public
- Operator: Airports Corporation of Vietnam
- Location: Điện Biên Phủ, Điện Biên, Vietnam
- Elevation AMSL: 483 m / 1,585 ft
- Coordinates: 21°23′50″N 103°00′28″E
- Website: www.vietnamairport.vn/dienbienairport

Map
- Location of airport in Vietnam

Runways
Direction	Length		Surface
Direction	m	ft	Surface
17/35	2,400	7,874	Concrete

Dien Bien Airport (IATA: DIN, ICAO: VVDB) is located at Điện Biên Phủ in Vietnam.

== History ==
Điện Biên Phủ Airport was established in 1954 as Mường Thanh Airfield. The main purpose of it is to serve the French HQ in Điện Biên Phủ at the time of the First Indochina War.

4 years after the French left Điện Biên Phủ, in 1958, commercial flights to the airport started, operated by the Air Force, but only for a while due to the low demand at the time. In 1984, along with the 30th Anniversary of the Battle of Dien Bien Phu, flights from Hanoi to Điện Biên Phủ resumed, operated by the Antonov An-24. 10 months later, in January 30, 1995, this route is once again suspended because of the runway needed to be repaired. After the repair, flight resumed, this time being operated by the ATR 72. In 2004, the airport's apron is extended to 12000 square meters, with 4 parking stands for ATR 72 aircraft.

== Facilities ==
Today, Điện Biên Phủ Airport is the largest and only commercial airport serving the city of Điện Biên Phủ in particular and the entire Northwest region of Vietnam, after the closure of Nà Sản Airport in 2004. It is located in the middle of a basin at an altitude of 1.611 meters above sea level. The apron and taxiway is 7500 square meters wide, with 4 parking stands for aircraft. The terminal is 2500 square meters wide and is capable of serving 4 flights per day. In 2023, the airport was upgraded with a new 2,400 metres (7,900 ft) × 45 metres (148 ft) runway and associated facilities to make it compatible with bigger-sized narrow-body airliners such as the Airbus A320/A321 and Boeing 737.

== Expansion ==
Dien Bien province People's Committee has approved the temporary closure of the airport following an expansion proposal by the Civil Aviation Authority of Vietnam. The closure will start from 1 April 2023 and lasts 6 months. The expansion includes building a new security fences, upgrading terminal's facilities and the lengthening and widening of the runway.

The new runway would be 2400 m (7874 ft) long and 45 m wide, enabling the airport to accommodate A320/A321 or equivalent aircraft. The terminal will be upgraded to receive up to 500 thousand passengers per year. On 30 November 2023, the expansion project was completed and the airport resumed all operations on 2 December.

The project cost is estimated to be around VND 1.467 trillion (US$ 62 million), all paid for by ACV.

== Airlines and destinations ==
Airlines	Destinations
Vietnam Airlines	Hanoi

== Gallery ==
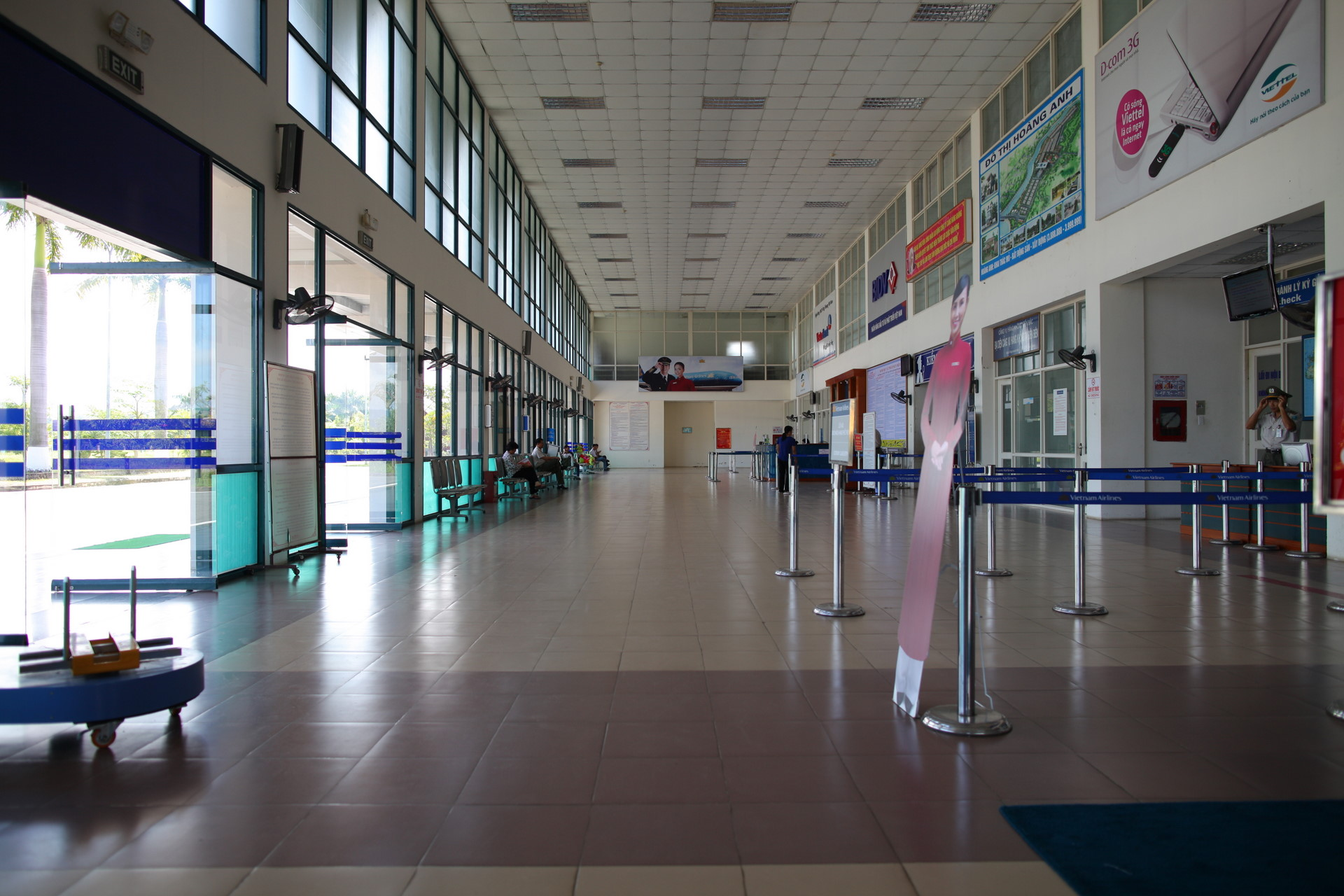

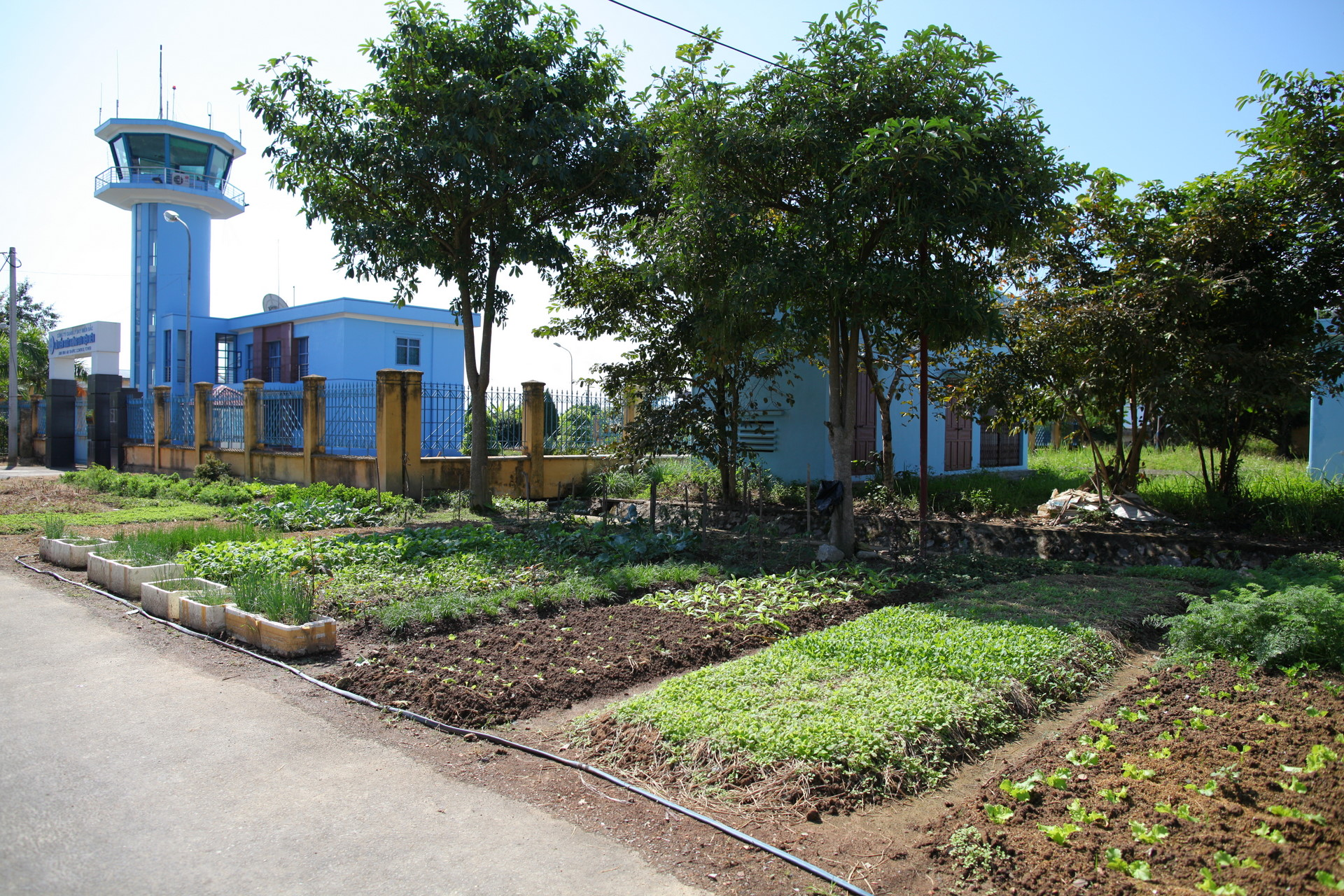

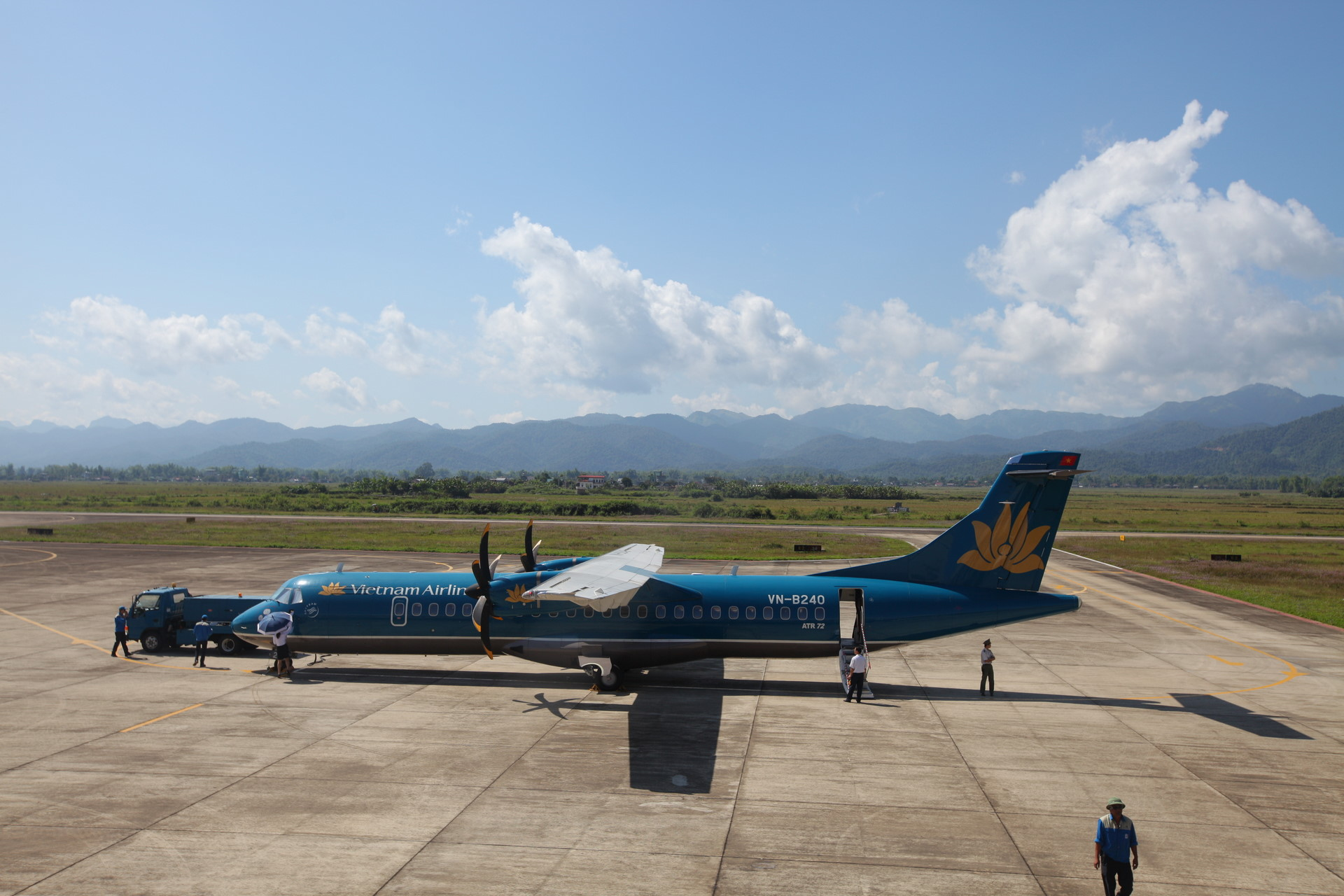

== See also ==
- List of airports in Vietnam
