= Vietnam Airlines =

National airline of Vietnam

Vietnam Airlines Hãng hàng không Quốc gia Việt Nam

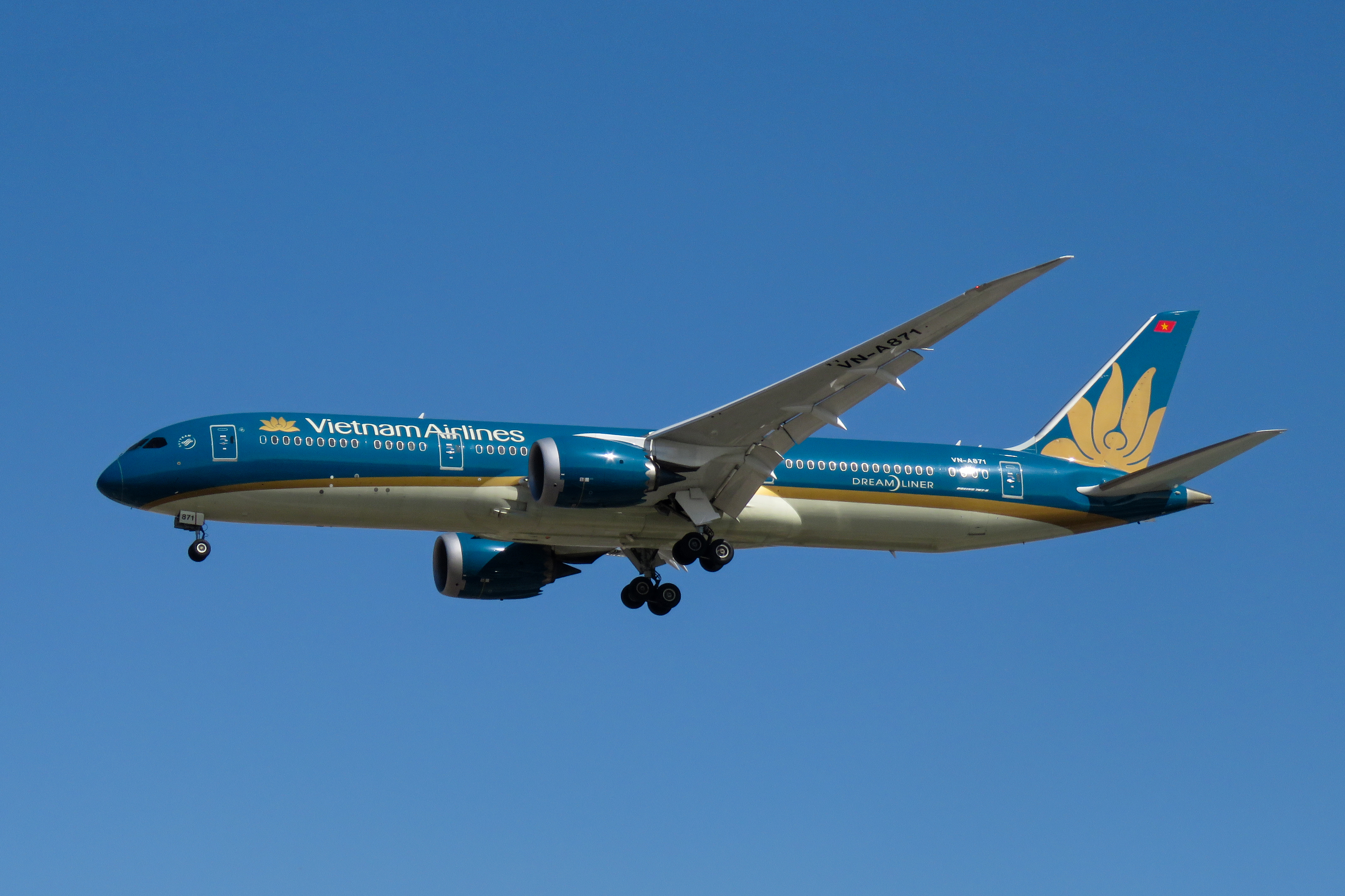
- Vietnam Airlines Boeing 787-9
IATA	ICAO	Call sign
VN	HVN	VIET NAM AIRLINES
- Founded: 15 January 1956; 70 years ago (as Vietnam Civil Aviation)
- Hubs: Hanoi; Ho Chi Minh City
- Secondary hubs: Da Nang
- Focus cities: Phnom Penh; Siem Reap
- Frequent-flyer program: Lotusmiles
- Alliance: SkyTeam; SkyTeam Cargo
- Subsidiaries: Pacific Airlines; Vietnam Air Services Company; Vietnam Airlines Caterers; Vietnam Airlines Cargo; Vietnam Airlines Engineering Company
- Fleet size: 97
- Destinations: 65
- Parent company: Vietnam Airlines JSC
- Headquarters: 200 Nguyễn Sơn, Bồ Đề ward, Long Biên district, Hanoi, Vietnam
- Key people: Lê Hồng Hà (President & CEO) Đặng Ngọc Hoà (Chairman)
- Revenue: ▲VND121,429 billion (2025)
- Profit: ▲VND7,713 billion (2025)
- Employees: 5,222 (2024)
- Website: www.vietnamairlines.com

Vietnam Airlines (Vietnamese: Hãng hàng không Quốc gia Việt Nam, lit. 'Vietnam National Airlines') is the flag carrier of Vietnam. The airline was founded in 1956 and later established as a state-owned enterprise in April 1989. Vietnam Airlines is headquartered in Long Biên district, Hanoi, with hubs at Noi Bai International Airport in Hanoi and Tan Son Nhat International Airport in Ho Chi Minh City. The airline flies 117 routes across 19 countries, excluding codeshared services.

From its inception until the early 1990s, Vietnam Airlines was a minor carrier within the aviation industry as it was hampered by a variety of factors including the socio-economic and political situation of the country. With the government's normalization of relations with the United States, the airline could expand, improve its products and services, and modernize its ageing fleet. In 1996, the Vietnamese government brought together 20 service companies to form Vietnam Airlines Corporation, with the airline itself as the centrepiece. In 2010, the corporation was restructured into a limited liability company and renamed Vietnam Airlines Company Limited. A seven-seat management board, appointed by the Vietnamese Prime Minister, oversees the company.

As passenger transport constitutes its core activity, Vietnam Airlines plays a crucial role in the economic development of the country. It owns 100% of Vietnam Air Service Company – a regional airline in southern Vietnam and almost 99% of the low-cost carrier Pacific Airlines. In addition, the corporation earns revenue from airline catering and the maintenance and overhauling of aircraft through a number of its subsidiaries, including Vietnam Airlines Engineering Company and Vietnam Airlines Caterers. The company has also diversified its investments in the aircraft-leasing and airport ground-servicing industries, and is looking to manufacture aircraft components. It controls and operates a cargo division, Vietnam Airlines Cargo.

Vietnam Airlines became a member of SkyTeam in June 2010, making it the first Southeast Asian carrier to have joined that alliance. As of September 2021, the State's stake in Vietnam Airlines is 86.34% and All Nippon Airways holds 5.62%, being a strategic shareholder of the national flag carrier.

== History ==
=== Beginnings ===
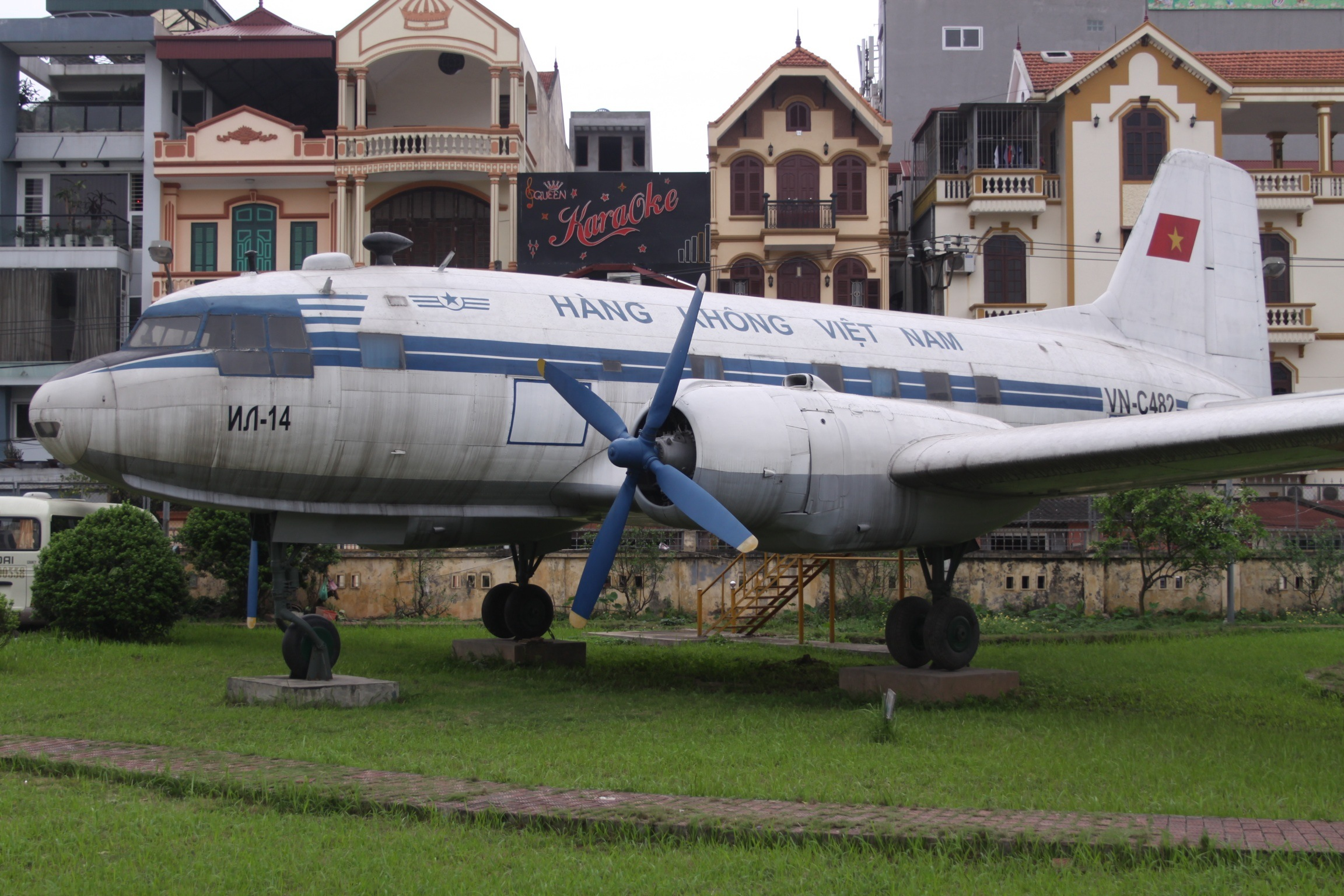
Vietnam Civil Aviation Ilyushin Il-14

Vietnam Airlines has its origins in January 1956, when it was established by the North Vietnamese government under the name Vietnam Civil Aviation (Vietnamese: Hàng không Việt Nam, lit. 'Vietnam Aviation') following the nationalization of Gia Lam Airport. It was instituted after the government signed Decree No. 666/TTg. Under the designation 919th Transport Air Force Regiment (Trung đoàn Không quân vận tải 919), the airline was created as part of the air force for civilian purposes with support from both the Soviet Union and China; initially, its fleet consisted of two Lisunov Li-2s that were later replaced by two Ilyushin Il-14 and three Aero Ae-45s. This was due to an embargo that prohibited the airline from leasing and/or buying American technology or components.

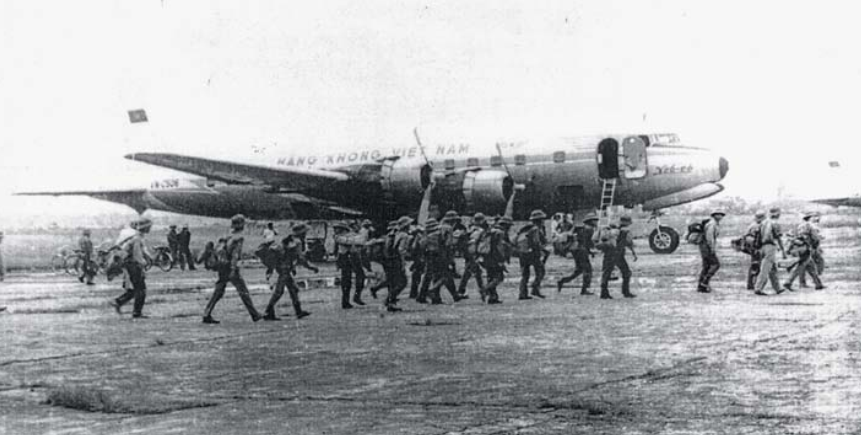
A 919th Regiment-operated DC-6 (likely inherited from Air Vietnam and was flying under Vietnam Civil Aviation livery) participated in the mobilization of Vietnamese troops to Northern border amid Sino-Vietnamese War

The airline's development and expansion was seriously hampered by the Vietnam War (1955–1975). Following the war, its first international destination was Beijing, followed by Vientiane in 1976. During that year, the airline was known as General Department of Civil Aviation in Vietnam, and began full operations; it carried around 21,000 passengers, one-third of whom were on international flights, and 3,000 tonnes (6,600,000 lb) of cargo. In 1978, another important destination of Vietnam Airlines was added, with flights offered to Bangkok. The late 1980s and early 1990s saw the expansion of the network to Hong Kong, Kuala Lumpur, Manila and Singapore.

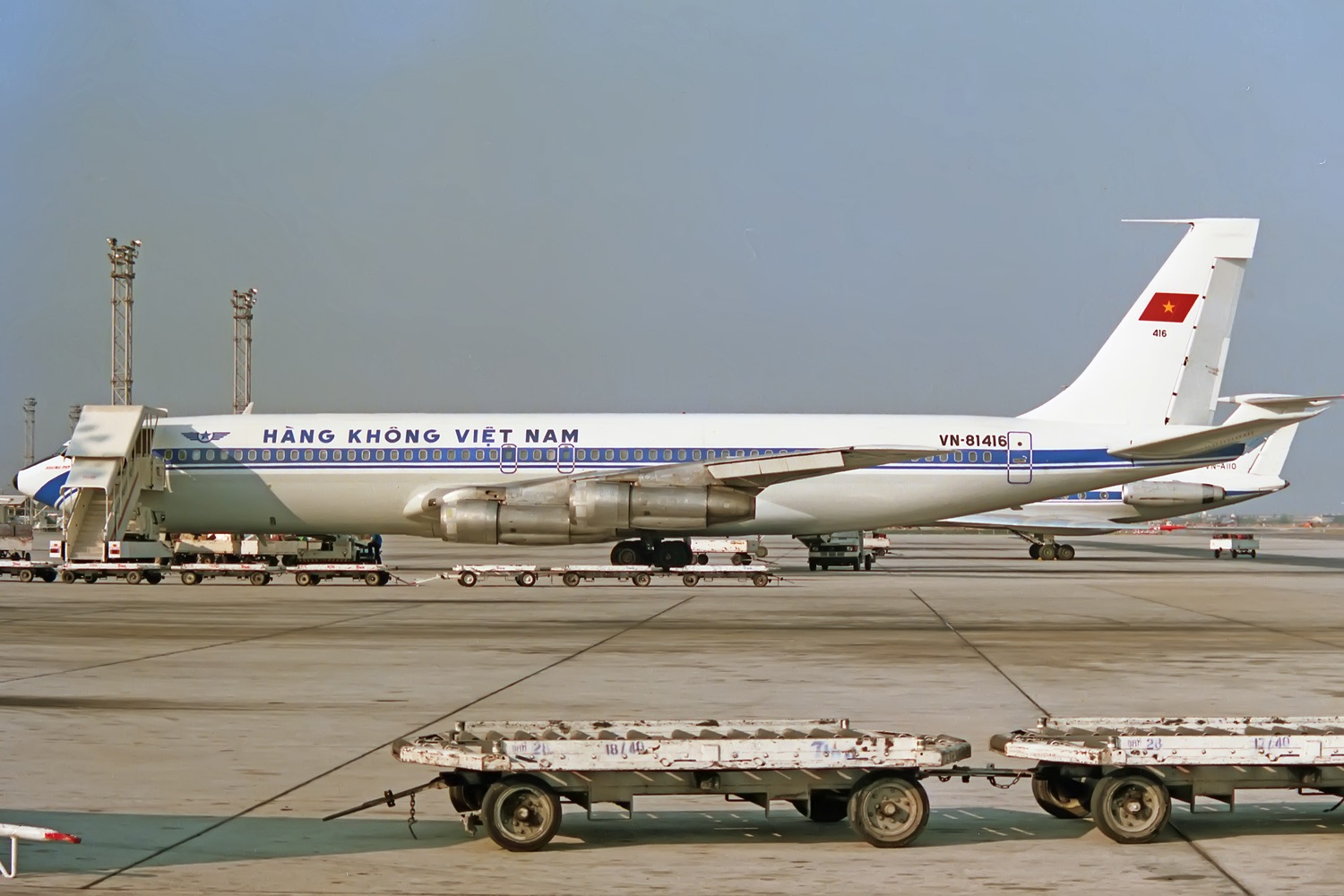
Vietnam Civil Aviation's Boeing 707 at Don Mueang International Airport in 1987

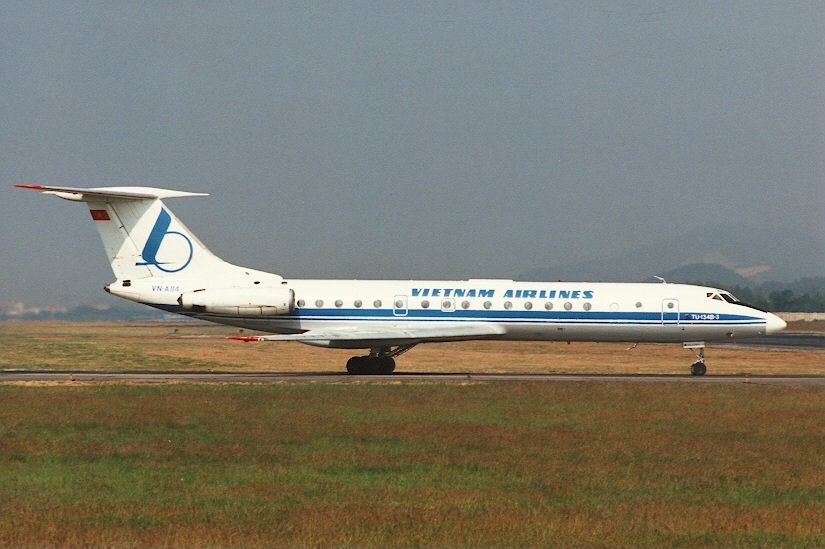
Vietnam Airlines Tupolev Tu-134 at the old Guangzhou Baiyun International Airport in 1996

In 1990, the company initiated discussions regarding the incorporation of Western-built aircraft into the fleet. Later that year, however, the carrier had to cancel the acquisition of two Airbus A310s due to their use of US-manufactured engines. By July 1991, the airline struck a wet-lease agreement with Dutch lessor TransAvia. The aircraft involved was a Boeing 737-300, that arrived in Vietnam Airlines' livery. However, the aircraft was returned after the US State Department pressured the Dutch lessor to remove the aircraft from Vietnam. Subsequently, Vietnam Airlines organized a similar but more complicated deal with TEA Basle, who spent the rest of 1991 negotiating a deal with US authorities. Eventually, a solution stating that "[the Boeing 737] must be positioned outside Vietnam, with no logo or lettering of Vietnam Airlines. On these conditions, it could operate on behalf of Vietnam Airlines" was reached. In December 1991, Cathay Pacific and Vietnam Airlines agreed on a 50–50 joint venture to operate between Hong Kong and Vietnam, as the airline's Tupolev Tu-134 fleet did not meet Kai Tak Airport's noise restrictions.

In October 1992, the Boeing 737 was supplemented with an Airbus A310. However, a dispute with Bulgarian Jes Air over who should pay for the repairs after the aircraft sustained an engine failure led to its replacement with another A310 from GATX, also operated by Jes Air. A similar dispute with United Technologies encouraged the airline to switch from Airbus to Boeing. Hence, a Boeing 767-200ER, leased from Ansett Worldwide Aviation Services (AWAS), arrived in January 1993, and a Royal Brunei Airlines Boeing 767-300ER, arrived the following year. In October 1993, the first Airbus A320-200 was incorporated over a two-year wet-lease contract with Air France. Vietnam Airlines by now had started discussions with Air France about a partnership, and the French carrier agreed to lease its Airbuses to Vietnam Airlines, and also to provide customer support and pilot/crew training. By that time the route network had further expanded internationally, seeing the incorporation of destinations such as Paris, Tokyo, Seoul, Taipei, Sydney, and Melbourne. In 1993, the airline carried 1.06 million passengers, 418,000 of whom were on international flights.

=== New enterprise: 1993–2006 ===
Vietnam Airlines' former logo. In October 2002, the airline introduced the current golden lotus identity to coincide with the delivery of the Boeing 777 in 2003.

The airline became the flag carrier of Vietnam in 1993, after having completed a restructuring programme that was started four years earlier. In that year, the airline split from the Civil Aviation Administration of Vietnam (CAAV) and became a state enterprise. The move was similar to the reorganization of the Chinese CAAC Airlines into several regional airlines in 1987. Even though the airline gained some independence from the CAAV, it was still known as Civil Aviation Administration of Vietnam within the 1993–1996 period. Also from 1993 to 1995, the 919th Air Force Regiment was eventually re-established as the Flight Crew Division 919 (Đoàn bay 919) - the designation that is still being used by the Vietnam Airlines and its personnel until today - marking the carrier's full transformation from a nominal military unit into a wholly civilian and commercial operator.

In February 1994, US President Bill Clinton lifted the trade embargo to allow Vietnam Airlines the ability to acquire Western-built aircraft. Consequently, Vietnam Airlines announced in April of the same year that it would be phasing out its inefficient Soviet planes. By April 1995, the fleet consisted of nine Airbus A320s (all of them leased from Air France), 11 Antonov An-24s, four ATR 72s, two Boeing 707-300s, three Ilyushin Il-18s, nine Tupolev Tu-134s and three Yakovlev Yak-40s; (Note: In early March 1995, Flightglobal informed the carrier also had three Boeing 767s in the fleet, two of them leased from AWAS and the other one from Region Air.) at this time the route network comprised 14 domestic destinations (including Ban Me Thuot, Da Nang, Dien Bien Phu, Hue, Nha Trang, Phu Quoc and Pleiku) and 16 international destinations (including Bangkok, Hong Kong, Kuala Lumpur and Singapore). On 27 May 1995, the airline, along with a number of other aviation-related businesses, were incorporated to establish Vietnam Airlines Corporation. Two Fokker 70s were purchased in mid 1995 for US$50 million; they were aimed at partly replacing the Tupolev Tu-134 fleet on domestic routes as well as at serving as VIP transport. In December 1995, discussions with GECAS for the lease of three additional, second-hand Boeing 767-300ERs were under way; these ex-Continental Airlines aircraft would act as a replacement for wet-leased Boeing 767 aircraft (three -300ERs and one -200ER leased from AWAS and Royal Brunei) in the fleet.

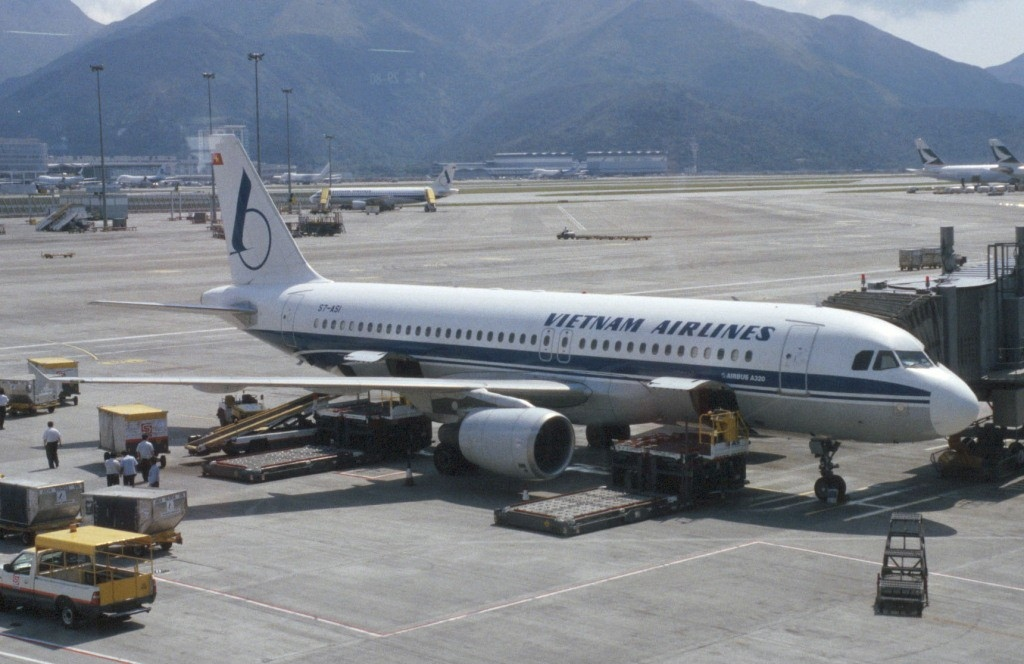
Vietnam Airlines Airbus A320-200 at Hong Kong International Airport in 1999

In September 1996, Vietnam Airlines started offering business class services and in 1999, the airline launched its frequent-flyer program, Golden Lotus Plus; During 1996, Vietnam Airlines looked for aircraft which would substitute the A320s wet-leased from Air France when the deal was over. Apart from acquiring further A320s, the airline considered Boeing 737s and McDonnell Douglas MD-90s. In February 1996, GECAS delivered the first of three Boeing 767-300ER to the carrier, on dry-lease for five years. In October the same year, two Boeing 767-300ERs and a Boeing 767-200, on lease from AWAS and Royal Brunei Airlines, respectively, were returned to the lessors, but in early 1997 another Boeing 767-300ER was phased in on a one-year lease from AWAS. With its freedom to operate Western-built aircraft, Vietnam Airlines considered the acquisition of long-haul aircraft to better service Vietnamese living overseas. The Airbus A340, Boeing 747 and the McDonnell Douglas MD-11 were topics of discussion. Meanwhile, two Fokker 70s were acquired in May and July to replace the twelve Tupolev Tu-134s. On 3 September 1997, the crash of a Tupolev Tu-134B, on approach to Phnom Penh's Pochentong Airport in bad weather, resulted in more than 60 fatalities.

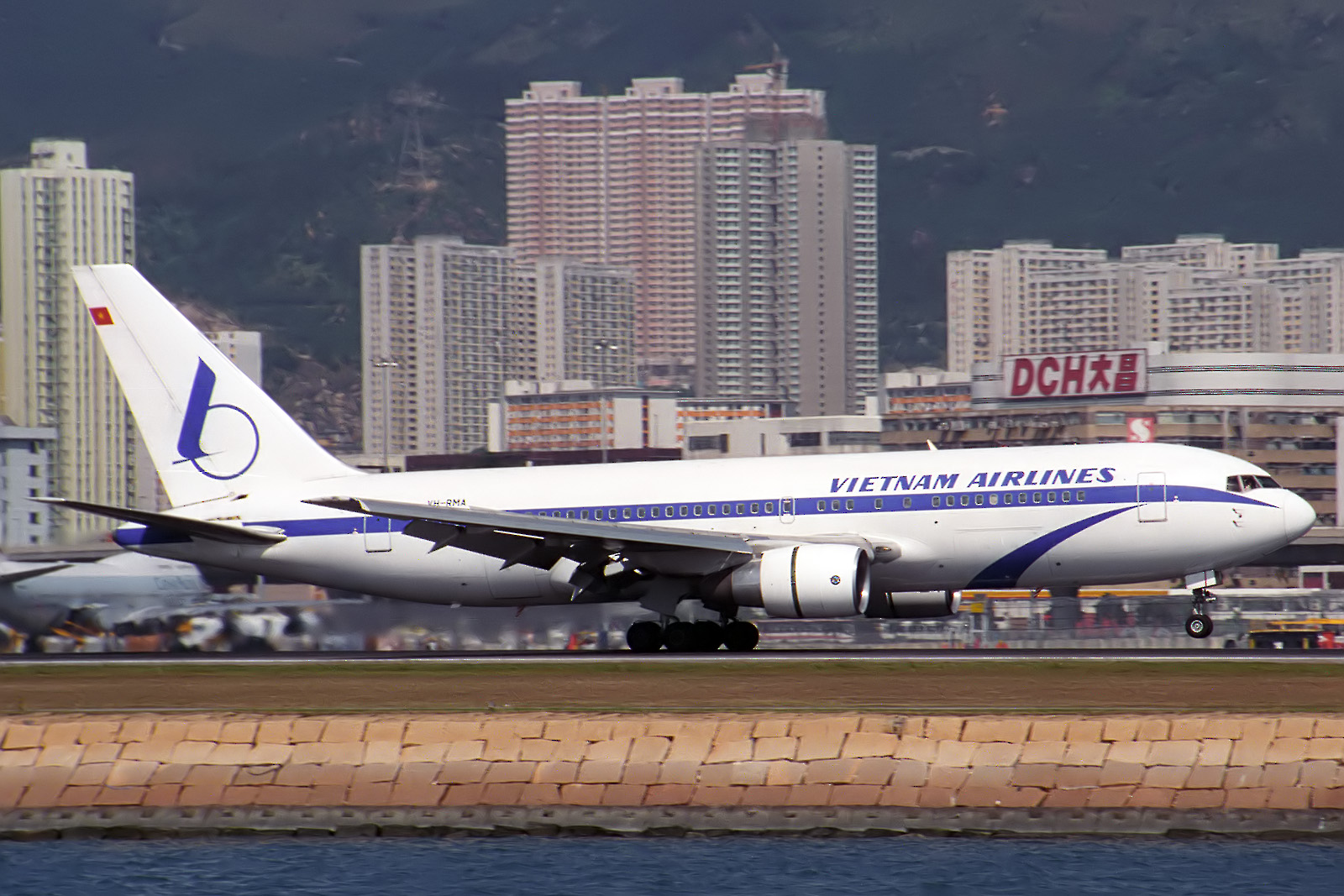
Vietnam Airlines Boeing 767-200ER arriving at HKG Kai Tak in 1996, featuring one of the airline's former liveries.

A new livery was introduced in early 1998, initially unveiled on a Boeing 767.

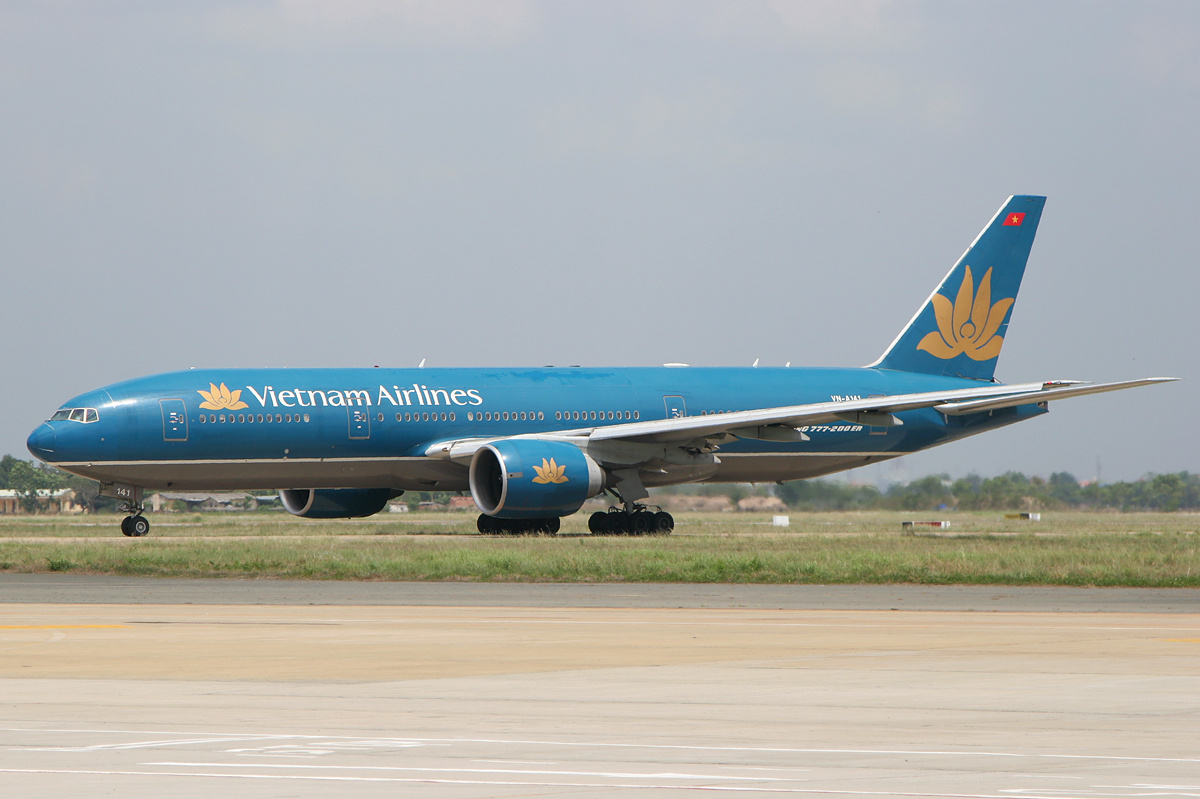
The carrier's first Boeing 777-200ER, with the newer blue livery and golden lotus logo

In December 2001, Vietnam Airlines signed a historic agreement with Boeing for the acquisition of its first ever US-built aircraft, signalling the start of trade under the Bilateral Trade Agreement between the two countries. The deal involved four Boeing 777-200ERs. The transaction was valued at US$680 million; the first aircraft was initially scheduled for delivery in 2003. These four aircraft, along with six others of the same type that are leased from International Lease Finance Corporation (ILFC), are the flagships of the airline, and serve on medium and long-haul routes, respectively. During that year, the airline carried 3.4 million passengers, 1.9 million of whom were on domestic flights; flights to Beijing resumed and services to Kunming were launched. On 4 September 2003, a landmark ceremony celebrated the airline's receipt of its first Boeing 777-200ER purchased outright from Boeing. On 28 October, the airline decided to move its operations in Moscow from Sheremetyevo International Airport to Domodedovo International Airport.

In June 2005, Vietnam Airlines ordered four Boeing 787-8s. Twelve additional 787-8s were ordered in late 2007, some of them to be directly acquired from the company, and the rest to be purchased by the carrier's subsidiary Vietnam Aircraft Leasing Company (VALC). These new aircraft were to allow Vietnam Airlines to expand its network and replace some leased aircraft. Regarding the delays from Boeing, CEO Pham Ngoc Minh remarked in September 2009, "We are not happy about the constant delays. It affects our business plan. We expected to get our planes in 2009, then in 2010, and now nobody can confirm to us which is the exact delivery date. I can be patient but it gives us a lot of headaches." In 2010 the airline switched its Boeing 787 order from the –8 to the –9 model, stating that 787-8s did not meet all the requirements Boeing initially promised; it was expected that the airline would receive its first aircraft of the type in 2015.

On 20 June 2005, the airline launched direct services to Frankfurt after having discontinued services to Berlin. It came after the 2004–2005 period when travel between the two countries soared 70%. The following year, Vietnam Airlines was admitted into IATA. As part of the move, Vietnam Airlines had to meet the association's IOSA safety standards.

=== Expansion: 2007–current ===
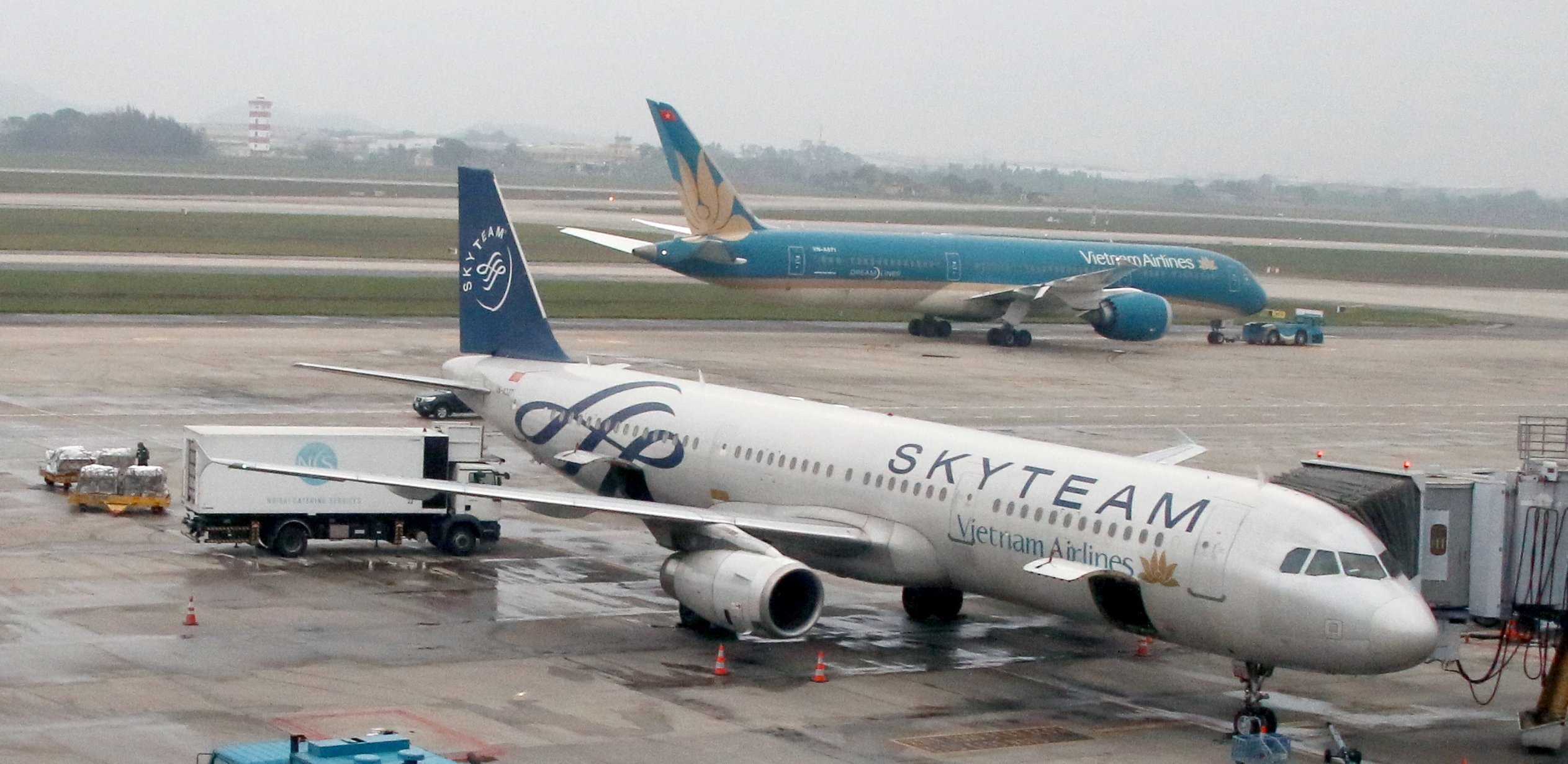
Vietnam Airlines Airbus A321ceo featuring SkyTeam livery, alongside a Boeing 787-9 of the same operator. The A321 has been the carrier's main workhorse in the last decade.

According to several newspaper reports in 2007, the Vietnamese government planned to partly privatize Vietnam Airlines. In the plan, the government considered selling 20–30% of the airline's stake to outsiders, with the government holding the balance. This was a small part of a bigger proposal by the government to privatize its state-owned companies, due to be completed by 2010. Vietnam authorized the plan the following year; however, the plan was not carried out as the airline missed its deadline scheduled by the government, which was arranged for 2010, due to the Great Recession.

On 1 October 2007, the airline and VALC signed a memorandum of understanding for the purchase of ten Airbus A350 XWBs, and 20 additional Airbus A321s. The Airbus A350s will supplement the Boeing 787s already ordered by the airline. This single order will result in Vietnam Airlines becoming one of the largest Airbus operators in Asia. The two companies also ordered five extra ATR 72-500s in December 2007.

Vietnam was chosen as the host of Miss World's 60th contest in 2008. As the country's national airline, Vietnam Airlines was selected as the sponsoring airline for the beauty pageant. Therefore, it was tasked the job of managing all the transport matters for the contest, to be carried out during September and October, just before the beginning of the competition. However, it was later decided to carry out the event in Sanya, China, following speculations of Vietnam withdrawing. In August 2008, Vietnam Airlines added Nagoya, the airline's fourth point served in Japan besides Fukuoka, Osaka and Tokyo, to the route network.

In 2009, Vietnam Airlines and the Government of Cambodia established a joint-venture, having 49% and 51% stockholding, respectively, with the goal of boosting tourism in Cambodia. The joint-venture was a new Cambodian national airline named Cambodia Angkor Air, which started flying in July the same year, using ATR 72 aircraft; an Airbus A321 joined the fleet in September. Also in 2009, the carrier signed a deal for another 16 Airbus A321s plus two Airbus A350s, during the Paris Air Show. In addition, Vietnam Airlines launched a new bilingual website in October to simplify bookings and adopted a new passenger service system designed by IT provider Sabre Airline Solutions.

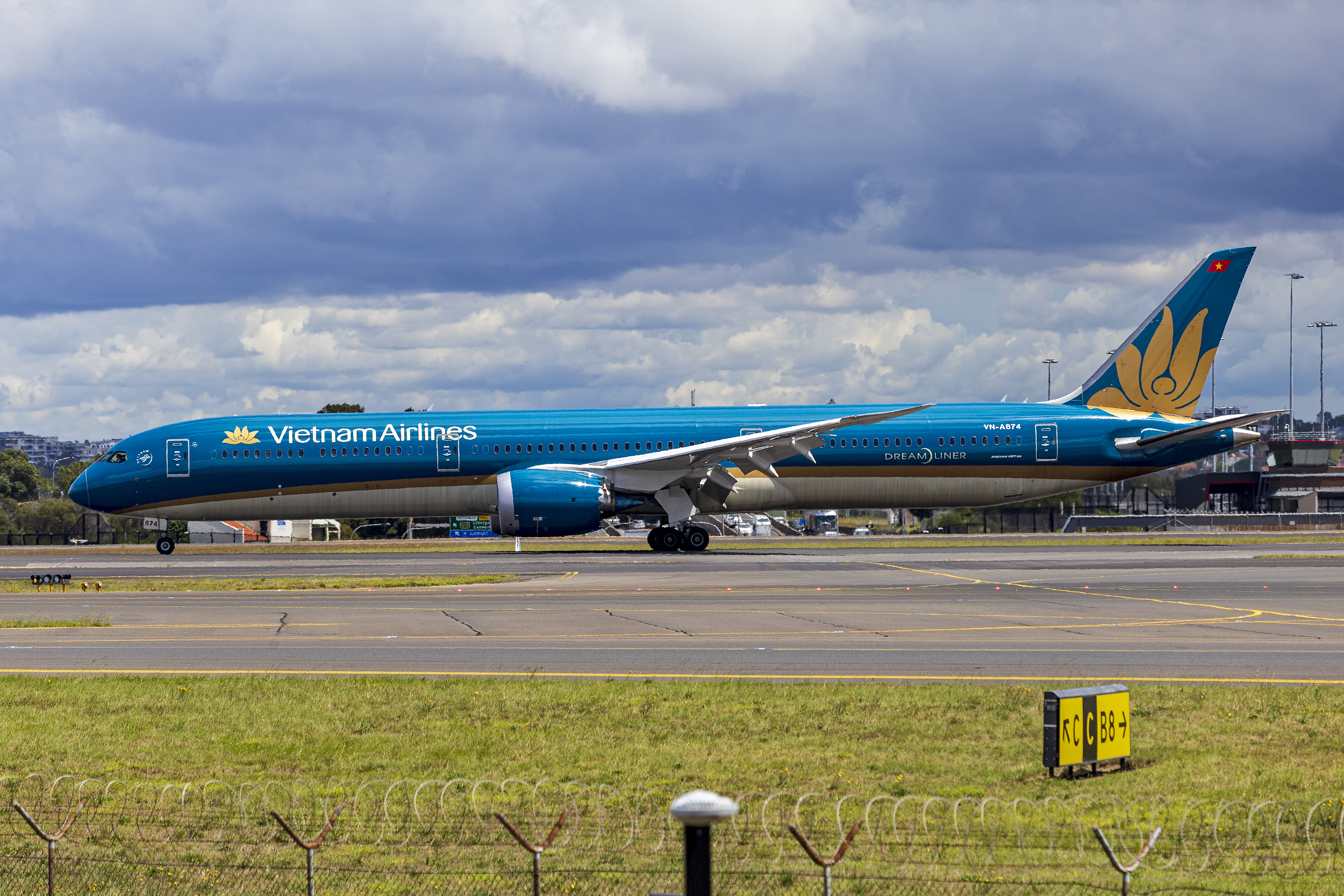
Vietnam Airlines Boeing 787-10 Dreamliner at Sydney Airport

On 26 August 2010, the airline teamed up with Boeing during the unveiling of its interior modernization programme to increase passenger comfort. From late September to early October, Vietnam Airlines discounted up to 85% of its 90,000 fares to celebrate Thang Long-Hanoi's 1000th anniversary. In November 2010, the airline awarded Honeywell a US$100 million contract to retrofit the Airbus A321s' aircraft flight systems, which is calculated to save Vietnam Airlines US$10,000 per aircraft per year.

In January 2011, plans were announced by the airline to re-initiate an initial public offering (IPO) by the end of 2012; an earlier attempt was stalled by the 2008 financial crisis. Scheduled for mid 2014 after several delays, the IPO and subsequent share-offerings will supply the funds to expand Vietnam Airlines' fleet and network. With the company valued at US$1.5 billion, the government plans to initially keep 75% of the shares. The IPO plan was submitted to the Vietnamese Ministry of Transport in June 2014. Scheduled to commence on 14 November 2014, the IPO received two submissions from foreign companies, but their names have not been disclosed. The corporation was scheduled to be restructured by 2015 to bring it in line with other state-owned enterprises and to shift its focus away from non-core businesses. Following restructuring, the airline group will consist of Vietnam Airlines itself, as well as three carriers; in total, the corporation will comprise 26 independently audited companies.

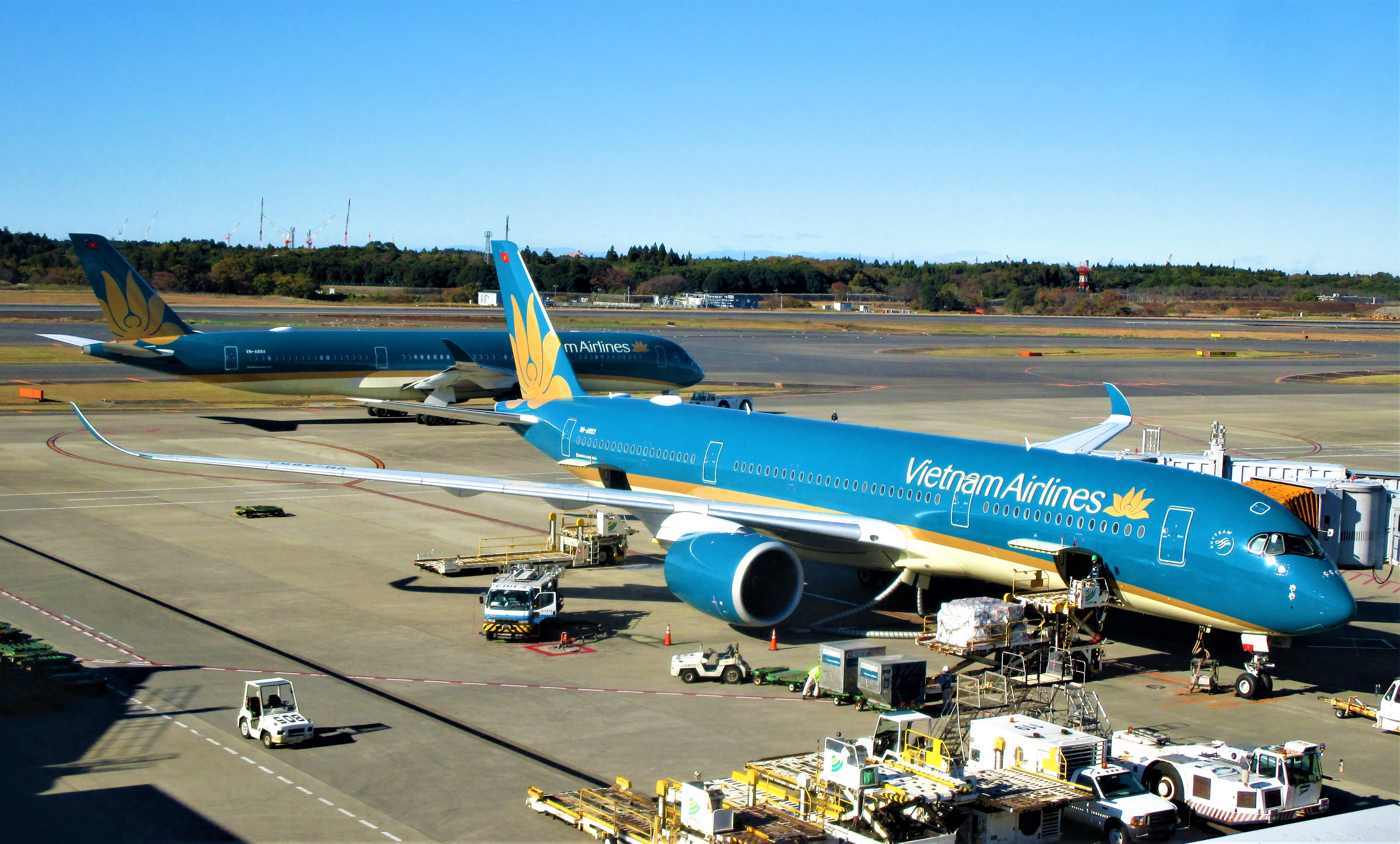
Two Vietnam Airlines Airbus A350-941s at Narita International Airport

In February 2012, Vietnam Airlines boosted its stake in the low-cost carrier Jetstar Pacific Airlines to 70%, with Qantas holding the balance. The Vietnamese flag carrier was the major shareholder in Vietnam's second largest airline, but its stake had been transferred to the Ministry of Finance, and subsequently to the Vietnamese State Capital Investment Corporation (SCIC). The carrier's takeover of SCIC's stake in Jetstar Pacific will capitalize the low-cost carrier with US$27 million, an amount that will be directed towards fleet renewal. In late April 2012, the aircraft lessor ALC announced the placement of an order for eight Boeing 787-9s, which will be leased to Vietnam Airlines; deliveries are expected to start in 2017. In late May 2012, the carrier signed an agreement with Vietnam's Eximbank for a loan worth US$100 million, which the carrier will use to finance the acquisition of four Airbus A321s; a further US$100 million was loaned in April 2013 to finance the purchase of eight Boeing 787s. In a deal valued at US$1.7 billion, Vietnam Airlines signed a contract with General Electric in October 2013 for 40 engines to power the Boeing 787 aircraft the airline had on order.

In July 2014, a new route to Tokyo-Haneda from Hanoi was introduced.

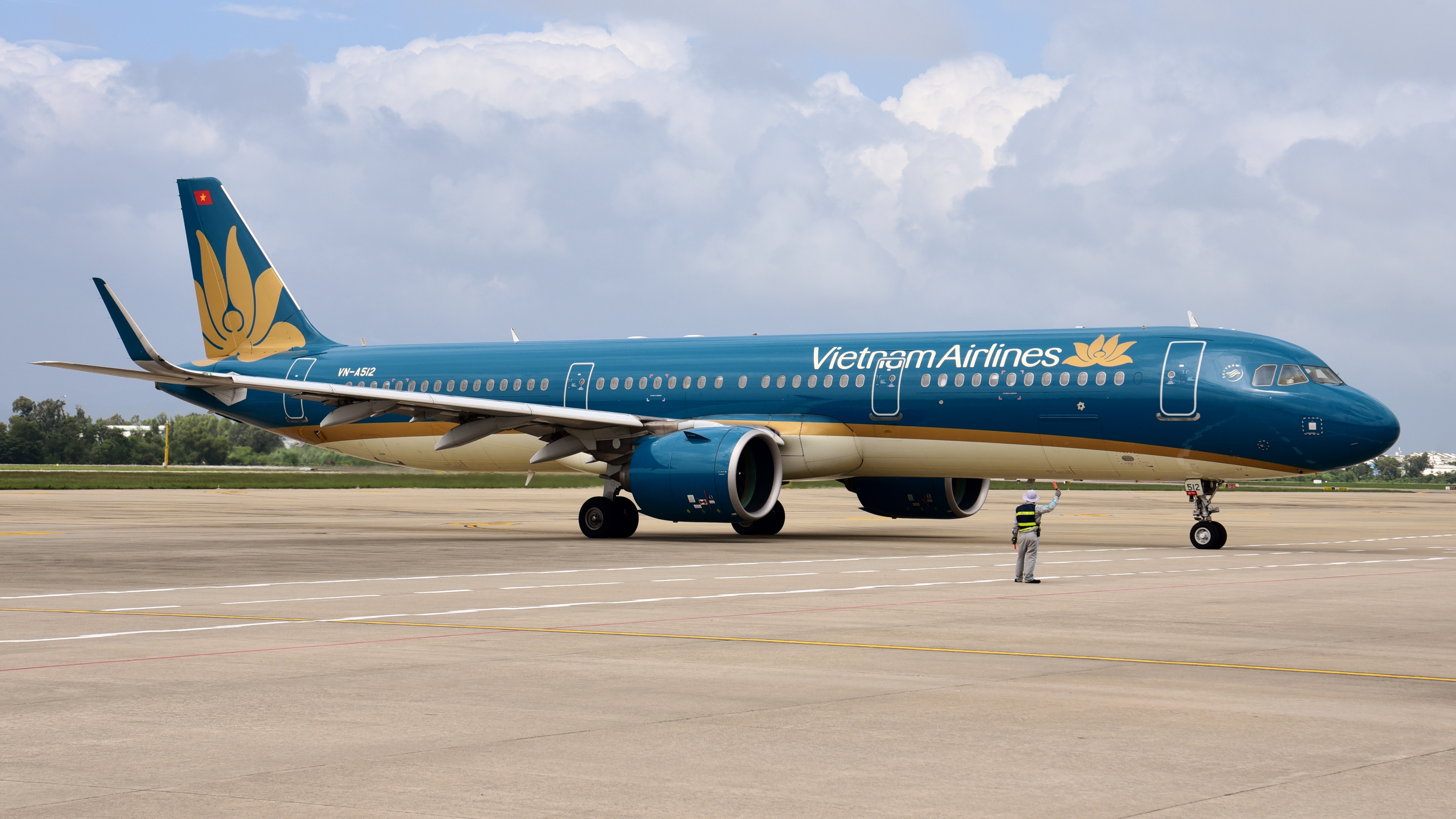
Vietnam Airlines Airbus A321neo at Da Nang International Airport (2023)

Vietnam Airlines received its first Airbus A350-900 in late June 2015, becoming the second operator of the type worldwide after Qatar Airways. In August 2015, the airline's first Boeing 787-9 entered the fleet. In November 2018, the carrier received its first Airbus A321neo. Vietnam Airlines' participation in Cambodia Angkor Airlines ended in April 2020 when all the shares were sold to an undisclosed buyer, while acquiring all Qantas's stake in Jetstar Pacific, eventually rebranding the carrier as Pacific Airlines in the same year. In November 2021, Vietnam Airlines started its first non-stop service to the United States, from Ho Chi Minh City to San Francisco. During the 2022–2025 recovery period following the COVID-19 crisis, Vietnam Airlines focused primarily on digital transformation to enhance customer experience and streamline operations.

== Corporate affairs and identity ==
Vietnam Airlines JSC

- The company's headquarters in Hanoi, 2021.
- Native name: Tổng Công Ty Hàng Không Việt Nam - CTCP (lit. 'Vietnam Airlines Corporation - JSC')
- Type: Government-owned Joint-stock company
- Traded as: HOSE: HVN
- Industry: Airline industry
- Founded: 1996 (with roots tracing back to 1954)
- Headquarters: Long Bien District, Hanoi, Vietnam
- Area served: Asia, Europe, North America and Oceania
- Key people: Dang Ngoc Hoa (Chairman); Le Hong Ha (President & CEO)
- Services: Aircraft maintenance and overhaul, catering, cargo and passenger transport
- Revenue: ▼40,613 billion VNĐ (2020)
- Net income: ▼ -4.97 trillion VNĐ [$216 million] (1Q2021)
- Owner: Government of Vietnam
- Number of employees: 18,641 (2021)
- Parent: Government of Vietnam (86.34%): Ministry of Finance (55.2%); State Capital Investment Corporation (31.14%); ANA Holdings (5.62%)
- Subsidiaries: Pacific Airlines; Vietnam Air Service Co.
- Website: www.vietnamairlines.com

Vietnam Airlines Company Limited was a limited liability company wholly owned by the government of Vietnam, having been restructured from Vietnam Airlines Corporation in June 2010 and then formally became Vietnam Airlines Joint Stock Company in 2015, which is considered as a "exceptional milestone" by the airline. Its role is to provide economic gains to the country, as its tasks, in addition to scheduled passenger and cargo transport, include "responsibility towards labor, contribution to the state budget, and providing chartered flights", according to former CEO Dao Manh Nhung. The airline is headed and overseen by a seven-seat management team, members of which are selected by the Prime Minister of Vietnam. As of September 2022, Dang Ngoc Hoa is the chairman of the company, whereas Le Hong Ha is the president and CEO. As of December 2019, the workforce of the Group numbered 21,255 employees with Vietnam Airlines itself employing 6,409 people. The airline is headquartered in the Long Bien District of Hanoi; previously it was headquartered at Gia Lam Airport in Gia Lam, Hanoi.

When Vietnam Airlines wholly owned Pacific Airlines after Jetstar's withdrawal of stakes in this low-cost carrier, the corporation has started to use the term Vietnam Airlines Group to refer a group consisting of three airlines owned by Vietnam Airlines including Vietnam Airlines (itself), Pacific Airlines and Vietnam Air Services Company.

=== Training ===
In 2009, the airline, Airbus and ESMA Aviation Academy created Bay Viet Flight Training Company to train pilots in the country, with the expectation that up to 100 trainees would graduate annually. In October 2010, the company planned to train 60 pilots in Vietnam during 2011–2012. In 2010, Vietnam Airlines needed 636 pilots, 60% of whom were Vietnamese. It planned to raise that figure it to 75% by 2015, meaning there will be at least 100 recruits each year from 2010 until 2015. Vietnam Airlines also contracts CAE Global Academy Phoenix in Arizona, United States, to train its cadets.

=== Financial performance ===
Vietnam Airlines enjoyed an average of 37% increase in passengers flown per year the 1997 Asian financial crisis and other contributing causes led to a loss in profits for the airline. Nevertheless, the airline remained profitable throughout the crisis. In 1996, the airline carried 2.5 million passengers, up 18% from 1995. The airline carried more than 4 million passengers in 2002, which is an 18% increase over the previous year. Its cargo traffic also climbed 20% during the same period, resulting in a 2002 profit of US$35.77 million.

Despite the severe acute respiratory syndrome (SARS) outbreak, the airline posted a US$26.2 million profit for 2003. In 2006, it carried 6.8 million passengers (3.7 million international) and earned revenue of nearly US$1.37 billion (first 11 months). Vietnam Airlines carried more than 9 million passengers, of which 4 million were international travellers in 2007, the year which saw the airline earning a gross profit of US$23 million from a revenue of US$1.23 billion. It also transported 115,100 tonnes of cargo. In 2009, the airline's revenue was US$1.3 billion, compared to US$1.56 billion it earned the previous year. During this period, Vietnam Airlines carried 9.3 million passengers. According to Anna.aero, Vietnam Airlines' passenger capacity for 2010 rose 30% over the same period of the previous year. This also coincided with the increase in capacity at Vietnamese airports, at 21%. In 2012, the company's total revenue totalled US$2.4 billion, with profits totalling US$3.3 million. The following year, the carrier posted a US$25 million gross profit.

Vietnam Airlines held about 40% of the market share of international passengers flying to and from Vietnam in February 2012. At the time, Vietnam Airlines controlled 77% share of the domestic aviation market, with 14% covered by Jetstar Pacific. As of December 2012, Vietnam Airlines controlled just below 70% of the domestic market share.

In July 2021, it was announced that Vietnam Airlines employees can buy 70 million shares as strategic shareholder ANA Holdings transferred 70 million shares to 15,100 employees of the Vietnam Airlines Group.

=== Subsidiaries and affiliates ===
A Vietnam Airlines A321neo being served by VIAGS equipments at Noi Bai.

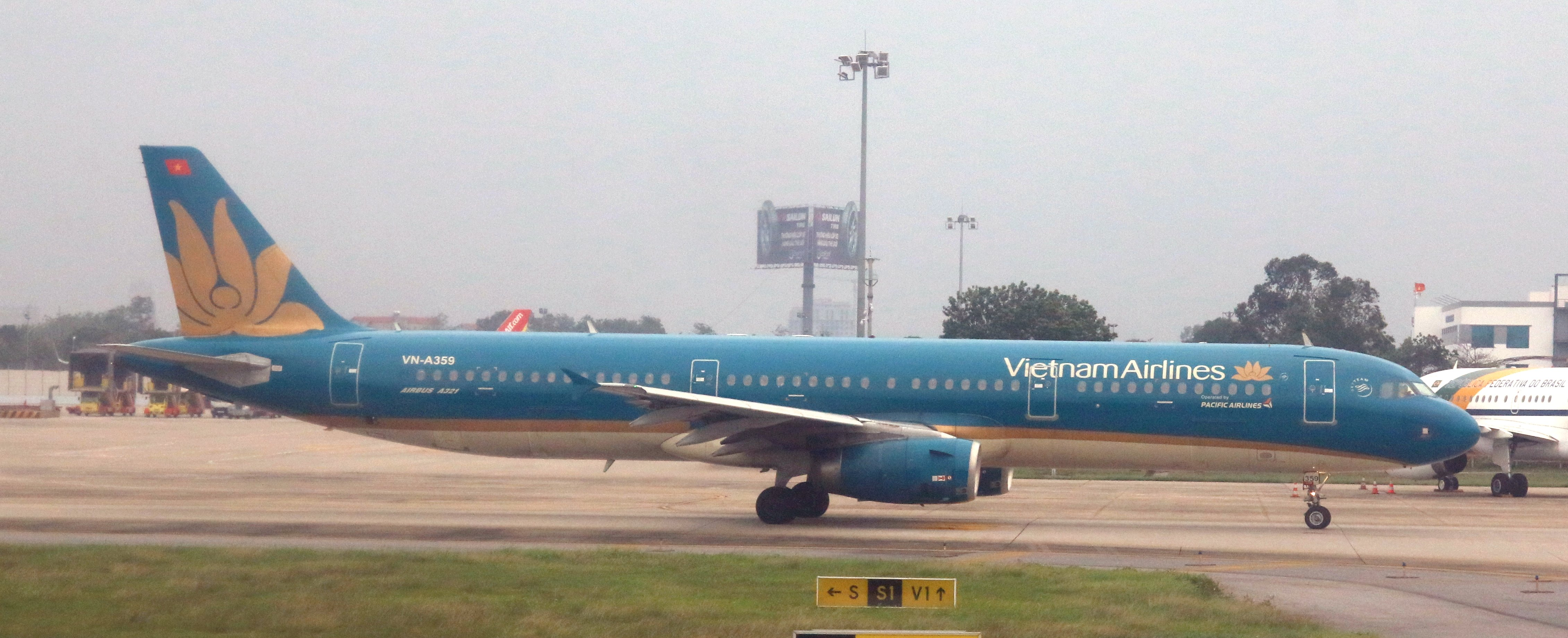
Vietnam Airlines' LCC subsidiary Pacific Airlines is currently using its parents' A321s to maintain operations.

Vietnam Airlines Group has at least 20 subsidiaries and affiliates. By the end of its restructuring in 2015, the company planned to have offloaded its stakes in more than 10 enterprises.

Company	Type	Principal activities	Incorporated in	Group's equity shareholding
Vietnam Air Service Company	Subsidiary	Passenger transport	Vietnam	100%
Vietnam Airlines Engineering Company	Subsidiary	Aircraft maintenance	Vietnam	100%
Vietnam Airlines Caterers	Subsidiary	Catering	Vietnam	100%
NoiBai Catering Services	Subsidiary	Catering	Vietnam	100%
Pacific Airlines	Subsidiary	Passenger transport	Vietnam	98%
Vietnam Aircraft Leasing Company	Joint venture	Aircraft leasing	Vietnam	20%

=== Aircraft maintenance and production ===
Vietnam Airlines is increasingly becoming involved in the maintenance, overhauling, and production of aircraft. Maintenance works are carried out by Vietnam Airlines Engineering Company (VAECO), which was established on 1 January 2009. VAECO was organized mainly upon the amalgamation of the A75 and A76 aircraft maintenance bases. VAECO carries out maintenance and technical services for Vietnam Airlines as well as for other airlines. The establishment of this company opens a new era to the aircraft maintenance field in Vietnam. As of 2013, VAECO was capable of performing a wide range of maintenance on many different aircraft types; this includes C-checks for the Boeing 777, Airbus A330, Airbus A320 and Airbus A321; and D-checks, the most thorough of all maintenance procedures, which are carried out on the ATR 72 and Fokker 70.

In addition to its self-maintenance facilities, Vietnam Airlines also has maintenance contracts with other airlines and maintenance organizations.

There are currently no production facilities in Vietnam for aircraft and spare parts. However, Boeing has managed to obtain 35% of the distribution market in Vietnam, and GE Aviation, in turn, supplies jet engines for the Boeing aircraft. In the future, conversely, Vietnam Airlines is planning to build a maintenance factory in conjunction with Rolls-Royce and other companies. It has also signed a memorandum of understanding with EADS, a pan-European aerospace and defence corporation, that would let the corporation assemble and manufacture plane components in the future.

== Destinations ==
Vietnam Airlines has a network within Asia, North America, Europe and Oceania. With about 300 daily flights, the airline flies to 22 destinations domestically, and to 37 internationally. In addition, it has codeshare agreements with a number of airlines for other routes, some of which span to North America.

Country	City	Airport	Notes	Refs
Australia	Melbourne	Melbourne Airport		
Australia	Perth	Perth Airport		
Australia	Sydney	Sydney Airport		
Cambodia	Phnom Penh	Phnom Penh International Airport	Airport closed	
Cambodia	Phnom Penh	Techo International Airport		
Cambodia	Siem Reap	Siem Reap International Airport	Airport closed	
Cambodia	Siem Reap	Siem Reap–Angkor International Airport		
China	Beijing	Beijing Capital International Airport		
China	Beijing	Beijing Daxing International Airport		
China	Changchun	Changchun Longjia International Airport	Seasonal Charter	
China	Changzhou	Changzhou Benniu International Airport	Charter	
China	Chengdu	Chengdu Shuangliu International Airport	Terminated	
China	Chengdu	Chengdu Tianfu International Airport		
China	Dalian	Dalian Zhoushuizi International Airport	Charter	
China	Fuzhou	Fuzhou Changle International Airport	Terminated	
China	Guangzhou	Guangzhou Baiyun International Airport		
China	Guangzhou	Old Guangzhou Baiyun International Airport	Airport closed	
China	Guiyang	Guiyang Longdongbao International Airport	Terminated	
China	Haikou	Haikou Meilan International Airport	Terminated	
China	Hangzhou	Hangzhou Xiaoshan International Airport	Begins 15 November 2026	
China	Harbin	Harbin Taiping International Airport	Charter	
China	Hefei	Hefei Xinqiao International Airport	Charter	
China	Hohhot	Hohhot Baita International Airport	Charter	
China	Jinan	Jinan Yaoqiang International Airport	Terminated	
China	Kunming	Kunming Changshui International Airport	Charter	
China	Kunming	Kunming Wujiaba International Airport	Airport closed	
China	Lanzhou	Lanzhou Zhongchuan International Airport	Terminated	
China	Nanchang	Nanchang Changbei International Airport	Terminated	
China	Nanjing	Nanjing Lukou International Airport	Charter	
China	Nanning	Nanning Wuxu International Airport	Charter	
China	Ningbo	Ningbo Lishe International Airport	Terminated	
China	Ordos	Ordos Ejin Horo International Airport	Terminated	
China	Quanzhou	Quanzhou Jinjiang International Airport	Charter	
China	Shanghai	Shanghai Pudong International Airport		
China	Shenyang	Shenyang Taoxian International Airport	Charter	
China	Shenzhen	Shenzhen Bao'an International Airport	Terminated	
China	Shijiazhuang	Shijiazhuang Zhengding International Airport	Charter	
China	Taiyuan	Taiyuan Wusu International Airport	Terminated	
China	Tianjin	Tianjin Binhai International Airport	Charter	
China	Wenzhou	Wenzhou Longwan International Airport	Terminated	
China	Wuhan	Wuhan Tianhe International Airport	Charter	
China	Wuxi	Sunan Shuofang International Airport	Charter	
China	Xiamen	Xiamen Gaoqi International Airport	Terminated	
China	Xi'an	Xi'an Xianyang International Airport	Seasonal Charter	
China	Yancheng	Yancheng Nanyang International Airport	Terminated	
China	Yinchuan	Yinchuan Hedong International Airport	Terminated	
China	Zhengzhou	Zhengzhou Xinzheng International Airport	Charter	
Denmark	Copenhagen	Copenhagen Airport		
France	Paris	Charles de Gaulle Airport		
Germany	Frankfurt	Frankfurt Airport		
Germany	Munich	Munich Airport		
Hong Kong	Hong Kong	Hong Kong International Airport		
Hong Kong	Hong Kong	Kai Tak Airport	Airport Closed	
India	Ahmedabad	Ahmedabad Airport	Begins 3 November 2026	
India	Bengaluru	Kempegowda International Airport		
India	Delhi	Indira Gandhi International Airport		
India	Hyderabad	Rajiv Gandhi International Airport		
India	Mumbai	Chhatrapati Shivaji Maharaj International Airport		
Indonesia	Denpasar	Ngurah Rai International Airport		
Indonesia	Jakarta	Soekarno–Hatta International Airport		
Italy	Milan	Milan Malpensa Airport		
Japan	Fukuoka	Fukuoka Airport		
Japan	Ibaraki	Ibaraki Airport	Terminated	
Japan	Nagoya	Chubu Centrair International Airport		
Japan	Osaka	Kansai International Airport		
Japan	Sapporo	New Chitose Airport	Charter	
Japan	Tokyo	Haneda Airport		
Japan	Tokyo	Narita International Airport		
Laos	Luang Prabang	Luang Prabang International Airport		
Laos	Vientiane	Wattay International Airport		
Macau	Macau	Macau International Airport		
Malaysia	Kuala Lumpur	Kuala Lumpur International Airport		
Malaysia	Kuala Lumpur	Sultan Abdul Aziz Shah Airport	Terminated	
Malaysia	Penang	Penang International Airport		
Myanmar	Yangon	Yangon International Airport		
Netherlands	Amsterdam	Amsterdam Schiphol Airport		
Philippines	Cebu	Mactan–Cebu International Airport		
Philippines	Manila	Ninoy Aquino International Airport		
Russia	Moscow	Moscow Domodedovo Airport	Terminated	
Russia	Moscow	Sheremetyevo International Airport		
Singapore	Singapore	Changi Airport		
Sri Lanka	Colombo	Bandaranaike International Airport		
South Korea	Busan	Gimhae International Airport		
South Korea	Muan	Muan International Airport	Charter	
South Korea	Seoul	Gimpo International Airport	Terminated	
South Korea	Seoul	Incheon International Airport		
Taiwan	Kaohsiung	Kaohsiung International Airport		
Taiwan	Taichung	Taichung International Airport	Terminated	
Taiwan	Taipei	Taoyuan International Airport		
Thailand	Bangkok	Don Mueang International Airport	Terminated	
Thailand	Bangkok	Suvarnabhumi Airport		
Thailand	Phuket	Phuket International Airport		
United Arab Emirates	Dubai	Dubai International Airport	Terminated	
United Kingdom	London	Gatwick Airport	Terminated	
United Kingdom	London	Heathrow Airport		
United States	San Francisco	San Francisco International Airport		
Vietnam	Buôn Ma Thuột	Buon Ma Thuot Airport		
Vietnam	Cà Mau	Cà Mau Airport		
Vietnam	Cần Thơ	Can Tho International Airport		
Vietnam	Chu Lai	Chu Lai Airport		
Vietnam	Côn Đảo	Con Dao Airport		
Vietnam	Đà Lạt	Cam Ly Airport	Airport closed	
Vietnam	Đà Lạt	Lien Khuong Airport		
Vietnam	Đà Nẵng	Da Nang International Airport	Hub	
Vietnam	Điện Biên Phủ	Dien Bien Airport		
Vietnam	Đồng Hới	Dong Hoi Airport		
Vietnam	Hải Phòng	Cat Bi International Airport		
Vietnam	Hạ Long	Van Don International Airport		
Vietnam	Hanoi	Gia Lam Airport	Terminated	
Vietnam	Hanoi	Noi Bai International Airport	Hub	
Vietnam	Ho Chi Minh City	Tan Son Nhat International Airport	Hub	
Vietnam	Huế	Phu Bai International Airport		
Vietnam	Nha Trang	Cam Ranh International Airport	Hub	
Vietnam	Nha Trang	Nha Trang Airport	Airport closed	
Vietnam	Phú Quốc	Duong Dong Airport	Airport closed	
Vietnam	Phú Quốc	Phu Quoc International Airport		
Vietnam	Pleiku	Pleiku Airport		
Vietnam	Qui Nhơn	Phu Cat Airport		
Vietnam	Qui Nhơn	Qui Nhơn Airport	Airport closed	
Vietnam	Rạch Giá	Rạch Giá Airport		
Vietnam	Sơn La	Nà Sản Airport	Terminated	
Vietnam	Thanh Hóa	Tho Xuan Airport		
Vietnam	Tuy Hòa	Tuy Hoa Airport		
Vietnam	Vinh	Vinh International Airport		
Vietnam	Vũng Tàu	Vung Tau Airport	Terminated	

=== Tết flights ===
Vietnam Airlines has traditionally increased flights among Vietnamese cities to cater for the heavy demands brought by the annual Tết celebration. This busy period, which could fall anywhere from late January to mid February, is Vietnam's most important celebration; hundreds of extra flights are scheduled by domestic airlines during this period to allow Vietnamese to return to their families, often in rural areas, to celebrate the occasion. In 2010, the airline increased its seat capacity from 45% to 120% on certain domestic routes. In 2011, it increased additional flights on ten routes, adding more than 100,000 seats. About 63,000 of these seats were between Hanoi and Ho Chi Minh City. This represented a remarkable 41% increase against normal days. In 2013, the carrier added an extra 174,000 seats during the celebratory period, of which 82,000 seats were on the trunk route between its primary hubs.

=== Alliances ===
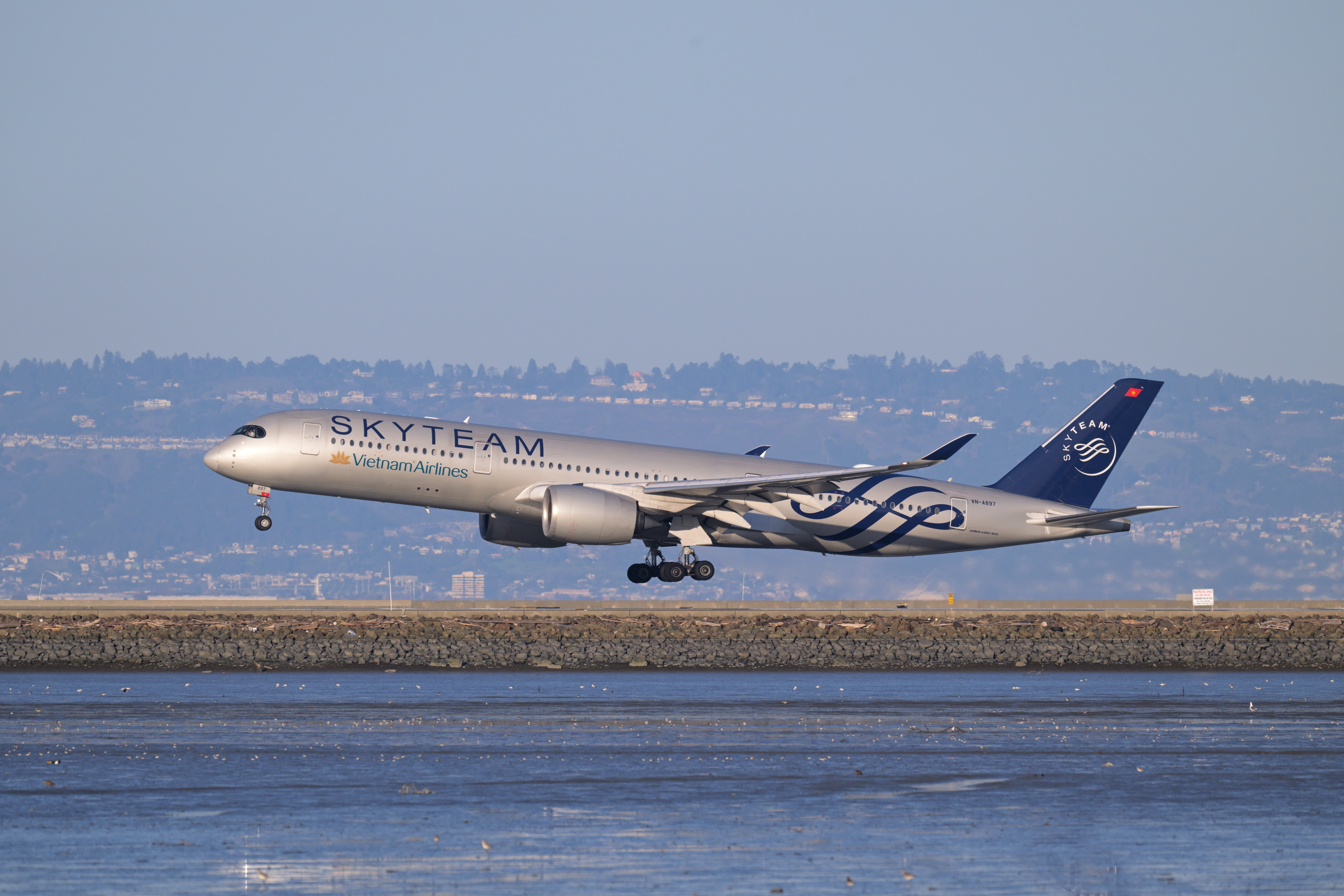
Vietnam Airlines Airbus A350-941 in SkyTeam livery

Vietnam Airlines joined SkyTeam airline alliance on 10 June 2010.

=== Joint Ventures ===
Vietnam Airlines has joint ventures with the following airlines:

- China Southern Airlines

=== Codeshare agreements ===
Vietnam Airlines codeshares with the following airlines:

- Air Cambodia
- Air Europa
- Air France
- All Nippon Airways
- Bangkok Airways
- Cathay Pacific
- China Airlines
- China Eastern Airlines
- Delta Air Lines
- El Al
- Etihad Airways
- Finnair
- Garuda Indonesia
- ITA Airways
- Kenya Airways
- KLM
- Korean Air
- Middle East Airlines
- Pacific Airlines
- Philippine Airlines
- Qantas
- Saudia
- Scandinavian Airlines
- Singapore Airlines
- SNCF (railway)
- TAROM
- Turkish Airlines
- VASCO (subsidiary)
- Virgin Atlantic
- XiamenAir

=== Interline agreements ===
Vietnam Airlines interlines with the following airlines:

- Lao Airlines
- Myanmar National Airlines

== Fleet ==
=== Current fleet ===
As of July 2026, Vietnam Airlines operates the following aircraft:

Vietnam Airlines fleet
Aircraft	In service	Orders	Passengers				Notes
Aircraft	In service	Orders	J	W	Y	Total	Notes
Airbus A320-200	1	—	—	—	—	—	
Airbus A320neo	3	—	4	—	180	184	At least 2 aircraft were not taken up and transferred to Volaris. Delivery starts from July 2024.
Airbus A321-200	42	—	16	—	162	178	One aircraft painted in SkyTeam livery. Older aircraft to be retired.
Airbus A321-200	42	—	16	—	168	184	One aircraft painted in SkyTeam livery. Older aircraft to be retired.
Airbus A321-200	42	—	8	—	195	203	One aircraft painted in SkyTeam livery. Older aircraft to be retired.
Airbus A321neo	20	—	8	—	195	203	
Airbus A350-900	14	—	29	45	231	305	
Airbus A350-900	14	—	29	36	240	305	
Boeing 737 MAX 8	—	69	TBA				19 from lessors
Boeing 787-9	11	—	28	35	211	274	
Boeing 787-9	11	—	28	—	283	311	
Boeing 787-10	6		24	—	343	367	
Vietnam Airlines Cargo fleet
Airbus A321-200/P2F	—	2	Cargo				
Total	97	71					

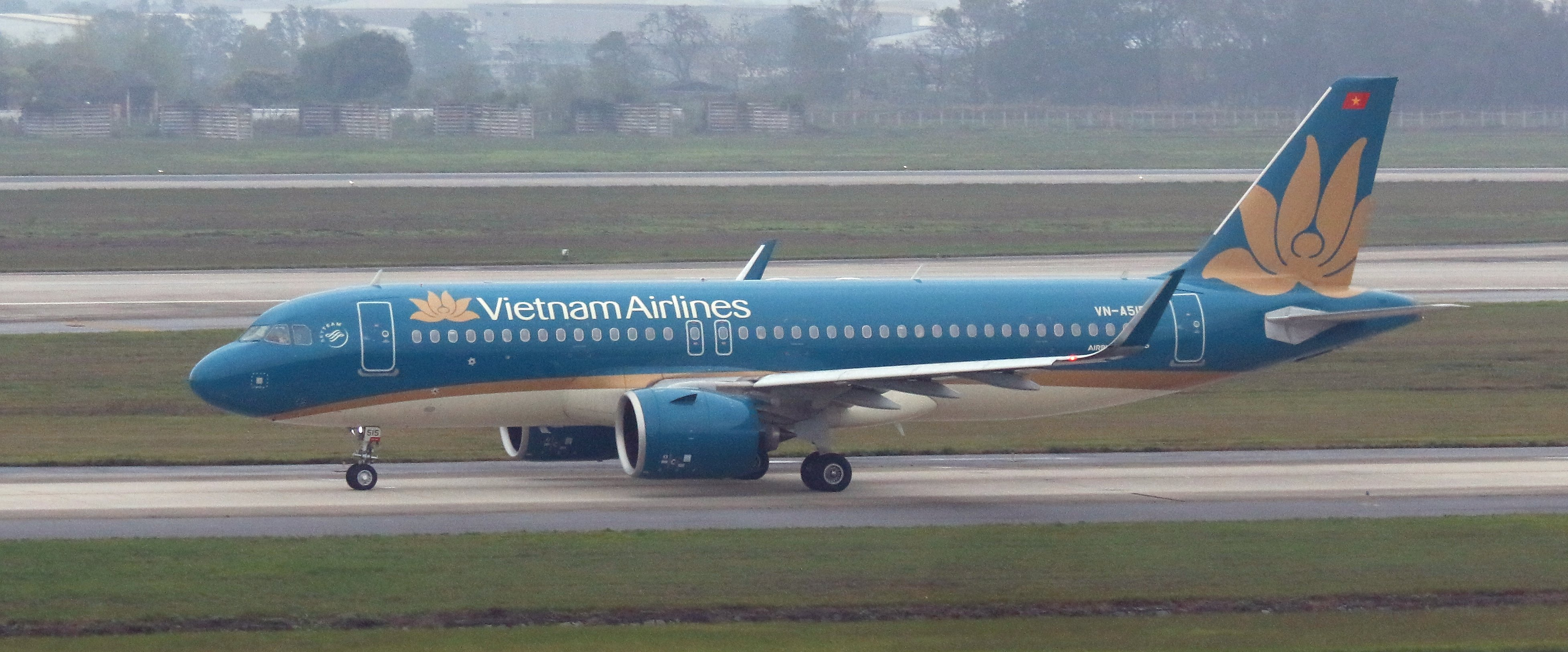
Airbus A320neo

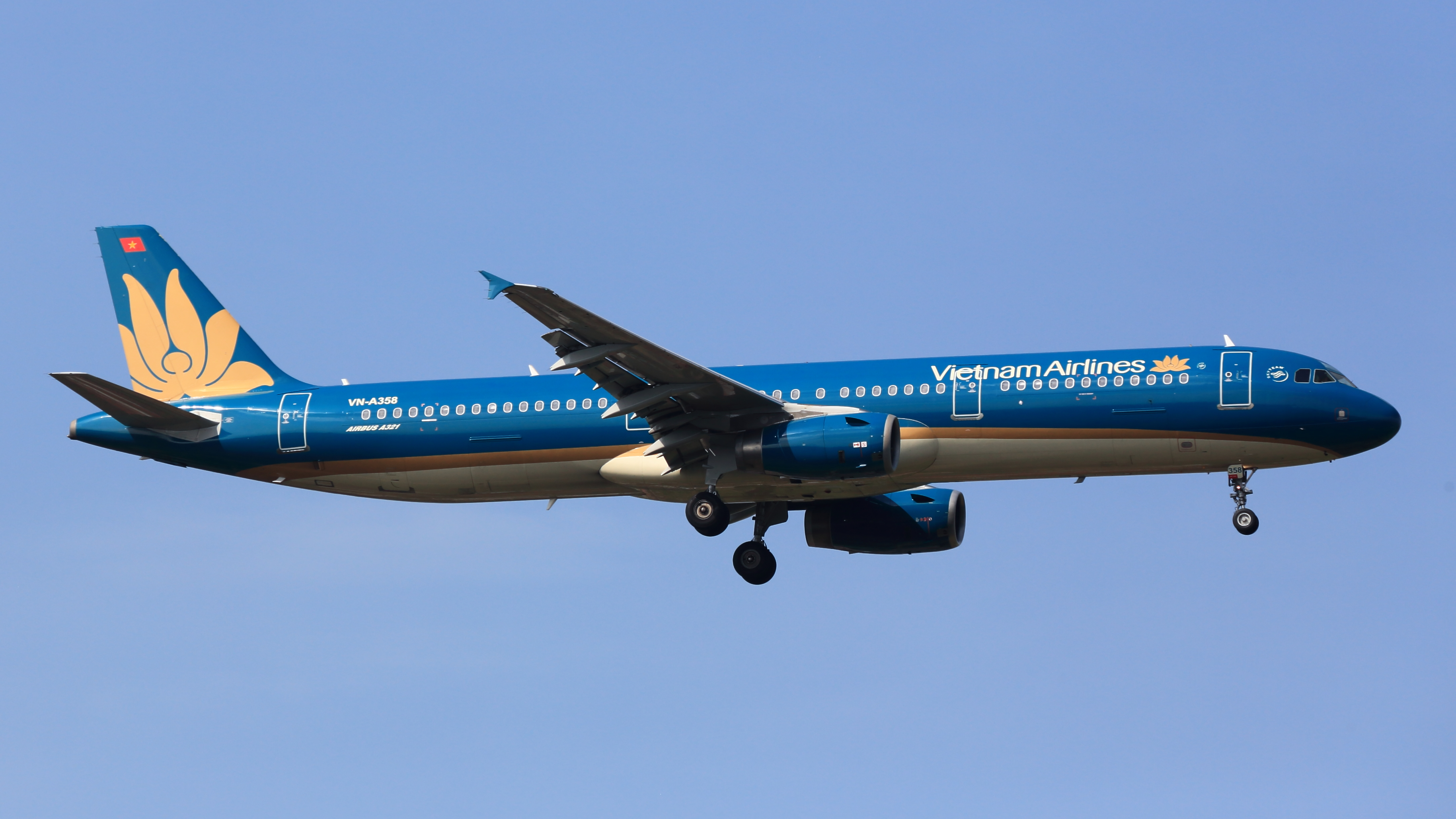
Airbus A321-200

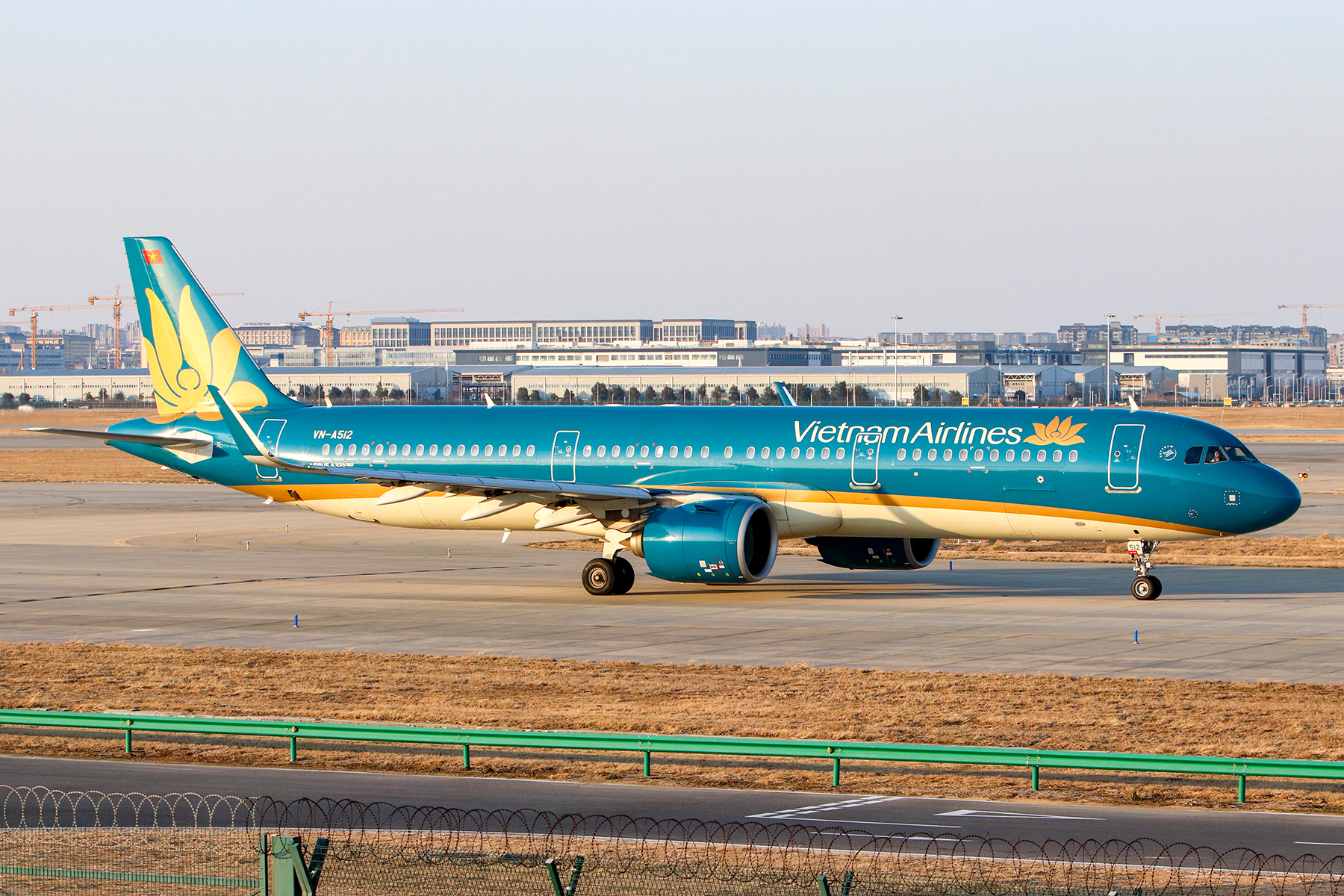
Airbus A321neo

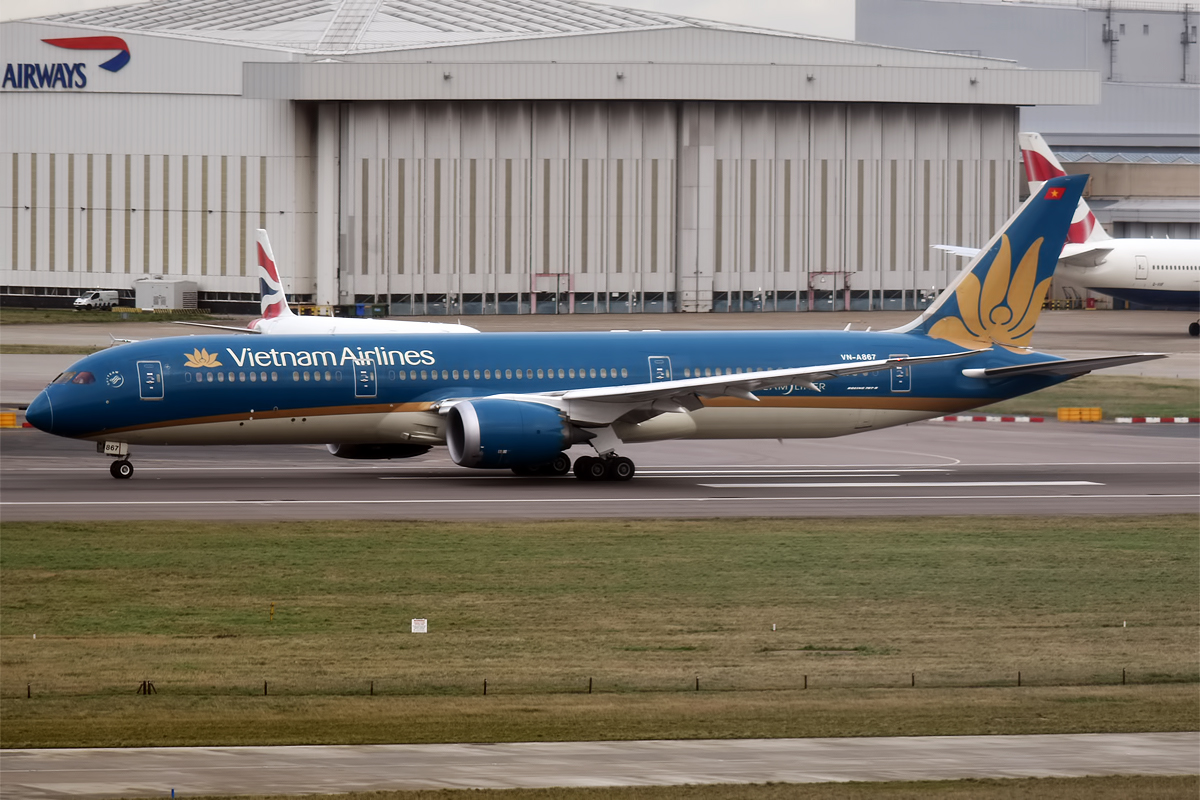
Boeing 787-9 Dreamliner

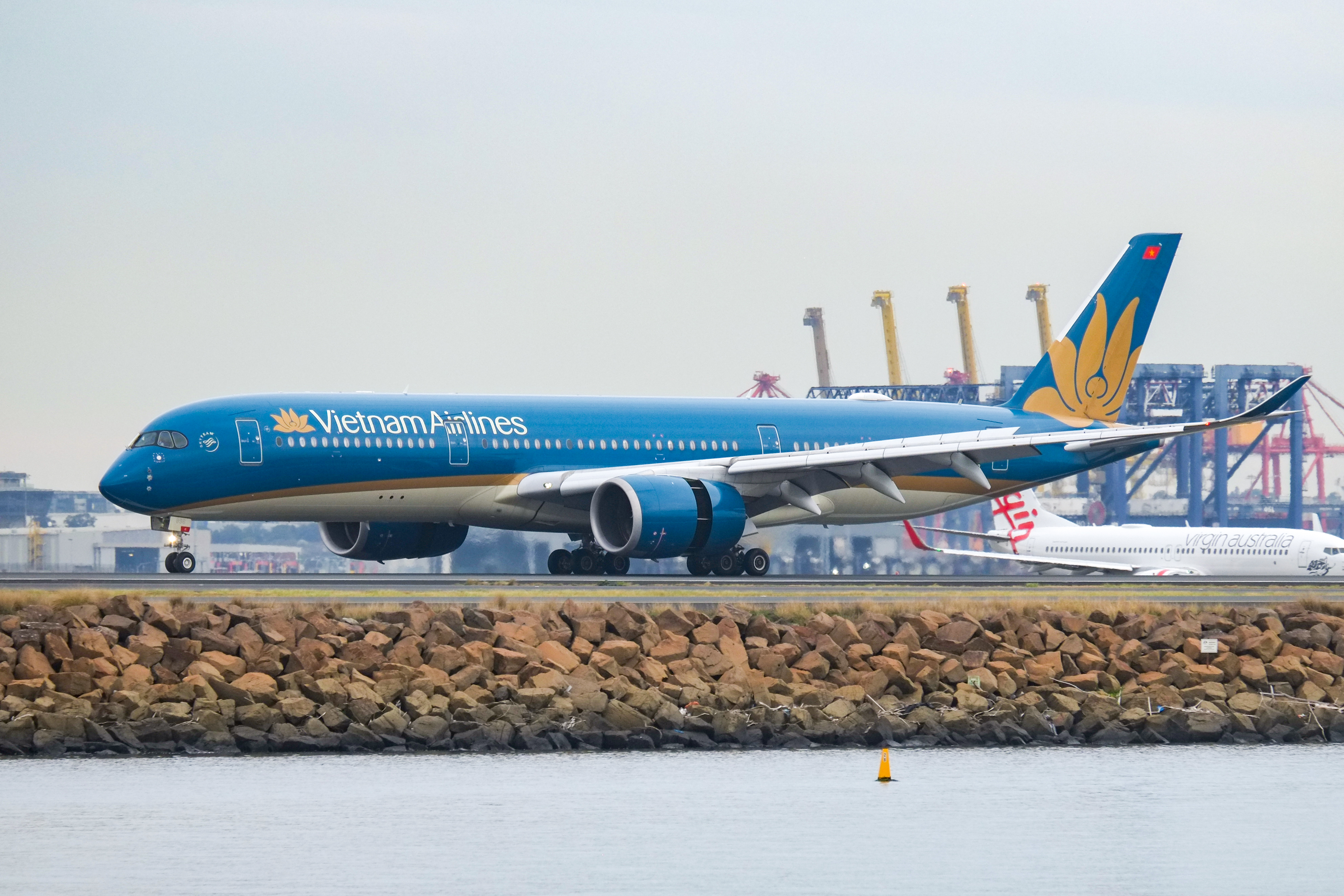
Airbus A350-900 XWB

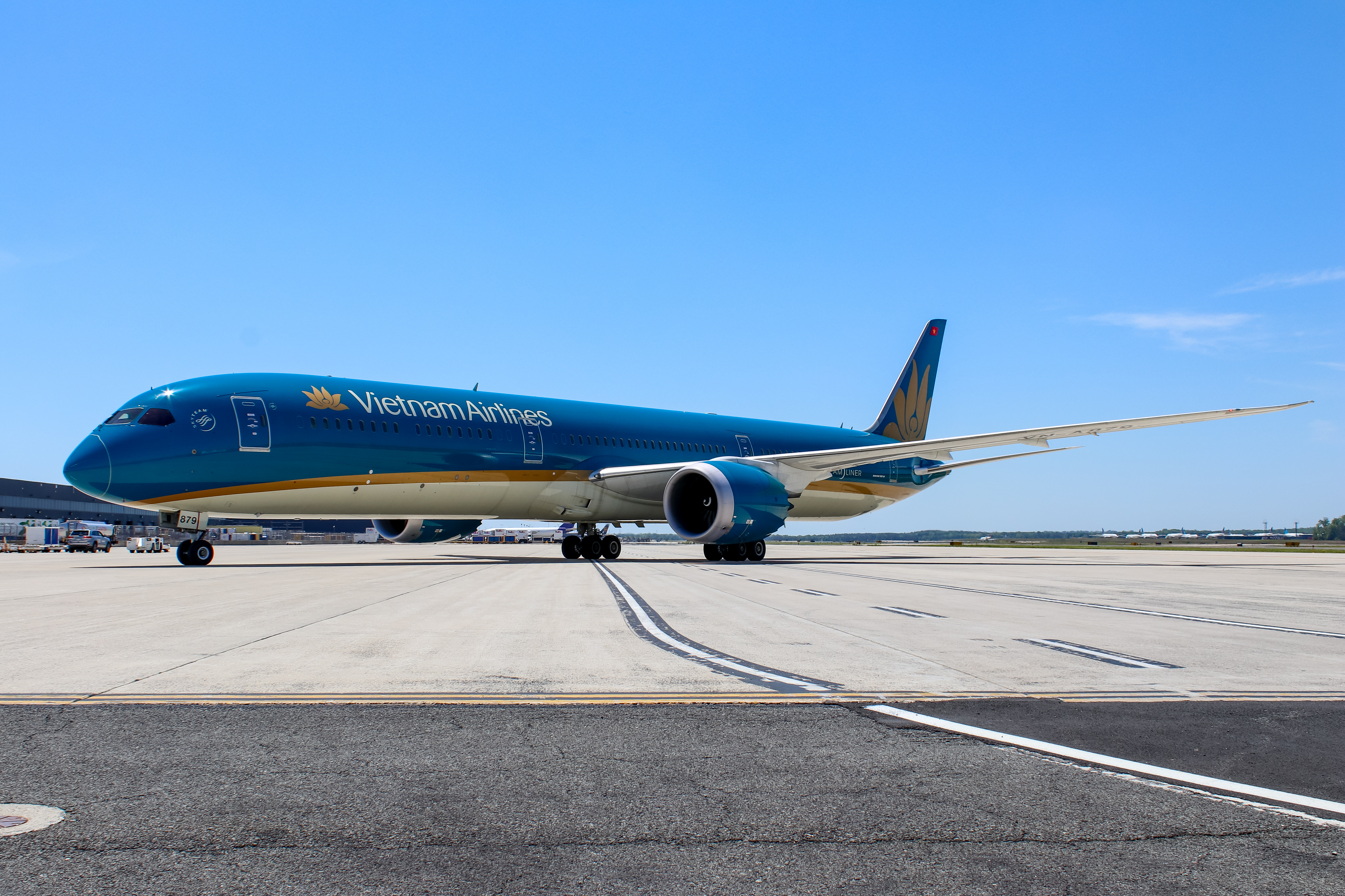
Boeing 787-10 Dreamliner

=== Fleet development ===
In 2023, Vietnam Airlines signed a memorandum of understanding with Boeing for fifty 737 MAX 8, which are expected to replace a majority, if not all, of the carrier's ageing Airbus A321ceo fleet. As of 2025, Vietnam Airlines have been financially arranging to firm up the order, which may realistically worth more than US$8 billion, according to the 2025 US-Vietnam governmental joint statement. In February 2026, the airline finalized the MAX order with deliveries beginning in 2030.

In 2025, Vietnam Airlines announced that it plans to expand its fleet with up to 30 new widebody aircraft, specifically defined that the types should be Airbus A350-900 or Boeing 787-9, while also mentioned that it would consider any type of offer from leasing to purchasing for delivery during 2028–2032. A firm order for 30 widebodies may worth up to US$10 billion, per listing price. In early 2026, the Vietnamese flag carrier announced RfP for lease of nine Boeing 787-8.

In another plan, the carrier aims to operate a 150-aircraft fleet in 2030 and more than 200 aircraft by 2035.

=== Previously operated ===
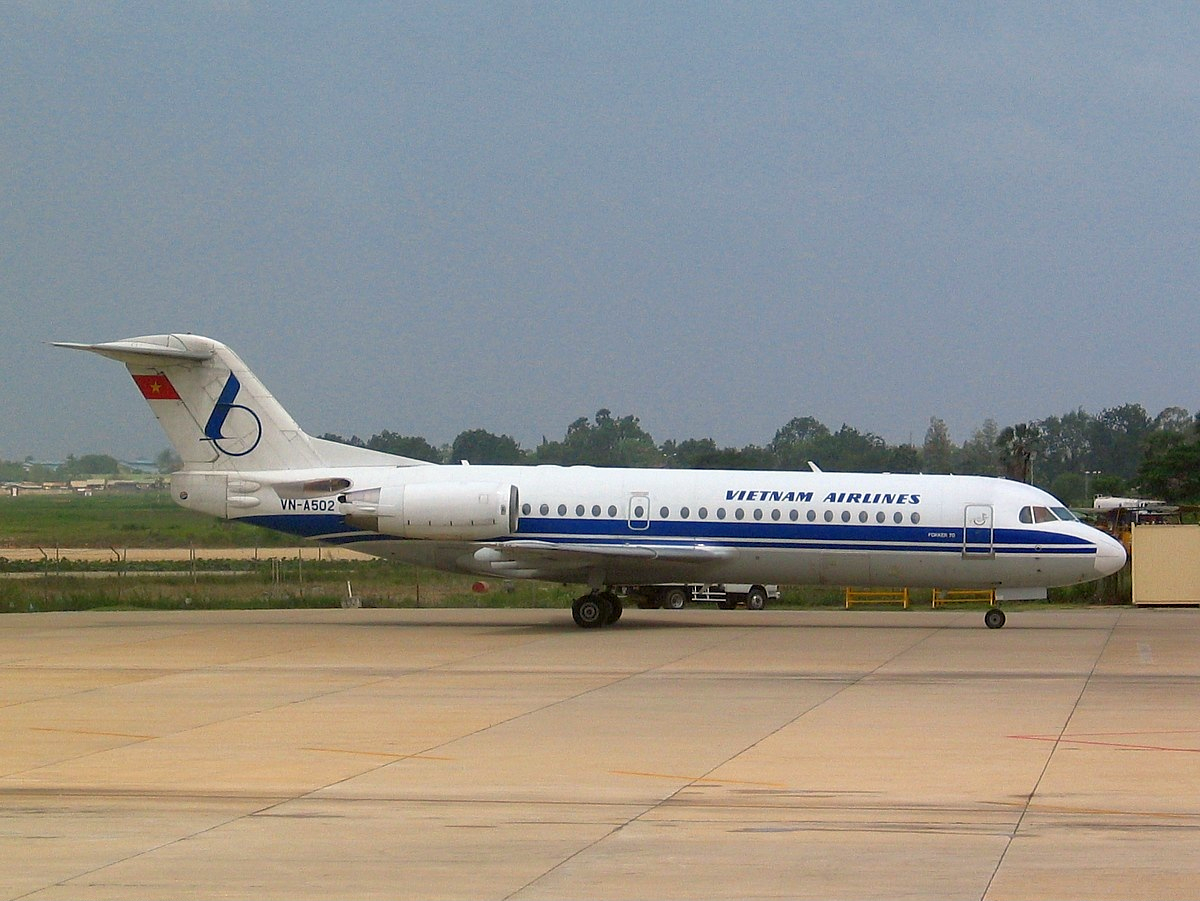
Vietnam Airlines Fokker 70 at Pochentong Airport in 2004

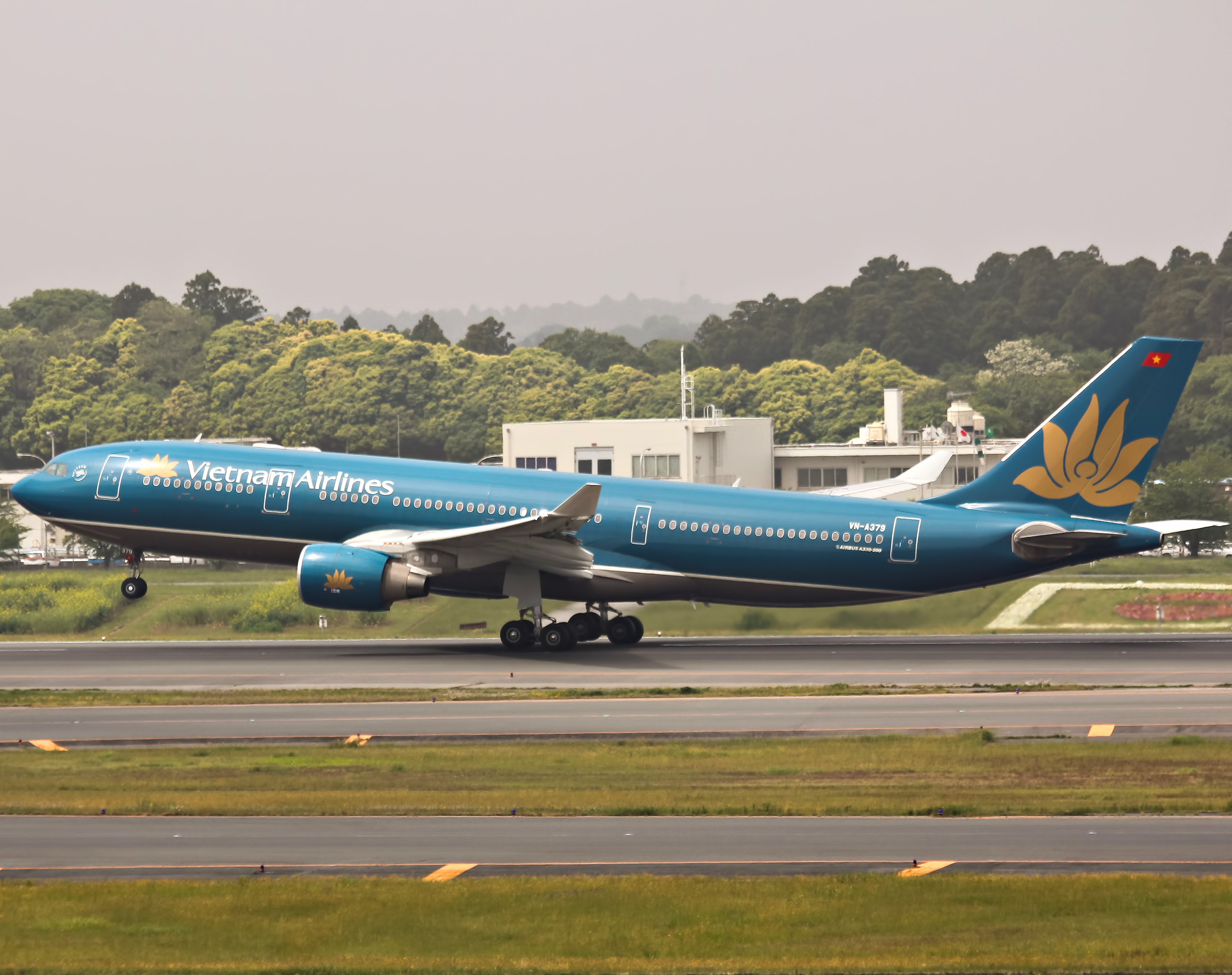
An Airbus A330-200 of Vietnam Airlines in 2013

Since its conception in 1956, the airline has operated a wide range of aircraft, including Soviet, American, and European aircraft. Having retired all Soviet-made planes, the airline currently uses Boeing and Airbus aircraft.

Vietnam Airlines has operated the following aircraft throughout its history:

- Aero Ae-45
- Airbus A300-600
- Airbus A300B4
- Airbus A310-200
- Airbus A310-300
- Airbus A320-200
- Airbus A321-100
- Airbus A330-200
- Airbus A330-300
- Antonov An-2
- Antonov An-24
- Antonov An-30
- ATR 72-200
- Boeing 707-320
- Boeing 707-320B
- Boeing 707-320C
- Boeing 727-100
- Boeing 727-200
- Boeing 737-300
- Boeing 767-200ER
- Boeing 767-300ER
- Boeing 777-200ER
- Douglas DC-3
- Douglas DC-4
- Douglas DC-6
- Fokker 70
- Ilyushin Il-14G
- Ilyushin Il-18
- Lisunov Li-2
- Mil Mi-4
- Tupolev Tu-134A
- Tupolev Tu-134B
- Yakovlev Yak-40

== Services ==
=== Entertainment ===
On flights operated using Airbus A350 XWB and Boeing 787 Dreamliner, Vietnam Airlines offers in-flight entertainment via personal televisions. On flights operated using Airbus A321neo, Vietnam Airlines offers in-flight entertainment via personal devices. Entertainment options consist of films, games, TV programmes, audiobooks and music. Vietnam Airlines offers two in-flight magazines, Heritage and Heritage Fashion, in addition to other reading material.

=== Cabins ===
Business

Business class is the highest of the three cabin classes offered by the airline. As is the case with business class cabins in most airlines, the amenities offered in this class are substantially different from economy class, and more services and products are available. On Airbus A321s, recliner seats are offered, laid out in a 2-2 configuration. The seat offers 45 inches of pitch, 10 degrees of recline as well as foot and leg rest. On Boeing 787s and Airbus A350s, lie-flat seats in a 1-2-1 configuration are offered. A 15.4-inch entertainment screen is available on the two aircraft. Seats are arranged in a reverse herringbone configuration on Boeing 787 and staggered seating is available on Airbus A350. Refreshments are offered on flights over 90 minutes, with hot meals available on flights that are longer than two hours.

Premium Economy

Vietnam Airlines' premium economy class has a wider seat width and legroom compared to Economy with 38–42 in (97–107 cm) of seat pitch and 7-8 inches of recline. This class is offered only on flights operated by Boeing 787-9 or Airbus A350. On every flight featuring Premium Economy, hot meals are served with an extensive menu of Vietnamese delicacies and popular world cuisine. Personal care bags with essential amenities are also provided. Premiere brand cosmetics and aqua water are available in the restroom during longer flights. Refreshments are served on flights over 90 minutes, with hot meals available on flights that are longer than two hours.

Economy

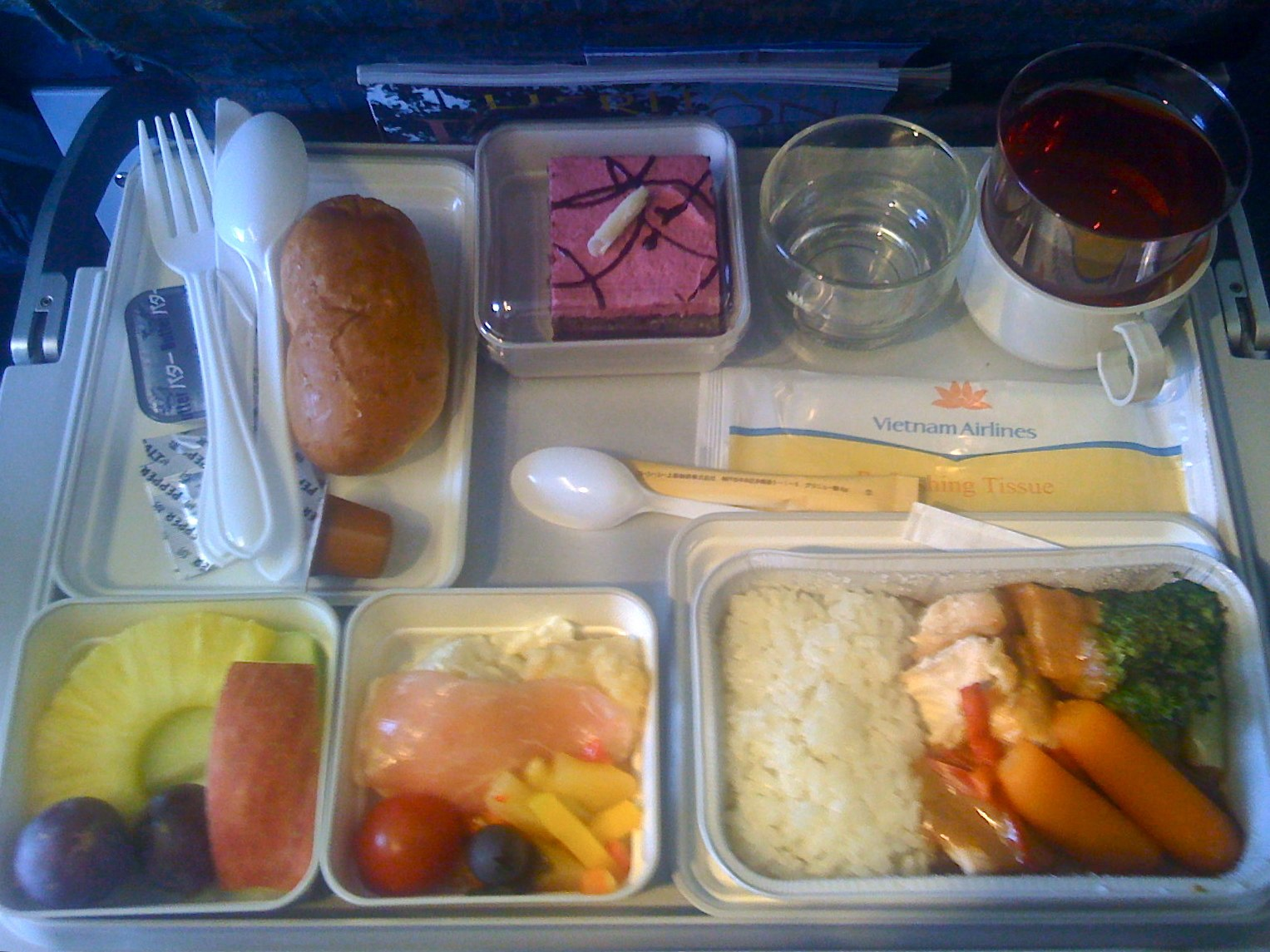
Vietnam Airlines economy class meal

Economy class is available on all flights operated by Vietnam Airlines. Seats in this cabin feature seats 81 cm (32 in) in width. Seat pitch on this cabin class is 31–32 in (79–81 cm), while seat recline ranges from 6-13° (5-6 inches). Refreshments are offered on flights over 90 minutes, with hot meals available on flights that are longer than two hours.

=== Lotusmiles ===
Lotusmiles (stylized as LotuSmiles) is the airlines' frequent flyer program. The program consisted of five tiers (Silver, Titanium, Gold, Platinum and Million Miler) with benefits varying between tiers. Membership in this program is free, and members can earn miles in different ways (flying in carriers within Vietnam Airlines Group, SkyTeam carriers and carriers partnered with Vietnam Airlines based on distance and seating class, daily shopping with co-branded credit cards, using partners' services such as Booking.com or direct payments). Accumulated miles can be redeemable to buy tickets and items at Lotusmall or exchange for vouchers for Vingroup services.

== Accidents and incidents ==
According to Aviation Safety Network, Vietnam Airlines has experienced six accidents/incidents since 1951, three of them leading to fatalities.

=== Fatal incidents ===
- 26 March 1981: An Ilyushin Il-18D, possible aircraft registration VN-B190, crashed in Hoa Binh Province, Vietnam. Those on board the plane are presumed dead.
- 9 September 1988: Vietnam Airlines Flight 831, a Tupolev Tu-134, VN-A102, departed from Hanoi with 81 passengers aboard and crashed while on approach to Bangkok, killing 76 people. The aircraft flew into a heavy thunderstorm and was probably struck by lightning. The aircraft then exploded after it crashed into a field 4 mi (6.4 km) short of Don Mueang International Airport.
- 14 November 1992: Vietnam Airlines Flight 474, a Yakovlev Yak-40, VN-A449, originating in Ho Chi Minh City with 31 passengers on board crashed while approaching the Nha Trang Airport in a tropical storm, killing 30 people; the only survivor was Dutch passenger Annette Herfkens.
- 3 September 1997: Vietnam Airlines Flight 815, a Tupolev Tu-134, VN-A120, flying from Ho Chi Minh City to Phnom Penh, crashed on approach to Phnom Penh's Pochentong Airport, killing 65 of the 66 passengers on board.

=== Non-fatal incidents ===
- 24 January 1967: An Ilyushin Il-18D, VN-1590, crashed on landing at Nanning Wuxu Airport, China after the left main landing gear collapsed; all 17 on board were able to escape before the aircraft burned out. The aircraft was overloaded above its maximum landing weight.
- 12 January 1991: A Tupolev Tu-134, VN-A126, with 76 passengers on board crashed on final approach to Ho Chi Minh City. At 30 feet (9.1 meters) the Tupolev suddenly lost height and landed hard, touching down with the left main gear first. There were no casualties but the aircraft was entirely destroyed.
- 17 April 2006: Pilots flying a Boeing 777 from Hanoi to Frankfurt, operating as Flight 545, lost communication with ground control for more than an hour as the aircraft flew over Ukraine, Poland and the Czech Republic. After Czech air traffic controllers tried unsuccessfully to contact the plane for 25 minutes, the Czech Air Force sent two jet fighters to flank the airliner. The pilots then realized their mistake and turned the communications system on. The pilots were suspended by the airline and made to undergo more training before they could fly again.
- 21 October 2010: Flight 535, a Boeing 777-200ER, experienced severe turbulence over Russia during a Paris-bound flight. Of the 222 passengers and 15 crew members on board, 21 occupants were injured.
- 15 August 2026: A Boeing 787-9, VN-A867, operating as Flight 34 from Munich Airport to Hanoi, overran the runway during takeoff and became airborne beyond its clearway, striking approach-lighting equipment with its tail and main landing gear. The aircraft returned to Munich after more than two hours airborne, with no injuries among its 271 passengers and 16 crew. The aircraft was subsequently grounded at Munich pending technical assessment and investigation. A preliminary investigation found that brake inputs were recorded during the takeoff roll, during which the aircraft's airspeed remained nearly constant for approximately 18 seconds before it rotated below its calculated rotation speed. The cockpit voice recording of the takeoff was unavailable because it had been overwritten during the flight, exceeding the recorder's two-hour capacity. The cause of the braking remains under investigation.

=== Hijackings ===
- 28 October 1977: Vietnam Civil Aviation Flight 509, a Douglas DC-3, VN-C509, was hijacked by four armed Vietnamese hijackers seeking asylum in Singapore, en route from Ho Chi Minh City to Phu Quoc Island with 32 passengers on board. Two of the six crew members were killed and a third was wounded before the aircraft was forced to land in Singapore. The hijackers surrendered after negotiating with Singapore officials for five hours.
- 28 June 1978: Vietnam Civil Aviation Flight 501, a Douglas DC-4, VN-C501, was hijacked by four people who were equipped with a Makarov pistol, knives and a grenade. The hijackers had a gunfight with crew members and security guards. Three of the four hijackers were killed by grenades exploding and falling from the plane. The plane was written off a year after the hijacking.
- 7 February 1979: Vietnam Civil Aviation Flight 226, an Antonov An-24, VN-B226, was hijacked by six people, who were overpowered and killed by the security guard on board.
- 4 September 1992: Vietnam Airlines Flight 850, an Airbus A310-200, LZ-JXB, leased from Jes Air, with 127 occupants on board en route from Bangkok to Ho Chi Minh City, hijacked by Ly Tong, a former pilot in the Republic of Vietnam Air Force. He then dropped anti-communist leaflets over Ho Chi Minh City before parachuting out. Vietnamese security forces later arrested him on the ground. The aircraft landed safely, and no one on board was injured. He was released from a Hanoi prison in 1998.

== See also ==
- Air transport in Vietnam
- List of airlines of Vietnam
