= Ngô Thanh Vân =

Vietnamese actress (born 1979)

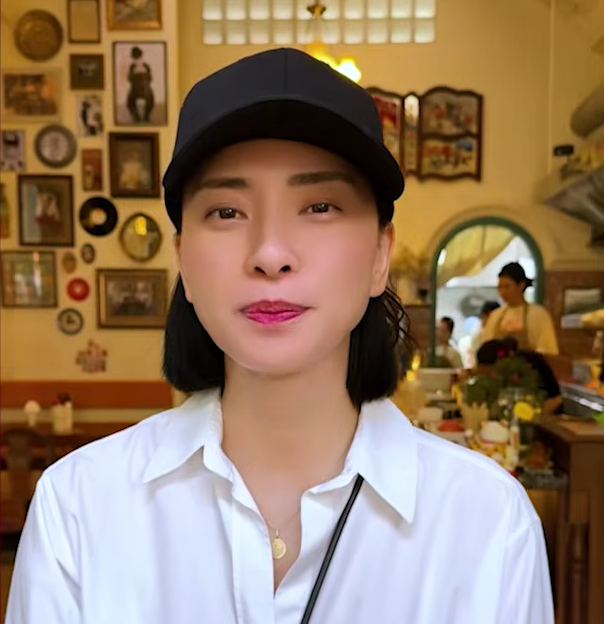
- Ngô Thanh Vân in 2024
- Born: 26 February 1979 (age 47); Cầu Kè, Vĩnh Long, Vietnam
- Other name: Veronica Ngo
- Occupations: Actress, singer
- Spouse: Huy Trần (m. 2022)
- Musical career
- Genres: Pop, dance

Ngô Thanh Vân (born 26 February 1979), also known as Veronica Ngô or by her initials NTV, is a Vietnamese-born Norwegian actress and singer.

== Early life and education ==
Ngô Thanh Vân was born on 26 February 1979 in Cầu Kè, Vĩnh Long, Vietnam. She is the youngest child with two older brothers. When Vân was 10, her family put her on a boat to leave the country following the end of Vietnam War. In 1990, Vân arrived in Norway as a boat refugee with an aunt.

== Career ==
=== Music career ===
In 2002, Vân transitioned into the music scene as a pop-dance singer with the help of producer Quốc Bảo. She recorded a duet album called Vườn tình nhân (Lovers' Garden) with established singer Tuấn Hưng.

The next year, again with the help of producer Quốc Bảo, Vân released her debut solo album, Thế giới trò chơi (Playworld), on 26 February. This album was a power pop-dance LP with the theme "NTV Virus". Two music videos were filmed for the album: "Thế giới trò chơi" and "Ngày tươi sáng", a cover version of jtL's "A Better Day", which was directed by Jackie Chen. These two videos were the first Vietnamese music videos to feature professional special effects and are listed among the most expensive Vietnamese music videos to date.

In 2004, Vân followed up with her second album, Bí ẩn vầng trăng (Mystery of the Moon), which featured a moon theme, on 15 March. Three videos were released from this album: "Bí ẩn vầng trăng", the cheerleader-themed "Vươn đến tầm cao" ("Reach for the Sky"), and the ballad "Khi nào em buồn" ("Whenever I'm Sad"), which was later covered by many artists including Mắt Ngọc, Minh Thuận, and Thanh Thảo.

On 5 September 2005, Vân released her third album, Con đường em đi (My Way). This album was produced by Vân herself and featured a collaboration with a group of producers called The Dreams. My Way featured multiple genres, from alternative rock to pop, R&B, and hip hop. She remixed the famous Trịnh Công Sơn song "Quỳnh Hương".

In autumn 2006, after a two-month break in America, Vân returned to Vietnam, and started recording her fourth album which she promised would be a dance anthem record. In October 2006, Vân premiered one of her new songs "I Won't Stop Loving You," a new collaboration with Quốc Bảo, on the final episode of 21st Century Woman on VTV. Due to heavy promotion for her film The Rebel, the album release was pushed back to the summer of 2007. In May 2007, Vân announced that the fourth album title would be Studio 68 and claimed that 68 was her lucky number. She released Studio 68 on 10 January 2008.

In 2006, Vân signed a contract to appear in the long-running music and comedy show Van Son, produced by Van Son Entertainment, an overseas Vietnamese music production company. She has since appeared in every Van Son DVD release to date.

During the first months of 2008, Vân began working on her next album Nước mắt thiên thần (Tears of Angel), while Studio 68 was awarded Most Creative Album in a monthly Album Vang prize.

=== Acting career ===
In 2004, Vân made her first international appearance in Rouge, a 13-part late night television series that aired on AZN Television. Rouge was produced by MTV Asia & MediaCorp Singapore and was broadcast widely in Asia and Australia. For the remainder of the year, Ngo was busy with the promotional campaign for Rouge throughout Asia and the recording of her third album. She was chosen as the favorite actress in Rouge on the MTV Asia website.

After the release of her album My Way, Vân continued acting, with many starring roles in films such as Saigon Love Story directed by Ringo Le, 2 in 1 directed by Dao Duy Phuc, and The Rebel directed by Charlie Nguyễn with Johnny Trí Nguyễn, the latter becoming (at that point) Vietnam's highest-grossing film of all time. Vân's performance was highly praised by both critics and the public, and earned her the Best Actress Award at the 15th Vietnam Film Festival. She was also nominated for Best Actress at the Golden Kite Awards for the second time. In the spring of 2007, Vân also starred in a new thriller called Ngôi nhà bí ẩn, which premiered in Vietnamese cinemas in November 2007.

2009 saw Vân once again starring beside Johnny Trí Nguyễn in the Chanh Phuong action movie Clash. She also opened her own talent agency called VAA.

In 2010, Vân competed as a contestant in the Vietnamese version of Dancing With The Stars. She finished as the winner of season one. After winning, Vân revealed that she would return to music in 2011. That autumn, she embarked on a national promotional tour.

In 2016, she appeared in Crouching Tiger, Hidden Dragon: Sword of Destiny and starred in Tấm Cám: The Untold Story.

In 2017, she played Paige Tico, the older sister to Rose Tico, in The Last Jedi. Although her screen time was brief, her character's death was an important act of self-sacrifice that affected the major characters in the film, especially Rose. Later in 2017, she played Tien, an Inferni elf enforcer working for Leilah, the main antagonist in the Netflix film Bright.

In 2019, she starred in Vietnamese action film Furie (Hai Phượng), which later became the highest grossing domestic film of all time in Vietnam. In 2020, she appeared in The Old Guard beside Charlize Theron and in Spike Lee's film Da 5 Bloods with Chadwick Boseman.

The same year, Vân was selected to jury the New York Asian Film Festival.

In 2025 she reprised her The Old Guard role in The Old Guard 2.

== Personal life ==
After the success of The Rebel, Vân publicly revealed her relationship with co-star Johnny Trí Nguyễn, which was rumored to have ended his marriage with Cathy Viet Thi, a singer on Van Son. The couple separated in 2015.

In March 2022, Ngo announced her engagement to businessman Huy Trần. She and Trần wed on 7 May 2022, at a ceremony held in the city of Da Nang.

== Discography ==
- 2002: Vườn tình nhân (Lovers' Garden), featuring Tuấn Hưng
- 2003: Thế giới trò chơi (Playworld)
- 2004: Bí ẩn vầng trăng (Mystery of the Moon)
- 2005: Con đường em đi (My Way)
- 2008: Studio 68 (Heaven: The Virus Remix)
- 2008: Nước mắt thiên thần (Tears of Angel)

== Filmography ==
=== Television ===
Year	Title	Notes
2002	Hương Dẻ	
2004	Rouge	credited as Thanh Van Ngo
2007-2009	Cô Gái Xấu Xí	Vietnamese version of Ugly Betty - Cameo
2010	Bước nhảy hoàn vũ	Vietnamese version of Dancing with the Stars - Winner
2013	Project Runway Vietnam	Judge

=== Film ===
Year	Title	Original title	Role	Notes
2006	2 in 1	2 trong 1	Như Lan	
2006	Saigon Love Story	Chuyện tình Sài Gòn	Tâm	Credited as Thanh Van Ngo (shot in 2004)
2007	The Rebel	Dòng máu anh hùng	Võ Thanh Thúy	Credited as Ngo Thanh Van
2007	Ngôi nhà bí ân		Trúc	Credited as Thanh Van Ngo
2009	Clash	Bẫy rồng	Trinh / Phoenix	Credited as Ngo Thanh Van
2011	Pearls of the Far East	Ngọc viễn đông	Sister	Credited as Thanh Van Ngo
2012	House in the Alley	Ngôi nhà trong hẻm	Thảo	
2013	Once Upon a Time in Vietnam	Lửa Phật	Ánh	Credited as Thanh Van Ngo
2015	The Lost Dragon	Ngày nảy ngày nay	Đan Nương	
2016	Bitcoin Heist	Siêu trộm	Kỳ	
2016	Crouching Tiger, Hidden Dragon: Sword of Destiny		Mantis	Credited as Thanh Van Ngo
2016	Tam Cam: The Untold Story	Tấm Cám: Chuyện chưa kể	The stepmother	Ngo's directorial debut
2017	The Tailor	Cô Ba Sài Gòn	Thanh Mai	Credited as Ngo Thanh Van
2017	Star Wars: The Last Jedi		Paige Tico	
2017	Bright		Tien	
2018	Going Home for Tet	Về quê ăn Tết	Đậu Xanh	
2019	Furie	Hai Phượng	Hai Phượng	Credited as Ngo Thanh Van
2020	Da 5 Bloods		Hanoi Hannah	
2020	The Old Guard		Quynh	Credited as Van Veronica Ngo
2022	The Princess		Linh	
2022	Furies	Thanh Sói	Jacqueline (Lin) Hoang	
2023	The Creator		Kami	
2025	The Old Guard 2		Quynh	

== Awards and nominations ==
Year	Association	Category	Work	Result	Ref.
2007	Vietnam Film Festival	Best Actress (Feature Film)	The Rebel	Won	
2009	Kite Awards	Best Leading Actress	Clash	Nominated	
2016	Kite Awards	Silver Kite (as producer)	Tam Cam: The Untold Story	Won	
2016	Kite Awards	Best Director	Tam Cam: The Untold Story	Nominated	
2019	Vietnam Film Festival	Best Actress (Feature Film)	Furie	Nominated	
2019	Vietnam Film Festival	Silver Lotus (as producer)	Furie	Won	
2019	Vietnam Film Festival	Golden Lotus (as producer)	Song Lang	Won	
2021	Screen Actors Guild Awards	Outstanding Performance by a Cast in a Motion Picture	Da 5 Bloods	Nominated	
