= Clash (2009 film) =

- Film poster
- Vietnamese: Bẫy Rồng
- Directed by: Le Thanh Son
- Written by: Johnny Tri Nguyen; Ho Quang Hung; Le Thanh Son
- Produced by: Jimmy Pham Nghiem; Johnny Tri Nguyen; Veronica Ngo
- Starring: Johnny Tri Nguyen; Veronica Ngo; Hoang Phuc; Lam Minh Thang; Hieu Hien
- Cinematography: Dominic Pereira
- Edited by: Ham Tran
- Music by: Christopher Wong
- Distributed by: Indomina Releasing; Vivendi Entertainment; Enervon; Chanh Phuong Films
- Release date: December 9, 2009
- Running time: 94 minutes
- Country: Vietnam
- Language: Vietnamese
- Budget: US$1.5 million

Clash (Vietnamese: Bẫy Rồng) is a 2009 Vietnamese action martial arts film directed by Le Thanh Son and starring Johnny Tri Nguyen and actress/singer Veronica Ngo. Johnny Tri Nguyen and Veronica Ngo had recently appeared together in the 2007 film The Rebel.

== Plot ==
Trinh codename Phoenix (Ngo Thanh Van), a female mob enforcer, must complete a series of organized crime jobs for her boss Hac Long (Hoang Phuc Nguyen) in order to win the release of her kidnapped daughter. She hires several mercenaries to help, including Quan dubbed Tiger (Johnny Tri Nguyen), who she becomes attracted to. Trinh and Quan's relationship becomes complicated as it becomes evident that their motivations are not the same.

== Cast ==
- Johnny Tri Nguyen as Quan / Tiger
- Veronica Ngo as Trinh / Phoenix
- Hoang Phuc as Hac Long
- Lam Minh Thang as Cang / Snake
- Hieu Hien as Phong / Ox
- Tran The Vinh as Tuan / Hawk
- Dang Trung Tuan as A Lu
- Nguyen Hau as A Thoong
- Ly Anh Kiet as Minh
- Tran Huu Phuc as Thanh
- Dien Thai Minh as Hai
- Tawny Truc Nguyen as Female assassin
- Alain Bruxelles as French gangster
- François de la Torre as French gangster
- Jérôme as French gangster
- Thomas Michel Meyer as French gangster
- David Minetti as French gangster
- Rémi Recher as French gangster
- Yann Williot as French gangster
