= Ringo Le =

American filmmaker

Ringo Le (Lê Quang Vinh) is an American filmmaker who is of Vietnamese descent. Ringo is a graduate of California State University, Los Angeles. After college, he was selected as a fellow to participate in the Film Independent Project:Involve film mentorship program. He has also participated in the CBS Director's Program at CBS Television City in Los Angeles.

Le directed the film Saigon Love Story, which was nominated for the Winds of Asia-Best New Asian Film Award at the Tokyo International Film Festival 2006. The film was an official selection at the Shanghai International Film Festival 2006. In addition, Saigon Love Story had a highly acclaimed, sold-out screening at VC FilmFest 2006. In 2013 he wrote, directed and produced Big Gay Love, which starred Jonathan Lisecki and Nicholas Brendon. Le is currently writing a script on the struggles of opening a restaurant in the local industry and is in the works on producing a film in the future.

In 2022, he wrote, directed and starred in his feature My Vietnam.

== Filmography ==
Year	Film	Director	Writer	Producer	Note
2006	Saigon Love Story	Yes	Yes	Yes	
2013	Big Gay Love	Yes	Yes	Yes	
	My Vietnam	Yes	Yes	No	
