= Fool for Love =

Fool for Love may refer to:

== Theatre, film and television ==
- Fool for Love (play), a 1983 play by Sam Shepard
  - Fool for Love (1985 film), a film adaptation of Shepard's play, directed by Robert Altman
- Fool for Love (2010 film), a romantic comedy film directed by Charlie Nguyễn
- "Fool for Love" (Buffy the Vampire Slayer), a 2000 episode of Buffy the Vampire Slayer
- "Fools for Love", a 2006 episode of House
- "Fools for Love" (Law & Order), an episode of Law & Order

== Music ==
- "Fool for Love" (song), a 2019 song by Nadine Coyle
- "Fool for Love", song by Sandy Rogers, soundtrack title song of Fool for Love
- "Fool for Love", 2009 single release by Sonia
- "Fool for Love", 2004 song by Tara Blaise
- "Fool for Love", 1987 song by Belinda Carlisle on her Heaven on Earth album
- "A Fool for Love", a song by Bryan Ferry from Frantic
- "Fool for Love", a song by Das Pop
- Fool for Love, an album by Paul Burch
- "Fool for Love", a song by Lee Hi from First Love
- "Fool for Love", a song by Lord Huron
- "Fool for Love", a song by DottyWomorr TikTok
