= Gayby =

- Directed by: Jonathan Lisecki
- Written by: Jonathan Lisecki
- Produced by: Amy Hobby; Anne Hubbell
- Starring: Jenn Harris; Matthew Wilkas; Mike Doyle; Anna Margaret Hollyman; Jack Ferver; Jonathan Lisecki
- Release date: March 12, 2012
- Country: United States
- Language: English

Gayby is a 2012 American romantic comedy-drama film directed by Jonathan Lisecki and starring Jenn Harris, Matthew Wilkas, Mike Doyle, Anna Margaret Hollyman, Jack Ferver and Jonathan Lisecki. It is based on the 2010 short film of the same name. It debuted on March 12, 2012, at the South by Southwest film festival.

== Plot ==
Jenn, a yoga instructor, and Matt, a comic book store worker, are best friends from college who are now single and in their 30s. In accordance with a pact they made in their youth, the two decide to have a baby ("gayby") together, though Jenn is straight and Matt is gay. Jenn's grandmother created a trust fund for her that she will be able to access if she has a child, so Jenn is confident that she and Matt will have the finances to care for it. Jenn states that she wants to have a baby through natural conception, so the two begin awkwardly having sex.

Meanwhile, Jenn is concerned with the stunted life she is living, treated as an underling at her yoga studio. Matt is recovering from a devastating breakup with his partner of six years, Tom, who is a rising comic book publisher. Matt finds himself struggling with getting back into the dating game and constantly avoiding awkward run-ins with Tom.

The two friends resolve to reinvigorate their dating lives and achieve their long-term goals—Jenn pushes the idea of innovative "warm" yoga classes at her studio, while Matt works on his own comic book, "Gayby"—about the adventures of a heroic gay baby—to pitch to a distributor. Both receive advice from friends about their goals and the pregnancy attempts—Jenn from her gay co-worker Jamie and her aggressive sister Kelly, who is in the process of adopting a child, and Matt from his dry, witty friend Nelson, who helps with their fertility treatments, having been a surrogate father himself.

After dating around, Jenn has a night of passionate sex with her boss's brother, Louis. Meanwhile, Matt meets a divorced, newly out gay father, Scott, who buys comic books at his store. The two begin a relationship, but Matt is frustrated at how slowly Scott wishes to proceed. Jenn and Matt are later thrilled when they learn Jenn is finally pregnant.

Jenn is furious to learn that Louis has a girlfriend and that he cheated on her with Jenn. In trying to defend himself, Louis reveals that he was single, also mentioning that their condoms broke during sex and that he thought Jenn knew and was okay with it. Jenn is devastated by the possibility that the child may not be Matt's after all. Jenn's boss, upon learning that her brother cheated on his girlfriend again with Jenn, angrily asks Jenn to take a leave of absence from the yoga studio.

While attending Matt's birthday party, Jenn hesitantly reveals that the child might be Louis's, which devastates Matt. He asks Jenn to return his apartment key and refuses to speak to her. Falling into a depression, Jenn is visited by Kelly, who tells her that her adoption failed. She offers to raise Jenn's baby instead, arguing that Jenn is not fit—either in lifestyle or career—to raise a child on her own, and that she will block the trust fund if necessary. Jenn argues that she will be able to raise the child and give it a great life, even if Matt never forgives her and she is forced to raise it alone. Satisfied that Jenn has what it takes, Kelly reveals that the adoption went through and that her offer was a ruse to bolster her sister's conviction.

Jenn returns to work and offers to buy into the yoga studio with some of her trust fund money, securing her future and furthering her career there. Enticed by the opportunity to split the responsibility of studio ownership with someone and seeing that Jenn's "warm" yoga has become an immense hit, her boss accepts, and they resume their friendship.

Nelson reads Matt's comic and convinces him that it is worth submitting to a publisher. Matt finds closure with Tom by finally speaking with him and asking him to show Gayby to one of his superiors. Tom happily agrees, stating that he is pleased to see Matt doing better. Though he is excited about this development, Matt is still depressed that the child may not be his. Nelson tells him that even if the child isn't his biologically, it is still his child because he and Jenn wanted to have it together, and that giving it a loving family is what's most important.

Jenn arrives at the comic book store to ask Matt's forgiveness and offers to raise the child with him one last time. Though silent at first, Matt relents and the two make up, preparing for the baby's arrival.

One year later, Matt's Gayby comic book is a success and he has furthered his relationship with Scott, who enthusiastically helps care for the baby. Jenn has begun a relationship with one of Matt's coworkers and stops by Matt and Scott's place to take care of the baby so they can spend a night by themselves. Unbeknownst to Matt, Scott is preparing to propose to him that evening. After Matt and Scott leave, Jenn cuddles with the baby and says, "You sure do look like your father," leaving the true identity of the baby's biological father unknown.

== Cast ==
- Jenn Harris as Jenn
- Matthew Wilkas as Matt
- Mike Doyle as Scott
- Jonathan Lisecki as Nelson
- Anna Margaret Hollyman as Kelly
- Jack Ferver as Jamie
- Louis Cancelmi as Louis
- Alycia Delmore as Linda, Jenn's boss
- Dulé Hill as Adam, Jenn's online date
- Charlie Barnett as Daniel, Matt's online date
- Joanne Tucker as Valerie, Jenn's antagonistic co-worker
- Sarita Choudhury as Dr. Ushma, Jenn's fertility therapist
- Adam Driver as Neil, Matt's co-worker
- Zach Shaffer as Tom, Matt's ex
- Alex Karpovsky as Peter

== Awards ==
Merlinka Festival - International Queer Film Festival, Belgrade, Serbia - Best Queer Film
