= Saigon Love Story =

- Film poster
- Directed by: Ringo Le
- Written by: Ringo Le
- Produced by: Tammy Le; Ringo Le
- Starring: Ngo Thanh Van; Duc Tien; Hứa Vĩ Văn; Yen Vy; Nguyen Chanh Tin
- Cinematography: Lam Lan Triet
- Distributed by: Celluloid Dragon Pictures
- Release dates: August 2006 (Asian Film Festival of Dallas); 14 February 2008 (Vietnam)

Saigon Love Story is Vietnam's first movie musical filmed entirely on location in Vietnam including Saigon and Phan Thiet. One of the first films independently produced outside of the Communist controlled film industry, overseas Vietnamese director Ringo Le decided to return to his birthplace to shoot his first feature film project. Saigon Love Story had a screening at VC FilmFest 2006. The film was an official selection into the Panorama selection at the Shanghai International Film Festival 2006 and was nominated for the "Winds of Asia - Best New Film Award" at the Tokyo International Film Festival 2006. The film traveled throughout the United States in sold-out roadshow tours to help bring attention to Vietnamese films and artists, but which also created political controversy. It was released on Valentine's Day in 2008 across Vietnam.

== Plot ==
Set in Vietnam during the 1980s, Danh is a young boy growing up in Saigon. Though he should help his mother sell noodles from a cart out of their home, he often sneaks out to buy cassettes.

One day, he inadvertently stumbles into a mysterious, beautiful street vendor named Tam, selling her cassette, Saigon Love Story. Intrigued about her music, Danh decides to buy the cassette, only to discover that it is blank. When Danh confronts Tam, he finds that she is penniless and unable to repay him, so she serenades him a song in her cassette. Enchanted, Danh finds a voice that has long been suppressed, a voice that is the ticket out of their impoverished life.

== Cast ==
- Veronica Ngo as Tam
- Hua Vi Van as Danh
- Thi Kim Xuan Chau as Ba Linh
- Thoai Yen Vy Dinh as Xuan
- Duc Tien Hoang as Liem
