= Searching for Paradise =

- Searching for Paradise, DVD cover
- Directed by: Myra Paci
- Written by: Myra Paci
- Starring: Susan May Pratt; Chris Noth; Jeremy Davies
- Cinematography: Teodoro Maniaci
- Distributed by: Sundance Channel
- Release date: December 31, 2001
- Running time: 88 minutes
- Country: US

Searching for Paradise is a 2001 film. It was written and directed by Myra Paci. It was Paci's first feature film.

Searching for Paradise is the story of Gilda Mattei, a girl overcome with grief over the death of her father. In trying to cope with her depression and uncertainty about her purpose in life, she embarks on a journey in which she endeavors to meet her favorite actor, Michael DeSantis, for whom she has developed an obsession.

== Cast ==
- Susan May Pratt as Gilda Mattei
- Chris Noth as Michael DeSantis
- Jeremy Davies as Adam
- John Pierson as Jim Johnson
- Michele Placido as Giorgio Mattei
- Laila Robins as Barbara Mattei
- Josef Sommer as Carl Greenslate
- Mary Louise Wilson as Evelyn Greenslate
- Samantha Buck as Andrea
- Jonathan Lisecki as Dave Pierce

Roger serbagi was in this film and was not credited

== Awards and festivals ==
Susan May Pratt won the award for best actress at the Milan Film Festival, and Teodoro Maniaci received the Hamptons International Film Festival cinematography award for the film.

The film was the opening attraction at the 2002 Boston Film Festival. It was also shown at the Austin Film Festival to critical acclaim, and was screened at the Hawaii International Film Festival, the Philadelphia Film Festival, the Rhode Island International Film Festival, and the San Diego Film Festival.
