= Big Gay Love =

- Movie poster
- Directed by: Ringo Le
- Written by: Ringo Le
- Produced by: Marisa Thu Le; Ringo Le; Quentin Lee; Nicholas Brendon; Edward Gunawan; Jonathan Lisecki
- Starring: Jonathan Lisecki; Nicholas Brendon
- Cinematography: Len Borruso
- Edited by: Augie Robles
- Music by: Steven Pranoto
- Production companies: Margin Films; Add Word Productions
- Distributed by: TLA Releasing
- Release dates: 22 June 2013 (Frameline Film Festival); 23 May 2014 (USA)
- Running time: 85 minutes
- Country: United States
- Language: English

Big Gay Love is a 2013 American comedy film written and directed by Ringo Le and produced by Quentin Lee and Marisa Le. The story centers on Bob (Jonathan Lisecki), an overweight gay man who overcomes discrimination and insecurity based on his looks to find love in the form of a chef named Andy (Nicholas Brendon).

The film was funded through Kickstarter and reached its goal on 23 March 2013.

== Cast ==
- Jonathan Lisecki as Bob
- Nicholas Brendon as Andy
- Ann Walker as Betty
- Ethan Le Phong as Chase (as Phong Truong)
- Todd Stroik as Aidan
- Ken Takemoto as Mr. Tran
- Drew Droege as Dan#1
- Amy Hill as Dr. Barrenbottom
- Jason Stuart as Dan#2
- Karina Bonnefil as Billy Gene
- Jeffrey Damnit as Rambo
- Harvey Guillén as Brian
- Ina-Alice Kopp as Lana
- Jesse James Rice as Tag
- Reed Schiff as jazz pianist

== Reception ==
Big Gay Love premiered at the Frameline Film Festival and then screened at Outfest, Philadelphia QFest, and the Palm Springs Cinema Diverse Film Festival where it was named Festival Favourite Film.

David Lewis of the San Francisco Chronicle praised Lisecki's performance, calling it "an emotionally naked performance"'.

Gary Goldstein of the Los Angeles Times considered: "There’s a sweet, funny, universal story hiding in the corners of the discombobulated comedy 'Big Gay Love'. Writer-director Ringo Le seems aware of his thematic intentions, but he's fuzzy on how to execute them. The result is a thin, wanly structured film that, after an OK start, stumbles about, filling time until its foregone conclusion."
