= Let Hoi Decide =

- Film poster
- Để Mai tính 2 Để Hội tính
- Directed by: Charlie Nguyen
- Written by: Thai Hoa; Vy Vincent Ngo; Charlie Nguyen; Martin Nguyen
- Produced by: Jenni Trang Le; Martin Nguyen; Jimmy Pham; Choi Yuno
- Starring: Thai Hoa
- Cinematography: Tal Lazar
- Edited by: Duc Nguyen
- Music by: Christopher Wong
- Production companies: CJ Entertainment; Chanh Phuong Films
- Release date: December 12, 2014
- Running time: 94 minutes
- Country: Vietnam
- Language: Vietnamese
- Box office: US$4.75 million

Let Hoi Decide (Vietnamese: De Mai tinh 2) is a 2014 spin-off film of De Mai tinh (2010), both of which were directed by Charlie Nguyen. Let Hoi Decide was released by CJ Entertainment, Chanh Phuong Films, Early Risers Media Group and Galaxy Studio on December 12, 2014, and distributed by CJ CGV Vietnam. The film stars Thai Hoa, Diem My 9x, Quang Su, Huy Khanh, Linh Son, Thu Trang, Hoang Phuc and Yaya Truong Nhi. It features Pham Huong Hoi's journey 4 years after the first film, in which he is torn between love and career.

The film received many mixed reviews from the press, in which they criticized the unwise plot full of not-so-funny comedy, though they still praised its entertainment purpose and Thai Hoa's acting skill. However, the LGBT community also heavily criticized this movie for being offensive toward the LGBT community in general, as well as for making profit from using homosexual stereotypes.

Let Hoi Decide grossed 5.7 billion Vietnam Dong worth of tickets in the first day of release. It ended up making 45 billion Vietnam Dong profit in its first week, soon to become one of the highest-grossing Vietnamese movies of all time by making 101 billion Vietnam Dong, before being defeated by Furious 7 a couple months later.

== Plot ==
After 4 years in the US, Hoi has been a successful man in real estate field. He decides to come back to Vietnam to conduct his ambitious plan which is to build the biggest mall ever Mega Malls,. Arriving at the airport, Hoi is picked up by his personal driver Hoang My.

Hoang My drives Hoi to check in at luxurious hotel. He is robbed and later saved by the painter named Nam. Hoi grows love interest with Nam while Nam is secretly in love with hotel manager Thu Le who is working at the hotel where Hoi will stay.

Hoi meets Truc who is business partner. However, Truc is arrested for drug dealing. Hoi's property is also sealed which leads him to leave the hotel, Hoi decides to temporarily stay at Hoang My's house.

His business faces bad lucks so Hoi decides to have a reading session with a fortuneteller who claims that he could only choose either love or money, which he chooses money. With Hoang My's help, Hoi tries to forget Nam.

Nam has successfully approached Thu Le to ask her to become his painting model, later Thu Le begins to like Nam although her father has intended to link her with another man named Son.

Hoi's sold his Rolex watch to buy all of Nam's paintings. Later, Hoi and Hoang My make an appointment with Nam at a coffee shop where Hoang My acts as a businessman who is fond of art while Hoi is Hoang My's bodyguard.

Being a bodyguard, Hoi stays in the same house with Nam as "to protect Nam while he's painting". Hoi intends to dig Nam's flaws in order to quickly forget him, however, in Hoi's view, Nam has no flaw.

Nam and Thu Le have much chemistry together. While Huong - housekeeper of Thu Le starts to like Hoi because she doesn't know that Hoi is gay.

Nam's ex-girlfriend wants to reconcile which makes Thu Le misunderstand and get mad at Nam. She thinks Nam has cheated on her, being in despair, she agrees to marry Son.

Later, Hoi also reveals everything for Nam, Nam decides to leave the city but Hoang My and Hoi chase him to the ferry to convince him to stay in order to cancel Thu Le's wedding since Son is not a good guy.

Three of them want to confront Truc about Son, as Truc has pretended to be sick to be sent to the hospital so he could be able to escape. While Hoang My and Nam are guarding for Hoi so Hoi could confront Truc. Unfortunately, Hoi and Truc are infected therefore they're unable to move and the chase begins.

Finally, Truc admits that Son is the head of drug dealing, later Son is arrested and the wedding is cancelled. Nam and Thu Le get married and live happily ever after. Hoi gets his properties back. At the end of the movie, Hoi is sight seeing at the beach and someone snatches his handbag, a young handsome man helps him retrieve it.

== Cast ==
  - Thai Hoa as Pham Huong Hoi - a successful businessman comes back to Vietnam to conduct on building Mega Malls but sparks love interest with a painter named Nam
    - At the end of the movie, the character Teo Em which is also portrayed by Thai Hoa in Little Teo also appears.
  - Quang Su as Nam - a painter and an employee of the hotel where Hoi stays in the movie, has love interest with Thu Le.
  - Diem My 9x as Thu Le - a hotel manager who is from a wealthy background.
  - Huy Khanh as Hoang My - who used to work as taxi driver but later hired by Hoi to be his personal driver, also the one who consults everything about love for Hoi.
  - Linh Son as Son - a wealthy young man who pursues Thu Le.
  - Thu Trang as Huong - Thu Le's housekeeper who likes Hoi without knowing that Hoi is gay
  - Hoàng Phúc as Thu Le's father - who forces Thu Le to get married Son.
  - Yaya Truong Nhi as Quyen - Thu Le's best friend who is the hotel receptionist with weird personality.
  - Huynh Anh Tuan as Truc
  - Kathy Uyen as Mai
  - Johnny Tri Nguyen as CD seller
  - Dustin Nguyen as Dung
  - Petey Majik Nguyen as Hoi's business partner
  - Leu Phuong Anh as a nurse
  - Lai Thanh Huong as bar employee
  - Andrea Aybar as Hoi's secretary
  - Thanh My as An
  - Phuong Trinh Jolie as Thao
  - Phi Phung as fortuneteller named Sau Mieu
  - Long Dep Trai as Trung - the owner of the painting shop
  - Hong Sap as the old lady
  - Thanh Binh as the police
  - Le Van An as import officer
  - David Pham as the jailer (with Hoi)

== Production ==
In early March 2014, it was confirmed that director Charlie Nguyen and actor Thai Hoa had already been in the making of the movie De Mai tinh's spin off with the title De Hoi tinh. This was the 6th collaboration after De Mai tinh (2010), Long Ruoi (2011), Cuoi ngay keo lo (2012), Bui doi Cho Lon (2013) and Teo Em (2013).

At the end of March 2014, the crew was still being in pre-production before starting to film, including set design and costume for the cast, beside, the cast had already had a meet up and rehearsed together. The movie started filming at the beginning of April and the process only took within 6 weeks.

The crew had a wrap party on May 22. Until November, despite full edited movie, they still decided to film more scenes in order to make a better ending. Thai Hoa claimed these final days of filming and changing the script in hurry caused him "depression", that he didn't even dare to watch the premiere.

Charlie chose actress Diem My for the character Thu Le, after 3 rounds of casting. He stated that this role "was supposedly portrayed by another actress whose figure is bigger" which caused him spending 3 days casting. However, Charlie claimed that she (Diem My) "is smart to absorb the character's personality" also "being creative in littlest details". As for Diem My, De Mai tinh is one of her favorite movies, she really admires Charlie Nguyen but "nervous and stressful" when she was filming with Thai Hoa.

Actress Thu Trang said that the scene where she took off her clothes to seduce Thai Hoa's character shocked her husband - actor Tien Luat, he also appeared during the filming of that scene and felt "annoyed" as he had witnessed that scene himself.

The official soundtrack of De Mai tinh is "Nhu mot loi hua" (Like A Promise) by singer Thao Trang, who had also performed "Angel In Me" - the OST of De Mai tinh. The song was released as online digital single on December 13, 2014, along with English version "Like A Promise". Both versions were composed by Phan Cong Thanh. The Vietnamese version was performed by Thao Trang in Toi toa sang show in December 20. Ngoc Lee from YAN News complimented the song "like a breeze in the movie" due to its soft melody.

== Release ==
The initial release date was supposed to be in November 2014, however the official release date was December 12, 2014. The premiere was 2 days before the official release at box office in Ho Chi Minh City.

At the start of October 2014, first poster was revealed along with other promotions. The old title "De Hoi tinh" with the poster portraying the character Hoi in new style with pink dyed hair, a shade and a mustache. A source said before release, the movie title was switched from De Hoi tinh to De Mai tinh 2 for commercial purpose maybe.

Actor Thai Hoa had predicted that the movie was unable to get 100 billion Vietnam Dong profit, "but let's see", he said.

With new title, De Mai tinh 2 attracted 71,766 audiences and earned 5,7 billion Vietnam Dong in first day, defeated Teo Em's record with 4 billion Vietnam Dong 4 years ago. Two days later, the movie continuously earned 7,5 billion Vietnam Dong and 8 billion Vietnam Dong with 200,000 audiences in total, which made Let Hoi Decide be the second highest grossing after the Vengeful Heart in 2014. In first week release, the movie eared 45 billion Vietnam Dong, until the second week marked in December 26, the total grossing was 70 billion Vietnam Dong. Early 2015, the movie broke all the records applying for both Vietnam movies and foreign movies since it earned 101 billion Vietnam Dong. Later, this record defeated by Furious 7.

CGV stated that the success of the movie came from entertainment purpose targeting with simple plot that anyone can understand.

== Reception ==
At the movie premiere night of Let Hoi Decide, actor Thai Hoa was so nervous to watch the movie with the press, whom he claimed that "trying to search for the tiniest flaws which pressure the screw", he decided to skip the movie premiere and had a coffee with Miss Vietnam 2010 runner up Vu Thi Hoang My - who was late to the premiere - in order to relive his stress. Unfortunately, since the release, the movie received mixed reviews from the press.

Ngoc Phuong from The Labor wrote that "Let Hoi Decide failed completely" regarding artistic perspective when inserting many ungraceful details along with other funny moments". She also criticized Thai Hoa's acting in Let Hoi Decide as same as his acting in Long Ruoi, Cuoi ngay keo lo and Teo Em. Another negative review from Phan Cao Tung from The Youth paper, he stated this movie was "one step back" after "not-so-surprising" Teo Em also by Charlie Nguyen, criticized Thai Hoa's acting was repeated over and over again.
