= Rouge (TV series) =

- Country of origin: Singapore
- Original language: English

Original release
- Network: Channel 5

Rouge is an English-language action/adventure television series from Singapore that aired on both Channel 5 and throughout Southeast Asia on MTV Asia in 2004 (both companies also co-produced the program). The show also aired in Australia (on MTV Australia) and the United States (on AZN Television).

The 13-part series follows a Southeast Asian all-girl rock band who are also high-tech special operatives working for a global crime-fighting organization (titled "The Organization"), as they take on a counter-espionage network known as "The Brotherhood."

== Cast ==
- Denise Laurel – Pat
- Mariel Rodriguez – Pam
- Desiree Ann Siahaan – Ling
- Ngo Thanh Van – Thủy
- Pierre Png – Hong
- Pamela Fields – Jazz
- Dao Ming Hso – Zeng
