= The Princess (2022 action film) =

2022 film directed by Le-Van Kiet

- Official release poster
- Directed by: Le-Van Kiet
- Written by: Ben Lustig; Jake Thornton
- Produced by: Toby Jaffe; Derek Kolstad; Neal H. Moritz
- Starring: Joey King; Dominic Cooper; Olga Kurylenko; Veronica Ngo
- Cinematography: Lorenzo Senatore
- Edited by: Alex Fenn
- Music by: Natalie Holt
- Production companies: 20th Century Studios; Original Film
- Distributed by: Hulu (United States); Disney+ (International)
- Release date: July 1, 2022
- Running time: 94 minutes
- Country: United States
- Language: English
- Budget: $26 million

The Princess is a 2022 American fantasy action comedy thriller film directed by Le-Van Kiet and starring Joey King in the title role with Dominic Cooper, Olga Kurylenko, and Veronica Ngo.

The film focuses on a strong-willed princess who fights to protect her family and save the kingdom when her suitor, a cruel sociopath she refuses to marry, intends on taking over the kingdom.

The Princess was released on Hulu on July 1, 2022. It received mixed reviews from critics, who praised King's performance, but criticized the screenplay.

== Plot ==
The film is set in a medieval realm ruled by a king and his queen, who have two daughters, the titular princess and her younger sister, Violet. With the queen's quiet approval, the princess was trained in the fighting arts by Linh, the niece of Khai, one of the king's advisors.

As the queen did not bear any sons, the king intends to wed the princess to Julius, the ruthless son of a royal diplomat, who despises the king's peaceful reign because of his belief that a "strong" king should rule with an iron fist. The princess leaves him at the altar, and as a result, Julius, his whip-wielding henchwoman Moira, and a band of brutal mercenaries have taken the castle by force, seizing the royal family and their retainers.

The princess is locked in the top of her castle's highest tower to await her forced wedding with Julius. When two mercenaries enter and prepare to rape her, she kills them and sets out to rescue her family. After the princess slays several mercenaries on her way, Julius and Moira are finally alerted and send their men after her. She evades her pursuers and meets up with Linh, who has escaped the castle's sacking and joins in her fight.

While trying to reach the sewers en route to the dungeons, the pair are forced to fight Moira, and Linh stays behind to stall her. The princess frees her family, but they and Linh are captured and brought before Julius. When she continues to resist him, he decides to cement his claim to the throne by marrying Violet instead. When the princess fights back, she is thrown into the castle's nearby lake to drown, while Linh and Violet escape through a secret door.

The princess escapes the fall with her life and sneaks back into the castle, where she reunites with Linh and Violet. The three equip themselves with weapons in a secret storeroom, and the princess and Linh fight the mercenaries, while Violet frees Khai. However, Violet is discovered and captured, and Linh is wounded while fighting Julius, but the princess kills Moira and engages Julius in single combat. Weakened and on her knees, she bides her time while he gloats before preparing to kill her. At the right moment, she wrests Julius' sword away and decapitates him. Finally convinced of his daughter's strength and dedication, the king makes the princess the heir to the throne and decrees that women of the kingdom are allowed to choose their own way in life.

== Cast ==
- Joey King as the princess
  - Allegra du Toit as the young princess
- Dominic Cooper as Julius
- Olga Kurylenko as Moira
- Veronica Ngo as Linh
- Ed Stoppard as the king
- Alex Reid as the queen

Additionally, Katelyn Rose Downey appears as Violet, the princess's sister; Kristofer Kamiyasu plays Khai, Linh's uncle; and Fergus O'Donnell appears as Kurr, one of Julius' soldiers. Antoni Davidov and Todor Kirilov appear as the Merc Leader and the Heavy Merc, respectively.

== Production ==
The film's original logo

On October 30, 2020, 20th Century Studios acquired the rights to Ben Lustig and Jake Thornton's spec script The Princess, with Hulu set to distribute. It was conceived as a streaming title from the outset. Neal H. Moritz's Original Film co-produced the film with 20th Century and Derek Kolstad. Joey King, Lustig, and Thornton served as executive producers. On November 12, 2021, Le-Van Kiet was announced as the film's director. The screenplay for The Princess was written by Ben Lustig and Jake Thornton.

== Release ==
On November 12, 2021, it was announced that The Princess was scheduled for release in the summer of 2022, with plans for its debut on Hulu in the United States. It was intended to be released on Disney+ internationally on Star and on Star+ in summer 2022 as well.

On April 12, 2022, the release date was confirmed as July 1, 2022, with the film also slated to premiere on Star and Star+ in Latin America in July 2022. The film was removed from Disney+ and Hulu on May 26, 2023. It remains available through digital video-on-demand services.

== Reception ==
=== Audience viewership ===
Whip Media, which tracks viewership data for the more than 21 million worldwide users of its TV Time app, reported that The Princess was the third most-streamed movie in the U.S. during the weekend of July 1 to July 3. It subsequently ranked fourth during the weekend of July 8 to July 10.

=== Critical response ===
On the review aggregator website Rotten Tomatoes, the film holds an approval of 62% based on 86 critics, with an average rating of 5.5/10. The website's critics consensus reads, "Joey King is a credible action star in Princess, but she deserves a better kingdom than this uneven vehicle that gets weighed down by a clunky script and shabby production values." Metacritic, which uses a weighted average, assigned the film a score of 43 out of 100, based on 18 critics, indicating "mixed or average reviews".

Scott Mendelson of Forbes found The Princess to be a solid action movie and complimented its concept, drawing some comparisons with the Die Hard film franchise, while praising Joey King's performance and the action sequences. Jesse Hassenger of Consequence found the movie funny and praised its premise, applauded Le-Van Kiet's direction, stating the director provides a lot of action sequences across a frenetic direction, while saying the performances of the actors manage to be forceful. Andy Crump of Paste rated the movie 7.4 out of 10, praised the performances of the cast members, saying Joey King provides a fierce performance across the film, complimented the choreography though the action sequences, and said Le-Van Kiet, Ben Lustig, and Jake Thornton succeed to provide an action movie with a female lead challenging patriarchy across the direction and the script.

Jennifer Green of Common Sense Media rated the film three out of five stars, praised the depiction of positive messages and role models, citing female-empowerment and courage, and complimented the diverse representations across the characters and their origins. Brian Tallerico of RogerEbert.com rated the movie two out of four stars, said the performance of Joey King manages to be the best element of the film, and found some of the action sequences entertaining, but stated the movie fails to provide a script that is sufficiently creative.

=== Accolades ===
Joey King was nominated for Best Actress in an Action Movie at the 2023 Critics' Choice Super Awards.
