= Charlie Nguyễn =

Vietnamese-American filmmaker

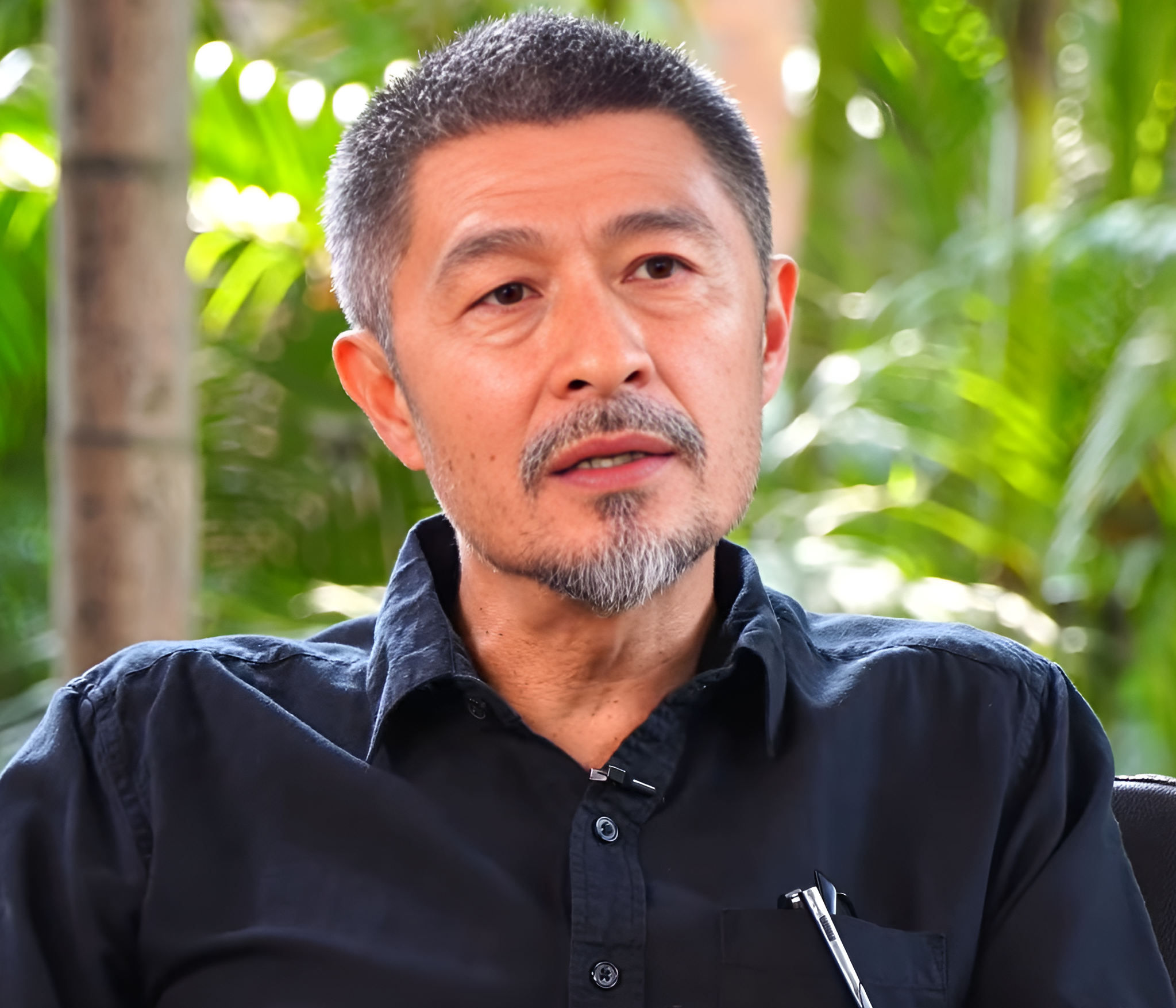
Charlie Nguyen in 2026

Charlie Nguyễn, Vietnamese name is Nguyễn Chanh Truc (born September 25, 1968), is Vietnamese–American film director, screenwriter and producer.

He is the older brother of actor Johnny Tri Nguyen, he and Johnny with comedian Van Son are nephews of actor Nguyen Chanh Tin.

== Biography ==
In 1992, Nguyen started his own production company called Cinema Pictures in California, which was later evolved into Chanh Phuong Films in 2004 in Vietnam.

His film credits include Hung Vuong the 18th/Thời Hùng Vương 18 (1994, writer/director), Chances Are/Vật Đổi Sao Dời (2002, writer/director), Finding Madison (2005, co-producer), Fool For Love/Để Mai Tính (2009, director), the award-winning hit release by The Weinstein Company, The Rebel/Dòng Máu Anh Hùng (2006, co-writer/co-producer/director), The Prince and the Pagoda Boy/Khát Vọng Thăng Long (2010, writer), the Vietnam box office record comedy - Big Boss/Long Ruồi (2011, director), Love Puzzles/Cưới Ngay Kẻo lỡ (2012, writer/director), Little Teo/Tèo Em (2013, writer/director), Vietnam banned martial arts gangster - Cho Lon/Bụi Đời Chợ Lớn (2013, writer/director), Vampire Diary (2014, additional action director), Fool For Love 2/Để Mai Tính 2 (2014, director/co-writer) and Crouching Tiger Hidden Dragon 2 (2015, producer), Fanatic/Fan Cuồng (2016, writer/director), Jailbait/Em Chưa 18 (2017, producer/co-writer), Daddy Issues/Hồn Papa, Da Con Gái (2018, producer), My Mr. Wife/Chàng Vợ Của Em (2018, co-writer/director) and What We Forgot to Remember/Người Cần Quên Phải Nhớ (2020, producer/story by).

He's currently in development on several feature films and miniseries, as well as directing commercials in Saigon.

== Filmography ==
Year	Title	Role
2020	What We Forgot to Remember (Người Cần Quên Phải Nhớ)	Producer
2019	My Mr. Wife (Chàng Vợ Của Em)	Director, Co-writer
2018	Daddy's Issue (Hồn Papa Da Con Gái)	Producer
2017	Jailbait (Em Chưa 18)	Producer, Co-writer
2017	Crouching Tiger Hidden Dragon 2	Producer
2016	Fanatic (Fan Cuồng)	Writer, director, Co-editor
2014	Fool for Love 2 (Để Mai tính 2)	Writer, director, editor
2014	Vampire Academy	Action Unit Director
2013	Little Teo (Tèo em)	Writer, director, editor
2013	Cho Lon (Bụi đời Chợ Lớn)	Writer, director, editor
2012	Love Puzzles (Cưới ngay kẻo lỡ)	Writer, director, editor
2011	Big Boss (Long Ruồi)	Director
2010	Fool for Love (Để Mai tính)	Director, editor
2010	City of the Rising Dragon (Khát Vọng Thăng Long)	Writer
2007	The Rebel (Dòng máu anh hùng)	Writer, director, producer, editor
2002	Chances Are (Vật đổi sao dời)	Writer, director, producer, editor
1994	King Hung Vuong 18th (Thời Hùng Vương 18)	Writer, director, producer, editor

== Personal life ==
Nguyen is married to Diane Nguyen and father to the U.S. national karate champion, Jasmine Nguyen. He is the brother of actor Johnny Trí Nguyễn.
