= Johnny Trí Nguyễn =

Vietnamese-American actor and stuntman

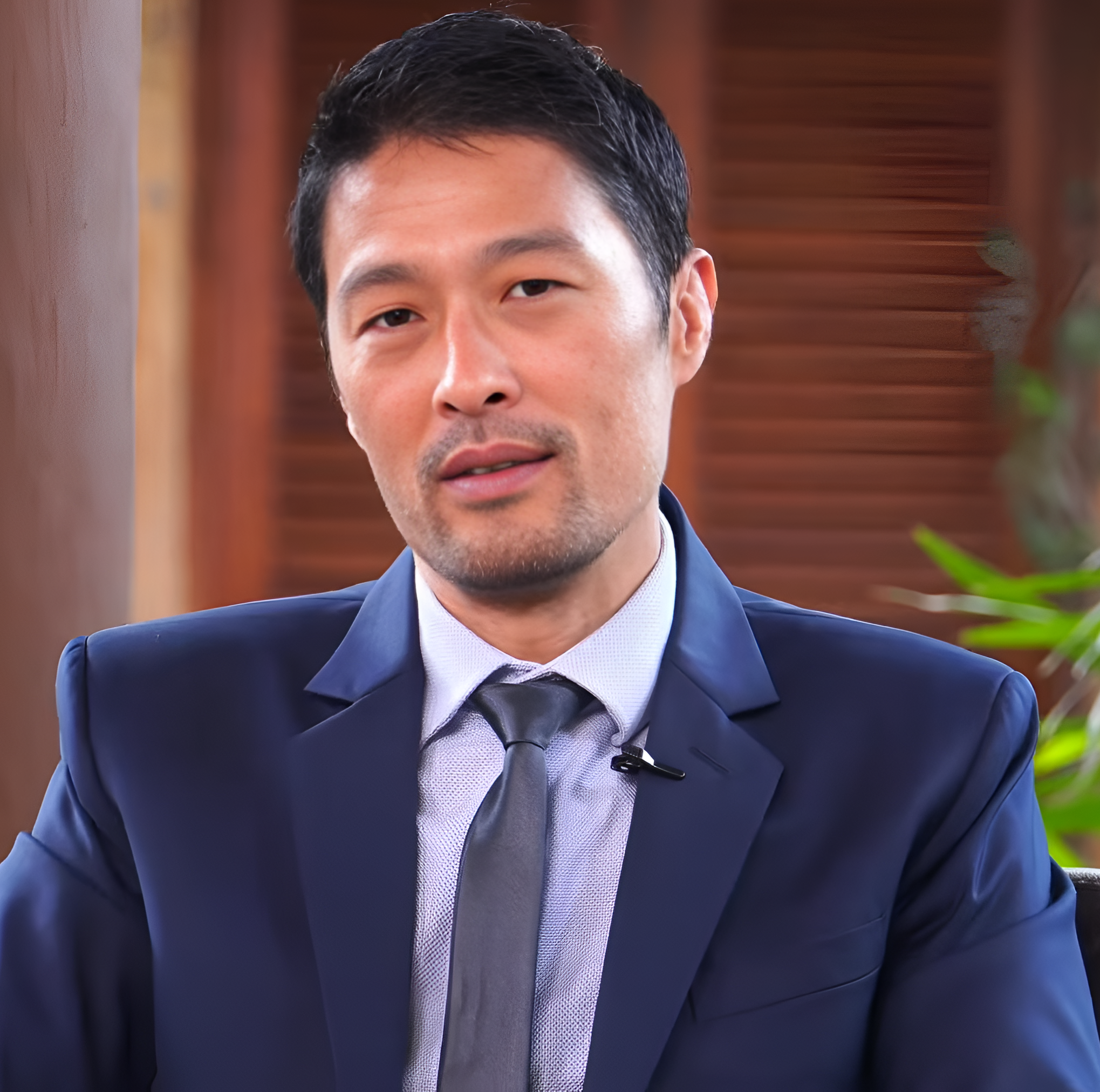
- Nguyen in 2026
- Born: Nguyễn Chánh Minh Trí; January 16, 1974 (age 52); Bình Dương, South Vietnam (present–day Vietnam)
- Nationality: Vietnamese; American
- Years active: 1994–present

Other information
- Occupation: Martial artist; action choreographer; stuntman
- Children: 2

Johnny Trí Nguyễn (Vietnamese name Nguyễn Chánh Minh Trí, born January 16, 1974) is a Vietnamese American martial artist, actor, action choreographer and stuntman who is mainly active in the Vietnamese film industry.

== Early life and career ==
Born in Bình Dương and raised in Trung An, Mỹ Tho, Nguyễn and his family immigrated to the United States of America when he was 9. He competed as a martial artist on the U.S. national team and then transitioned into a career as a stuntman in Hollywood, working on films such as Spider-Man 2 and Jarhead.

Nguyễn later returned to Vietnam and starred in The Rebel, a period martial arts film released in 2007 and directed by his brother Charlie Nguyễn. It was a massive success in Vietnam, garnering unprecedented attention for a locally made film. Nguyễn followed The Rebel by starring in a steady stream of hit films, many of which were directed by his brother, including Clash in 2009, Để Mai tính in 2010 and Tèo Em in 2013, all of which broke box office records at the time of release. In a controversial decision, Vietnamese censors banned Nguyễn's 2013 action film Bui Doi Cho Lon for its violent content.

Besides his work in Vietnamese films, Nguyễn has had supporting roles in major films from Thailand (Tony Jaa's Tom-Yum-Goong) and India (7 Aum Arivu and Irumbu Kuthirai).

== Filmography ==
Year	Title	Role	Notes
2002	We Were Soldiers	Young NVA Lieutenant	
2003	Cradle 2 the Grave	Ling's Henchman	
2003	Buổi sáng đầu năm	Tuấn	
2004	Spider-Man 2		Stunts and Stunt double: Tobey Maguire
2004	Max Havoc: Curse of the Dragon	Quicksilver	
2004	Ella Enchanted	Red Knight	
2005	Color Blind	Kato	
2005	Demon Hunter	Guard #5	
2005	Tom-Yum-Goong (The Protector or Người bảo vệ)	Johnny	
2006	Hồn Trương Ba, da hàng thịt	Trương Ba	
2007	The Rebel (Dòng máu anh hùng)	Cường	
2007	Sài Gòn nhật thực	Trọng Hải	
2008	Kiss of the Death (Nụ hôn thần chết)	Thần chết Du	
2009	Power Kids (5 Huajai Hero)	Pada	
2009	Clash (Bẫy rồng)	Quân / Hổ	
2010	Để Mai tính	Anh chàng đồng tính Johnny	
2011	7 Aum Arivu (Seventh Sense)	Dong Lee	Indian Tamil/Telugu-language film
2012	Cưới ngay kẻo lỡ	Hồ Sơn	
2012	Chuộc tội	Chưa có thông tin	
2013	Bụi đời Chợ Lớn	Phong bụi	
2013	Tèo em	Tí	
2014	Irumbu Kuthirai (Iron Horse)	Don Stoney	Indian Tamil Language film
2014	Để Mai tính 2	Peddler	
2016	Fanatic (Fan cuồng)	Gia Nghị	
2017	Babysitters at Work (Vú em tập sự)	Trường	
2020	Da 5 Bloods	Vinh	Nominated—Screen Actors Guild Award for Outstanding Performance by a Cast in a Motion Picture
