= Fool for Love (2010 film) =

- Film poster
- Để Mai tính
- Directed by: Charlie Nguyễn
- Written by: Dustin Nguyễn
- Produced by: Dustin Nguyễn; Irene Trịnh
- Starring: Dustin Nguyen; Kathy Uyen; Thái Hòa; Charlie Nguyen; Bùi Văn Hải; Maryline Tâm Võ
- Cinematography: Dominic Pereira
- Edited by: Charlie Nguyễn; Ham Tran; Thắng Vũ
- Music by: Christopher Wong
- Production company: Wonderboy Entertainment
- Distributed by: EarlyRisers Media Group
- Release date: April 23, 2010
- Running time: 95 minutes
- Country: Vietnam
- Language: Vietnamese
- Box office: 18 billion VND

Fool for Love (Vietnamese: Để Mai tính) is a romantic comedy film directed by Charlie Nguyễn released in 2010. It tells the story of Dung (Vietnamese: Dũng) (Dustin Nguyễn), a laid back employee at a 5-star hotel who is interested in Mai (Kathy Uyên), a Vietnamese American aspiring singer. He is hired by Hoi (Vietnamese: Hội) (Thái Hòa) as a personal assistant, which allows him to go to Nha Trang to pursue Mai.

In 2014, a spin-off film Để Mai Tính 2: Let Hoi Decide was released, focusing on Hoi.

== Plot ==
Dung (Dustin Nguyễn) is a low-level employee at a hotel in Saigon (Ho Chi Minh City) who is kind to those around him and a hopeless romantic. Mai (played by Kathy Uyên) is an Overseas Vietnamese lounge singer searching for her break. When they have a chance meeting, Mai is charmed by Dung's ability to quickly solve situations with cleverness and a smile. Dung is dismayed to find out that Mai is being pursued by a wealthy businessman named Antoine (Charlie Nguyễn), who has offered Mai assistance with her singing career in exchange for a romantic relationship.

Dung meets Hoi, a wealthy, gay businessman, and accepts an offer to be a well-paid personal assistant in the hopes of gaining enough money to convince Mai to reconsider. Dung agrees to accompany Hoi to Nha Trang, knowing Mai would be performing there and with the hope he can feign wealth with Hoi's gifts and property. Meanwhile, Hoi pushes the boundaries of his arrangement with Dung, hoping to start their own romantic relationship after breaking up with his ex-boyfriend, Chau.

== Cast ==
- Dustin Nguyễn as Dũng
- Kathy Uyen as Mai
- Thái Hòa as Hội
- Charlie Nguyen as Antoine
- Bùi Văn Hải as Minh
- Maryline Tâm Võ as Ánh
- Annie Huỳnh Anh as Vân
- Leon Lê as Sơn
- Trần Trung Lĩnh as Trí
- Đào Duy Tân as Thành
- Bình Minh as Antoine's assistant
- Johnny Trí Nguyễn as Johnny
- Nguyễn Hậu as the boatman
- Ngụy Thanh Lan as the secretary
- Trương Thế Vinh as thr Bar Owner
- Dominic Pereira as the Hotel Customer
- Tuyền Mập as the woman in the restroom

== Production ==
The movie was filmed in three cities of Vietnam are Ho Chi Minh City, Nha Trang and Hanoi; with three hotels appeared respectively are Mövenpick Hotel Saigon (now is Eastin Grand Hotel Saigon), Sheraton Nha Trang Hotel & Spa and Mövenpick Hotel Hanoi Centre. It would be the first big budget movie directed by an Overseas Vietnamese director. The movie is thought to be one of the first films in a new wave of glossy, mainstream Vietnamese cinema.

== Release ==
The film was released in Vietnam on April 23, 2010. The movie was released to theaters in the United States on September 10, 2011. After its summer run, it would stand as Vietnam's biggest box office hit for a movie officially produced in Vietnam, grossing 18 billion VND.

== Reception ==
Thủy Linh from Thanh Nien commended the summer release for its lighthearted comedy and allowing the audience to have uncomplicated laughs. Jade Hidle for DVAN remarked on the movie's depiction of a modern Vietnam, forgoing references to the country's past, "the film allowed me to experience a welcomed sense of relief that positive movies can be made about and in Việt Nam."

=== Depiction of Sexual Orientation ===
In their review for Thanh Niên, Thuy Linh commended Thái Hòa for portraying his gay character as motivated by love as much as the other characters. Nguyễn Tấn Hoàng for Korientation saw the character of Hoi as part of a burgeoning trope, in which Vietnamese cinema depicted gay characters as "affluent, cosmopolitan, and modern, these characters’ bóng eroticism is painted as contagious, addictive, and morally corrupt." Lee Ngo for DVAN asked "Is Thai Hoa’s Hoi an offensive caricature of subjectivity, or is he simply a character who should be lauded for his courageous self-expression?"

In Nguyễn Tấn Hòang's 2018 article "Fooled by Love: Việt Kiều Intimacy in Charlie Nguyen's Để Mai Tính (2010), they argue that the depiction of Hoi as queer and as an Overseas Vietnamese is inextricably linked in the character's portrayal.

== Sequels ==
In 2014, Thái Hòa reprised his Hoi character in De Mai Tinh 2: Let Hoi Decide. The storyline was a continuation to the film and centering about Hoi. Some scenes of the first movie are used as Hoi's recall.
