= Nicholas Brendon =

American actor, artist and writer (1971–2026)

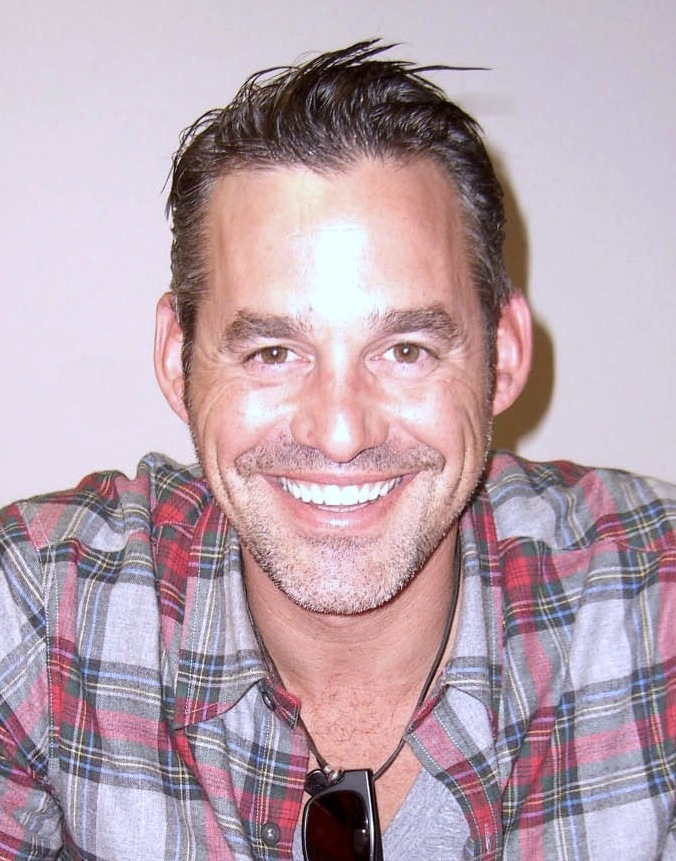
- Brendon in 2010
- Born: Nicholas Brendon Schultz; April 12, 1971; Los Angeles, California, U.S.
- Died: March 20, 2026 (aged 54); Greencastle, Indiana, U.S.
- Occupations: Actor; artist; writer
- Years active: 1993–2025
- Spouses: Tressa DiFiglia (m. 2001; div. 2006) Moonda Tee (m. 2014; div. 2015)
- Website: nickybrendon.com

Nicholas Brendon Schultz (April 12, 1971 – March 20, 2026) was an American actor, artist, and writer. He was best known for playing Xander Harris in the television series Buffy the Vampire Slayer (1997–2003) and Kevin Lynch in Criminal Minds (2007–2014).

Brendon continued to work steadily as an actor, with recurring roles on television and starring roles in independent films such as Coherence and Big Gay Love (both 2013). He also pursued visual art, exhibiting and selling his paintings and photography. Brendon struggled for many years with alcoholism and faced a series of legal issues, including multiple arrests and convictions for vandalism, theft, and domestic violence. He died in his sleep due to natural causes at age 54.

== Early life ==
Nicholas Brendon Schultz was born on April 12, 1971, in Los Angeles, California. He was an identical twin. His mother was a talent agent and his father a business consultant.

As a child, Brendon hoped to become a professional baseball player, but he later said he "lost the passion for it" at age 20. He attended Chatsworth High School in the San Fernando Valley.

He turned to acting as a way to manage a stutter that had first appeared when he was seven or eight. The condition made him reluctant to speak or interact with strangers, and he stated that he did not begin dating until his early 20s. Brendon described working through his stutter with daily tongue-twisters and deliberate pacing, noting that "patience and persistence have paid off." He later worked with the Stuttering Foundation of America, which approached him around 2001, and served as honorary chairperson for National Stuttering Awareness Week in May of that year.

Brendon left acting after two years, stating that he "couldn't stand the politics in Hollywood". He subsequently returned to school to study medicine, though he did not complete the program, and held a series of jobs, including plumber's assistant, veterinary janitor, day-care counselor, waiter, and production assistant on the television series Dave's World.

== Career ==
=== Buffy the Vampire Slayer ===
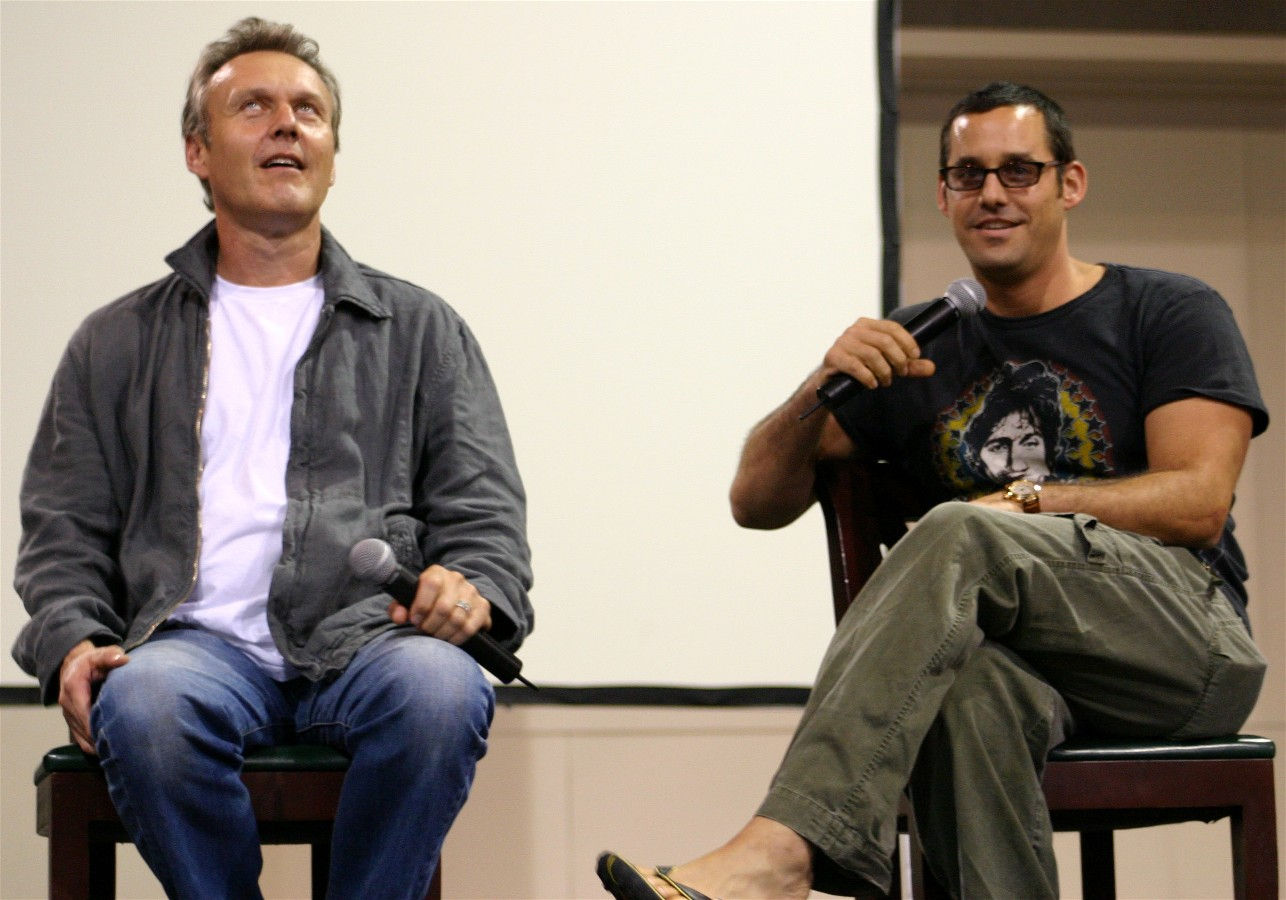
Brendon (right) with Anthony Head at the 2004 Oakland Super SlayerCon

Brendon said that at age 25 he had hit "rock bottom": his girlfriend had left him, he was working as a waiter and struggling to pay his rent, and he had nearly given up on finding steady acting work. After he bought the wrong kind of Pop-Tarts for his co-workers, his boss fired him and told him, "You should be acting." He was drawn to the pilot script for Buffy the Vampire Slayer because of how much he had disliked high school. He later said that the character of Xander Harris was based on Joss Whedon's own high‑school experiences, which he believed explained why the character "gets all the good lines". Brendon signed with a manager and was cast as Xander three months later. The role became his best‑known work. Brendon portrayed Xander for seven seasons, appearing in all but one of the show's 144 episodes. For his performance, he received Saturn Award nominations in 1998 and 1999 for Best Genre TV Actor, and in 2000 for Best Supporting Actor. He remained active within the Buffy fan community, regularly attending conventions, and contributed to the development of Xander's character in the franchise's follow-up comic books.

In 2014, he took part in a writers' summit for the Buffy the Vampire Slayer comics, alongside Joss Whedon, Jane Espenson, Drew Greenberg, Andrew Chambliss, and incoming writer Christos Gage. He contributed to Buffy the Vampire Slayer Season Ten, working on stories focused on Xander.

=== Other work ===
After Buffy ended in 2003, Brendon joined the cast of the Fox pilot The Pool at Maddy Breakers, though the network did not pick up the series. In 2004, he co-starred in the ABC Family film Celeste in the City. The following year, he returned to Fox as part of the cast of Kitchen Confidential, based on Anthony Bourdain's memoir. Thirteen episodes were produced, but the series was canceled on December 9 after the fourth episode aired due to low ratings.

In 2006, Brendon had a recurring role as a voice actor in the animated series American Dragon: Jake Long. That same year, he reunited with former Buffy co-star Charisma Carpenter in the ABC Family film Relative Chaos.

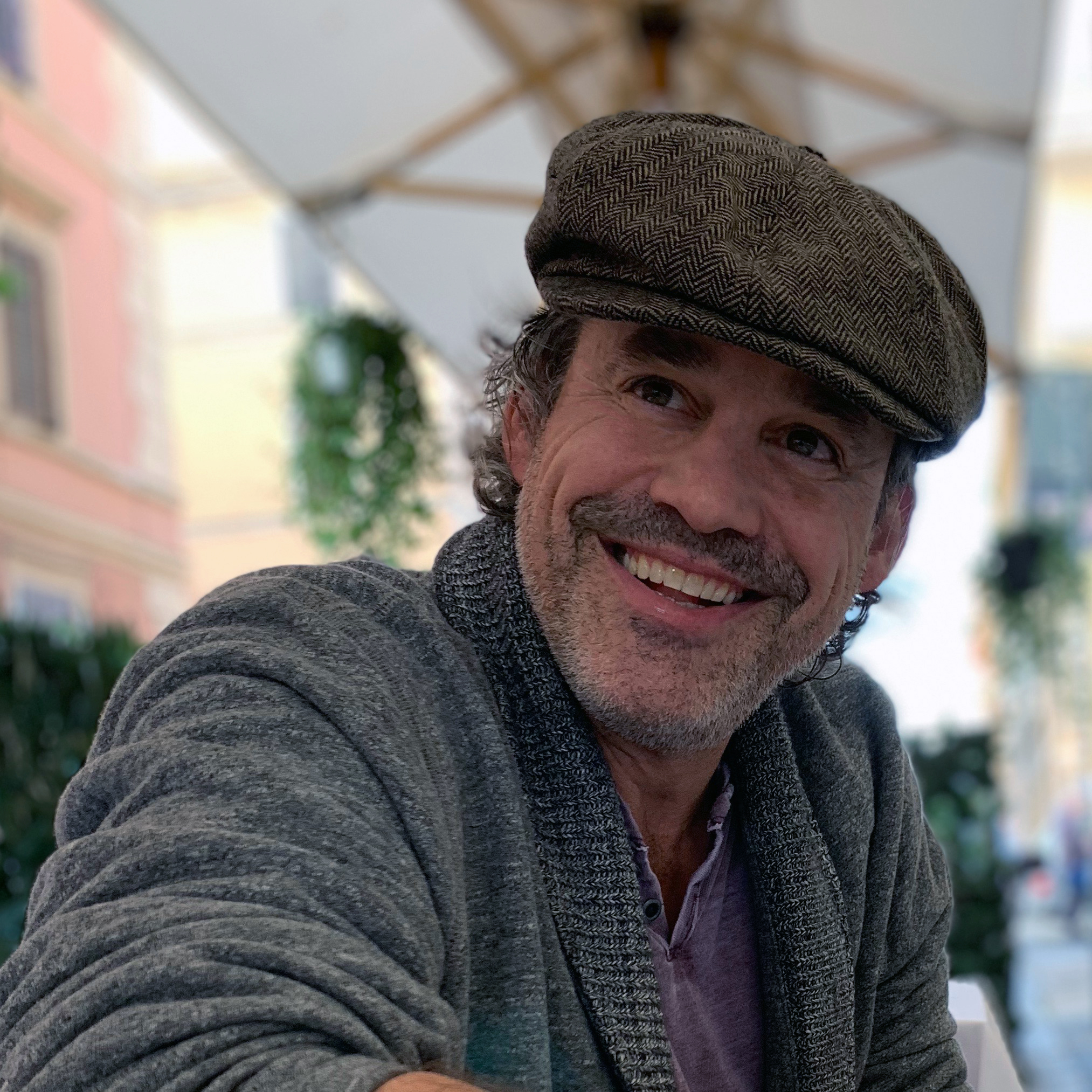
Brendon in 2018

From July 26 to August 30, 2006, Brendon co-starred with Noah Wyle in the play Lobster Alice at the Blank Theatre Company in Los Angeles. He later appeared in the Blank Theatre's annual Young Playwrights Festival, as well as its productions of The SantaLand Diaries (November – to December 20, 2009), and Why Torture Is Wrong, and the People Who Love Them.

In 2007, Brendon began a recurring role on Criminal Minds as FBI technical analyst Kevin Lynch. He appeared in episodes across subsequent seasons through the 10th season.

In late 2010, he launched the webcomic Very Bad Koalas, co-created with animation director and producer Steve Loter. The comic follows two sheltered koalas on the run from the law in a 1958 Cadillac El Dorado.

Also in 2010, Brendon appeared in a four-episode arc on ABC's Private Practice as Lee McHenry, a mentally disturbed man who assaults Charlotte King.

He later had a recurring role in Untitled Web Series About a Space Traveler Who Can Also Travel Through Time, appearing alongside Sylvester McCoy, Robert Picardo, Mayim Bialik, Chase Masterson, Rosearik Rikki Simons, and Carrie Keranen.

== Personal life ==
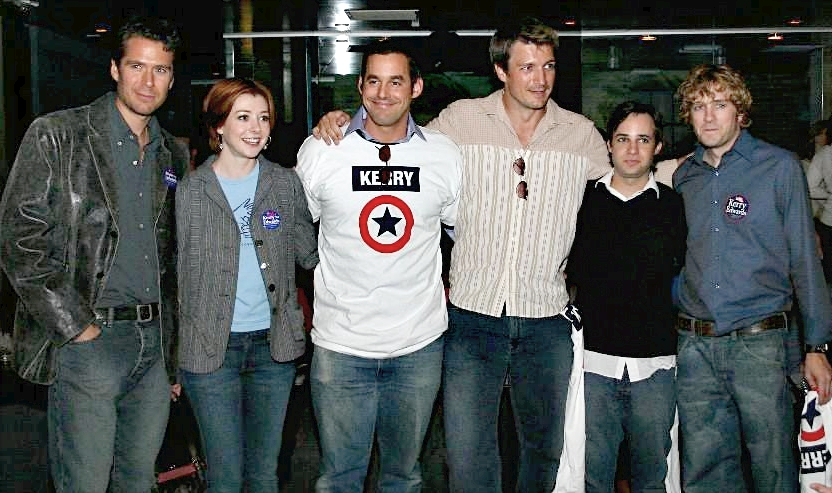
(From left to right) Alexis Denisof, Alyson Hannigan, Brendon, Nathan Fillion, Danny Strong and Tom Lenk at a John Kerry fundraiser

Brendon was married to actress Tressa DiFiglia from 2001 to 2006.

Brendon enjoyed painting and photography and sold his own original artwork.

At a Buffy fan convention in Cleveland, Ohio, in 2004, Brendon announced that he had voluntarily entered rehabilitation for alcoholism.

Brendon married Moonda Tee in Las Vegas in 2014, one week after proposing. He announced their separation on social media five months later, in February 2015. Tee claimed in a video posted to social media that the separation occurred because Brendon had cheated on her.

=== Legal issues ===
In March 2010, Brendon was tased and arrested for felony vandalism by Los Angeles police, who confronted him in response to a call about an intoxicated individual. He allegedly swung his fists at the officers and attempted to run away. He was later charged with four misdemeanors, including one count of resisting arrest, two counts of battery against a police officer, and one count of vandalism. In May 2010, he again checked himself into rehabilitation to address his addiction to alcohol and sleeping pills. Brendon pleaded no contest to all four charges in June 2010 and received a one-year suspended jail sentence, 36 months of probation, and 10 days of community service.

Brendon was arrested on October 17, 2014, in a Boise, Idaho, hotel lobby for misdemeanor charges of malicious injury to property and resisting or obstructing officers. He later issued a public apology, calling the incident "embarrassing" and attributing it to drinking alcohol while taking pain medication for a knee problem.

Brendon was arrested on suspicion of grand theft by Fort Lauderdale police in February 2015 after he reportedly trashed his hotel room and refused to pay the bill. He was arrested again in March 2015 for destroying another hotel room after demanding an upgrade. In an interview the next day, he blamed his behavior on a recent change in medication and said he would see a doctor to have it reviewed.

Brendon appeared in August 2015 on Dr. Phil to discuss his recent arrests and alcoholism, but he walked off the show shortly after the interview began. He later explained on Facebook that he had been drinking before the interview and felt unprepared to "lay [out] the darkest parts of myself on national TV". He returned to Dr. Phil in December that year to discuss his arrests and mental health struggles, including several suicide attempts.

Brendon was arrested in Saratoga Springs, New York in October 2015 for strangling his girlfriend in a hotel room. He was charged with felony third-degree robbery, criminal mischief, and obstruction of breathing. Brendon pleaded guilty to criminal mischief, a misdemeanor. His plea deal provided that he would avoid a custodial sentence if he completed drug and alcohol counseling and one year of probation. He subsequently entered a 90-day residential treatment program in California.

In October 2017, Brendon was arrested in California for assaulting another girlfriend. He was charged with felony corporal injury to a spouse in April 2019 and pleaded not guilty a month later. He later agreed to a plea deal to avoid a potential four-year prison sentence for felony domestic violence and violating active protective orders issued by two states. On February 28, 2020, he was sentenced to three years of probation, 20 hours of community service, and a 52-week domestic violence course.

Brendon was arrested in Terre Haute, Indiana, in August 2021 for obtaining a prescription medication by fraud. He was pulled over while driving erratically, and police found bags with crystal residue powder in them. A police dog search located secret compartments cut into the floor of the car containing additional bags with residue. The arrest violated Brendon's probation for domestic assault. A plea agreement was reached, though its details were not released.

=== Health problems and other issues ===
Brendon, who suffered from cauda equina syndrome, underwent spinal surgery after a fall in February 2021. Several days later, during a Facebook Live stream from his hospital room, he addressed the allegation made by his former co-star Charisma Carpenter against Joss Whedon, saying: "I love and support [her] very much and I know that story, and it's not a kind story". He added that although he "love[s] both Carpenter and Whedon", his relationship with Whedon had not always been friendly, and that it was "kinda hard to give a statement" given his relationship with those involved.

Following his August 2021 arrest, Brendon experienced paralysis in his genitals and legs. Two months later, he underwent another spinal surgery, during which his spinal cord was punctured, resulting in a cerebrospinal fluid leak. In 2022, he suffered a heart attack and was diagnosed with a congenital heart defect.

=== Death ===
On March 20, 2026, at age 54, Brendon died in his sleep in his home in Greencastle, Indiana. His body was discovered in his bed by a friend who was helping take care of him. His family announced his death later that day and indicated that he died of natural causes. A toxicology report was pending, but no foul play was suspected; the coroner noted that Brendon had a "history of cardiac issues." Various Buffy co-stars paid tribute to him on social media.

On May 5, 2026, the Putnam County Coroner determined the official cause of death to be atherosclerotic and hypertensive cardiovascular disease with a blockage in the right coronary artery.

== Filmography ==
=== Film ===
Year	Title	Role	Notes
1995	Children of the Corn III: Urban Harvest	Basketball Player One	
2000	Psycho Beach Party	Starcat	
2002	Demon Island	Kyle	
2007	Unholy	Lucas	
2008	Blood on the Highway	Chase Sinclair	
2009	A Golden Christmas	Michael	
2009	My Neighbor's Secret	Brent Keller	
2010	The Portal	Paul	
2013	Big Gay Love	Andy	
2013	Coherence	Mike	
2014	Indigo	Gary	
2014	Attack of the Morningside Monster	Mark Matthews	
2017	Surge of Power: Revenge of the Sequel	Himself	
2017	Redwood	Vincent	
2018	The Nanny	David	
2018	King of Crime	Brad Walsh	
2021	Wanton Want	Douglas Paynter	
2024	Yesterday Is Almost Here	Douglas Wynter	

=== Television ===
Year	Title	Role	Notes
1993	Married... with Children	Guy in Ray-Ray's Gang	Episode: "Hood 'n the Boyz"
1995	Dave's World	N/A	Episode: "Do the Write Thing"
1997–2003	Buffy the Vampire Slayer	Xander Harris	Main role, 143 episodes
2003	The Pool at Maddy Breaker's	Jeff	Television film
2004	Celeste in the City	Dana Blodgett/Harrison	Television film
2005–2006	Kitchen Confidential	Seth Richman	Main role, 13 episodes
2006	Relative Chaos	Gil Gilbert	Television film
2006–2007	American Dragon: Jake Long	Huntsboy No. 89	Recurring voice role, 6 episodes
2007	Fire Serpent	Jake Relm	Television film
2007–2014	Criminal Minds	Kevin Lynch	Recurring role (seasons 3–10), 21 episodes
2009	Without a Trace	Edger	Episode: "Undertow"
2010–2011	Private Practice	Lee McHenry	4 episodes (season 4)
2012	Hollywood Heights	Dan Testa	Episode: "Loren and Kelly Clash"
2014–2015	Faking It	Jackson Lee	Recurring role, 2 episodes
2019	Dark/Web	Donovan	Episodes: "Chapter Six", "Chapter Eight"

=== Video games ===
Year	Title	Role
2002	Buffy the Vampire Slayer	Xander Harris
2003	Buffy the Vampire Slayer: Chaos Bleeds	Xander Harris

== Awards and nominations ==
Year	Award	Category	Work	Result
1998	Saturn Awards	Best Genre TV Actor	Buffy the Vampire Slayer	Nominated
1999	Saturn Awards	Best Genre TV Actor	Buffy the Vampire Slayer	Nominated
2000	Saturn Awards	Best Genre TV Supporting Actor	Buffy the Vampire Slayer	Nominated
