= The Rebel (2007 film) =

- Theatrical release poster
- Directed by: Charlie Nguyen
- Written by: Charlie Nguyen; Johnny Tri Nguyen; Dominic Pereira
- Produced by: Jimmy Pham Nghiem; Charlie Nguyen; Johnny Tri Nguyen
- Starring: Johnny Tri Nguyen; Veronica Ngo; Dustin Nguyen
- Cinematography: Dominic Pereira
- Edited by: Charlie Nguyen; Ham Tran
- Music by: Christopher Wong
- Distributed by: Cinema Pictures; The Weinstein Company
- Release date: 27 April 2007
- Running time: 103 minutes
- Country: Vietnam
- Languages: Vietnamese; French
- Budget: US$1.5 million
- Box office: $430,150

The Rebel (Vietnamese: Dòng Máu Anh Hùng) is a 2007 Vietnamese martial arts film directed by Charlie Nguyen and starring Johnny Tri Nguyen, Dustin Nguyen and Veronica Ngo. It premiered on April 12, 2007, at the Vietnamese International Film Festival in Irvine, California. It was released on April 27, 2007, in Hanoi and Ho Chi Minh City and played as the Closing Night film at the 2007 VC FilmFest in Los Angeles.

== Plot ==
The movie is set in French Indochina - occupied Vietnam - in 1922, where peasant rebellions against the French colonialists have erupted throughout the country. In response, the French have created units of Vietnamese secret agents to track down and eliminate the rebels. One of the agents is Le Van Cuong. Although he has a perfect track record, his conscience is troubled by the bloodshed he has caused. Following the assassination of a high-ranking French official, Cuong is assigned to seek and kill the notorious leader of the resistance. Cuong encounters Vo Thanh Thuy, a relentless revolutionary fighter and the daughter of the rebel leader. She is captured and imprisoned by Cuong's cruel superior, Sy. Cuong suspects that Sy learned about the attack on the French official beforehand and could have prevented it. Suspicious, he warns Thuy that her organization has a mole and helps her escape the prison, thus becoming a fugitive himself. Her fiery patriotism inspires Cuong, and he develops feelings for the young woman as well. Meanwhile, Sy follows Cuong and Thuy, knowing the pair will lead him to Thuy's father.

Cuong changes his clothes and accompanies Thuy to her father. French soldiers attack them one night, but they managed to defeat them all. Thuy and Cuong then encounter Sy and Hua Danh. Though Sy couldn't find them, Cuong has to fight Hua Danh and manages to kill him, but not before being wounded. Later, while tending Cuong's wounds, Thuy reveals that her mother killed herself after being raped by a French soldier and couldn't bear having a child. Her father didn't learn of her mother's death until after he was freed from his imprisonment for opposition activities. Cuong and Thuy then make love. Meanwhile, Sy finds Cuong's father and tortures him before gouging his eyeball. He then faces Cuong and asks him where the rebel's hideout is. Cuong says that they have to go on a train, and Sy leaves. Cuong meets with Thuy, and she reveals that she lied about the train because she didn't trust him. She then takes him to her father's hideout.

Thuy's brother is suspicious of Cuong, while her father accepts him regardless. Suddenly, the hideout is ambushed because the French saw Cuong and Thuy together. Sy captures Thuy's father and reveals Cuong as a traitor to the French. When Sy delivers Thuy's father to his boss, his boss instead gives Sy another boss, not trusting a Vietnamese person to be in charge. Furious, Sy kills both of his bosses and plans to execute Thuy's father. Meanwhile, the rebels are held at gunpoint in a village, awaiting execution. Cuong asks the firing squad to take off his blindfold because he doesn't fear death. Using a hidden knife, he cuts his bindings and frees all the rebels. Cuong and Thuy fight off the soldiers, and Thuy's brother tells her to go save her father before dying.

Thuy and Cuong fight off the French people near a train, and Cuong finally confronts Sy. Cuong and Thuy finally manage to kill Sy by stabbing him in the eye. After they save Thuy's father, they return to the village where they found most of the people dead, except for a little girl. After paying their homage, Cuong and Thuy spread the ashes across the rivers of Vietnam.

== Cast and characters ==
=== Primary Characters ===
- Johnny Tri Nguyen as Le Van Cuong - The French-trained protagonist, who is a master of martial arts. He is working as an agent under the French colonizers to put an end to a rebellions in Vietnam, but is secretly wracked with guilt over his role.
- Veronica Ngo as Vo Thanh Thuy - The rebel leader's daughter who is used by the agents as a pawn to track down her father. She is also a skilled martial artist.
- Dustin Nguyen as Sy - Cuong's sadistic superior in the secret police. He is a formidable fighter with almost supernatural abilities, and is not averse to using torture.

=== Secondary Characters ===
- Chanh Tin Nguyen as Cuong's Father - Cuong's Father once had power within the former Vietnamese regime until the French took over the country. Now he wastes away most of his days in an opium house. Cuong blames his father for something that happened to his mother years ago.
- Nguyen Thang as Hua Danh - Another Vietnamese agent working with Sy to stop the rebellion. His specialty is knife fighting.
- Stephane Gauger as Dereu - Head of the French Secret Police force. He has been stationed in Vietnam for 10 years and looks forward to retirement so he can return to France. He often insults and condescends to Sy for his failures.
- David Minetti as Tessier - A powerful French officer who Cuong faces off with in one of the film's pivotal fight scenes.

== Production ==
"The Rebel's" cast and crew shot for 80 days in Vietnam, where the local film industry is still developing. They had to deal with a number of obstacles, including crew members who got sick, actors who were injured, and cultural officers who monitored the production's every move. In an interview with Johnny Tri Nguyen, he states that one of the hardest problems in making the film was finding the right actress to play the female lead.

Parts of the film, mainly street scenes in the first half of the film, were shot in the old port town of Hội An (standing in for Hanoi).

== Reception ==
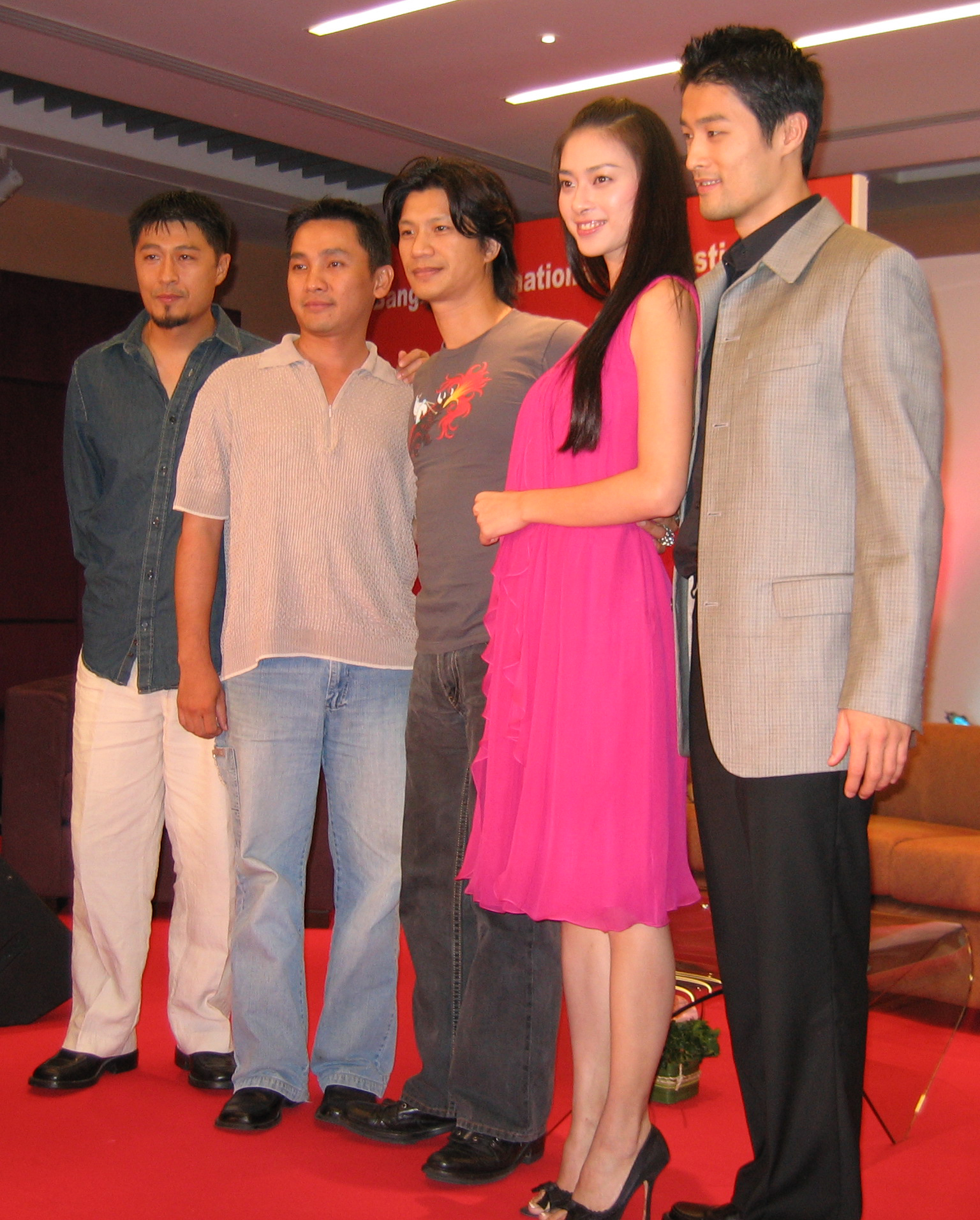
From left, director Charlie Nguyen, producer Jimmy Pham Nghiem and actors Dustin Nguyen, Johnny Tri Nguyen, Ngo Thanh Van, at a press conference during the 2007 Bangkok International Film Festival, where the film was screened twice.

The film premiered in Vietnam in April 2007, where it proved to be a huge success, garnering the highest box office gross for a locally made film up to that point. At the time, it was the most expensive Vietnamese film with a budget of $1.5 million. The Rebel was released in the United States as a two-disc DVD set on September 30, 2008 (from Dragon Dynasty). In the special features, Johnny Nguyen, Dustin Nguyen, and Ngo Thanh Van not only provide audio commentary, but also dubbed their own characters for the film's English language track. It was also featured at the 2007 Bangkok International Film Festival, the Austin Film Festival, the Hawaii International Film Festival, and was the Opening Night screening at the 2007 Mammoth Film Festival.

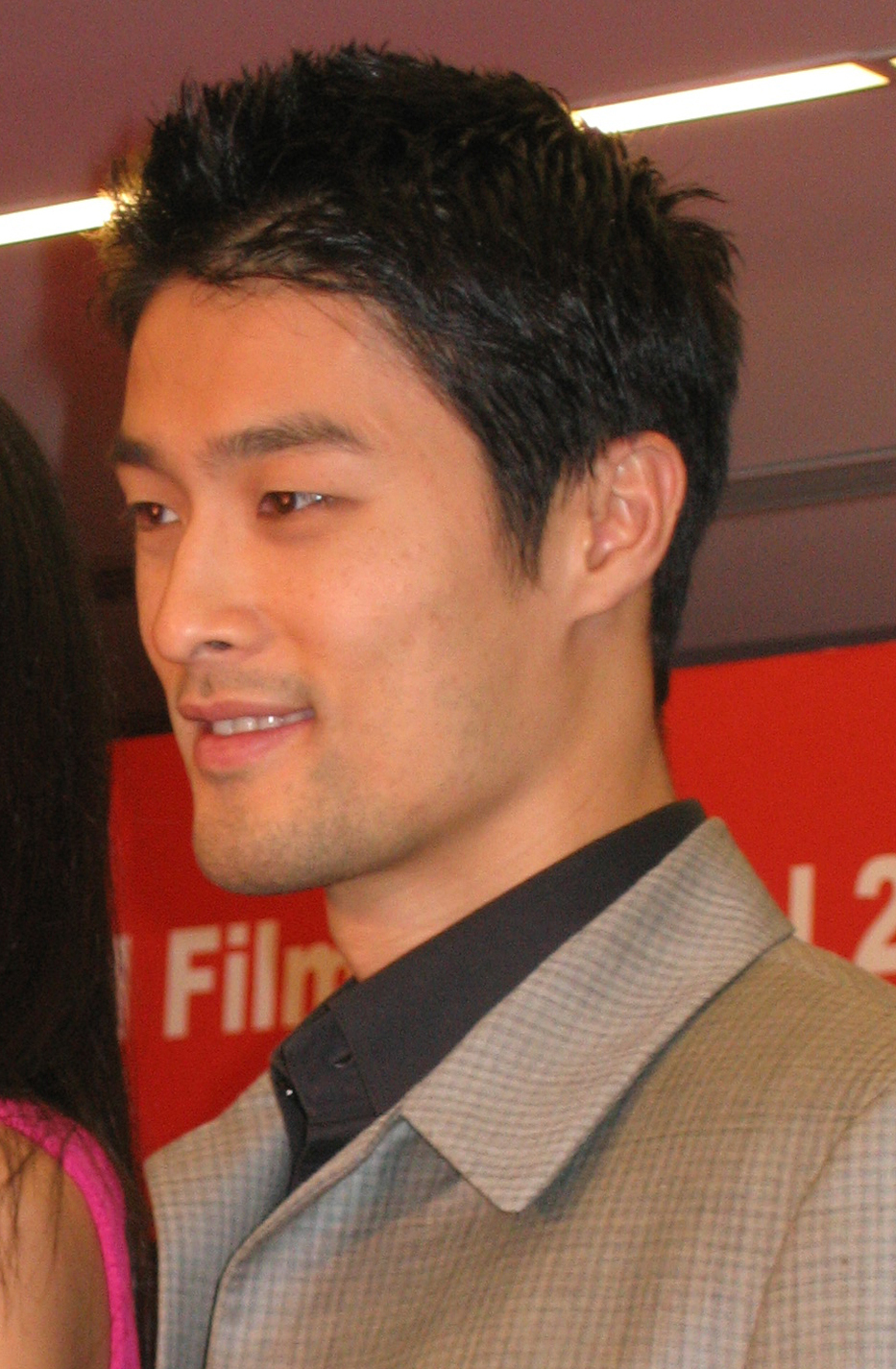
Johnny Tri Nguyen.

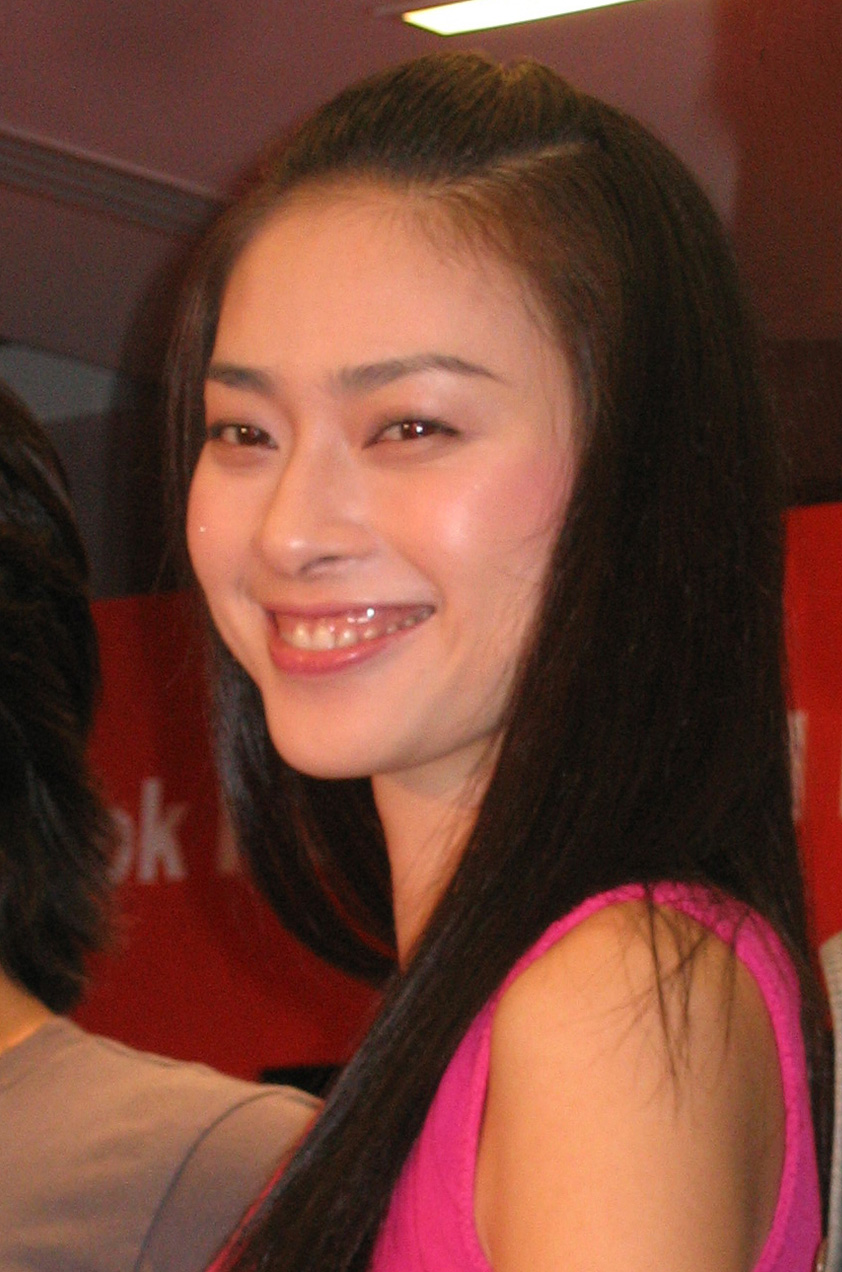
Veronica Ngo.
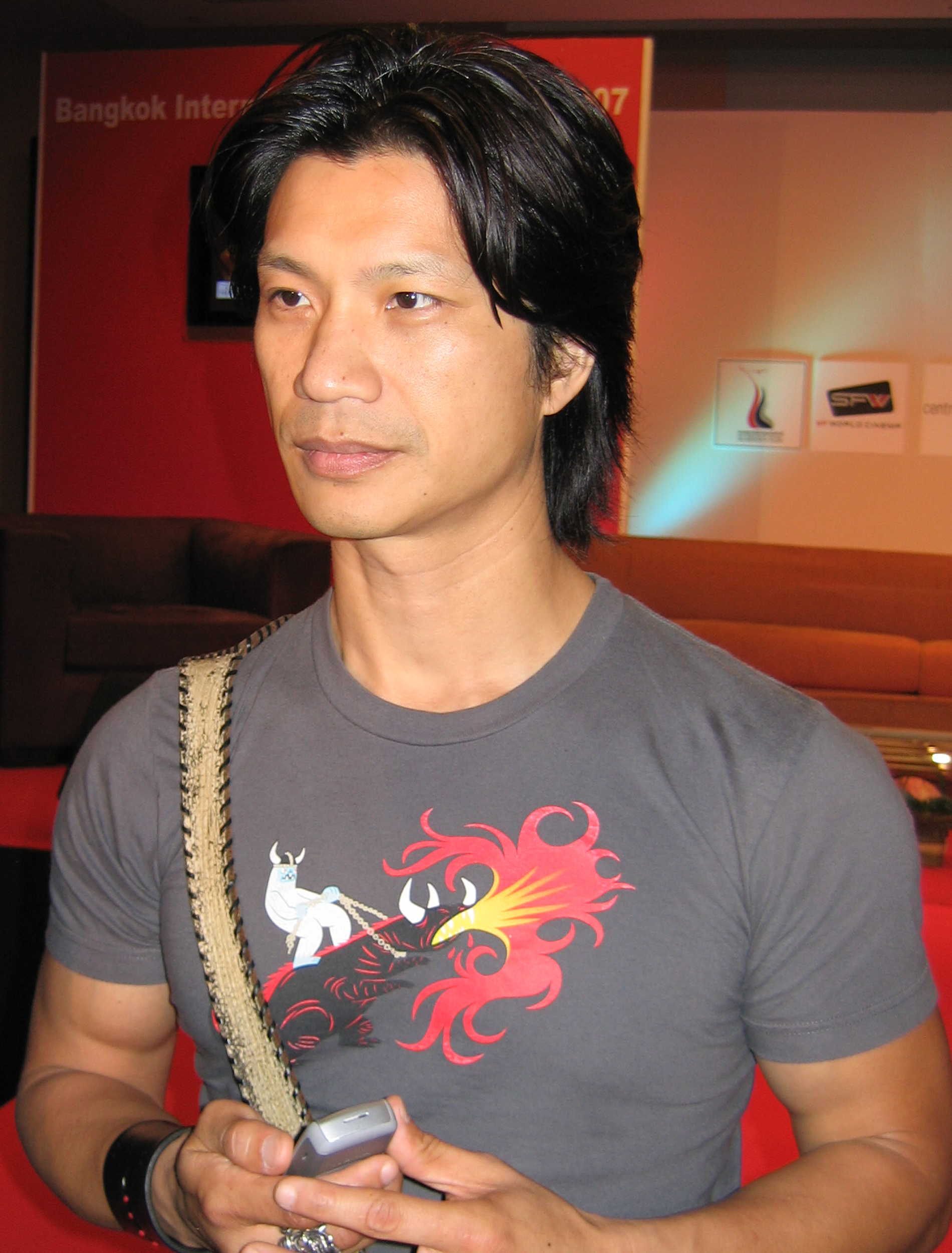
Dustin Nguyen.

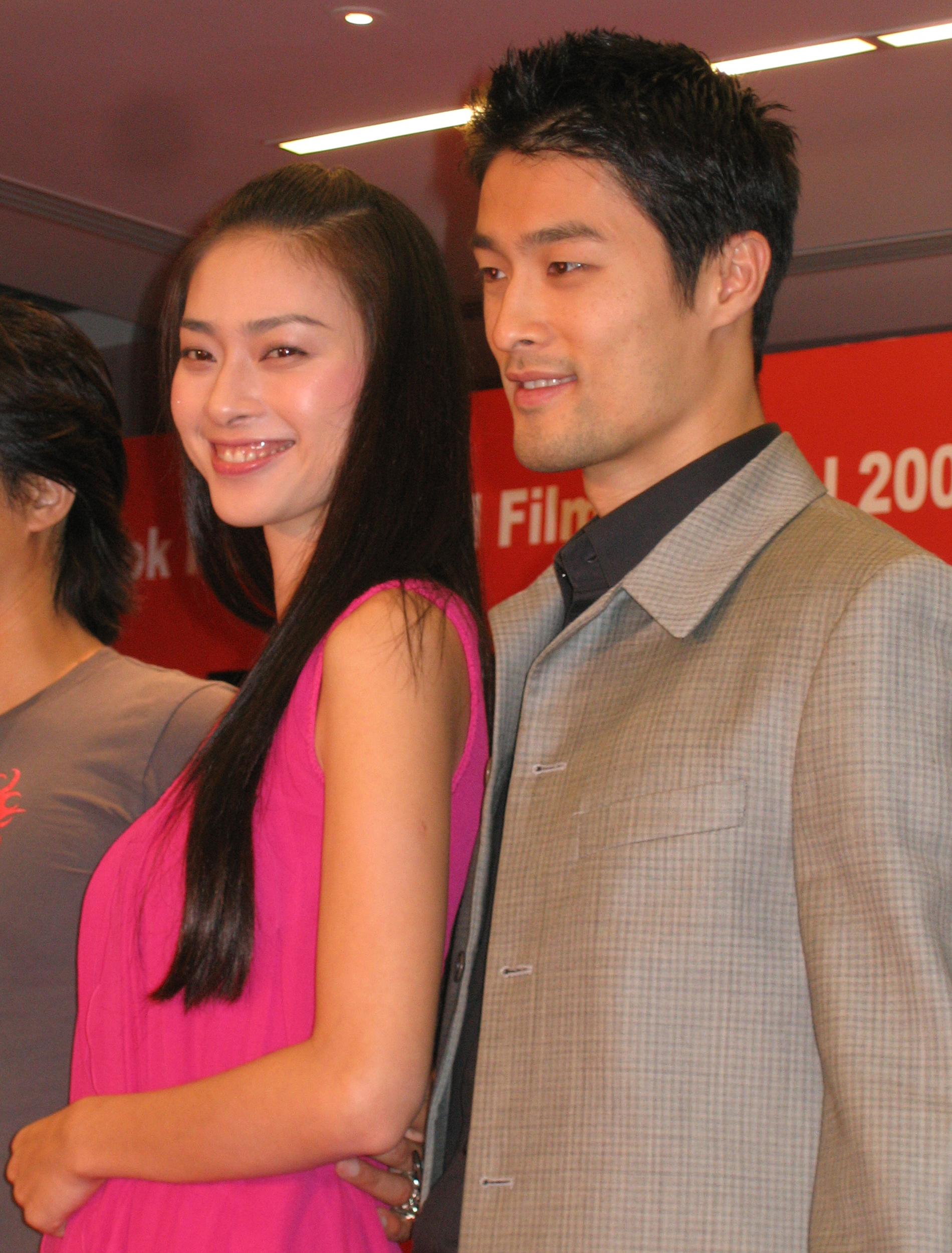
Veronica and Johnny.

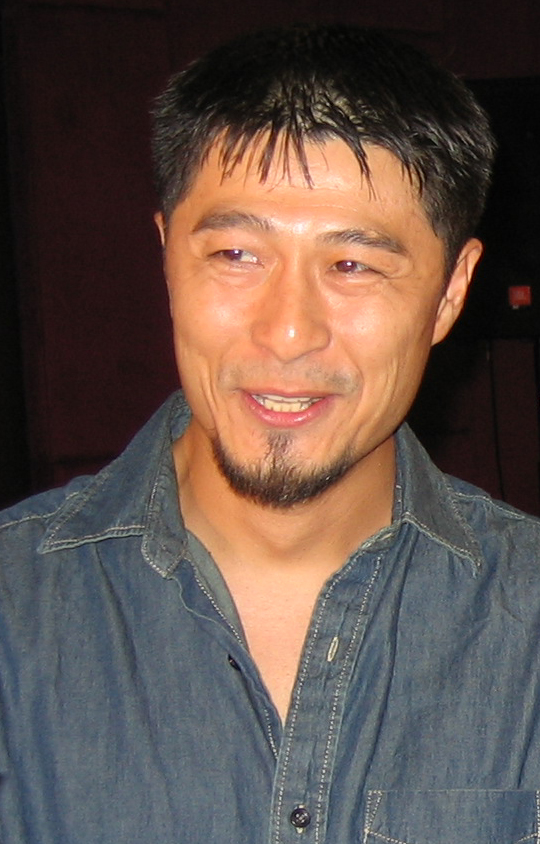
Charlie Nguyen.

== Honours and awards ==
- VIFF 2007
- Feature film of 15th Vietnam Film Festival
