= Jonathan Lisecki =

American actor

Jonathan Lisecki (born 1976) is an American producer, director, writer and actor. Originally from the Bronx, Lisecki comes from an Irish background. He studied theater in college and initially worked as an actor. He was nominated for the Independent Spirit Award for Best First Screenplay for his film Gayby. It was adapted from a short he made in 2010. Lisecki married New Yorker music critic Alex Ross in Canada in 2006.

== Filmography ==
Year	Title	Type	Role
2002	Searching for Paradise	Feature Film	Actor (Dave Pierce)
2006	The Limbo Room	Feature Film	Actor (Darren)
2008	Woman in Burka	Short Film	Writer, director, actor (Jonny)
2010	Gayby	Short Film	Writer, producer, director
2011	Wuss	Short Film	Actor (Coach)
2011	Couples Therapy	Short Film	Actor (Jonathon)
2012	Gayby	Feature Film	Writer, director, actor (Nelson)
2012–12	The Outs	Internet Series	Producer (four episodes)
2013	Big Gay Love	Feature Film	Actor (Bob), Producer
2013	Ego Death	Short Film	Actor
2014	White Creek	Feature Film	Contributing Producer
