= Cầu Kè =

Cầu Kè Xã Cầu Kè
- Commune
- Cầu Kè commune
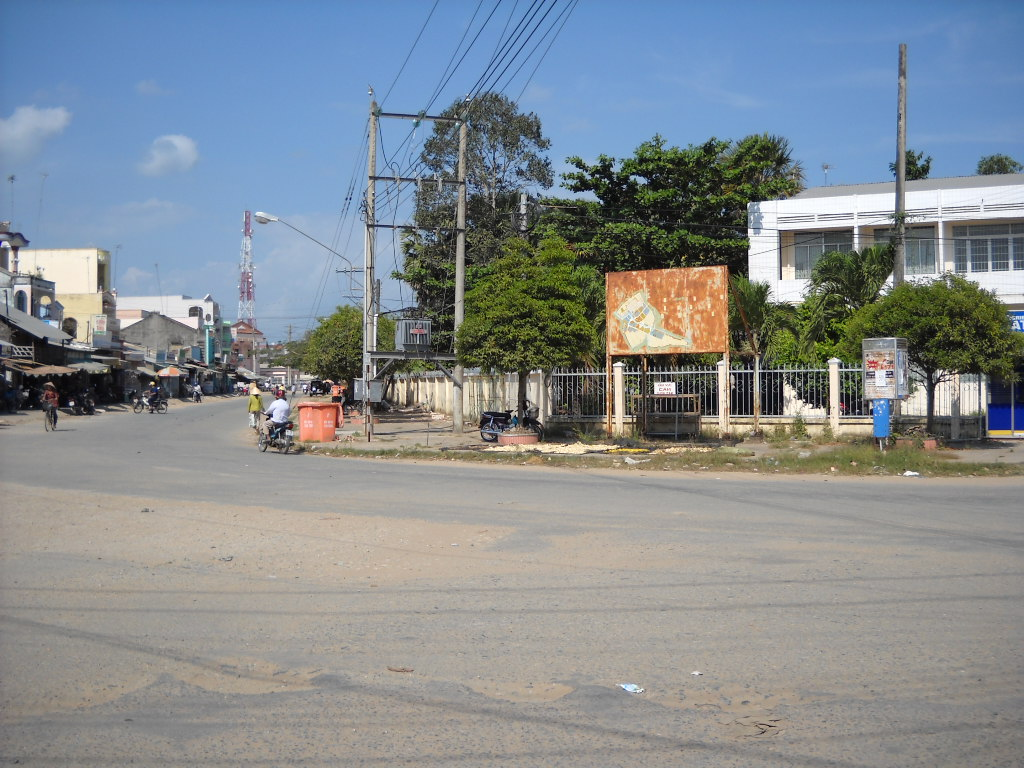
- A road in Cầu Kè Commune

- Location within Vietnam
- Coordinates: 9°52′19″N 106°03′28″E
- Country: Vietnam
- Region: Mekong Delta
- Province: Vĩnh Long
- Establish: June 16, 2025

Area
  - Total: 54.12 km^{2} (20.90 sq mi)

Population 2025
  - Total: 35.491 people
  - Density: 0.6558/km^{2} (1.698/sq mi)
- Time zone: UTC+7 (UTC + 7)

Cầu Kè is a commune (xã) of Vĩnh Long Province, Vietnam.

== Geography ==
Cầu Kè Commune is situated as follows:

- To the east, it borders Tân An.
- To the west, it borders An Phú Tân.
- To the south, it borders Phong Thạnh.
- To the north, it borders Tam Ngãi.

Cầu Kè Commune covers an area of 54.12 km²; as of 2024, it has a population of 35,491 people, resulting in a population density of 0 people/km².

== Administration divisions ==
Cầu Kè Commune is divided into 19 hamlets: 1, 2, 3, 4, 5, 6, Bà My, Châu Hưng, Giồng Dầu, Giồng Lớn, Ô Mịch, Ô Rồm, Ô Tưng A, Ô Tưng B, Rùm Sóc, Thông Thảo, Trà Bôn, Trà Kháo, and Xóm Lớn.

== History ==
On October 7, 1995, the Government promulgated Decree 62-CP regarding the establishment of Cầu Kè Township, based on the adjustment of a portion of the land area and population of Hòa Ân Commune.

On October 15, 2019, the People's Council of Trà Vinh Province issued Resolution 157/NQ-HĐND regarding:

- The merger of Khóm 8 into Khóm 5;
- The merger of Khóm 7 into Khóm 6.

Cầu Kè Town is divided into 6 *khóm* (residential clusters): 1, 2, 3, 4, 5, and 6.

On June 16, 2025, the Standing Committee of the National Assembly issued Resolution No. 1687/NQ-UBTVQH15 regarding the reorganization of commune-level administrative units in Vĩnh Long Province in 2025. Resolution No. 1687/NQ-UBTVQH15 of the National Assembly Standing Committee regarding the reorganization of commune-level administrative units in Vinh Long Province in 2025. Pursuant to this Resolution, the entire natural area and population of Cau Ke Town, along with the communes of Hoa An and Chau Dien, are to be consolidated into a new commune named Cau Ke Commune.

Following the merger, Cau Ke Commune encompasses a natural area of 54.12 km² and a population of 35,491 people.
