= Vietnam Idol season 4 =

Vietnam Idol
- Season 4
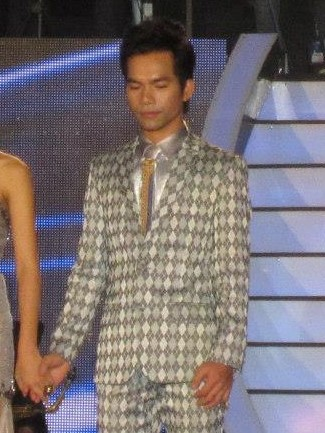
- Hosted by: Huy Khánh
- Judges: Mỹ Tâm; Nguyễn Quang Dũng; Quốc Trung
- Winner: Ya Suy
- Runner-up: Hoàng Quyên
- Finals venue: Quân Khu 7 Stadium

Release
- Original network: VTV
- Original release: August 17, 2012 – February 1, 2013

Season chronology
- ← Previous; Season 3

The fourth season of Vietnam Idol aired on August 17, 2012. This year sees some major changes in the show's structure. Mỹ Tâm joins the judging panel as the replacement for Siu Black while Quốc Trung and Nguyễn Quang Dũng remains on the panel. Huy Khánh takes over as the host for this season. This season will follow the same format as American Idol season 11. Vietnam Idol used the new title screen and logo with a different font started from Spectacular round.

The winner will receive: 600 million VND in cash ($30,000), 1-year promotion on MTV Vietnam as well as support for making a music video from the channel.

== Process ==
=== Auditions ===
Auditions started on July 4, 2012 in Da Nang and took place in several cities and towns in Vietnam; however, there was only 60 golden tickets given out during the auditions.

Region	Open Audition Date	Call-back Date	Venue
Huế	July 1, 2012	—N/a	Indochine Palace Hotel
Thái Nguyên	July 1, 2012	—N/a	Thái Nguyên Hotel
Da Nang	July 4–5, 2012	—N/a	Tien Sa Sporting Hall
Hai Phong	July 7, 2012	—N/a	Hoang Long Hotel
Hanoi	July 11–12, 2012	July 12–14, 2012	Mỹ Đình National Stadium
Nha Trang	July 18, 2012	—N/a	Sheraton Nha Trang Hotel & Spa
Da Lat	July 18, 2012	—N/a	Ana Mandara Villas Dalat Resort & Spa
Cần Thơ	July 20, 12	—N/a	Chuong Duong Hotel
Mỹ Tho	July 20, 12	—N/a	Diamond Palace
Ho Chi Minh City	July 21–23, 2012	July 23–25, 2012	Ton Duc Thang University (Tan Phong Campus) (Precast); Riverside Palace (Callbacks)

=== Theater round ===
Top 60 contestants were chosen to advance to the Theater round in Ho Chi Minh City. After the first elimination, 32 contestants remained and were divided into 8 groups. The judges picked out the top 16, including 8 girls and 8 boys for the semi-final.

== Semi-finals ==
Semifinals round began on September 14, consisting of two nights. In first round for boys, two were chosen by judges and two were saved through public votes. The lowest public-voted of the remaining four were automatically out and the rest sang off in order to get a wild card to final rounds. The second round for girls was on September 21 with the same rules.

=== Males ===
Order	Contestant	Song (songwriter)	Result
1	Nguyễn Duy Khánh	"Góc tối" (Nguyễn Hải Phong)	Eliminated
2	Đinh Đức Thảo	"Lời nhắn số 4" (Hồ Hoài Anh)	Wild Card
3	Nguyễn Thanh Hưng	"Thuộc về" (self-written)	Wild Card
4	Nguyễn Thanh Tùng	"Vệt nắng cuối trời" (Tiến Minh)	Advanced
5	Biện Tấn Phát	"Nếu điều đó xảy ra" (Ngọc Châu)	Eliminated
6	Ya Suy	"Trái tim bên lề" (Phạm Khải Tuấn)	Advanced
7	Nguyễn Hồng Phước	"Nói chung là... (chuyện thằng say)" (Anh Tuấn)	Advanced
8	Nguyễn Anh Quân	"Ngày tắt" (Dương Trường Giang)	Advanced

=== Females ===
Order	Contestant	Song (songwriter)	Result
1	Nguyễn Thu Hà	"Đường về xa xôi" (Thanh Bui)	Eliminated
2	Nguyễn Thị Bảo Trâm	"Phố nghèo" (Trần Tiến)	Advanced
3	Trần Huỳnh Thanh Trúc	"Chơi vơi tôi ru tôi" (Hồ Hoài Anh)	Advanced
4	Lê Huệ Thương	"Cảm ơn tình yêu tôi" (Phương Uyên)	Eliminated
5	Cao Thanh Thảo My	"Đi thôi" (Thùy Hoàng Diễm)	Wild Card
6	Nguyễn Hương Giang	"Trò đùa tạo hóa" (Nguyễn Hồng Thuận)	Advanced
7	Hoàng Lệ Quyên	"Và em có anh" (Mỹ Tâm)	Advanced
8	Trần Thanh Huyền	"Có nhớ đêm nào" (Khánh Băng)	Wild Card

=== Wild Card round ===
Order	Contestant	Song (songwriter)	Result
1	Trần Thanh Huyền	"Nỗi lòng" (Minh Vy)	Eliminated
2	Cao Thanh Thảo My	"Một ngày mới" (Hùng Lân, Hoàng Anh)	Advanced
3	Đinh Đức Thảo	"Vì đời" (Little Monsters)	Eliminated
4	Nguyễn Thanh Hưng	"Để dành" (Nguyễn Xinh Xô)	Advanced

== Finals ==
The finals began two weeks after the semi-finals had concluded.

Each week the finalists perform live on stage to a television audience. The contestant receiving the least viewers votes is eliminated from the competition. Introduced for the second time is the ability of the judges to collectively override the voters' decision once, if they deem that a contestant has been voted-out prematurely. However, this results in the elimination of two contestants in the following week instead of one when activated.

From top 10 – top 6: 3 judges intensity

=== Top 10 – Who Are You? ===
- Guest mentor: Quốc Thiên & Uyên Linh

Order	Contestant	Song	Result
1	Trần Huỳnh Thanh Trúc	"Vài lần đón đưa" (Some time filler)	Safe
2	Nguyễn Thanh Hưng	"Cánh đông tình yêu" (Fields of Love)	Eliminated
3	Nguyễn Hương Giang	"Đừng ngoảnh lại" (Don't Turn Back)	Safe
4	Phạm Hồng Phước	"Buổi sáng ở CIAO cafe" (Morning in CIAO Café)	Safe
5	Cao Thanh Thảo My	"Tôi tìm thấy tôi" (I Found You)	Safe
6	Nguyễn Anh Quân	"Ngày không mưa" (Day No Rain)	Bottom 3
7	Nguyễn Thanh Tùng	"Nuối tiếc" (Sorry)	Safe
8	Hoàng Lệ Quyên	"Chiếc lá vô tình" (The leaves loveless)	Safe
9	Nguyễn Thị Bảo Trâm	"Tình xô mãi đòi ta" (Love shove offer life i)	Bottom 3
10	Yasuy	"Lặng thầm một tình yêu" (Silent once love)	Safe

=== Top 9 – Exciting Music ===
- Guest mentor: Mỹ Tâm

Order	Contestant	Song	Result
1	Cao Thanh Thảo My	"Không yêu không yêu" (No love no love)	Safe
2	Nguyễn Anh Quân	"Nam nhi" (Man)	Safe
3	Trần Huỳnh Thanh Trúc	"Đừng nói và đừng hứa" (Don't say and don't promise)	Eliminated
4	Nguyễn Thanh Tùng	"Phố cổ" (Old Town)	Safe
5	Nguyễn Hương Giang	"Tình xót xa thôi" (Love laments alone)	Safe
6	Hoàng Lệ Quyên	"Bàn tay trắng" (White hand)	Safe
7	Phạm Hồng Phước	"Chuyện thường ngày" (Story in day normal)	Bottom 3
8	Yasuy	"Trở về" (Home)	Bottom 3
9	Nguyễn Thị Bảo Trâm	"Đời bỗng vui" (Life of fun)	Safe

=== Top 8 – We Are the World ===
- Guest mentor: Thanh Bùi

Order	Contestant	Song	Result
1	Phạm Hồng Phước	"Miss Kiss Kiss Bang"	Eliminated
2	Cao Thanh Thảo My	"The Climb"	Safe
3	Nguyễn Hương Giang	"Tell Me Your Wish"	Bottom 3
4	Yasuy	"Hello"	Safe
5	Nguyễn Thanh Tùng	"Feeling Good"	Safe
6	Nguyễn Anh Quân	"Unchained Melody"	Bottom 3
7	Nguyễn Thị Bảo Trâm	"Mercy"	Safe
8	Hoàng Lệ Quyên	"Move"	Safe

=== Top 7 – Đức Trí & Lưu Thiên Hương ===
- Guest mentor: Đức Trí & Lưu Thiên Hương

Order	Contestant	Song (songwriter)	Result
1	Nguyễn Thị Bảo Trâm	"Khi giấc mơ về" (Đức Trí)	Bottom 3
2	Nguyễn Thanh Tùng	"Chàng sơ mi" (Lưu Thiên Hương)	Bottom 3
3	Yasuy	"Anh sẽ nhớ mãi" (Đức Trí)	Safe
4	Hoàng Lệ Quyên	"Hẹn gặp lại anh" (Lưu Thiên Hương)	Safe
5	Nguyễn Anh Quân	"Người hát tình ca" (Lưu Thiên Hương)	Eliminated
6	Cao Thanh Thảo My	"Từng ngày dài" (Đức Trí)	Safe
7	Nguyễn Hương Giang	"Vì em yêu anh" (Đức Trí)	Safe

=== Top 6 – Anh Quân & Võ Thiện Thanh ===
- Guest mentor: Anh Quân & Võ Thiện Thanh

Order	Contestant	Song (songwriter)	Result
1	Yasuy	"Lại gần bên anh" (Anh Quân)	Safe
2	Nguyễn Hương Giang	"Bóng mây qua thềm" (Võ Thiện Thanh)	Bottom 3
3	Nguyễn Thanh Tùng	"Tiếng dương cầm" (Anh Quân)	Safe
4	Hoàng Lệ Quyên	"Chuông gió" (Võ Thiện Thanh)	Saved
5	Nguyễn Thị Bảo Trâm	"Hãy cho em gần bên anh" (Anh Quân)	Safe
6	Cao Thanh Thảo My	"Ngày của tôi" (Võ Thiện Thanh)	Bottom 3

=== Top 6 Redux – No Love Song Music ===
- Guest mentor: Mỹ Linh

Order	Contestant	Song	Result
1	Nguyễn Hương Giang	"Taxi"	Bottom 3
2	Nguyễn Thanh Tùng	"Lời ru cho con"	Eliminated
3	Cao Thanh Thảo My	"Trả lại cho em"	Eliminated
4	Hoàng Lệ Quyên	"Giấc mơ của tôi"	Safe
5	Yasuy	"Chào buổi sáng"	Safe
6	Nguyễn Thị Bảo Trâm	"Vòng tròn"	Safe

=== Top 4 – Duets ===
- Guest mentor: Lệ Quyên
- Result: Hương Giang was eliminated

Order	Contestant	Song	Result
1	Yasuy & Hương Giang	"Tình về nơi đâu"	Hương Giang eliminated
2	Yasuy & Bảo Trâm	"Khúc giao mùa"	Safe
3	Bảo Trâm & Hoàng Quyên	"Bay"	Safe
4	Hương Giang & Hoàng Quyên	"Thềm nhà có hoa"	Hương Giang eliminated

=== Top 3 – Contestant's Choice, Judges' choice ===
- Guest mentor: Quốc Trung & Mỹ Tâm

Order	Contestant	Song	Result
1	Nguyễn Thị Bảo Trâm	"Hoa lài màu xanh"	Eliminated
2	Yasuy	"Ngày xưa em đến"	Safe
3	Hoàng Lệ Quyên	"Đừng buồn phiền"	Safe
4	Yasuy	"Tan Biến"	Safe
5	Nguyễn Thị Bảo Trâm	"Tan biến"	Eliminated
6	Hoàng Lệ Quyên	"Ngày hôm qua"	Safe

=== Top 2 Finale – Contestant's Choice, Huy Tuấn's Choice, International Music ===
- Guest Mentor: Mỹ Linh

Order	Contestant	Song	Result
1	Hoàng Lệ Quyên	Mùa cây trổ lá	Runner-Up
2	Ya Suy	Viết tình ca	Winner
3	Hoàng Lệ Quyên	Người em yêu mãi	Runner-Up
4	Ya Suy	Nơi ấy	Winner
5	Hoàng Lệ Quyên	Try It on My Own	Runner-Up
6	Ya Suy	What I've Done	Winner

=== Grand Finale ===
The grand finale took place in Quân khu 7 Stadium. 2,500 tickets out of over 25,000 were invitational; therefore, some tickets left were scalped up to 500,000 to 700,000 VND each. The show started at 8 pm (local time) and were broadcast live on VTV3. Mỹ Linh, previously mentors on the show, performed with the two finalists – Hoàng Quyên and Ya Suy. The show's judge Mỹ Tâm performed together with Ya Suy. Huy Tuấn, Mỹ Tâm, Huy Khánh announced the winner of the season was Ya Suy from Lâm Đồng. Suy then performed the winning song Giây phút khát khao.

==== Musical Performance ====
1. "Phút giây ngọt ngào" – Hoàng Quyên & Ya Suy
2. "Ngày mai nắng lên em sẽ về" – Male Finalists
3. "Ơ hay" – Female Finalists
4. "Nơi tình yêu bắt đầu" – Yasuy
5. "Và em có anh" – Hoàng Quyên
6. "Mưa và nỗi nhớ" – Bảo Trâm & Anh Quân
7. "Cho người nơi ấy" – Uyên Linh
8. "Tình về nơi đâu" – Ya Suy & Mỹ Tâm
9. "I'll Be There" – Hoàng Quyên & Thanh Bùi
10. "Anh mang theo mùa xuân" – Văn Mai Hương
11. "Ngôi sao ước mơ" – Top 8"
12. "LK Đánh thức bình minh", "Đen Trắng" – Mỹ Tâm
13. "Phút giây khát khao" – Ya Suy

== Finalist ==
Contestant	Age	Hometown	Rank
Yasuy	25	Lâm Đồng	Winner
Hoàng Lệ Quyên	20	Thái Nguyên	Runner-up
Nguyễn Thị Bảo Trâm	21	Bắc Giang	3rd
Nguyễn Hương Giang	21	Hanoi	4th
Cao Thanh Thảo My	17	Hanoi	5th-6th
Nguyễn Thanh Tùng	20	Hanoi	5th-6th
Nguyễn Anh Quân	24	Hanoi	7th
Phạm Hồng Phước	21	Ho Chi Minh City	8th
Trần Huỳnh Thanh Trúc	23	Bình Dương	9th
Nguyễn Thanh Hưng	21	Ninh Bình	10th

== Elimination chart ==
{{center|

Legend
Female	Male	Top 10	Wildcard	Top 16	Winner

Safe	Safe First	Safe Last	Eliminated	Withdrew	Judges' Save

Stage:		Semi-Finals	Wild Card	Finals								
Week:		09/28		10/12	10/26	11/09	11/23	12/07	12/21	01/04	01/18	02/01
Place	Contestant	Result										
1	Yasuy	Top 10	—N/a		Btm 3							Winner
2	Hoàng Lệ Quyên	Top 10	—N/a					Saved				Runner-up
3	Nguyễn Thị Bảo Trâm	Top 10	—N/a	Btm 3			Btm 3				Elim	
4	Nguyễn Hương Giang	Top 10	—N/a			Btm 3		Btm 3	Btm 3	Elim		
5-6	Cao Thanh Thảo My	Wild Card	Top 10					Btm 3	Elim			
5-6	Nguyễn Thanh Tùng	Top 10	—N/a				Btm 3		Elim			
7	Nguyễn Anh Quân	Top 10	—N/a	Btm 3		Btm 3	Elim					
8	Phạm Hồng Phước	Top 10	—N/a		Btm 3	Elim						
9	Trần Huỳnh Thanh Trúc	Top 10	—N/a		Elim							
10	Nguyễn Thanh Hưng	Wild Card	Top 10	Elim								
11-12	Đinh Đức Thảo	Wild Card	Elim									
11-12	Trần Thanh Huyền	Wild Card	Elim									
13-16	Nguyễn Thị Thu Hà	Elim										
13-16	Lê Huệ Thương	Elim										
13-16	Biện Tấn Phát	Elim										
13-16	Nguyễn Duy Khánh	Elim										

== Results show performances ==
Week	Performer(s)	Title	Performance type
Top 16	MTV Band featuring Karik	"Nói chung là... (chuyện thằng say)"	live
Top 10	Văn Mai Hương	"Chuyện tình nhà thơ"	live
Top 10	Quốc Thiên	"Xin chào! Xin chào!"	live
Top 9	P.A.K. Band	"Thời gian"	live
Top 9	M-TP	"Cơn mưa ngang qua"	live
Top 8	Mỹ Tâm	"Trắng đen"	live
Top 8	Uyên Linh	"Born This Way"	live
Top 7	Noo Phước Thịnh	"Vắng Em"	live
Top 7	Tùng Dương	"The Greatest Love of All"	live
Top 6	Quang Linh & Top 6	Tôi Mơ	live
Top 6	Mỹ Linh	Gửi Anh	live
Top 6 Redux	Đinh Mạnh Ninh	Hà Nội trà đá vỉa hè	live
Top 6 Redux	Hồng Nhung	Papa	live
Top 4	Suboi & Kimmese	"Feel the Beat"	live
Top 4	Lệ Quyên	Nỗi Đau Ngự Trị	live
Top 3	Phương Vy	"Giận Anh"	live
Top 3	Phương Vy	"Anh Đừng Đi"	live
Top 3	Nam Khánh & Top 3	"Cứ ngủ say"	live
