= Vietnam Idol season 3 =

Vietnam Idol
- Season 3
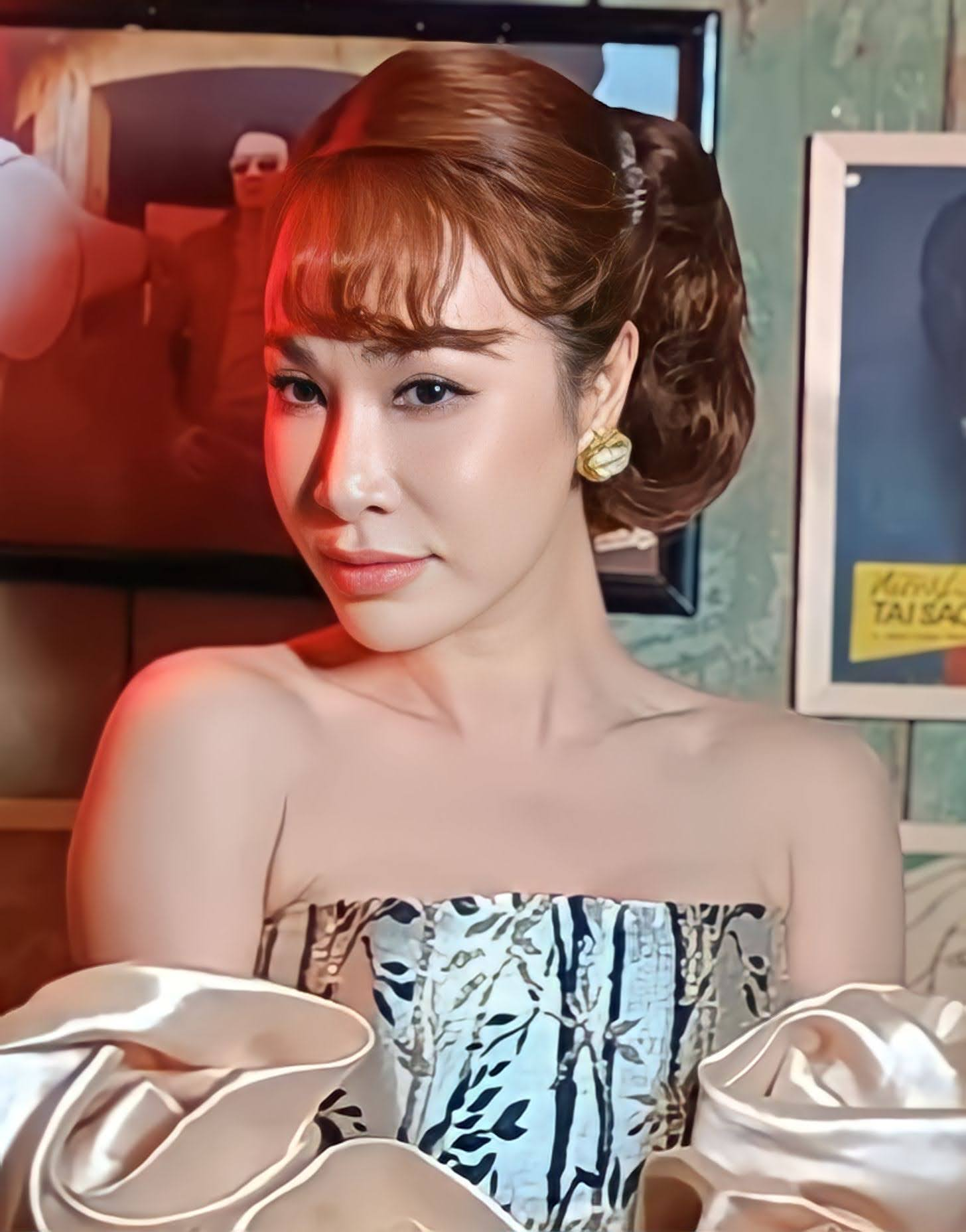
- Hosted by: Phan Anh
- Judges: Siu Black; Nguyễn Quang Dũng; Quốc Trung; Đặng Diễm Quỳnh
- Winner: Uyên Linh
- Runner-up: Văn Mai Hương
- Finals venue: Lan Anh Music Center

Release
- Original network: VTV
- Original release: August 21 – December 25, 2010

Season chronology
- ← Previous; Season 2 Next → Season 4

The third season of Vietnam Idol premiered on VTV6 on August 21, 2010. There are two episodes every Tuesday and Saturday together with a daily five-minute news. This season features a new option for the judges is to "save" a contestant from elimination. This, however, was not used this season.

Trần Nguyễn Uyên Linh was announced to be the third winner of Vietnam Idol, she received $20,000 in cash and a recording contract.

== Process ==
Following a break in production, it was confirmed that the show has been renewed for 2010. The new season will adopt a new structure, with changes to broadcasting and production. The broadcasting stations were changed from HTV (Ho Chi Minh City Television) to VTV6 - a cable channel targeted at young audiences of VTV (Vietnam Television) The producer company of the first 2 seasons, Dong Tay Promotion, will be replaced by BHD Pictures. Siu Black remains on the judging panel but will be joined by two new judges, Quốc Trung and Nguyễn Quang Dũng. Phan Anh will also take over as the host of the contest.

=== Audition round ===
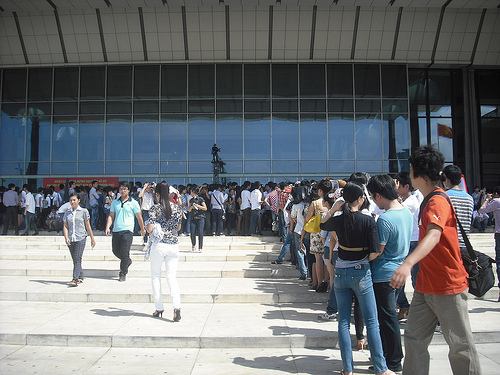
Initial audition for season 3 of Vietnam Idol at Vietnam National Convention Center, Hanoi.

Air Date	Audion Region	First Audition Date	Call-Back Audition Date	Venue	Golden Tickets
August 21, 2010	Hanoi	July 3–5, 2010	July 6–7, 2010	National Convention Center	37
August 28, 2010	Danang	June 27, 2010	June 28–29, 2010	Life Resort	9
August 28, 2010	Can Tho	July 13, 2010	July 14–15, 2010	Palace Cần Thơ Hotel	7
September 4, 2010	Ho Chi Minh City	July 21–23, 2010	July 23–25, 2010	Crescent Plaza	43
Total Tickets to Ho Chi Minh City					96

Auditions were also held in Central Highlands and North regions.

One hundred contestants will advance from this round and into the Knock Out Round.

=== HCMC week ===
The first day of the week featured ninety-six contestants (but actually ninety-three were present at that time) advanced from the audition round. After the first elimination, forty-eight remained and then split up into 12 groups of four. Twenty-four made it into the final round in which judges revealed who were the semi-finalists.

== Semi-finals ==
The semi-finals takes place over three weeks, with the results announced the following Tuesday. During the first two weeks, sixteen contestants are split and perform by gender. Only four of them will be given a bye to the Top 10, while the remaining 10 contestants compete in the last semi-final round for a spot in the finals. During this whole process, judges have the right to let their five favorite contestants be finalists.

=== Top 16 ===
Order	Males			Females
Order	Contestant	Song (composer)	Result	Contestant	Song (composer)	Result
1	Lân Nhã	"Ly cà phê ban mê" (Nguyễn Cường	Wildcard	Mai Hương	"Nắng chờ" (Anh Minh)	Wildcard
2	Y Jalin	"Lang Biang S'Ning" (Karajan K'Plin & Karajan Dick)	Eliminated	Thu Trang	"Anh" (Xuân Phương)	Eliminated
3	Văn Thắng	"Bông hồng thủy tinh" (Trần Lập)	Wildcard	Nguyễn T. Phương Anh	"Từ khi em đến" (Võ Thiện Thanh)	Wildcard
4	Đăng Khoa	"Phố cổ" (Nguyễn Duy Hùng)	Top 10	Minh Nguyệt	"Ngựa ô thương nhớ" (Trần Tiến)	Bottom
5	Trung Quân	"Lại gần bên em" (Anh Quân & Huy Tuấn)	Wildcard	Bích Phương	"Đêm cô đơn" (Trung Kiên)	Bottom
6	Đức Anh	"Bất chợt một tình yêu" (Nguyễn Đức Cường)	Top 10	Uyên Linh	"Với anh" (Hồ Hoài Anh)	Top 10
7	Vương Linh	"Em về tinh khôi" (Quốc Bảo)	Wildcard	Phương Ly	"Những ngày thứ bảy trong năm" (Nguyễn Duy Hùng)	Wildcard
8	Văn Viết	"Đôi chân trần" (Y Phôn K'Sor)	Bottom	Lều Phương Anh	"Chỉ có thể là tình yêu" (Phương Uyên)	Top 10

=== Wildcard ===
Order	Contestant	Song (composer)	Result
1	Vương Linh	Gánh hàng rong (Lê Quốc Dũng)	Top 10
2	Minh Nguyệt	"Tình 2000"(Võ Thiện Thanh)	Eliminated
3	Văn Thắng	"Mắt đen" (Trần Lập)	Eliminated
4	Văn Viết	"Đi tìm bóng núi" (An Thuyên)	Eliminated
5	Phương Ly	"Nhạc khúc tình yêu" (Kỳ Phương)	Eliminated
6	Nguyễn T. Phương Anh	"Không làm khác được" (Lương Bằng Quang)	Top 10
7	Trung Quân	"Bài ca tình yêu" (Thành Vương)	Top 10
8	Bích Phương	"Chuyện tình" (Anh Quân)	Top 10
9	Lân Nhã	"Bóng mưa" (Hồ Hoài Anh)	Top 10
10	Mai Hương	"Cánh buồm phiêu du" (Sơn Thạch)	Top 10

== Finals ==
The finals began two weeks after the semi-finals had concluded. Music journalist and host Đặng Diễm Quỳnh is added to the judging panel at the start of the finals.

Each week the finalists perform live on stage to a television audience. The contestant receiving the least viewers' votes is eliminated from the competition. Introduced for the first time this season is the ability of the judges to collectively override the voters' decision once, if they deem that a contestant has been voted-out prematurely. Should this option is activated, two contestants would be eliminated the following week instead of one.

=== Top 10 – Random choices ===
Mentor: Phương Vy

Order	Contestant	Song	Result
1	Đăng Khoa	"Anh trôi về em"	Bottom 3
2	Nguyễn T. Phương Anh	"Chơi vơi tôi ru tôi"	Eliminated
3	Lân Nhã	"Buồn ơi chào mi"	Safe
4	Bích Phương	"Hôm nay anh đến"	Safe
5	Trung Quân	"Căn gác trống"	Safe
6	Vương Linh	"Người đến bên tôi"	Safe
7	Lều Phương Anh	"Tìm lại giấc mơ"	Safe
8	Đức Anh	"Anh muốn"	Bottom 3
9	Mai Hương	"Khoảng trời của bé"	Safe
10	Uyên Linh	"Những lời buồn"	Safe

=== Top 9 – Pop/Rock ===
Mentor: Phương Thanh

Order	Contestant	Song	Result
1	Trung Quân	"Đừng khóc và đừng hứa"	Safe
2	Vương Linh	"Khúc mưa"	Eliminated
3	Bích Phương	"Với anh"	Bottom 3
4	Lân Nhã	"Thế thôi"	Safe
5	Uyên Linh	"Mùa đông sẽ qua"	Safe
6	Đức Anh	"Ngủ say nhé"	Safe
7	Lều Phương Anh	"Em không khóc"	Bottom 3
8	Đăng Khoa	"Có một chút"	Safe
9	Mai Hương	"Thu tình yêu"	Safe

=== Top 8 – R&B/Hip-hop/Dance ===
Mentor: Hồ Ngọc Hà

Order	Contestant	Song	Result
1	Lều Phương Anh	"Giận Anh"	Safe
2	Đức Anh	"Khúc mưa"	Bottom 3
3	Bích Phương	"Yêu"	Bottom 3
4	Đăng Khoa	"Lột xác"	Safe
5	Mai Hương	"Trôi trong gương"	Safe
6	Lân Nhã	"Độc bước"	Safe
7	Trung Quân	"Đôi mắt"	Eliminated
8	Uyên Linh	"Lời của ánh mắt"	Safe

=== Top 7 – International music ===
Mentor: Thanh Bùi

Order	Contestant	Song	Result
1	Bích Phương	"From Sarah with Love"	Eliminated
2	Uyên Linh	"Fallin'"	Safe
3	Lân Nhã	"Apologize"	Bottom 3
4	Lều Phương Anh	"How Do I Live"	Safe
5	Đức Anh	"Say It Right"	Bottom 3
6	Mai Hương	"I Have Nothing"	Safe
7	Đăng Khoa	"Somewhere Over The Rainbow"	Safe

=== Top 6 – Unforgettable songs ===
Mentor: Cẩm Vân

Order	Contestant	Song	Result
1	Đức Anh	"Điệp khúc tình yêu"	Eliminated
2	Mai Hương	"Nơi em gặp anh"	Bottom 3
3	Đăng Khoa	"Mặt trời bé con"	Safe
4	Uyên Linh	"Khát vọng"	Bottom 3
5	Lân Nhã	"Hồ trên núi"	Safe
6	Lều Phương Anh	"Em vẫn đợi anh về"	Safe

=== Top 5 – Diva night ===
Mentor: Mỹ Linh

Order	Contestant	Song	Result
1	Uyên Linh	"Trở lại tuổi thơ"	Eliminated^{1}
2	Lân Nhã	"Một mình"	Bottom 3
3	Đăng Khoa	"Ngày không mưa"	Withdrew
4	Lều Phương Anh	"Cho em một ngày"	Bottom 3
5	Mai Hương	"Một ngày mới"	Safe

=== Top 4 – Duets ===
Mentor: Thanh Lam
Result: Lân Nhã was eliminated

Order	Contestant	Song	Result
1	Uyên Linh and Mai Hương	"Anh mãi là"	Safe
2	Lân Nhã and Lều Phương Anh	"Tôi và em"	Lân Nhã eliminated
3	Mai Hương and Lều Phương Anh	"Một ngày mới sang"	Safe
4	Uyên Linh and Lân Nhã	"Phút giây ngọt ngào"	Lân Nhã eliminated

=== Top 3 – Judges' choice ===
Mentor: Siu Black

Order	Contestant	Song	Result
1	Uyên Linh	"Chỉ là giấc mơ"	Safe
2	Lều Phương Anh	"Cô gái đến từ hôm qua"	Eliminated
3	Mai Hương	"Hãy cho em gần bên anh"	Safe
4	Uyên Linh	"Đường cong"	Safe
5	Lều Phương Anh	"Những khi ta buồn"	Eliminated
6	Mai Hương	"I Love Music"	Safe

=== Finale – Contestant's choice, International music & Winner's single ===
Mentor: Hồng Nhung and Mỹ Linh

Order	Contestant	Song	Result
1	Mai Hương	"Trái tim âm nhạc"	Runner-up
2	Uyên Linh	"Sao chẳng về với em"	Winner
3	Mai Hương	"Hot n Cold"	Runner-up
4	Uyên Linh	"Take Me to the River"	Winner
5	Mai Hương	"Cảm ơn tình yêu" (winner's song)	Runner-up
6	Uyên Linh	"Cảm ơn tình yêu" (winner's song)	Winner

=== Grand Finale ===
The grand finale took place in Lan Anh Music Center. 2500 tickets out of over 3000 are invitational; therefore, some tickets left were scalped up to 500,000 to 700,000 VND each. The show started at 9 pm (local time) and were broadcast live on VTV3, VTV6, VTV9, YanTV and several local TV stations. Hồng Nhung and Mỹ Linh, previously mentors on the show, performed with the two finalists – Mai Hương and Uyên Linh. The show's judge Siu Black performed together with Nguyễn Thị Phương Anh. Phan Anh announced the winner of the season was Trần Nguyễn Uyên Linh from Ho Chi Minh city. Linh then performed the winning song Cảm ơn tình yêu.

==== Musical Performances ====
1. "Bèo dạt mây trôi" – AnB Group
2. "Giấc mơ Chapi" – Du Mục band
3. "Những nụ hôn rực rỡ" – Male Finalists
4. "Cô gái tự tin" – Female Finalists
5. "Hoa nắng" – Top 10 (excluding Mai Hương and Uyên Linh)
6. "Đừng ngồi trong bóng đêm" – Mai Hương
7. "Giấc mơ nào với tôi" – Uyên Linh
8. "Dại khờ" – Đức Anh and Đăng Khoa
9. "Phút giây ngọt ngào" – Lân Nhã and Lều Phương Anh
10. "Ly cafe ban mê" – Lân Nhã
11. "Căn gác trống" – Trung Quân
12. "Khao khát môi hồng" – Nguyễn Thị Phương Anh and Siu Black
13. "Đêm tình nhân" – Vương Linh and Bích Phương
14. "Một ngày mới" – Mai Hương and Hồng Nhung
15. "I Believe I Can Fly" – Uyên Linh and Mỹ Linh
16. "Anh mãi là" – Uyên Linh and Mai Hương
17. "Cảm ơn tình yêu" – Uyên Linh (later joined by the rest of top 10)

== Elimination chart ==
Legend
Female	Male	Top 10	Top 16

Safe	Bottom Three	Bottom Two	Eliminated	Withdrew

Stage:		Semi-Finals			Finals								
Week:		09/27	10/04	10/11	10/25	11/01	11/08	11/15	11/22	11/29	12/06	12/13	12/24
Place	Contestant	Result											
1	Trần Nguyễn Uyên Linh		Top 10						Btm3	Elim^{1}			Winner
2	Văn Mai Hương			Top 10					Btm2				Runner-Up
3	Lều Phương Anh		Top 10			Btm2				Btm2		Elim	
4	Trần Lân Nhã			Top 10				Btm2		Btm3	Elim		
5	Nguyễn Tấn Đăng Khoa	Top 10			Btm2					WD^{1}			
6	Lê Đức Anh	Top 10			Btm3		Btm3	Btm3	Elim				
7	Bùi Thị Bích Phương		Btm 3	Top 10		Btm3	Btm2	Elim					
8	Bùi Nguyễn Trung Quân			Top 10			Elim						
9	Đinh Vương Linh			Top 10		Elim							
10	Nguyễn Thị Phương Anh			Top 10	Elim								
11–14	Trần Phương Ly			Elim									
11–14	Hà Minh Nguyệt		Btm 2	Elim									
11–14	Nguyễn Văn Thắng			Elim									
11–14	Nguyễn Văn Viết	Btm 2		Elim									
15–16	Nguyễn Thị Thu Trang		Elim										
15–16	Y Jalin Ayun	Elim											

^{1} The official results had Uyên Linh eliminated from the show. However, Đăng Khoa, who was safe in this round, announced that he preferred to withdraw from the competition in her stead. This followed controversy from a released surreptitious recording of a conversation involving eliminated finalist Đức Anh insulting fellow eliminated contestants, judges, the media, and others. The fifteen-minute audio was first released onto the internet forums, and subsequently released onto websites like YouTube. Đăng Khoa has admitted to being the one who did the recording but has denied being the one who released the audio. On behalf of the Executive Producers and Judges of Vietnam Idol, Diễm Quỳnh accepted Khoa's request to withdraw; therefore, Uyên Linh was saved from elimination at the last moment and did not have to perform her exit song.

== Album ==
Years	Recording Artist	Informations
2010	Trung Quân	Quân Cartoon is Coming To Town: Released: December 22, 2011; Recording Label:
2011	Bích Phương (and Minh Hằng)	Ơ Hay: Released: 2011; Recording Label: Music Faces
2011	Văn Mai Hương	Hãy Mỉm Cười: Released: December 21, 2011; Recording Label:
2011	Uyên Linh	Giấc mơ tôi: Released: February 7, 2012; Recording Label: BHD Entertainment

=== Compilation album ===
This was the first season to produce a compilation album. All the tracks from the album were recorded in studio after the season ends.

Vietnam Idol 2010

Compilation album by Various Artists
- Released: January 2, 2011
- Recorded: 2010
- Genre: Pop
- Length: 40:28
- Label: BHD Film

No.	Title	Artist	Length
1.	"Cảm Ơn Tình Yêu"	Uyên Linh	4:29
2.	"Trôi Trong Gương"	Mai Hương	3:10
3.	"Chỉ Có Thể Là Tình Yêu"	Lều Phương Anh	4:23
4.	"Độc Bước"	Lân Nhã	3:35
5.	"Có Một Chút"	Đăng Khoa	4:25
6.	"Bất Chợt Một Tình Yêu"	Đức Anh	3:29
7.	"Những Giấc Mơ Dài"	Bích Phương	4:57
8.	"Căn Gác Trống"	Trung Quân	3:48
9.	"Rồi Ngày Mai Sẽ Đến"	Vương Linh	3:44
10.	"Không Làm Khác Được"	Nguyễn T. Phương Anh	4:28

== Result show performances ==
Week	Performer(s)	Title
Top 10	Phương Vy	"Nụ cười và những ước mơ"
Top 9	Phương Thanh and UnlimiteD	"Đừng nhìn lại"
Top 8	Hồ Ngọc Hà	"Thức tỉnh"
Top 7	Thanh Bui	"U & I"
Top 6	Cẩm Vân	"Khát vọng"
Top 5	Mỹ Linh	"Để mãi được gần anh"
Top 4	Thanh Lam	"Gọi anh"
Top 3	Mai Hương; Lều Phương Anh; Uyên Linh	"Hát" "Trót yêu anh rồi" "Gió"

== Cảm ơn tình yêu Live Show ==
Cảm ơn tình yêu Live Show was a concert featuring all of the season 3 finalists, except for Lều Phương Anh with personal reasons. The show was produced by Huy Tuấn, who was also the musical director of Vietnam Idol this season, and was sponsored by MobiFone. The concert was held in Hanoi on January 23, 2011.

=== Performers ===
Uyên Linh (Winner)	Mai Hương (2nd place)	Lân Nhã (4th place)
Đăng Khoa (5th place)	Đức Anh (6th place)	Bích Phương (7th)
Trung Quân (8th place)	Vương Linh (9th place)	Phương Anh (10th place)

=== Setlist ===
- Lân Nhã, Trung Quân, Phương Anh, Bích Phương, Vương Linh, Đức Anh and Đăng Khoa — - "Những nụ hôn rụ rỡ" (from the same name movie) and "Hoa nắng"
- Đức Anh — - "Bất chợt một tình yêu" (Nguyễn Đức Cường)
- Đăng Khoa — - "Dòng thời gian" (Nguyễn Hải Phong)
- Vương Linh & Bích Phương — - "Đêm tình nhân" (Phương Uyên & Lê Minh)
- Lân Nhã — - "Bóng mưa" (Hà Anh Tuấn)
- Lân Nhã & Phương Anh — - "Khúc giao mùa" (Mỹ Linh)
- Trung Quân featuring Thái Sơn (Top 24) — - "Bèo dạt mây trôi"
- Trung Quân — - "Căn gác trống" (Ưng Hoàng Phúc)
- Trung Quân & Mai Hương — - "Hồ Gươm sáng sớm" (Hoàng Hải)
- Mai Hương — - "Đừng ngồi yên trong bóng đêm" (from Giải cứu thần chết) and "Cánh buồm phiêu du" (Hồ Quỳnh Hương)
- Uyên Linh — - "Giận anh" (Phương Vy), "Take Me to the River" (Al Green), "Chỉ là giấc mơ" (Thanh Lam),
- Uyên Linh & Mai Hương — - "Anh mãi là" (Lưu Hương Giang)
- Uyên Linh & other performers — - "Cảm ơn tình yêu" (winning song)

Awards and achievements
Preceded by Lê Việt Anh with "Mây"	Vietnam in the ABU TV Song Festival; 2013; Văn Mai Hương with "Là anh đó" and Ngũ Cung with "Cao nguyên đá"	Succeeded by
