= Vietnam Idol season 1 =

Vietnam Idol
- Season 1
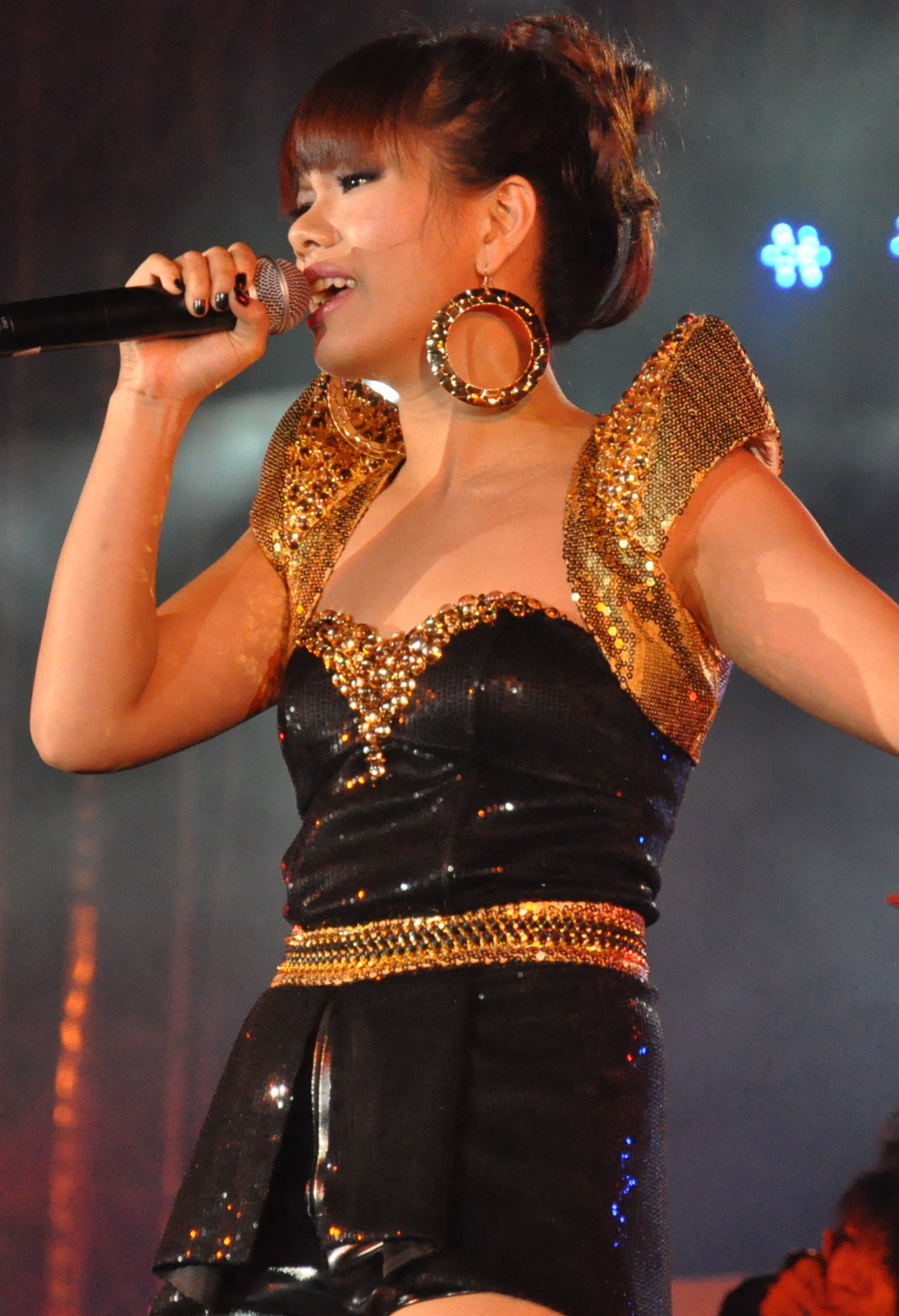
- Hosted by: Thanh Thảo
- Judges: Siu Black; Hà Dũng; Tuấn Khanh
- Winner: Phương Vy
- Runner-up: Ngọc Ánh
- Finals venue: Hòa Bình Theater, HCMC

Release
- Original network: Ho Chi Minh Television
- Original release: May 23 – October 3, 2007

Season chronology
- Next → Season 2

Vietnam Idol (now retroactively known as Vietnam Idol season 1) is the first season of the interactive reality series produced in Vietnam. The show was hosted by Thanh Thảo and Nguyên Vũ. It began airing on Ho Chi Minh Television together with many other local channels in Hanoi (HTV), Hai Phong, Da Nang (DRT), Khanh Hoa and Quang Ninh

Nguyễn Ngọc Phương Vy, from Ho Chi Minh City, was crowned the winner of the season. Her prizes included $10,000 and a contract with Music Faces, a record company in Vietnam.

== Early process ==
=== Auditions ===
Auditions were held at the following locations:

- Can Tho: April 7, 2007
- Hanoi: April 15, 2007
- Danang: April 22, 2007
- Ho Chi Minh City: May 5, 2007

=== Theater rounds ===
The contestants who passed the auditions, arrived in Ho Chi Minh City for the theater round where they were given songs from the judges to perform. Based on those performances, 30 contestants were chosen by the judges to proceed to the Piano Show.

=== Piano rounds ===
On the June 27, 2007, the Piano Show began, with the Top 30 Contestants singing in Ho Chi Minh City for the judges and the viewers. The contestants were allocated numbers so that viewers could vote for their favourite(s). The viewers were able to vote by phone or by SMS. Contestants were divided into three groups of ten with the top 3 contestants from each group advancing to the Gala Round. Eight from the three groups that did not proceed to the finals during the first three rounds, competed for the last position in the Top 10 during the Wildcards round.

=== Finals ===
The gala round involves the contestants singing each week, with the contestant with the fewest votes each week being eliminated, until one contestant is left and crowned Vietnam Idol 2007. Before it began Thùy Dương withdrew from the Top 10 due to health issues with Ngọc Minh replacing her as he had received the second highest number of votes in the Wildcards round.

=== Grand finale ===
On the 26th of September, the final two contestants, Phương Vy and Ngọc Ánh were given their last chance to sing for the votes of the Vietnamese public. The Grand Finale was held at Hoa Binh Theatre, Ho Chi Minh City on the 3rd of October. During the night, all Top 10 contestants returned to perform with other guest stars. With 53.44% of 723,024 votes, Phương Vy was announced the winner of Vietnam Idol 2007 ahead of Ngọc Ánh. As winner of Vietnam Idol she represented Vietnam in the Asian Idol competition.

== Finalists ==
(In order of elimination)

- Nguyễn Thị Thuỳ Dương, Hanoi (quit)
- Vũ Ngọc Bích, Hanoi
- Chung Thanh Phong, Ho Chi Minh City
- Trần Xuân Linh, Hanoi
- Nguyễn Thị Hải Yến, Hanoi
- Nguyễn Trà My, Hanoi
- Nguyễn Thị Thảo Trang, Ho Chi Minh City
- Trương Duy Khánh, Ho Chi Minh City
- Nguyễn Ngọc Minh, Hanoi
- Nguyễn Ngọc Ánh, Hà Tây (Runner-up)
- Nguyễn Ngọc Phương Vy, Ho Chi Minh City (Winner)

== Themes ==
- Week 1: Self-Expressing Songs

Original air: Aug 01 & 03 2007
Bottom 3: Ngọc Minh, Thanh Phong & Ngọc Bích
Eliminated: Ngọc Bích
Special guest(s):
Practised in:

- Week 2: Top Hits

Original air: Aug 08 & 10

Bottom 3: Ngọc Minh, Thanh Phong & Thảo Trang
Eliminated: Thanh Phong
Special guest(s):
Practised in:

- Week 3: World-Inspirational

Original air: Aug 15 & 17

Bottom 3: Ngọc Ánh, Ngọc Minh & Xuân Linh
Eliminated: Xuân Linh
Special guest(s):
Practised in:

- Week 4: Rock Night

Original air: Aug 22 & 24

Bottom 3: Duy Khánh, Thảo Trang & Hải Yến
Eliminated: Hải Yến
Special guest(s):
Practised in:

- Week 5: Trịnh Công Sơn

Original air: Aug 29 & 31

Bottom 3: Duy Khánh, Trà My & Thảo Trang
Eliminated: Trà My
Special guest(s):
Practised in:

- Week 6: Folk-Inspiration

Original air: Sep 05 & 07

'Bottom 2: Ngọc Minh, Thảo Trang
Eliminated: Thảo Trang
Special guest(s):
Practised in:

- Week 7: Judges' Choice

Original air: Sep 12 & 14

Top 4: Ngọc Ánh, Duy Khánh, Ngọc Minh & Phương Vy
Eliminated: Duy Khánh
Special guest(s):
Practised in:

- Week 8: I Raise My Voice for My Darlings

Original air: 19 & 21

Top 3: Ngọc Ánh, Ngọc Minh & Phương Vy
Eliminated: Ngọc Minh
Special guest(s):
Practised in:

- Week 9: Contestants' favourite

Original air: September 26

- Grand finale

Original air: October 3

'Final two: Ngọc Ánh & Phương Vy
'Winner: Phương Vy
Special guest(s): Top 10, Tuấn Hưng, Elvis Phương and other prominent music artists in Vietnam

== Elimination ==
Legends
Female	Male	Top 30	Wildcard	Top 10

Did not perform	Safe	Bottom 3	Bottom 2	Eliminated

Stage:		Semi-Finals			Wild; Card	Finals								
Week:		06/29	07/06	07/13	07/20	08/03	08/10	08/17	08/24	08/31	09/07	09/14	09/21	10/03
Place	Contestant	Result												
1	Phương Vy		Top 10											Winner
2	Ngọc Ánh		Top 10			Btm 2		Btm 3						Runner-Up
3	Ngọc Minh	Wild Card			Elim^{*}		Btm 2	Btm 2			Btm 2		Elim	
4	Duy Khánh			Top 10					Btm 3	Btm 3		Elim		
5	Thảo Trang		Top 10				Btm 3		Btm 2	Btm 2	Elim			
6	Trà My			Top 10						Elim				
7	Hải Yến			Wild Card	Top 10				Elim					
8	Xuân Linh	Top 10						Elim						
9	Thanh Phong	Top 10				Btm 3	Elim							
10	Ngọc Bích	Top 10				Elim								
11	Thùy Dương			Top 10	WD									
Wild Card	Tuấn Anh			Wild Card	Elim									
Wild Card	Hạ Trâm		Wild Card		Elim									
Wild Card	Cẩm Vân		Wild Card		Elim									
Wild Card	Khắc Tuận		Wild Card		Elim									
Wild Card	Nhật Thanh	Wild Card			Elim									
Wild Card	Đức Tiến	Wild Card			Elim									
Semi	Hữu Giang			Elim										
Semi	Phú Cường			Elim										
Semi	Phương Ly			Elim										
Semi	Hòa Mi			Elim										
Semi	Huyền Trang			Elim										
Semi	Thu Trang		Elim											
Semi	Thanh Đàn		Elim											
Semi	Hồ Tiến Đạt		Elim											
Semi	Đăng Thanh		Elim											
Semi	Huỳnh Mai	Elim												
Semi	Tấn Minh	Elim												
Semi	Bích Thảo	Elim												
Semi	Ái Thi	Elim												

- Before the finals occurred, Thuỳ Dương had stated that she was no longer in the competition due to her health, so Ngọc Minh was chosen to replace with the second highest votes in Wild Card.

=== Album ===
Years	Recording Artist	Informations
2008	Phương Vy	Lúc mới yêu: Released: March 8; Recording Label: Music Faces Records
2008	Trà My	Hãy nói anh yêu em: Released: May 9; Recording Label:
2008	Duy Khánh	Dối gian - Lỗi lầm: Released: May 23; Recording Label: Rạng Đông Audio & Video
2008	Thảo Trang	Lạ: Released: May 23; Recording Label:
2008	Võ Hạ Trâm	Hát: Released: November 14; Recording Label:
2009	Phương Vy	Có đôi lần: Released: April 23; Recording Label: Music Faces Records
2009	Hải Yến	Và anh đã đến: Released: July 7; Recording Label:
2009	Ngọc Ánh	Ngày hôm qua là thế: Released: August 12; Recording Label: DIHAVINA
2009	Ngọc Ánh	Giật mình: Released: August 12; Recording Label: DIHAVINA
