= Lúc mới yêu =

Studio album by Phương Vy
- Released: March 8, 2008 (Vietnam)
- Genre: Pop, R&B, jazz
- Label: Music Faces
- Producer: Đức Trí

Lúc mới yêu (English: Just Falling in Love) is the debut album by Vietnam Idol season 1 winner Phương Vy released on March 8, 2008. Following the success of Vietnam Idol, the album was highly anticipated. Phuong Vy sang the lead single off the album, "Lúc mới yêu" during the Asian Idol competition. As of May 2008, the album has sold about 15,000 copies.

== Track listing ==
1. "Lúc mới yêu"
2. "Leave Me Alone"
3. "Em biết"
4. "Như sương mai"
5. "Tình ngại"
6. "Những ngày thật khác"
7. "Ngày tháng quay về"
8. "Câu chuyện buồn"
9. "Khát khao của em"
10. "Những lời buồn"
11. "Nụ cười và những ước mơ"

== Singles ==
- "Lúc mới yêu"
- "Em biết"
- "Như sương mai"
- "Leave Me Alone"

== Music videos ==
- "Lúc mới yêu"
- "Em biết"
