= Vietnam Idol season 2 =

Vietnam Idol
- Season 2
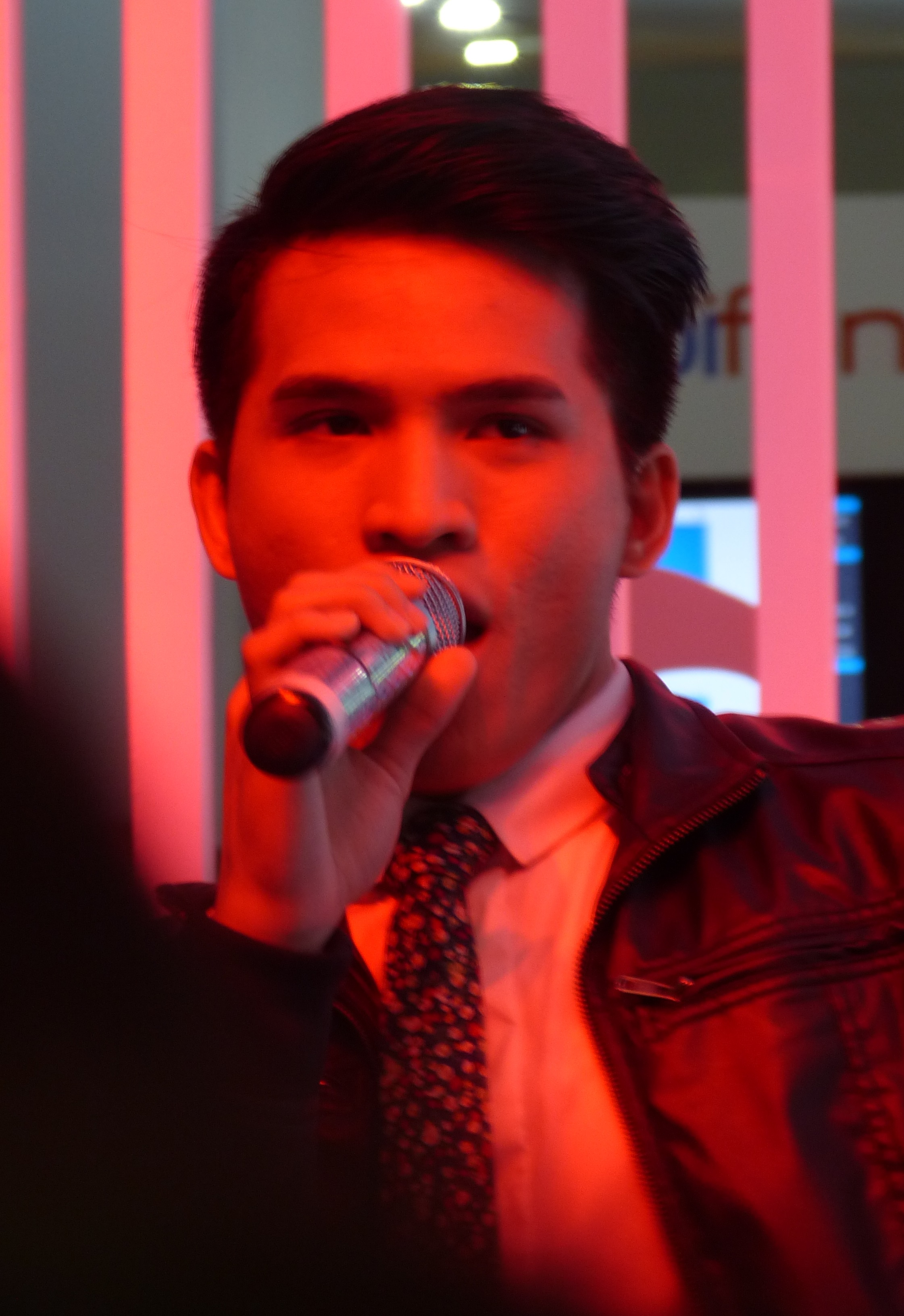
- Hosted by: Thanh Thảo; Sỹ Luân
- Judges: Siu Black; Hồ Hoài Anh; Trần Mạnh Tuấn
- Winner: Quốc Thiên
- Runner-up: Thanh Duy
- Finals venue: Hòa Bình Theater, HCMC

Release
- Original network: Ho Chi Minh Television
- Original release: 3 September 2008 – 14 January 2009

Season chronology
- ← Previous; Season 1 Next → Season 3

Vietnam Idol, season 2 was the second season of Vietnam Idol. This season was co-produced by Đông Tây Promotion, and Ho Chi Minh City Television. It aired on 3 September 2008 on HTV7 Channel with one episode per week, later raised to 2 episodes following the semi-finals.

Trần Quốc Thiên from Thống Nhất, Đồng Nai Province was crowned as the winner of the competition. He received $10,000 cash, a recording contract with Music Faces and multiple commercial contracts.

== Process ==
Following the success of the show, it was confirmed by producers that it would have Vietnam Idol air for a second season, but authorities subsequently postponed the contest until August.

The new season featured a different structure, with new host Sỹ Luân replacing Nguyên Vũ. The panel of judges was also changed, with new judges Hồ Hoài Anh and Trần Mạnh Tuấn joining Siu Black.

=== Audition Round ===
- Cần Thơ: 23 – 24 July 2008
- Hà Nội: 29 – 31 July 2008
- Đà Nẵng: 5 – 8 August 2008
- Hồ Chí Minh City: 14 – 16 August 2008

During the auditions, contestants were invited to perform the whole or part of a song to the producers, who decide whether they will perform to the judges. Unlike other Idol contests, the contestants are not notified immediately whether they will advance to the theater round by the judges, but must wait for the producers to contact them after the auditions. Unsuccessful contestants were not contacted.

=== Theater Round ===
The Theater Round involved the 94 contestants, who were invited to participate in Ho Chi Minh City in late August 2008. During this round, contestants were required to perform songs chosen by the producers of the contest.

=== Studio Round ===
From the 94 contestants, the Top 20 were chosen and placed into two groups according to gender. During a number of weeks, the two groups performed on alternating weeks, with viewers' votes ultimately deciding the Top 10.

List of the Top 20 below.

Females	Males
Cẩm Tú	Hoàng Anh
Duyên Anh	Lê Tuấn
Hà Ny	Mạnh Tuấn
Pha Lê	Ngọc Luân
Hương Trà	Phi Trường
Lan Trinh	Quốc Thiên
Minh Chuyên	Thanh Duy
Ngọc Bích	Trung Quân
Thu Hà	Tuấn Dũng
Thu Hà	Tuấn Nam

- Top 10 contestants have been highlighted

== Performance ==
Over the course of 8 weeks, the Top 10 contestants performed live. Each week the contestant with the least viewers' votes were eliminated from the contest. For the finals, "Vẫn hoài ước mơ" written by Đức Vượng was used as the exit song. The list below shows only the songs and the performances of the finalists.

Legend

Victory song Judges' choice	Song from the guests Eliminated songs

No.	Songs	Performed by	Written by
	Studio 1 (8 – 10 Oct)
1	Bóng mây qua thềm	Thanh Duy	Võ Thiện Thanh
2	Lời yêu xa	Quốc Thiên	An Hiếu
3	Đổi thay	Phi Trường	Kim Tuấn
4	Chuông gió	Lê Tuấn	Võ Thiện Thanh
5	Trống vắng	Hoàng Anh	Quốc Hùng
	Studio 2 (15 – 17 Oct)
6	Vũ điệu hoang dã (Wild Dances)	Duyên Anh	Hà Dũng
7	Giấc mơ của tôi	Cẩm Tú	Anh Quân
8	Sài Gòn Twist	Lan Trinh	Hồng Vân
9	Ngày của tôi	Thu Hà	Võ Thiện Thanh
10	Nuối tiếc	Minh Chuyên	Hồ Hoài Anh
	Studio 3 (22 – 24 Oct)
11	Tình 2000	Thanh Duy	Võ Thiện Thanh
12	Về ăn cơm	Quốc Thiên	Sa Huỳnh
13	Đường xưa	Phi Trường	Quốc Dũng
14	Dấu phố em qua	Lê Tuấn	Nguyễn Bình
15	Không bao giờ	Hoàng Anh	Tuấn Nghĩa
	Studio 4 (29 – 31 Oct)
16	Em muốn sống bên anh trọn đời	Thu Hà	Nguyễn Cường
17	Có nhớ đêm nào	Lan Trinh	Khánh Băng
18	Đôi chân trần	Cẩm Tú	Yfon K’sor
19	Tim anh trôi về em	Minh Chuyên	Quốc Bảo
20	Tóc hát	Duyên Anh	Võ Thiện Thanh
	Week 1: Self-Expressing Songs (12 – 14 Nov)
1	Nếu điều đó xảy ra	Lê Tuấn	Ngọc Châu
2	Niềm hy vọng	Thu Hà	Hà Dũng
3	Mưa	Phi Trường	Tuấn Nghĩa
4	Vô tình	Duyên Anh	Hà Dũng
5	Cánh buồm phiêu du	Quốc Thiên	Sơn Thạch
6	Khát khao tôi	Cẩm Tú	Dương Cầm
7	Tôi thích	Thanh Duy	Phương Uyên
8	Chia tay tình đầu	Minh Chuyên	Nguyễn Ngọc Thiện
9	Rock kẹt xe	Hoàng Anh	Anh Khanh
10	Cô gái tự tin	Lan Trinh	Hồ Hoài Anh
11	Vẫn hoài ước mơ	Top 10	Đức Vượng
12	Vẫn hoài ước mơ	Minh Chuyên	Đức Vượng
	Week 2: Current Pop (19 – 21 Nov)
1	Như là tình yêu	Hoàng Anh	Tuấn Khanh
2	Chuyện tình	Cẩm Tú	Composer: Anh Quân; Lyricist: Dương Thụ
3	Tình yêu không lời	Lê Tuấn	Thuận Yến
4	Yêu chỉ riêng mình anh	Thu Hà	Phương Uyên
5	Nằm mơ	Thanh Duy	Như Huy
6	Giấc mơ mang tên mình	Lan Trinh	Văn Phong
7	Ngôi sao nhỏ	Quốc Thiên	Tường Văn
8	Tóc nâu môi trầm	Duyên Anh	Quốc Bảo
9	Tình mãi theo ta	Phi Trường	Lê Quang
10		Top 9
11	Những mùa đông yêu dấu	Hoàng Anh	Đỗ Bảo
	Week 3: Melodies Before Time (26 – 28 Nov)
1	Sài Gòn	Duyên Anh	Y Vân
2	Mắt biếc	Phi Trường	Ngô Thụy Miên
3	Lạnh lùng	Lan Trinh	Composer: Đinh Việt Lang; Lyricist: Vạn Thuyết Linh
4	Dư âm	Quốc Thiên	Nguyễn Văn Tý
5	Ô mê ly	Thu Hà	Văn Phụng
6	Lệ đá	Lê Tuấn	Trần Trịnh & Hà Huyền Chi
7	Bài tango cho em	Thanh Duy	Lam Phương
8	Tình khúc chiều mưa	Cẩm Tú	Nguyễn Ánh
9	Thương nhau ngày mưa	Top 8	Nguyễn Trung Ca
10	Lời tôi hát	Lê Tuấn	Bảo Chấn
	Week 4: Folk-Inspirational Variations (3 – 5 Dec)
1	Cô thắm về làng	Lan Trinh	Giao Tiên
2	Son	Quốc Thiên	Đức Nghĩa
3	Đàn cò	Cẩm Tú	Lê Minh Sơn
4	Giấc phù du	Duyên Anh	Hà Dũng
5	Ngựa ô thương nhớ	Thu Hà	Trần Tiến
6	Cánh diều	Phi Trường	Ngọc Đại
7	Tát nước đầu đình	Thanh Duy	Y Vân
8	Tùy hứng lý qua cầu	Top 7	Trần Tiến
9	Nếu phải xa nhau	Phi Trường	Xuân Phương
	Week 5: Funky Songs (10 – 12 Dec)
1	Rock Sài Gòn	Quốc Thiên	Lâm Quốc Cường
2	Thời gian tôi	Cẩm Tú	Đức Trí & Võ Thiện Thanh
3	Bàn tay trắng	Lan Trinh	Nguyễn Hải Phong
4	Đám cưới chuột	Thu Hà	Gạt Tàn Đầy Band
5	Tình yêu bắt đầu	Thanh Duy	Nguyễn Dân
6	Tình yêu khó quên	Duyên Anh	Hoài An
7	Ngọn lửa trái tim	Top 6	Nguyễn Ngọc Thiện
8	Đường đến ngày vinh quang	Lan Trinh	Bức Tường
	Week 6: 1990s (17 – 19 Dec)
1	Cho em một ngày	Cẩm Tú	Dương Thụ
2	Bay vào trời xanh	Cẩm Tú	Dương Thụ
3	Một ngày mùa đông	Thanh Duy	Bảo Chấn
4	Thà làm hạt mưa bay	Thanh Duy	Thanh Tùng
5	Ước gì	Thu Hà	Võ Thiện Thanh
6	Tình phai	Thu Hà	Nguyễn Ngọc Tài
7	Nửa vầng trăng	Quốc Thiên	Nhật Trung
8	Tình yêu lung linh	Quốc Thiên	Hoài An
9	Sắc màu	Duyên Anh	Trần Tiến
10	Hãy trả lời em	Duyên Anh	Tuấn Nghĩa
11	Phố hoa	Top 5	Hoài An
12	Những phút giây qua	Thu Hà	Quốc Trường
	Week 7: Melodies on Christmas Eve (24 – 26 Dec)
1	Năm mới an lành (We Wish You a Merry Christmas)	Top 4
2	Hai mùa Noel	Thanh Duy	Nguyễn Vũ
3	Nắng hồng soi mắt em	Thanh Duy	Bảo Phúc
4	Bài thánh ca buồn	Quốc Thiên	Nguyễn Vũ
5	Ước mơ cho ngày mai	Quốc Thiên	Anh Tuấn
6	Tiếng yêu mùa đông	Duyên Anh	Quốc Vũ
7	Một trái tim, một quê hương	Duyên Anh	Phạm Trọng Cầu
8	Bài Noel tình yêu	Cẩm Tú	Dương Cầm
9	Nồng nàn Hà Nội	Cẩm Tú	Nguyễn Đức Cường
10	Noel ước mơ	Top 4	Quốc An
11	Mưa đêm	Cẩm Tú	Tuấn Hùng
	Week 8: I Raise My Voice for My Darlings (31 Dec – 2 Jan)
1	Mẹ tôi	Quốc Thiên	Nhị Hà
2	Guitar cho ta	Quốc Thiên	Lê Minh Sơn
3	Bóng cả	Duyên Anh	Vũ Quốc Việt
4	Khúc tự tình	Duyên Anh	Hà Dũng
5	Gia đình tôi	Thanh Duy	Phương Uyên
6	Tôi yêu	Thanh Duy	Phương Uyên
7	Điệp khúc mùa xuân	Quốc Thiên	Quốc Dũng
8	Thì thầm mùa xuân	Duyên Anh	Ngọc Châu
9	Lời tỏ tình của mùa xuân	Thanh Duy	Thanh Tùng
10	Xuân đã về	Top 3	Minh Kỳ
11	Mong ước kỷ niệm xưa	Duyên Anh	Xuân Phương
	Week 9: Judges' Choice (7 Jan)
1	Yêu đời	Thanh Duy & Quốc Thiên	Nguyễn Dân
2	Ghen	Thanh Duy	Trọng Khương; Nguyễn Bính
3	Dấu tình sầu	Quốc Thiên	Ngô Thụy Miên
4	Nghe mưa	Thanh Duy	Dương Thụ
5	Không còn mùa thu	Quốc Thiên	Việt Anh
6	Yêu trong ánh sáng	Thanh Duy	Quốc Bảo
7	Em sẽ là giấc mơ	Quốc Thiên	Lưu Thiên Hương
	Grand Finale (14 Jan)
1	Vẫn hoài ước mơ	Các thí sinh	Đức Vượng
2	Cho bạn cho tôi	Các thí sinh	Lam Trường
3	Điệp khúc mùa xuân	Thanh Duy & Quốc Thiên	Quốc Dũng
4	Lạnh lùng	Lan Trình	Đinh Việt Lang
5	Tình khúc chiều mưa	Cẩm Tú	Nguyễn Ánh
6	Ô mê ly	Thu Hà	Văn Phụng
7	Áo xanh	Lê Tuấn, Phi Trường, Thanh Duy & Quốc Thiên	Tuấn Khanh
8	Yêu dấu đã về	Hoàng Anh & Minh Chuyên	Minh Châu
9	Son	Quốc Thiên	Đức Nghĩa
10	Tôi thích	Thanh Duy	Phương Uyên
11	Lúc Mới Yêu	Phương Vy	Đức Trí
12	Một mình	Quốc Thiên & Quang Dũng	Thanh Tùng
13	Giọt nước mắt cho đời	Thanh Duy & Đàm Vĩnh Hưng	Lê Quang
14	Theng theng oh oi	Siu Black, pianist: Hồ Hoài Anh & saxophonist: Trần Mạnh Tuấn	Nguyễn Cường
15	Nụ cười và những ước mơ	Quốc Thiên & Phương Vy	Đức Trí

== Elimination chart ==
Legend
Female	Male	Top 10	Top 20

Did not perform	Safe	Bottom 3	Bottom 2	Eliminated

Stage:		Semi-Finals				Finals								
Week:		10/10	10/17	10/24	10/31	11/14	11/21	11/28	12/05	12/12	12/19	12/26	01/02	01/14
Place	Contestant	Result												
1	Quốc Thiên						Btm 3	Btm 2						Winner
2	Thanh Duy							Btm 3	Btm 2		Btm 2			Runner-Up
3	Duyên Anh									Btm 3			Elim	
4	Cẩm Tú										Btm 3	Elim		
5	Thu Hà				Btm 3	Btm 3			Btm 3	Btm 2	Elim			
6	Lan Trinh						Btm 2			Elim				
7	Phi Trường							Btm 4	Elim					
8	Lê Tuấn			Btm 3				Elim						
9	Hoàng Anh					Btm 2	Elim							
10	Minh Chuyên					Elim								
Semi	Hà Ny				Elim									
Semi	Ngọc Bích		Btm 4		Elim									
Semi	Trung Quân			Elim										
Semi	Ngọc Luân			Elim										
Semi	Hương Trà		Elim											
Semi	Pha Lê		Elim											
Semi	Thu Hà		Elim											
Semi	Tuấn Nam	Elim												
Semi	Tuấn Dũng	Elim												
Semi	Mạnh Tuấn	Elim												

== Grand Finale ==
The Grand Finale took place on 14 January 2009 at Hoa Binh Theatre. The Finale included a red carpet entrance and varied performances from the Top 10 contestants. The finale also included special performances from the winner of Vietnam Idol 2007 Phương Vy, Hà Hồ, Đàm Vĩnh Hưng, Quang Dũng and a notable collaboration between the three judges. With 61% of votes, Trần Quốc Thiên was announced the winner of Vietnam Idol Season 2. Thanh Duy was runner-up with 39% of votes.
