= Ya Suy =

Vietnamese singer

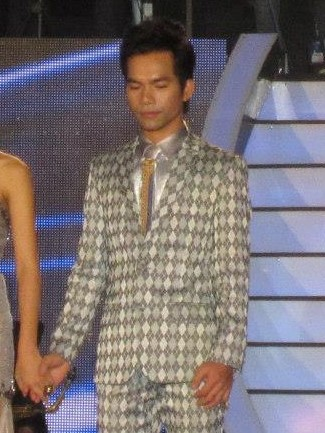

Background information
- Birth name: Ya Suy
- Born: 7 January 1987 (age 38); Lâm Đồng, Vietnam
- Instrument: Vocals
- Years active: 2013–present
- Website: yasuyfc.com

Ya Suy (born 7 January 1987) is a Vietnamese singer from Lâm Đồng. He won the fourth season of Vietnam Idol on 1 February 2013.

== Vietnam Idol ==
=== Performances/results ===
Episode	Theme	Song choice	Order #	Result
Audition	Contestant's Choice	"I'm Yours"	N/A	Advanced
Theater Round	Solo	"Nơi tình yêu bắt đầu"	N/A	Advanced
Theater Round	Group Performance	"Cảm ơn cuộc đời"	N/A	Advanced
Top 16	Personal Choice	"Trái tim bên lề"	6	Advanced
Top 10	Who Are You?	"Lặng thầm một tình yêu"	10	Safe
Top 9	Exciting Music	"Trở về"	9	Bottom 3
Top 8	We Are the World	"Hello"	4	Safe
Top 7	Đức Trí & Lưu Thiên Hương	"Anh sẽ nhớ mãi"	3	Safe
Top 6	Anh Quân & Võ Thiện Thanh	"Lại gần bên anh"	1	Safe
Top 6	No Love Song Music	"Chào buổi sáng"	5	Safe
Top 4	Duets	"Tình về nơi đâu" (with Hương Giang) "Khúc giao mùa" (with Bảo Trâm)	1; 2	Safe
Top 3	Contestant's Choice, Judges' Choice	"Ngày xưa em đến" "Tan biến"	2; 5	Safe
Finale	Contestant's Choice, Huy Tuấn's Choice, International Music	"Viết tình ca" "Nơi ấy" "What I've Done"	2; 4; 6	Winner

Preceded by Uyên Linh	Vietnam Idol winner 2012	Incumbent
