= Vietnam Idol =

Vietnamese reality television competition

- Logo used between 2007 and 2013
- Also known as: Thần tượng âm nhạc Việt Nam
- Created by: Simon Fuller
- Presented by: Duy Hải (2015); Phan Anh (2010, 2013, 2016); Quốc Minh (2016); Huy Khánh (2012–2013); Nguyên Vũ (2007); Thanh Thảo (2007–09); Sỹ Luân (2008–09); Bùi Đức Bảo (2023)
- Judges: Bằng Kiều (2016); Thanh Bùi (2015); Thu Minh (2015-16); Nguyễn Quang Dũng (2010-16, 2023); Trương Anh Quân (2013); Mỹ Tâm (2012-13, 2023-); Nguyễn Quốc Trung (2010–13); Siu Black (2007–10); Nguyễn Tuấn Khanh (2007); Hà Hùng Dũng (2007); Trần Mạnh Tuấn (2008–09); Hồ Hoài Anh (2008–09); Đặng Diễm Quỳnh (2010); Huy Tuấn (2023)
- Country of origin: Vietnam
- Original language: Vietnamese
- No. of seasons: 8
- No. of episodes: 128

Production
- Production companies: Đông Tây Promotion (2007–09); BHD (2010–2016); Cát Tiên Sa (2023); Fremantle; 19 Entertainment

Original release
- Network: HTV (2007–09); VTV (2010-2023)
- Release: May 23, 2007 – October 21, 2023

Vietnam Idol (Thần tượng âm nhạc: Vietnam Idol or Thần tượng âm nhạc Việt Nam from season five) is a Vietnamese reality television competition to find new solo singing talents. It is part of the Idol franchise; it originated from the reality program Pop Idol created by British entertainment executive Simon Fuller. Starting from season eight, the show is produced by Vietnam Television and Cát Tiên Sa.

== History ==
Vietnam Idol was created based on the British show Pop Idol and U.S. show American Idol. Đông Tây Promotion and its sponsor partner Unilever secured the format license for US$2 million, which was the highest licensing fee paid for a reality TV show in Vietnam at the time. The show debuted in 2007 in Vietnam under the name Thần tượng âm nhạc: Vietnam Idol ("music idol: Vietnam idol"), broadcast by Ho Chi Minh City Television under the production of Đông Tây Promotion. Due to declined ratings in season two, the TV station and production company lost the license to produce a season to BHD Corp. and Vietnam Television. From season 5, the show was retitled to the full Vietnamese title Thần tượng âm nhạc Việt Nam ("Vietnamese music idol") as per branding regulations set by Vietnam's Ministry of Culture, Sports and Tourism.

In 2017, BHD announced that the production of Vietnam Idol was on hiatus in hopes of "finding new talents" amidst a rise of new reality singing shows in Vietnam and fierce competition against existing formats including The X Factor and The Voice.

In January 2023, it was announced that the show would make a return to VTV3 with Cát Tiên Sa as the new production company.

== Series overview ==
=== Hosts and judges ===
In the first season, Vietnam Idol was co-hosted by Thanh Thảo and Nguyên Vũ. In the second season, Nguyên Vũ was replaced by Sỹ Luân. From season 3 onward, there was only one host per season. Phan Anh hosted the show in three non-consecutive seasons, the most out of all the hosts in the show's history.

Vietnam Idol maintained a 3-people panel across the series run except for season 3 when there were 4 judges. The panel usually consists of a singer, a producer and a composer.

Hosts/judges	Seasons							
Hosts/judges	1 (2007)	2 (2008–09)	3 (2010)	4 (2012–13)	5 (2013–14)	6 (2015)	7 (2016)	8 (2023)
Hosts
Thanh Thảo								
Nguyên Vũ								
Sỹ Luân								
Phan Anh^{[A]}								
Huy Khánh								
Duy Hải								
Đức Bảo								
Judges
Siu Black								
Tuấn Khanh								
Hà Dũng								
Hồ Hoài Anh								
Trần Mạnh Tuấn								
Nguyễn Quang Dũng								
Quốc Trung								
Đặng Diễm Quỳnh								
Mỹ Tâm								
Anh Quân								
Thu Minh								
Thanh Bui								
Bằng Kiều								
Huy Tuấn								

:^{A} In season 7, Phan Anh was the primary host throughout the season while Quốc Minh hosted the grand finale.

=== Season 1 (2007) ===
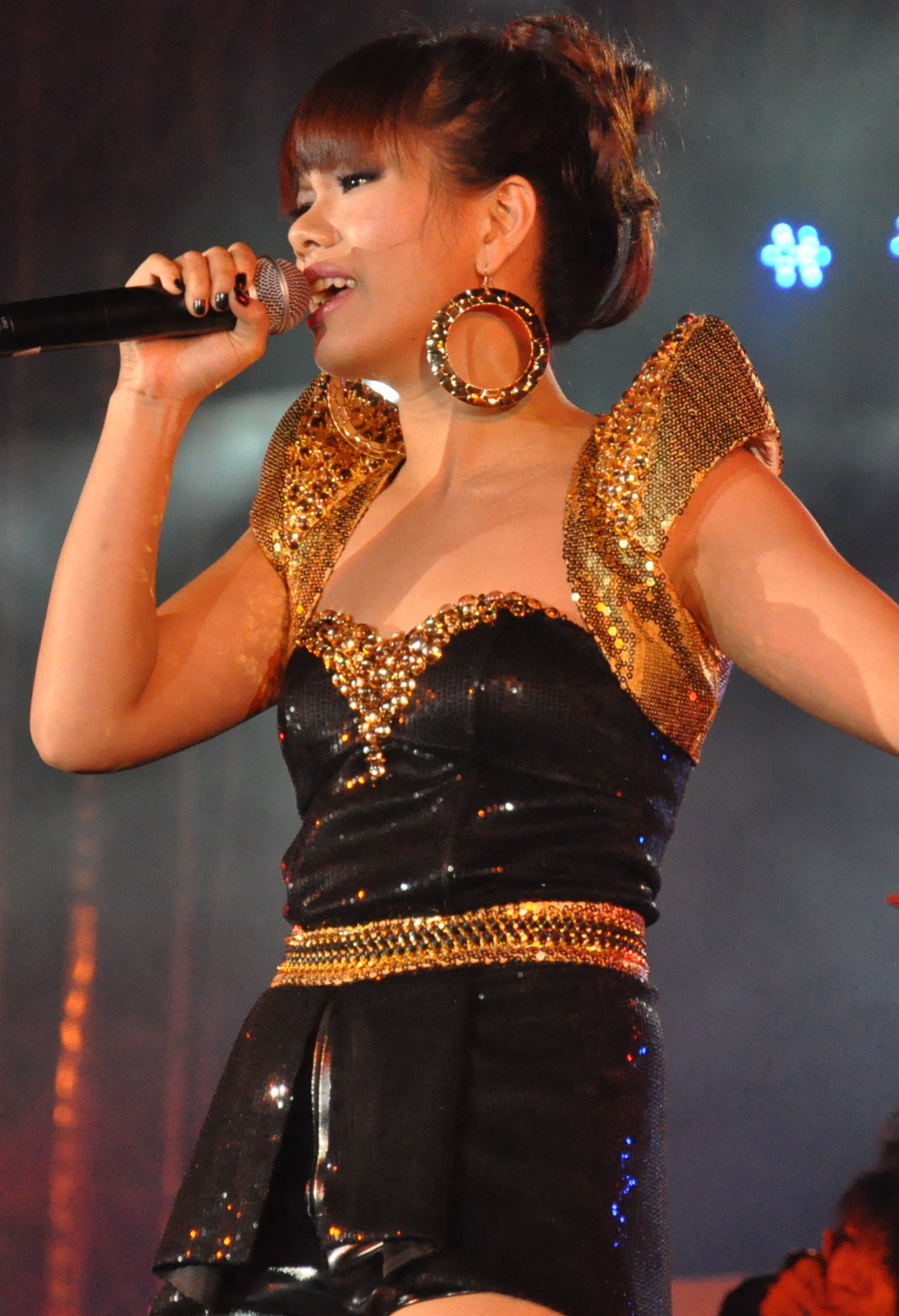
Phương Vy, season one winner

The first season of Vietnam Idol premiered on May 23, 2007, on HTV9. It was hosted by Thanh Thảo and Nguyên Vũ. The judges panel includes Siu Black, Tuấn Khanh and Hà Dũng. The grand finale was held on October 3, 2007, at Hòa Bình Theater with Phương Vy crowned the winner over Ngọc Ánh; Vy then sang her coronation song "Nụ cười và những ước mơ" (Smiles and Dreams) but did not release it as her single. Over 720,000 votes were counted for the finale and this was the only season to announce the number of votes. Phương Vy, Ngọc Ánh, Thảo Trang, Trà My, Duy Khánh released their solo albums afterwards and enjoyed moderate success after the show.

=== Season 2 (2008–09) ===
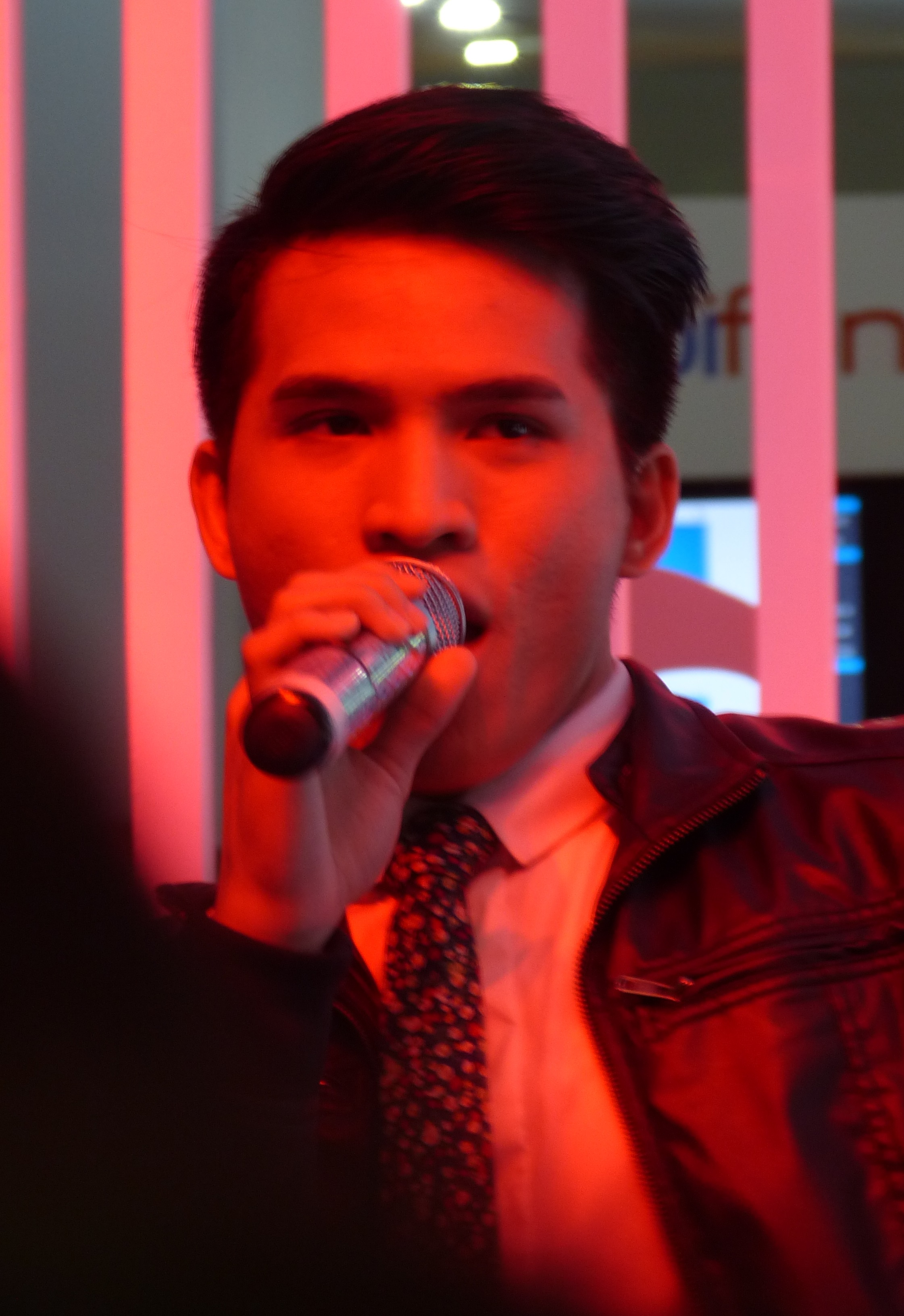
Quốc Thiên, season two winner

Following the success of season one, it was confirmed by the producers that Vietnam Idol had been renewed for a second season with auditions would take place in June. However, the authorities subsequently postponed the contest until late July, early August, stating that there were many similar contests on HTV from then to the year's end and the event was not suitable in the country's current social and economic situation. As a result, auditions commenced a month later than the original schedule. The season premiered on September 3 on HTV7. Sỹ Luân replaced Nguyên Vũ in season 1 to co-host the show with Thanh Thảo. The judges panel welcomed Hồ Hoài Anh and Trần Mạnh Tuấn as two new judges along with the original judge from season one - Siu Black.

At the Grand Finale, Quốc Thiên was announced the winner, taking the title over Thanh Duy. The coronation song for season one "Nụ cười và những ước mơ" was used again for this season.

=== Season 3 (2010) ===
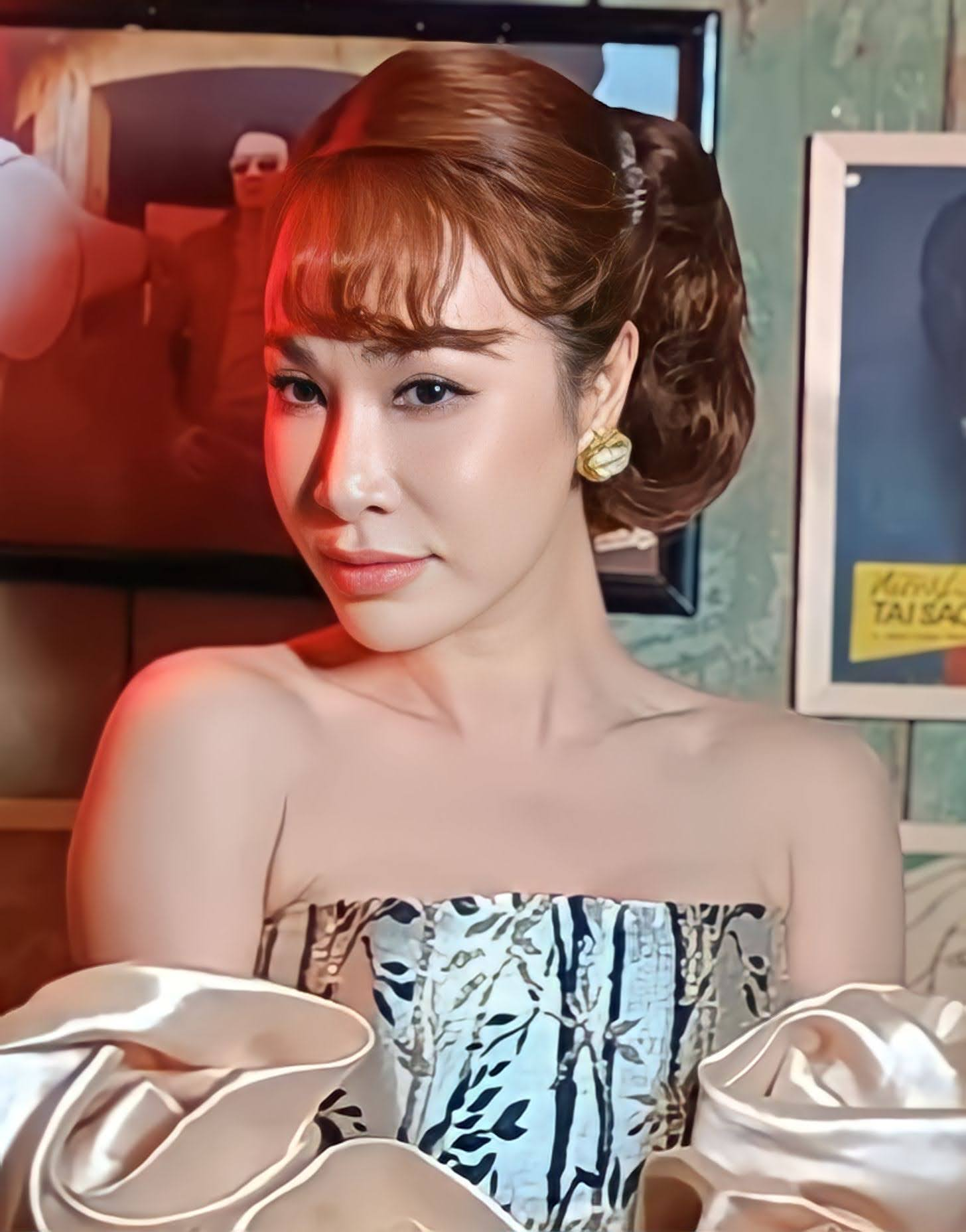
Uyên Linh, season three winner

After the show took a one-year break in 2009, it was renewed for a third season in 2010. The biggest change is the production team of the Vietnam Television and BHD film studio took over the production of the series from previous producers HTV and Đông Tây Promotion. Siu Black returned as a judge while Nguyễn Quang Dũng, Quốc Trung and Đặng Diễm Quỳnh replaced Hồ Hoài Anh and Trần Mạnh Tuấn. Phan Anh took over as the season's sole host. While nearly 40,000 people signed up for the contest only 25,000 arrived to audition. This season followed the same structure as season 9 of American Idol, introducing "Save" option, inviting mentors for each round. The winner gets a recording contract with BHD Entertainment instead of Music Faces Records as in the previous seasons. The semi-final and final rounds were filmed at BHD Pictures Studio and the grand finale took place in Lan Anh Music Center.

At the Grand Finale, Uyên Linh was announced the winner, taking the title over Mai Hương. Linh then performed a new coronation song called "Cảm ơn tình yêu" (Thanks for Love) and released the song as her debut single a week later.

Uyên Linh and Văn Mai Hương achieved significant media attention after the season ended. Both Linh and Hương have reached number one on Vietnamese Favorite Song chart. Other alumni in season 3 also went on to enjoy notable mainstream success like Trung Quân and Bích Phương, who both have spawned many well-received hits since mid 2010s.

=== Season 4 (2012–13) ===
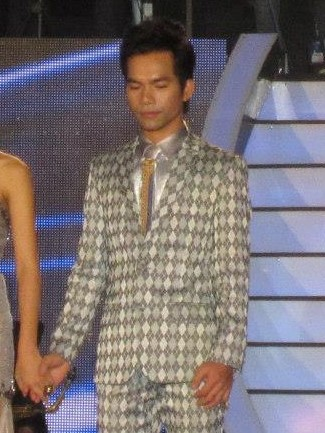
Ya Suy, season four winner

It was officially confirmed that the show would return for the fourth season. Siu Black ruled herself out of returning to judges' table only before the official press conference. On May 29, it was publicly unveiled the new judging panel, the new format and some changes. Mỹ Tâm replaced Siu Black, after her departure while Huy Khánh replaced Phan Anh as the host. Auditions started in June 2012. Broadcast commenced on Friday, August 17, 2012, at 8PM slot, replacing The Amazing Race Vietnam.

On February 1, 2013, the Grand Finale took place in Quân khu 7 Stadium. Ya Suy was crowned as the season winner over Hoàng Quyên. The season's coronation song was "Giây phút khát khao" (The Moment of Aspiration). After the season, Ya Suy's singing career was relatively inactive. He released his first single "Về với lúa" in late 2013 and proceeded to release two more singles in 2014 and 2017 before announcing his retirement from singing due to an issue with his vocals in April 2018.

=== Season 5 (2013–14) ===
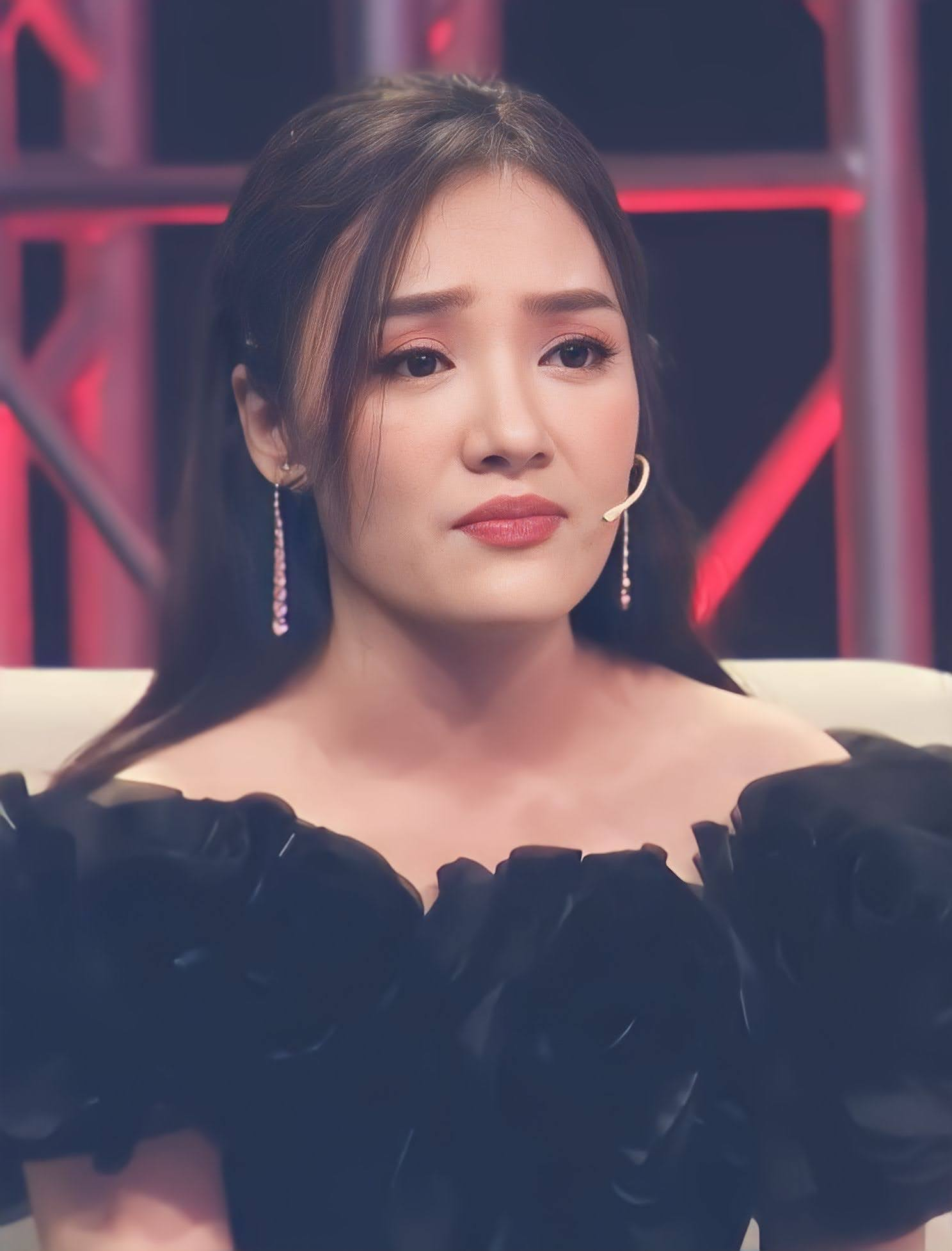
Nhật Thủy, season five winner

Nguyễn Quang Dũng and Mỹ Tâm was confirmed to come back for the fifth season while Anh Quân was introduced as a new judge. Phan Anh returned as the host, replacing Huy Khánh from season 4. The season ran every Sunday from December 15, 2013, to May 11, 2014, at 8 pm. The season's top two were Trần Nhật Thủy and Trần Thị Thùy (stage name Minh Thùy). At the end of the finale, Phan Anh announced that Nhật Thủy received 52% of the vote, effectively becoming the winner of season 5.

Thủy released her first album entitled "Tỉnh giấc" (Awakening) in 2015. The album was a part of a project called Young Hit Young Beat, initiated by Vietnamese diva Mỹ Linh, former Vietnam Idol judge Anh Quân and Vietnam Idol's music director Huy Tuấn.

=== Season 6 (2015) ===
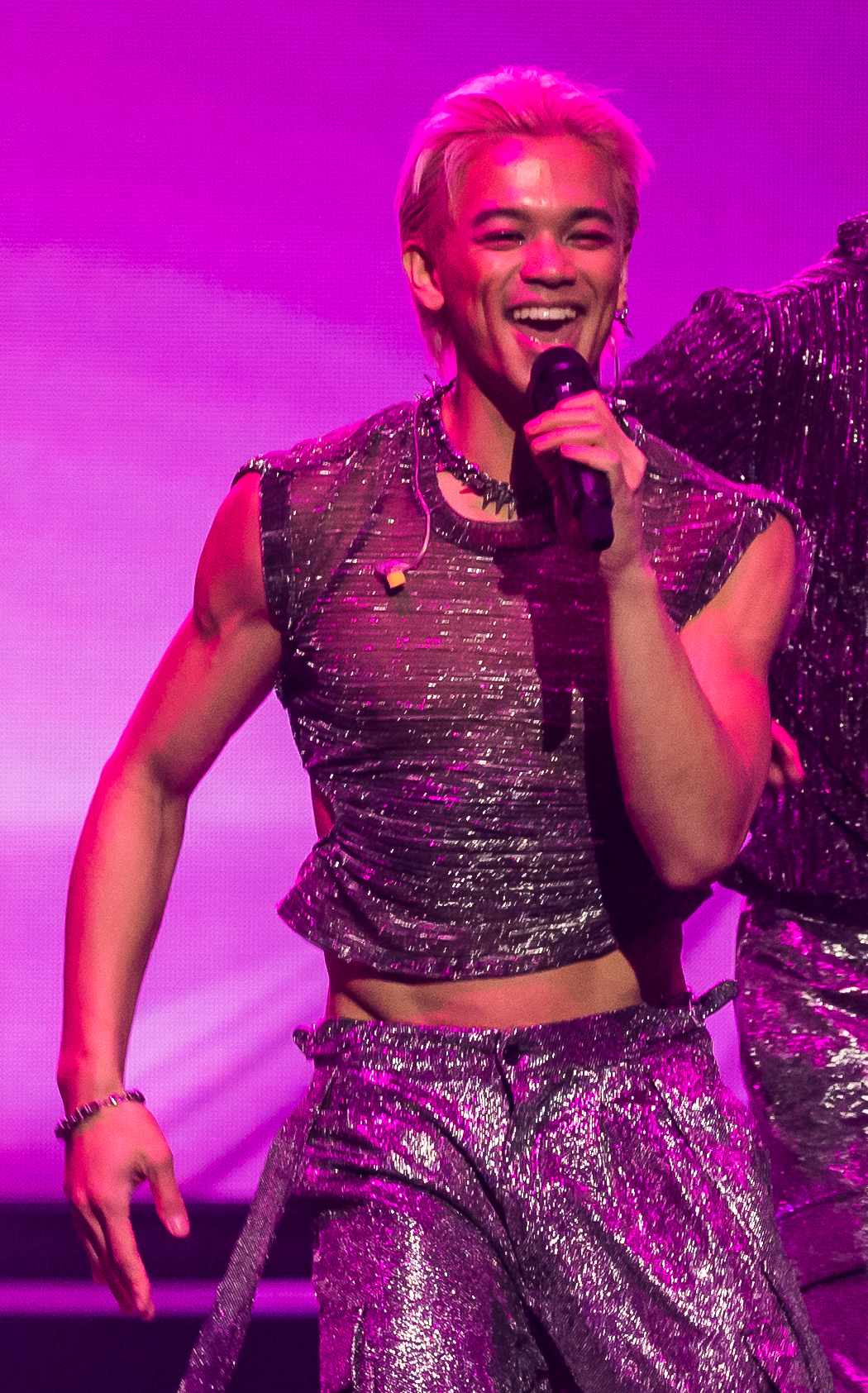
Trong Hieu, season six winner

Two new judges of this season were Thanh Bui and Thu Minh; Thanh Bùi replaced Anh Quân and Thu Minh replaced Mỹ Tâm. Duy Hải became the new host. Broadcast commenced on Sunday, April 5, 2015, at 8PM.

Nguyễn Trọng Hiếu, having received 71.5% of the audience's vote, was declared the winner over runner-up Nguyễn Bích Ngọc. Trọng Hiếu, born in Germany and having been placed top 25 in season 5 of the German version, was the first foreign winner in the show's history. Hiếu's winning song "Con đường tôi" (My way) was subsequently released as a single in both Vietnamese and German.

=== Season 7 (2016) ===
For season 7, Bằng Kiều replaced Thanh Bui on the judging panel while Phan Anh returned for his third season hosting the show. The season ran from May 27, 2016, to September 30, 2016, every Friday at 9.10 pm.

For the second season in a row, a foreigner was named Vietnam Idol as Janice Aranjuez Buco (stage name Janice Phương) from the Philippines received 54.25% of the votes, beating Phạm Việt Thắng's 45.75%. Janice released her coronation song "Love You in Silence", which contains lyrics in both English and Vietnamese language, as a single after the show.

Post-season, Janice released a new Vietnamese-language singled called "Tâm tư" (Feelings) in 2017. Janice cited language barriers as to why she had yet to make a breakthrough in Vietnamese music industry.

=== Season 8 (2023) ===
Ha An Huy, from Hanoi was named as the winner of the eighth season of Vietnam Idol, which ended in HCM City on Saturday evening October 21st, 2023.

After a convincing finale, fans were extremely excited to dig up Ha An Huy's performance "Like you a little too much" that caused a storm on the internet during the top 15 competition night, the song is considered the work that gave the name. Ha An Huy's age gets closer to the audience.

Many viewers also commented happily that viewers may not regularly watch Vietnam Idol, but Ha An Huy's performance "Like you a little too much" at the show is definitely something you should know.

Because this is the song that best demonstrates the musical maturity of the male contestant, making My Tam exclaim, "I like Anh Huy a lot." Currently on Youtube the song has reached more than 1,6 million views; on Facebook 26,6 thousand favorites with more than 2 thousand positive shares.

In particular, the male contestant confidently showed off his "rapping" talent. Commenting on Ha An Huy's performance, the powerful trio did not contribute too much because the male contestant maintained very good performance every night.

At the Vietnam Idol 2023 contest, with the strategy of singing all songs familiar to the audience and songs composed by himself. An Huy successfully debuted with the self-composed song "Roi" in the qualifying round, then continued with an elaborate remix of "Roi" to conquer the championship position with the song Stranger.

The young singer-songwriter had excellent performances and triumphed over competitors, Ha Minh and Lam Phuc with the highest votes accounting for more than 43.7 percent.

Huy previously won the third season of Big Song Big Deal songwriting contest which took place from September 2022 to February 2023. He can play a number of musical instruments and is highly appreciated for his music composition skills.

== Season details ==
Season	Premiere date	Finale date	Winner	Runner-up	Other contestants in order of elimination	Number of contestants
1	23 May 2007	3 October 2007	Nguyễn Ngọc Phương Vy	Nguyễn Ngọc Ánh	Vũ Ngọc Bích, Chung Thanh Phong, Trần Xuân Linh, Nguyễn Thị Hải Yến, Nguyễn Trà My, Nguyễn Thị Thảo Trang, Trương Duy Khánh, Nguyễn Ngọc Minh	10
2	3 September 2008	14 January 2009	Trần Quốc Thiên	Phạm Trần Thanh Duy	Nguyễn Thị Minh Chuyên, Trần Hoàng Anh, Giáp Lê Tuấn, Đinh Ứng Phi Trường, Nguyễn Võ Lan Trinh, Nguyễn Thị Thu Hà, Nguyễn Thị Cẩm Tú, Nguyễn Duyên Anh	10
3	21 August 2010	25 December 2010	Trần Nguyễn Uyên Linh	Văn Mai Hương	Nguyễn Phương Anh, Đinh Vương Linh, Bùi Nguyễn Trung Quân, Bùi Thị Bích Phương, Lê Đức Anh, Nguyễn Tấn Đăng Khoa (withdrew), Trần Lân Nhã, Lều Phương Anh	10
4	17 August 2012	1 February 2013	Ya Suy	Hoàng Lệ Quyên	Nguyễn Thanh Hưng, Trần Huỳnh Thanh Trúc, Phạm Hồng Phước, Nguyễn Anh Quân, Nguyễn Thanh Tùng & Cao Thanh Thảo My, Nguyễn Hương Giang, Nguyễn Thị Bảo Trâm	10
5	15 December 2013	11 May 2014	Trần Nhật Thủy	Trần Thị Thùy	Trần Anh Quân, Lê Thị Hải Yến, Nguyễn Ngân Hà, Trần Phú Hiển, Nguyễn Tiến Việt, Nguyễn Khánh Phương Linh, Nguyễn Đông Hùng	9
6	5 April 2015	2 August 2015	Nguyễn Trọng Hiếu	Nguyễn Bích Ngọc	Nguyễn Ngọc Khánh Tiên, Nguyễn Ngọc Việt, Phạm Nguyễn Duy, Trần Thúy Vân Quỳnh, Trần Hà Nhi, Bùi Minh Quân	8
7	27 May 2016	30 September 2016	Janice Aranjuez Buco	Phạm Việt Thắng	Y Lux, Đỗ Hồng Trà My, Ngô Thanh Huyền, Hoàng Thiên Minh Trị, Trần Bá Duy, Nguyễn Tùng Dương, Nguyễn Ngọc Thảo Nhi, Đinh Quang Đạt	10
8	8 July 2023	21 October 2023	Hà An Huy	Nguyễn Lâm Phúc	Xuân Định K.Y, Thanh Thảo (Muộii), Vũ Hiền (Hellen), Diễm Hằng (Lamoon), Hương Linh (PiaLinh), Thu Thủy (Annie), Lê Khoa	10
8	8 July 2023	21 October 2023	Hà An Huy	Nguyễn Hà Minh	Xuân Định K.Y, Thanh Thảo (Muộii), Vũ Hiền (Hellen), Diễm Hằng (Lamoon), Hương Linh (PiaLinh), Thu Thủy (Annie), Lê Khoa	10

== Controversies ==
The show has been criticized for alleged voting irregularities and lack of transparency. Major newspapers such as Thanh Niên and Tuổi Trẻ ran stories about votes for a contestant being counted for another contestant, though there was no concrete evidence to verify this claim, and the organisers stated that the results were not tampered with. While the organizers maintain that allowing up to 500 votes per phone number and not publicly tallying votes are standard practices seen in other Idol versions, they have been accused of doing so to maximize profits at the expense of fairness. Furthermore, there were rumors about contestants' relationship with one of the judges and the PR manager of Vietnam Idol. A public auditor from the Singaporean auditing firm Paul Hooi & Co. was hired to audit the vote counting process during the final.
