= Asian Idol =

Reality singing competition

- Asian Idol title card
- Created by: Simon Fuller
- Presented by: Amelia Natasha; Daniel Mananta; Soo Kui Jien
- Judges: Anu Malik; Indra Lesmana; Paul Moss; Pilita Corrales; Ken Lim; Siu Black
- No. of episodes: 2

Production
- Producer: Sandra Fulloon
- Production locations: Jakarta International Expo, Indonesia

Original release
- Network: MediaCorp Channel 5
- Release: 15 December – 16 December 2007

Asian Idol is a reality singing competition, which featured winners of Idol competitions from six Southeast and South Asian countries consisting of India, Indonesia, Malaysia, Philippines, Singapore, and Vietnam. Part of the Idol franchise, it originated from the reality program Pop Idol created by British entertainment executive Simon Fuller, which was first aired in 2001 in the United Kingdom. The first season was won by Singapore Idol Hady Mirza, who was awarded an all-expense-paid trip around the world on business class, after almost two million votes were cast.

The first season was held on 15 December and 16, 2007, in Jakarta, Indonesia. RCTI (which also broadcasts Indonesian Idol), was the main broadcaster, with the program shown live among participating countries.

== Season 1 ==
The first season was hosted by Amelia "Ata" Natasha and Daniel Mananta, both from Indonesian Idol, and Malaysian Idol's Soo Kui Jien.

Each participating country had its own system of determining its representative.

As a kickoff to Asian Idol, all six contestants were introduced through a special presentation called Road to Asian Idol on 8 December 2007. Meanwhile, fans of each contestant were able to choose the song they wanted their Idol to perform before the Asian Idol performance show. The Idols performed two songs each—one in English and another in their native language.

In addition to the coverage of Asian Idol, RCTI ran a series of features called Asian Idol Extra between late November to mid-December 2007.

Every competing country sent a judge to serve as the contestants' critics, but comments from only three judges on each performer were shown due to time constraints.

Special guests in the Results Show included American Idol winner Taylor Hicks, Australian Idol winner Guy Sebastian, Indian Idol judge Alisha Chinai, and Vietnam Idol judge Siu Black. It also featured performances by Rivermaya, Peterpan.

The production of Asian Idol was put up with the help of the production crew from Australian Idol.

=== Participation details ===
The table below lists the contenders in Asian Idol and the songs that each performed. It also lists the representative judges and the TV networks that participated in the show. Kazakhstan's franchise is also listed below because it was originally in the line-up of countries for the show. Gold background indicates the winner of the competition and the songs performed.

Asian Idol Franchise	Representative Idol	English song	Native language song (with English translation of title)	Representative judge	Participating network
Indian Idol	Abhijeet Sawant; Season 1 Winner	(Everything I Do) I Do It for You	Junoon (Obsession)	Anu Malik	Sony TV
Indonesian Idol	Mike Mohede; Season 2 Winner	I Believe I Can Fly	Mengejar Matahari (Chasing the Sun)	Indra Lesmana	RCTI
SuperStar KZ	Originally in the lineup but failed to send a representative among its four winners.				
Malaysian Idol	Jaclyn Victor; Season 1 Winner	For Once in My Life	Gemilang (Glory)	Paul Moss	8TV
Philippine Idol	Mau Marcelo; Season 1 Winner	Reach	Ako ang Nasawi, Ako ang Nagwagi (I'm the Defeated, I'm the Winner)	Pilita Corrales	ABC
Singapore Idol	Hady Mirza; Season 2 Winner	Beautiful Day	Berserah (Holding On)	Ken Lim	MediaCorp TV; Channel 5
Vietnam Idol	Phương Vy; Season 1 Winner	River Deep - Mountain High	Lúc Mới Yêu (Just Falling in Love)	Siu Black	HTV9

=== Voting procedures ===
There are several differences in voting and tabulation between Asian Idol and other Idol shows. Unlike the latter wherein the viewers get to vote for one contestant, the voting procedure for Asian Idol requires viewers to send SMS votes for two favorite Idols, thus allowing contestants to receive votes aside from their respective countries.

As consideration on population size among the participating countries, tabulation of votes are done through an "Equal and Even Cumulative Method", wherein the total votes of each country are converted into percentages. The winner was said to be determined through 50% viewers' votes and 50% judges' scores, but this was not confirmed during the program.

=== Partial results ===
Daniel Hartono, project manager of Asian Idol, revealed during a press conference that Mohede received the highest number of actual votes at approximately one million in total. However, because of the show's voting process where 50% of votes per country goes to the second option Idol, Mohede's votes were slashed by half and total percentages of votes from other participating countries were added. Hady, meanwhile, got the highest number of "second option votes". In total, Hady got 115% while Mohede is in second place with 111% and Victor got the fewest votes. The rankings of other contestants were not revealed.

=== Telecast schedule ===
To address differences in time zones (and in some cases, telecast dates), shows about Asian Idol was broadcast on different time slots and dates depending on the country. For instance, viewers in Indonesia, Philippines, and Malaysia, watched Road to Asian Idol on 8 December 2007, while it was shown in Vietnam on 9 December 2007. Viewers in India and Singapore watched the preview program on 14 December 2007.

The Performance Night was taped on 12 December 2007, in Hall D2 of Arena Pekan Raya Jakarta. This program was seen first by viewers in Vietnam on 14 December 2007, followed by viewers in other participating countries on 15 December 2007, although in different time slots depending on time zones.

The Results Show, meanwhile, was shown "live" on 16 December 2007, with varying time slots, depending on time zones.

=== Pre-event activities ===
The contestants for Asian Idol participated in activities promoting the program during their stay in Jakarta. On 7 December 2007, the contestants donated Rp12,985,000 (roughly US$1,500) to RCTI's Jalinan Kasih (Love Line Foundation) in Jakarta's Borobodur Hotel. A day later, they visited the presidential palace of Indonesia's President Susilo Bambang Yudhoyono in Bogor.

=== Controversies ===
Sandeep Acharya, the second-season winner of Indian Idol, was dismayed over Sawant's selection to compete in Asian Idol. He claimed that Sony TV India, the broadcaster of Indian Idol, was supposed to hold a competition among its three winners to determine India's representative and he felt he was bypassed.

Network representatives clarified that although they have the option to choose their representative, they were toying the idea of competing the three Indian Idol winners—including season 3 winner Prashant Tamang. However, it was cancelled due to scheduling conflicts.

There were reports of disrupted voting lines the Philippines, making SMS votes delayed by as much as eight hours until the morning of 16 December 2007. According to representatives of ABC, the Philippine broadcaster of Asian Idol, the glitch was caused by "a clog in the telephone companies".

=== Reactions ===
Hady Mirza's win came as a surprise, as at least three of the judges predicted that the winner would either be Marcelo, Mohede, or Victor.

There were claims that Hady may have gotten the crucial second vote outside of his home country, wherein it is claimed that votes for strong candidates were paired with weak ones like Hady and Sawant who were trailing in Asian Idol's online survey. This voting tactic was said to avoid viewers' home Idols be beaten by their closest rivals.

In Singapore, the victory stirred hopes of a revival of the country's golden age of music during the 1960s and 70's. Taufik Batisah, first season winner of Singapore Idol, said that the win is something their country should be proud of and hopefully this would "open the eyes and ears" of listeners. However, there were viewers in Singapore who still doubt Hady's singing ability, claiming that his performance in Asian Idol was not as strong as other competitors and it was a matter of "luck over talent". Singapore Idol judge Ken Lim reiterated that "looks and voice" had won the title for Hady.

Meanwhile, Hady shrugged off speculations that he won because he was a "non-threat", but considered himself an underdog and that he did "pretty well" in terms of sincerity and connecting with the audience.

Filipino TV and movie critic Nestor U. Torre mentioned that he was not surprised about Hady's win, even lauding him for his "impressively cool yet dynamic" performances. He also appreciated Victor and Phuong Vy's performances. While Torre was also equally impressed by Marcelo and Mohede's voices, he also said that their girth worked to their disadvantage. On Sawant, Torre noted that his "balladeer" projection was "less dynamic" with his country's large voting population failing him. Despite the surprises and disappointments in the competition, Torre regarded Asian Idol a success as it produced relatively new talents in the Asian and international music scene.

== Season 2 ==
Fotini Paraskakis, FremantleMedia Asia's production director (which holds the Idol franchises in the Philippines, India, Indonesia, Vietnam, Singapore, and Malaysia) reported that the second season would not take place in 2008, and was planning to launch on 2009 due to several reasons (Kazakhstan, Malaysian and Singapore franchises ended, relaunch of the Philippine franchise, delayed launch of India and Vietnam, cancellation of the Pakistan franchise). Thailand (which will have its franchise soon) is reported to participate in the event.
