= Uyên Linh =

Vietnamese pop singer (born 1987)

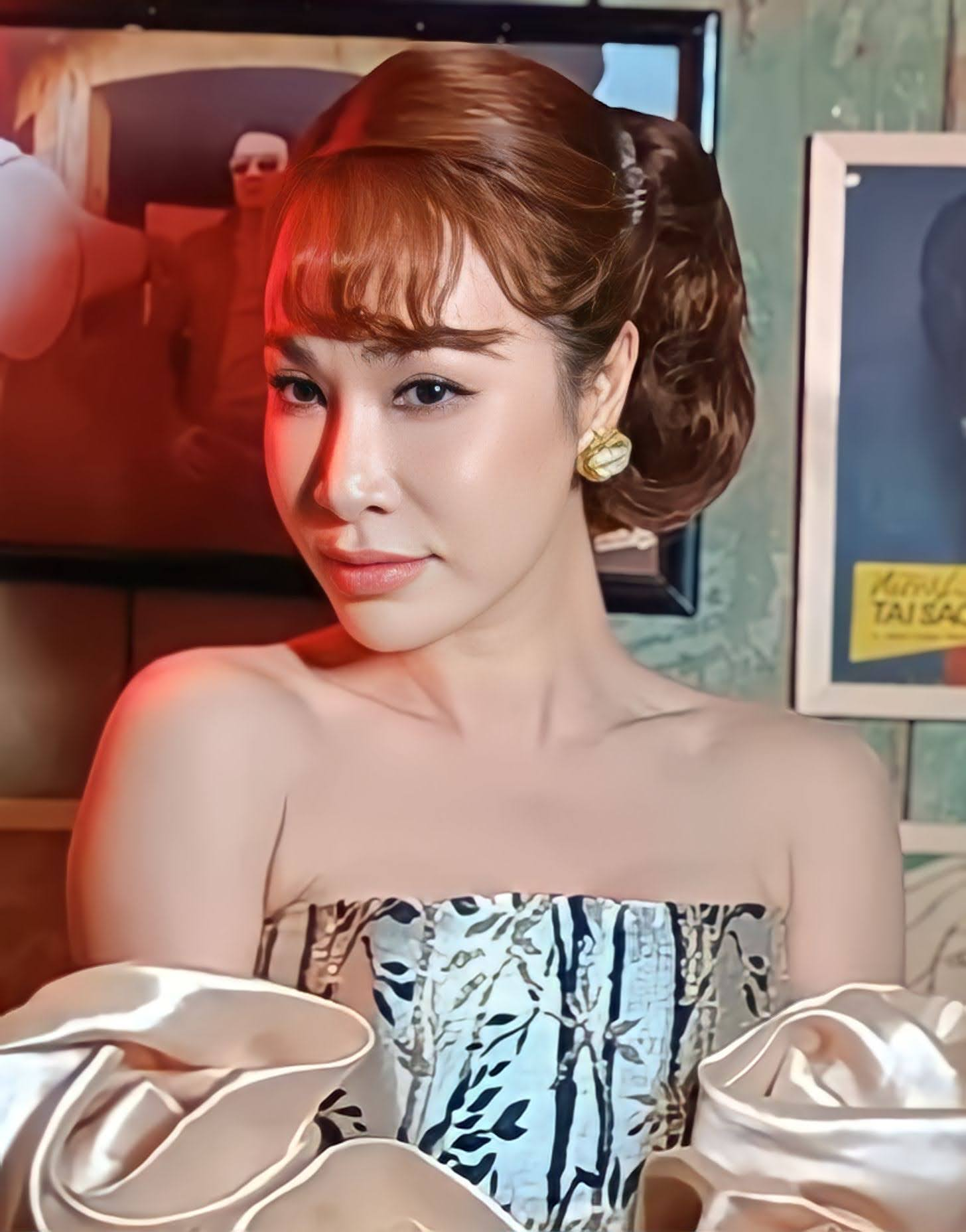

Background information
- Born: Trần Nguyễn Uyên Linh; December 31, 1987 (age 38)
- Origin: Ho Chi Minh City, Vietnam
- Occupation: Singer
- Years active: 2008–
- Label: BHD Entertainment

Trần Nguyễn Uyên Linh (born December 31, 1987) is a Vietnamese pop singer who won the third season of Vietnam Idol in 2010.

== Background ==
Uyen Linh was born in Ho Chi Minh City and raised in Thủ Đức district, Vietnam. After graduating from Lê Hồng Phong High School for the Gifted, she moved to Hanoi to study International Politics at the Diplomatic Academy of Vietnam. During her study there, she opened a fashion shop near the academy. Due to her busy schedule, the shop was subsequently closed.

== Career ==
=== 2008-2010: Vietnam Idol ===
In 2008, she auditioned for the second season of Vietnam Idol and the third series of Sao Mai – Điểm hẹn prior to re-auditioning for Vietnam Idol (season 3), but failed to make it through. She received special prizes from 2008 Soul of Melody, 2008 Let's Get Loud contest. She was a finalist of Northern region in pop genre of Sao Mai 2009 and did not make it to the National. Uyen Linh auditioned for the third season of Vietnam Idol in Hanoi. She advanced to top 10 from the semi-final by the selection of the judges. She was in the bottom three in the fifth gala round and was originally eliminated from the show but later was saved thanks to Đăng Khoa's withdrawal (one of the judges later confirmed that they would have saved her otherwise). From top three, she received positive feedbacks from the judges, audiences, and the mass media with her performances.

Week	Theme	Song choice	Performance order	Result
Audition	Auditioner's Choice	"If I Ain't Got You"	N/A	Advanced
Theater	Solo Performance; Group Performance	"Vẫn Hát Lời Tình Yêu" (Still Singing Love Songs) "Giận anh" (I'm Mad at You)	N/A	Advanced
Semi-final	Random choices	"Với anh" (With You)	6	Advanced to Top 10 by the Judges' choice
Top 10	Freestyles	"Những lời buồn" (Those Sad Words)	10	Safe
Top 9	Pop/Rock	"Mùa đông sẽ qua" (Winter will end)	5	Safe
Top 8	R&B/Hip-hop/Dance	"Lời của ánh mắt" (Message of the eyes)	8	Safe
Top 7	International music	"Fallin'"	2	Safe
Top 6	Unforgettable songs	"Khát vọng" (Aspiration)	4	Bottom 3
Top 5	Diva songs	"Trở lại tuổi thơ" (Back to the Childhood)	1	Eliminated (Saved thanks to Dang Khoa's withdrawal from the contest) ^{1}
Top 4	Duets	"Anh mãi là" (You'll always be) with Mai Hương "Em và tôi" (You and I) with Lân Nhã	1; 4	Safe
Top 3	Judges' choice	"Chỉ là giấc mơ" (Just a Dream) "Đường cong" (The Curve)	1; 4	Safe
Top 2	Contestant's choice International music Winning song	"Sao chẳng về với em" (Why Don't You Come Back to Me) "Take Me to the River" "Cảm ơn tình yêu" (Grateful for the Love)	2; 4; 6	Winner

- ^1 Đăng Khoa withdrew from the contest; therefore, Uyên Linh was saved from elimination.

=== 2010-2011: Post-Idol ===
Uyen Linh appeared on "2010 Moments" year-end talk show on K+, a cable channel of Vietnam Television and talked about her life after Vietnam Idol. She later was chosen as a Person of the Year 2010 by VTV. Early 2011, she released her debut single "Cảm Ơn Tình Yêu", her winning song from Vietnam Idol and received positive reception.

After her victory, she was invited to several music shows and events. It was rumored that she required about 40 million dong ($2000 then) for 2–3 songs each place she performs. Uyên Linh neither denied nor confirmed this rumor and commented that "I lack experience in dealing with show hosters".

=== 2012-2014: Debut and sophomore album ===
Uyen Linh's debut album was originally set to be released in May, however, the album release was pushed back to late June. As of October 1, 2011, the release date of her debut album is yet to be confirmed. On October 22, 2011, Linh's debut music video for the song Giấc mơ tôi had its premiere on MTV Vietnam. Linh's promotional single Người hát tình ca was awarded January's "Song of the Month" in a program called Favorite Song organized by VTV despite the fact that the studio version of the single was not released until the release of the album. Her debut album Giấc mơ tôi was open for pre-order two days before the official release, all copies in the first phase was sold out in one day. Her album was officially released on February 9, 2012.

=== 2017-: Portrait and Chị Đẹp Đạp gió Rẽ Sóng ===
In 2023, Uyen Linh participated in the VTV3's first season of reality singing show Chị Đẹp Đạp Gió Rẽ Sóng (an adaption from the Chinese original show Sisters Who Make Waves). Her solo cover of Hồ Quỳnh Hương's "Anh" (You/My Dearest) received positive reception during the show, praised for "her beautiful voice, imbued with deep emotions that touched hearts."

== Discography ==
=== Singles ===
Year	Single	Album
2010	"Cảm ơn tình yêu" (Thank You, Love)	Vietnam Idol 2010
2011	"Người hát tình ca" (One Who Sings Love Songs)	Giấc mơ tôi (My Dream)
2012	"Giấc mơ tôi" (My Dream)	Giấc mơ tôi (My Dream)
2012	"Mượn"	Giấc mơ tôi (My Dream)
2013	"Nơi cuối chân trời" (Where the Horizon Ends)	
2013	"Chờ người nơi ấy" (Waiting For You Over There)	Mỹ Nhân Kế

=== Albums ===
==== Studio albums ====
Title	Release date
Giấc mơ tôi	February 9, 2012

==== Compilation albums ====
Title	Release date
Vietnam Idol 2010	January 2, 2011

=== Music video ===
- Giấc mơ tôi (2011)
- Mượn (2012)
- Nơi ấy có cha (2013)
- Chờ người nơi ấy (2013)

=== Unreleased songs ===
- If I Ain't Got You (Performed in Vietnam Idol audition)
- Fallin' (Performed on Vietnam Idol)
- Tell Him
- Gió (Performed on Vietnam Idol)
- Chìm Trong Muôn Thuở
- Trả Nợ Tình Xa

== Reality TV show ==
- Chị đẹp đạp gió rẽ sóng 2023 - Contestant
