= Minh Thùy =

Vietnamese singer

- Born: Trần Thị Thùy; 23 December 1987 (age 38)
- Genres: Pop, trữ tình, R&B
- Occupation: Singer
- Instrument: Vocal

Minh Thùy born Trần Thị Thùy (born 23 December 1987), also known to her fans as Búp Bê Quái Vật (Monster Doll) is a Vietnamese singer who won runner-up in Vietnam Idol 2013 on 11 May 2014.

== Music career ==
In 2014, she won runners-up on Vietnam Idol.

On 30 May 2014, she was honored to receive the decision rewards from Quang Tri province because of outstanding achievements in past contests.
