= Quốc Thiên =

Vietnamese singer (born 1988)

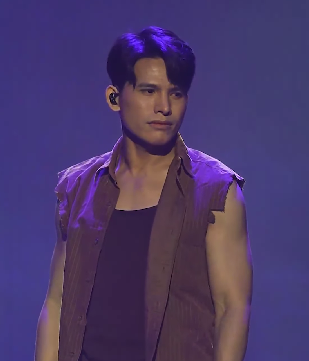
- Quốc Thiên in 2024

Background information
- Born: Trần Quốc Thiên; 9 April 1988 (age 38); Dong Nai, Vietnam
- Origin: Hanoi, Vietnam
- Occupation: Singer
- Years active: 2007–present
- Label: Music Face

Trần Quốc Thiên (born 9 April 1988) is a Vietnamese singer who won the second season of Vietnam Idol in 2008–2009. On 2024, he takes part in the reality show Call Me By Fire.

== Vietnam Idol ==
Quốc Thiên auditioned for Vietnam Idol in Ho Chi Minh City. He proceeded into top 10 and won the title over Thanh Duy on 14 January 2009 with 61 percent of the votes. Upon winning the competition, he was awarded $10,000 and signed a recording contract with recording company Music Face.

=== Vietnam Idol performances ===
1. "Lời Yêu Xa" – An Hiếu – Studio Round 1
2. "Về Ăn Cơm" – Sa Huỳnh – Studio Round 3
3. "Cánh buồm phiêu du" – Sơn Thạch – Top 10
4. "Ngôi sao nhỏ" – Tường Văn – Top 9
5. "Dư âm" – Nguyễn Văn Tý – Top 8
6. "Son" – Đức Nghĩa – Top 7
7. "Rock Sài Gòn" – Lâm Quốc Cường – Top 6
8. "Nửa vầng trăng" – Nhật Trung – Top 5
9. "Tình yêu lung linh" – Hoài An – Top 5
10. "Bài thánh ca buồn" – Nguyễn Vũ – Top 4
11. "Ước mơ cho ngày mai" – Anh Tuấn – Top 4
12. "Mẹ tôi" – Nhị Hà – Top 3
13. "Guitar cho ta" – Lê Minh Sơn – Top 3
14. "Điệp khúc mùa xuân" – Quốc Dũng – Top 3
15. "Yêu Đời" with Thanh Duy – Nguyễn Dân – Top 2
16. "Dấu tình sầu" – Ngô Thuỵ Miên – Top 2
17. "Không còn mùa thu" – Quốc Bảo – Top 2
18. "Em sẽ là giấc mơ" – Lưu Thiên Hương – Top 2
19. "Vẫn hoài ước mơ" with Top 10 Idols – Đức Vượng – Grand Finale
20. "Điệp khúc mùa xuân" with Thanh Duy – Quốc Dũng – Grand Finale
21. "Áo xanh" with Lê Tuấn, Phi Trường and Thanh Duy – Tuấn Khanh – Grand Finale
22. "Son" – Đức Nghĩa – Grand Finale
23. "Một mình" with Quang Dũng – Thanh Tùng – Grand Finale
24. "Nụ cười và những ước mơ" – Đức Trí – Grand Finale

== Music products ==
=== Studio albums ===
- Hát cùng tôi (2009) (Vol 1)
- Vì ta quá yêu (2010) (Vol 2)
- Khi anh lặng im (2013) (Vol 3)

=== Film music ===
- Chào buổi sáng em yêu (composed by Đỗ Thụy Khanh) in the film Chào buổi sáng em yêu
- Tựa cánh hoa bay (composed by Đỗ Thụy Khanh) in the film Vòng vây hoa hồng
- Có đau cũng là xứng đáng (composed by Nguyễn Minh Cường) - OST of Cái giá của hạnh phúc

=== Music videos ===
Music videos of Quốc Thiên
Release date	Song title	Composer
18/07/2013	Lạc	Phạm Toàn Thắng
08/11/2016	Gió Cuốn Em Đi	Sơn Tùng M-TP
08/11/2016	Mong Manh Tình Về	Music: Đức Trí, Lyrics: Phương Nga
10/11/2016	Chia Cách Bình Yên	Tiên Cookie
13/11/2016	Lỡ Mai Này	Tiên Tiên
21/12/2016	Đông Dịu Ngọt	Đức Trí, Phương Nga
08/02/2017	Câu chuyện làm quen	Tiên Cookie
26/08/2017	Nhớ Về Em	Jimmy Nguyễn
13/11/2017	Thương	Khắc Việt
14/09/2018	Phải Là Anh Thì Em Mới Biết Được	Liêu Hưng
10/09/2019	Vạn Sự Tuỳ Duyên	Thanh Hưng
13/02/2020	Cảm Ơn Mình Đã Yêu Anh	Tăng Nhật Tuệ
14/04/2022	Hẹn Nhau Trong Giấc Mơ	Vo Hoai Phuc
01/11/2023	Hơn 1000 Năm Sau	Trịnh Đình Quang
14/10/2024	Thiếu Em Như Trái Đất Thiếu Mặt Trời	Lê Cương, Như Việt
upcoming	SKYNote	Rhymastic
upcoming	Hãy để anh đi	Lê Cương

== Awards ==
1. First Prize of the Hoa Phuong Do Solo Singing Contest summer 2003
2. First Prize of Young Voices 2004, Thong Nhat District, Dong Nai
3. Champion of season 2 program Vietnam Idol in 2008.
4. On March 5, 2025, SKYNote - Quoc Thien won the award "Program of the Year" voted by the audience and a panel of journalists at the Dedication Music Awards - an annual award for the fields of music and sports in Vietnam organized by the newspaper Sports & Culture.
