= Mỹ Linh =

Vietnamese singer

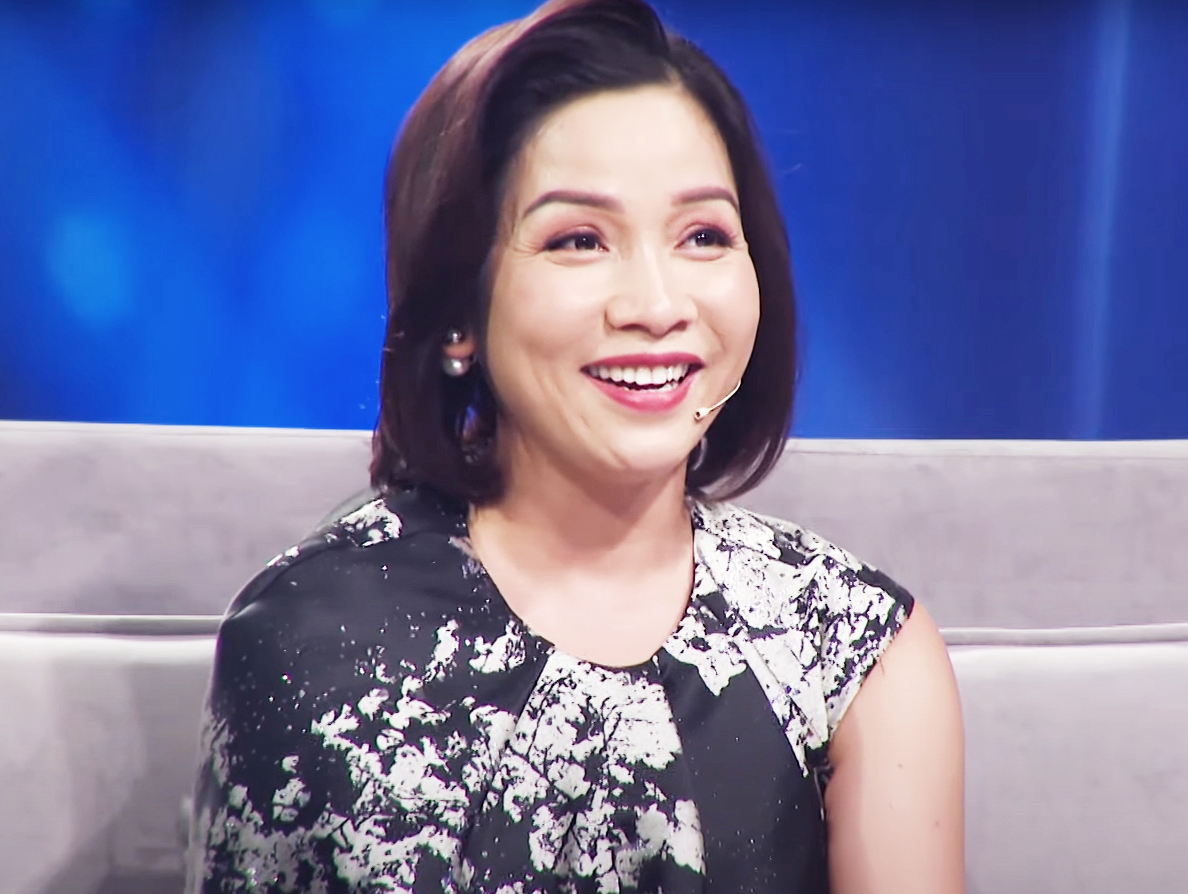
- Mỹ Linh in 2020

Background information
- Born: Đỗ Mỹ Linh; 19 August 1975 (age 51)
- Origin: Hanoi, Vietnam
- Genres: V-pop, pop, soul, funk, semi-classical, R&B
- Occupations: Singer; lyricist; vocal coach
- Years active: 1993–present
- Label: AE Records
- Website: www.mylinh.me

Vietnamese name
- Vietnamese: Mỹ Linh
- Literal meaning: Beautiful soul

Mỹ Linh (born Đỗ Mỹ Linh; 19 August 1975) is a Vietnamese singer, lyricist, and vocal coach. Dubbed the "Queen of Vietnamese R&B", she is one of the best-selling V-pop artists of all time, with more than 2 million records sold. Considered the national diva, she has also been dubbed the "Queen of Spring" for her Tet holiday music, particularly her first single Thì Thầm Mùa Xuân (1993) and "Khúc Giao Mùa'' (2000). Her album Tóc ngắn (1998) created the cultural phenomenon "Mỹ Linh Hair".

Tóc ngắn and her latter album Chat với Mozart (2005) respectively hold the titles of best-selling R&B album and crossover album of all time in Vietnam. Her 2003 critical and commercial success album Made in Vietnam topped the Japanese album monthly chart in 2007. It was the first Vietnamese album to be officially distributed in international markets, featuring English and Spanish versions.

== Early life and education ==
My Linh was born in a working-class family in Hanoi on 19 August 1975. Her father was a literature school-teacher, then worker and building constructor. Her mother was a worker in a pharmaceutical factory. She has an older brother and a younger sister.

My Linh won awards at various local children music contests. She attended Elementary and Middle School in Hai Bà Trưng District, Hanoi. In 1994, she graduated from Bạch Mai High School and came first in the entrance exam to the Hanoi Conservatory of Music. She graduated in 1997, having become a pop singer.

== Music career ==
In August 1993, My Linh and the Hoa Sữa band won second place at the National Pop Music Festival. Mỹ Linh herself won the Best New Artist award with the song Thì Thầm Mùa Xuân written by Ngọc Châu. My Linh started her professional music career after the Festival.

In 1998, My Linh married composer and producer Anh Quân. She began to perform soul and funk music. She went on a Vietnam tour Tiếng Hát Mỹ Linh in 1998, performing in Hanoi, Da Nang and Ho Chi Minh City. Following the success of the tour, in 1999, she released Tóc Ngắn album.

In 2003, My Linh signed a contract with the American record company, Blue Tiger, to release an English-language album. Coming to America was released in 2004.

In 2006, My Linh was one of the judges for Sao Mai Điểm Hẹn, a singing contest hosted by Vietnam Television to discover young music talents.

My Linh has performed in China, Thailand, Korea, Russia, Germany, Czech Republic, Ukraine, Switzerland, United Kingdom, Cuba, United States, Canada and Australia. In 2006, she is the only Vietnamese artist performing in Asian Divas night in Nagoya, Japan.

In 2023, My Linh participated in the reality TV show Chị đẹp đạp gió rẽ sóng, the Vietnamese version developed from the Chinese format Sisters Who Make Waves.

At the end of the 2023 season, My Linh was one of seven artists named to form the "Đạp Gió" group, along with Trang Pháp, Ninh Dương Lan Ngọc, MLee, Thu Phương, Lệ Quyên, and Diệp Lam Anh. At the final night, she also received the "Most Beautiful Woman of the Year" award.

In 2024, My Linh returned to the show in Chị đẹp đạp gió 2024. According to the producers, she and Thu Phuong are two artists from the first season returning for the second season.

In the early stages of the 2024 season, My Linh and Thu Phuong were introduced as two direct rivals, participating in the head-to-head structure of the show. The program's opening episode aired on October 26, 2024.

== Activism ==
In 2004, My Linh recorded a public service announcement about the threats that people's consumption of bear bile posed to wild bear populations and to the welfare of bears that are farmed for their bile. The short film, which was broadcast on several Vietnamese TV stations, and included footage shot at bear farms in Hanoi. The film was produced by Education for Nature Vietnam, the country's first non-governmental organization to focus on conservation, with assistance from the London-based Environmental Justice Foundation.

== Discography ==
=== Studio albums ===
- 10 Tình Khúc Bảo Phúc – Anh Thoa (1995)
- Vẫn Hát Lời Tình Yêu (1996)
- Xin Mặt Trời Ngủ Yên (1996)
- Cho Một Người Tình Xa (1996)
- Mỹ Linh (1997)
- Mùa Thu Không Trở Lại (1998)
- Chiều Xuân (1998)
- Còn Mãi Tìm Nhau (1999)
- Tóc Ngắn (1998)
- Tóc Ngắn Vol. 2: Vẫn Mãi Mong Chờ (2000)
- Made in Vietnam (2003)
- Chat Với Mozart (2005)
- Để Tình Yêu Hát (2006)
- Tóc Ngắn Acoustic: Một Ngày (2011)
- Chat Với Mozart Vol. II (2018)

=== Video albums ===
- Mỹ Linh (1998)
- Tóc Ngắn (2000)
- Mỹ Linh Tour '06 (2007)
- Cảm Xúc Mùa Thu (2012)

=== Shows ===
- WeChoice (27/1/2024)
- Chị Đẹp Đạp Gió Rẽ Sóng (28/10/2023)
- Chị Đẹp Đạp Gió 2024 (26/10/2024)
