= North (band) =

Australian boy band

- Origin: Melbourne, Victoria, Australia
- Years active: 2004–2006
- Labels: Universal; EMI
- Past members: Alfred "Alf" Tuohey; Beau McCleish; Scott Folley; Thanh Bùi; Joel Velasco

North were an Australian boy band established in 2004. Popular primarily in Asia, the group had top ten singles in Thailand, Indonesia, Malaysia, the Philippines, and India. Their debut single was a cover of Peter Cetera's "Glory of Love" which reached No. 1 in both Indonesia and Thailand.

== Members ==
The band's initial line-up consisted of Alfred Tuohey, Beau McCleish, Scott Folley and Thanh Bùi.

Scott Folley chose to leave the band after the release of their first album and promotional tour, and was replaced by Joel Velasco, who first appeared on North's single "Cos I Love You".

The group disbanded in 2006.

== Post break-up ==
Thanh Bùi became a contestant on the 6th season of Australian Idol and was eliminated during the Top 8 Results Night. He was one of four judges on The Voice of Vietnam Kids.

Alfred Tuohey became a producer and artist manager for Mozart & Friends Studio.

== Discography ==
=== Albums ===
- 2004: North (on Universal)
- 2006: Straight Up (on EMI)

=== Singles ===
(Selective)

- 2004: "Glory of Love"
- 2004: "I Won't Hold Back"
- 2006: " 'Cos I Love You"
- 2006: "I Am Strong"
