= Siu Black =

Vietnamese singer (born 1967)

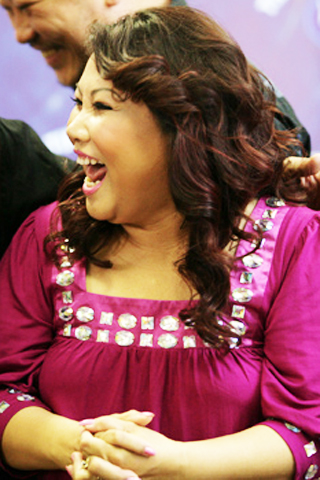
- Black as a judge on Vietnam Idol in 2008

Background information
- Born: August 27, 1967 (age 57); Plei Tơnghia, Kon Tum, Kon Tum Province, South Vietnam
- Occupations: Singer
- Instruments: Vocals
- Years active: 1999–2013

Siu Black (born in Pleitonghia Commune, near the city of Kon Tum in Kon Tum Province, South Vietnam, August 27, 1967) is a Vietnamese singer from the Central Highlands. She is a member of the Ba Na (Bahnar) ethnic group.

== Early life ==
She graduated from Dac Lac Arts School and joined the Dac Lac Arts Troupe in 1989. She then worked at the Kon Tum Electricity Company from 1993 before finding success as a singer.

== Career ==
She has been mentored by the singer Y Moan and has recorded several of the songs of Nguyễn Cường, and her renditions have achieved great popularity.

In 2007, she served as a judge on the Vietnam Idol television program. and the first Asian Idol competition, held in Indonesia in December 2007, representing Vietnam Idol. Starting in September 2007, she will host a comedy variety show called 0 Degrees Diary (Vietnamese: Nhật ký 0 độ) on HTV9.

== Personal life ==
In 1993, Siu Black married with a former Đắk Lắk football player, Nguyễn Đức Hùng. Their marriage ended in 2004 but before that they had 2 sons, Nguyễn Siu Mạnh and Nguyễn Siu Hiếu.

In April 2019, Siu Black appeared on the talk show Ký ức vui vẻ. Many viewers were surprised when she appeared on stage with a much smaller physique than before. She had to go on a diet to cure illnesses. Siu Black revealed that she had vestibular disorders, high blood pressure, and severe diabetes. She had to go on a diet for fear of the complications of diabetes. There was a time where she only slept for 30 minutes a night. The bad health also affected more or less her voice. The voice of 'Ban Me coffee cup' said that now she has to close her eyelids to turn her voice out.

Siu Black lives in Kon Tum with her two sons and a sister. Her main job is singing at church. She once confided in the media: "Singing in a church is like living in the love of God. My soul relaxed, softer. Without that belief, I would not have survived until now". In addition, Siu Black is also actively involved in charitable activities, accepting invitations to perform at small stages. Although no longer interested in showbiz, Siu Black's voice is still very powerful and is still a way to help her relieve and forget about her illnesses even if the performance is not the same as before.

Siu Black said that her life currently is hard and very simple. One day, her whole family spent no more than VND50,000, but she always gets affection from friends and fans.
