= Phương Vy =

Vietnamese singer (born 1987)

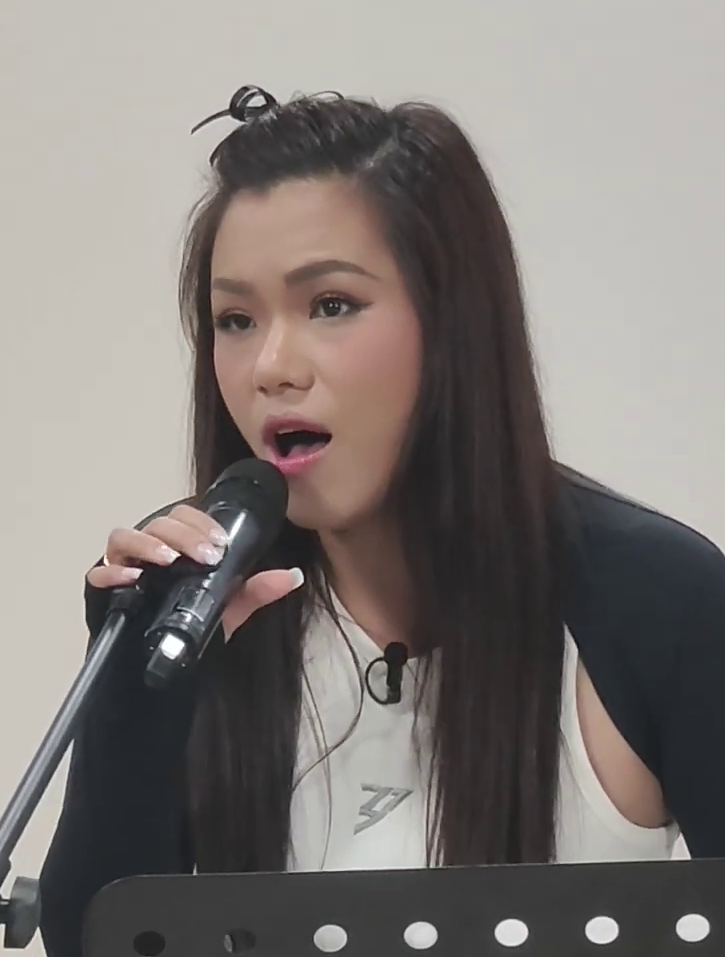
- Vy in 2023

Background information
- Born: Nguyễn Ngọc Phương Vy; August 27, 1987 (age 39)
- Origin: Ho Chi Minh City, Vietnam
- Occupation: Singer
- Years active: 2007–

Nguyễn Ngọc Phương Vy (born August 27, 1987) is a Vietnamese singer. Vy auditioned for Vietnam Idol in Ho Chi Minh City. She proceeded into the top 10 and was never voted into the bottom three. Vy advanced into the final and won the title over Ngọc Ánh on October 3, 2007 with 53.44% of the votes.
