= Zhoumin =

Zhoumin or Zhou Min may refer to:

== given name: Zhoumin ==
- Zheng Zhoumin (Chinese: 鄭周敏; 1927–2002), Chinese-Filipino businessman

== given name: Zhou, surname: Min ==
- Min Zhou (Chinese: 周敏, romanized: Zhōu Mǐn; born 1956), Chinese sociologist

== given name: Min, surname: Zhou ==
- Zhou Min (western name order: Min Zhou; born 1997), Chinese swimmer

== See also ==
- Zhou Ming (born 1970), Chinese longjumper
- Mingzhou (disambiguation)
- Minzhou (disambiguation)
- All pages with titles containing "Zhou" and "Min"
- Zhou (disambiguation)
- Min (disambiguation)
