= Minh =

Disambiguation page

Minh (Chữ Nôm: 明) is a given name of Vietnamese origin. The name is derived from the Sino-Vietnamese reading of the Chinese character 明. Meaning "bright," "clear," or "intelligent." In Vietnamese naming traditions, Minh is associated with clarity, wisdom, and enlightenment for men. The name has historical usage in Vietnam, including in imperial and scholarly contexts, where it was often used to convey intellectual ability and moral clarity.

As a unisex name, Minh can be a given name for both boys and girls, though it appears more frequently and commonly in males. It is also popular among other East Asian names. The Chinese name Ming has similar meaning.

== Notable people ==
=== As a feminine name ===
- Lê Ngọc Minh Hằng (born 1987), Vietnamese actor and singer
- Vũ Thu Minh (born 1977), Vietnamese pop singer

=== As a masculine name ===
- Đặng Nhật Minh (born 1938), Vietnamese filmmaker
- Dương Văn Minh (1916–2001), Vietnamese politician and military figure
- Ho Chi Minh (ne Nguyễn Sinh Cung; 1890–1969), president of the Democratic Republic of Vietnam from 1945–1969
- Lê Lương Minh (born 1962), Vietnamese politician and diplomat
- Minh Lê (born 1977), Vietnamese-Canadian video game creator
- Quyền Văn Minh (born 1954), Vietnamese saxophonist
- Minh Alva Vu (born 1990), Vietnamese-American soccer player
- Minh Mạng (born 1791), second emperor of the Nguyễn dynasty of Vietnam
