= Minzhou =

Minzhou or Min Zhou may refer to:

== Places ==
- Mínzhōu (Chinese: 岷州, lit. 'Min State'), Dingxi, Gansu, China

== People ==
- Wei Minzhou (Chinese: 魏民洲, romanized: Wèi Mínzhōu; born 1956), Chinese politician
- Min Zhou (Chinese: 周敏, romanized: Zhōu Mǐn; born 1956), Chinese sociologist
- Zhou Min (western name order: Min Zhou; born 1997), Chinese swimmer

== See also ==
- Zhou Ming (western name order: Ming Zhou; born 1970), Chinese longjumper
- Zhoumin (disambiguation)
- Mingzhou (disambiguation)
- Zhou (disambiguation)
- Min (disambiguation)
