= Ming (disambiguation) =

The Ming dynasty was an imperial dynasty of China that existed from 1368 to 1644.

Ming may also refer to:

== People ==
- Emperor Ming, multiple persons
- Ming (surname) (明), a Chinese surname
- Ming (given name), a Chinese given name
- Ming (DJ), American DJ
- Ming Campbell, Scottish politician and athlete, leader of the Liberal Democrats
- Luke 'Ming' Flanagan, Irish politician, member of the European Parliament
- Norman 'Ming' Walsh, Rhodesian and Zimbabwean air marshal

== Other uses ==
- Ming (album), 1980 jazz album by David Murray
- Ming (clam), an individual clam, claimed to be the oldest living animal ever discovered
- Ming (The Amazing Digital Circus), a character from the animated series The Amazing Digital Circus
- Ming class submarine, a class of diesel-electric submarines built by China
- Ming of Harlem, a tiger who lived in a New York apartment
- Immingham, England, a Lincolnshire town often known as "Ming" or "Ming-Ming"
- Ming library, a C library with dynamic language bindings for creating Adobe Flash (.swf) files
- Motorola MING, a smartphone released by Motorola
- Ming Prefecture (disambiguation) (Mingzhou), historical prefectures of imperial China
- Ming River in Hebei, China
- Southern Ming, a series of loyalist regimes established following the collapse of the Ming dynasty
- Ming (typefaces), a common category of typefaces for printing Chinese characters
- Ming Cult, fictional organization

== See also ==
- Menzies, a Scottish name sometimes shortened to "Ming"
