= Li Ming =

Li Ming may refer to:

- Lee Meng (Chinese: 李明; pinyin: Lǐ Míng; 1926–2012), Chinese Communist guerrilla leader in Malaya
- Leon Lai (Chinese: 黎明; pinyin: Lí Míng; born 1966), Hong Kong singer and actor
- Li Ming (banker) (Chinese: 李銘; pinyin: Lǐ Míng; 1887-1966), Chinese banker
- Li Ming (footballer, born 1971) (Chinese: 李明; pinyin: Lǐ Míng), Chinese football player
- Li Ming (footballer, born 1975) (Chinese: 李明; pinyin: Lǐ Míng), Chinese football player and coach
- Li Ming (footballer, born 2000) (Chinese: 李明; pinyin: Lǐ Míng), Chinese football player
- Li Ming (diplomat) (Chinese: 李明; pinyin: Lǐ Míng), Chinese ambassador to Serbia
- Ming Li, Canadian computer scientist

== See also ==
- Liming (disambiguation)
