= Ming Prefecture =

Ming Prefecture or Mingzhou (Ming-zhou, Ming Zhou) may refer to:

- Ming Prefecture (Hebei) (洺州), a prefecture between the 6th and 13th centuries
- Mingzhou (Hebei town), the seat of the Hebei prefecture, now Guangfu Ancient City in Handan Prefecture, Hebei
- Ming Prefecture (Zhejiang) (明州), a prefecture between the 8th and 12th centuries
- Mingzhou (Zhejiang town), the seat of the Zhejiang prefecture, now Ningbo, Zhejiang

== See also ==
- Zhou Ming (western name order: Ming Zhou; born 1970), Chinese longjumper
- Zhou Ming (linguist) (western name order: Ming Zhou), Chinese computer scientist and businessman
- Minzhou (disambiguation)
- Ming (disambiguation)
- Zhou (disambiguation)
- All pages with titles containing "Ming" and "Zhou"
