= Minghua =

Minghua or Ming Hua may refer to:

== Places ==
- Minghua Subdistrict (明桦街道), in Huadian, Jilin
- Mínghua District, in Sunan Yugur Autonomous County
  - Mínghai Township, in the eponymous district in Sunan Yugur Autonomous County
- Minghua, Nangong (明化镇), a town in Nangong
- Minghua Village, in Dalin, Chiayi

== Other ==
- Ming Hua Theological College in Hong Kong
- Minghua (ship) (明华), a hotel ship in Shekou, Shenzhen, China (the former MS Ancerville)
- Chi Minghua (池明华, born 1962), Chinese soccer coach

== See also ==
- Ming (disambiguation)
- Hua (disambiguation)
