= Trúc Nhân =

Vietnamese singer

Nguyễn Trúc Nhân
- Trúc Nhân in 2026

Background information
- Also known as: Trúc Nhân, Nhân
- Born: 30 November 1991 (age 34); Hoài Nhơn, Bình Định province, Vietnam
- Genres: V-pop, Pop, Ballad
- Occupation: Singer
- Years active: 2012–present
- Website: Trúc Nhân on YouTube

Nguyễn Trúc Nhân (born 30 November 1991), also simply known as Trúc Nhân, is a Vietnamese singer. He was known for participating in The Voice of Vietnam. Trúc Nhân has had 5 nominations and won 3 times for the Dedication Music Award.

== Private life and career ==
Trúc Nhân was born in Hoài Nhơn, Bình Định province and raised in Vũng Tàu due to family business. After graduating from Trần Nguyên Hãn High School, he moved to Ho Chi Minh City, majored in graphic design at Văn Lang University and pursued singing as a casual job. In 2012, Trúc Nhân soon became the contestant of the first season of The Voice of Vietnam, under coach Thu Minh and ended up in Top 8.

=== 2013: Debut with mini album Đông ===
After The Voice of Vietnam, Trúc Nhân released his first mini album "Đông" (lit. Winter or East), including his popular covers from The Voice of Vietnam, such as; "Gió Mùa Về" (originally by Lê Minh Sơn), Đông (originally by Vũ Cát Tường) and Mercy (originally by Duffy). Whilst producing his album, he was support from his ex-coach, singer Thu Minh, as well as music producer Nguyễn Hải Phong, and other musicians.

"At first, the album would be called "N". The title "N" implies two things; the first letter of my name – Nhân, and my expression of my desire to succeed "n" times on the path I chose. However, due to some problems with depicting N-shaped haircuts whilst shooting for the cover album, so it was never carried out, and because I don't want to make poor-quality products to my fans".

– Trúc Nhân (translated)

=== 2014: Rise to fame and Bốn chữ lắm ===
Trúc Nhân collaborated with Văn Mai Hương in the song "Tìm" (Search) and it was released in May 2014. He continued to collaborate with other artists, this time with Trương Thảo Nhi in the song "Bốn Chữ Lắm" (Too Much Love, Affection, Distance, Pain). The unique thing about this song is the entire music video was filmed using a smartphone. The song quickly gained popularity, conquered several music charts and receiving music awards, including Vietnamese Song of the Year 2014

=== 2015: A surprise with Thật bất ngờ ===
In 2015, Trúc Nhân released the song "Muốn khóc thật to" (Want to cry out loud), produced by Tăng Nhật Tuệ, and later released Thật bất ngờ (Surprise), produced by Mew Amazing. The song, "Thật bất ngờ", unveiling the dark side of the Vietnamese entertainment industry, which are the use of scandals and harassment as blackmail. Trúc Nhân said;

"This song was banned in a lot of programs – especially live ones due to sensitive language. It seems that everybody misunderstood it. I mean it is a good theme but there are only a few musicians who are brave enough to write about it, but somehow, I wanted to sing it right away after listening to the demo, I believe the audiences should look at many interesting things of the showbiz rather than through a rose-tinted glass. The audiences would probably love the song due to a catchy melody, one-of-a-kind lyrics and a curiosity-stimulating topic. As for my unnamed colleagues, I think they won't hate the composer or the performer because it is just a glimpse of the dark side of showbiz, not intended to judge the situation like pointing out what's right, what's wrong or who's right, who's wrong. They perhaps will love this song too." – Trúc Nhân

Trúc Nhân wrote the music video's script in satirical style. In the music video, filmed at an old public housing project in Hanoi, he played the role of a newsboy, with the local people discussing and gossiping about the vast world of chaos out there. The song received great support from listeners, and was featured in a karaoke challenge on the thirty-first season of The Amazing Race.

=== 2017: Top ratings with Ngồi hát đỡ buồn ===
On 7 July 2017, Trúc Nhân released "Ngồi hát đỡ buồn" (Sing to overcome the sadness), composed by Nguyễn Hải Phong, as a soundtrack for the film The Girl from Yesterday. The song focuses on a male protagonist who is head over heels in love, but the lyrics sound rather cheerful, not moody. The composition of the song is a mix of Vietnamese folk music and cowboy Western music. Trúc Nhân stole the audiences' heart from the beginning of the song. His mumbling technique suits the style of the song. He also performed more soundtracks for other films, such as "Phượng hồng, Người ta nói" (Flamboyant Pink), another hit.

=== 2018: Comeback with Người ta có thương mình đâu ===
After taking one-year's break Trúc Nhân made his comeback with"Người ta có thương mình đâu" (They don't love you) on 17 July. It is a gentle ballad compose accompanied with somber lyrics, created by 9 lyricists and producers. The song tells the stories of three victims of unrequited love who are unable to confess their feeling to their respective beloved. The scenes in the music video were made to closely match the lyrics. Eventually, happy endings don't show up, leave viewers with pitiful experience. Trúc Nhân makes a brief appearance in the music video acting as the inner voice of each character.

=== 2019: Making an impression with Lớn rồi còn khóc nhè and Sáng mắt chưa? ===
In April 2019,"Lớn rồi còn khóc nhè" (Grown up, still crying like a baby) was released with the main theme of maternal bond. It explores the idea of growing up, taking responsibilities for one's own actions, dealing with worries, and they distract one from looking after one's mother. The song introduced a fresh air to the V-pop music industry.

In August 2019, Trúc Nhân released "Sáng mắt chưa?" (Are you clear?). The song is about difficulties of love in the LGBT community, and with lyrics and cinematography. Both the lyrics and music video are about two boys that are in love, but due to family pressure, one enters into a heterosexual marriage. In the music video, Trúc Nhân plays the ex-lover of the groom, deciding to take revenge by revealing the groom's closeted homosexuality. Throughout the music video, the lyrics sung by Trúc Nhân act as a non-diegetic warning to the bride with a hint of jealously at their marriage. However, the revenge turns out to be the groom's imagination as Trúc Nhân chooses to leave with a blessing. The release was praised for being lighthearted, despite the tragedies of homosexuals in society. The music video was shot in Vietnam and Thailand, inviting the dance group Angel Turbo from Thailand's Got Talent, adding to a humorous and entertaining scene during the bridge of the song that was sung in Thai.

== Discography ==
=== Songs ===
- 2013: Đông
- 2013: Cuộc Sống Muôn Màu
- 2014: Tìm
- 2014: 4 Chữ Lắm
- 2014: Vẽ
- 2015: Thật Bất Ngờ
- 2016: Making Money
- 2016: Nắng Cực
- 2018: Người Ta Có Thương Mình Đâu
- 2019: Lớn Rồi Còn Khóc Nhè
- 2019: Sáng Mắt Chưa
- 2022: Có Không Giữ Mất Đừng Tìm
- 2024: Không Ra Gì
- 2026: Vạn Sự Như Ý
- 2026: Tân Mùi (album) (Song: Không có gì, Đi đêm có ngày gặp em,...)
