= Mings =

Mings is a surname. Notable people with the surname include:

- Christopher Myngs (1625–1666), English naval officer and privateer
- Tyrone Mings (born 1993), English footballer

== See also ==
- Ming (surname)
