= The Voice of Vietnam =

Vietnamese reality television competition

- Vietnamese: Giọng hát Việt
- Genre: Reality television
- Created by: Endemol
- Presented by: Phan Anh; Nguyên Khang; Phí Linh
- Judges: Đàm Vĩnh Hưng; Thu Minh; Trần Lập (†); Hồ Ngọc Hà; Hồng Nhung; Mỹ Linh; Quốc Trung; Mỹ Tâm; Thu Phương; Tuấn Hưng; Tóc Tiên; Đông Nhi; Noo Phước Thịnh; Lam Trường; Hồ Hoài Anh; Tuấn Ngọc; Thanh Hà
- Country of origin: Vietnam
- Original language: Vietnamese
- No. of series: 6
- No. of episodes: 108

Production
- Production location: Ho Chi Minh City
- Running time: 120 min (Blind Audition, Battle Round and Knock out); 120min (Liveshows)
- Production companies: Cát Tiên Sa; Talpa

Original release
- Network: Vietnam Television
- Release: 8 July 2012 – 21 July 2019

Related
- The Voice of Holland; The Voice (American TV series)

The Voice of Vietnam (Vietnamese: Giọng hát Việt) is a reality television singing competition created by Endemol. It premiered in Vietnam in July 2012 on Vietnam Television. The format is Dutch and the original Dutch version of the programme was broadcast in the Netherlands for the first time in 2010 as The Voice of Holland. The programme was commissioned after a successful first season in the United States, where it aired on NBC domestically and AXN Asia regionally. It is produced by Cát Tiên Sa.

== Format ==
Contestants are aspiring singers drawn from public auditions. The show's format features three stages of competition. The first is the blind audition (vòng Giấu Mặt), in which four coaches listen to contenders without seeing them, and turn their chairs to signify that they are interested in working with that contestant. If more than one coach turns the chair, the contestant chooses the coach he or she would like to work with. The blind audition ends when each coach has fourteen (Vietnamese version) contestants to work with. Coaches will dedicate themselves to developing their singers, giving them advice, and sharing the secrets of their success. Since Season 5, the Blocks (chặn) are added. Coaches can block another coaches to prevent them from having an artist. In Season 6, coaches can press the block button even after they turned their chair but they can't block the special coach.

The competition then enters a battle round (Vòng Đối Đầu), when the coaches pick two of their own team members against each other to sing the same song together in front of a studio audience. After the one-on-one battle on stage, the coach must choose which singers will advance to the next round, which can be either the Knockouts or the Live Shows. Another twist is added on Season 2, the Steal. Coaches can steal two losing artists from another team and they will be switching to that team. In Season 4, coaches only have one wildcard save and can't steal.

The Knockout Round was added in season two, adapting from the U.S version. In this round, two contestants from the same team are paired against each other to sing individually in succession. Contestants are not informed who their opponents will be since coaches will decide the pairs directly onstage. At the end of the two performances, only one contestant will be saved by his/her coach to advance to the Live shows.

In the live performance phase of the competition, contestants from each team compete against each other during a live broadcast. The television audience vote to save one contestant from each team, leaving the coach to decide live who they want to save and who will not move on. In the semi-final round, the public directly chooses between the two contestants left on each team based upon an online music video produced and released by the executive producers.

Finally, each coach will have his/her best contestant left standing to compete in the finals, singing an original song. From these four, one will be named "Giọng hát Việt" (literally: "The Voice of Vietnam") - and will receive a cash prize of ₫500 million and a recording contract with Universal Republic Records.

== Coaches and hosts ==
On 14 March 2012, four coaches were chosen, namely Thu Minh, Trần Lập, Hồ Ngọc Hà, and Đàm Vĩnh Hưng. They each guided a team of fourteen. The first season was hosted by Phan Anh, former host of Vietnam Idol, while V.Music band, including four members, and Phương Mai take the role of backstage and social media correspondents respectively. After the finals of the first season, Thu Minh announced her departure from the show for a European residency. Hồ Ngọc Hà and Trần Lập did not return as well due to professional reasons. Three new coaches recruited for season 2 were Mỹ Linh, Hồng Nhung, and Quốc Trung.

On 6 March 2015, Tuấn Hưng confirmed he would become a coach for the show's third season. A week later, Đàm Vĩnh Hưng was announced to be returning to the show for his third season. On 13 April 2015, the coaching panel for Season 3 was officially confirmed as Tuấn Hưng, Đàm Vĩnh Hưng, Thu Phương, and Mỹ Tâm. Phan Anh continued his job as host in Season 2 and Season 3.

Coach Trần Lập died after a long battle with rectal cancer on 17 March 2016.

On 4 January 2017 it was announced that Thu Minh would return to her red chair for the show's fourth cycle after two seasons of absence; while former Vietnam Idol Kids judge Tóc Tiên as well as two coaches from The Voice Kids, Đông Nhi and Noo Phước Thịnh, would be joining the show as coaches. This marks the first time in any franchise of The Voice worldwide to have three female coaches and only one male coach. The fourth season is hosted by Nguyên Khang, former host of The X Factor Vietnam.

Auditioning for the fifth season was held from December 2017 to March 2018. On 6 April 2018, the coaching panel for Season 5 was revealed with coaches Thu Phương, Noo Phước Thịnh, and Tóc Tiên returning, while former The Voice Kids coach Lam Trường filled the last spot. Former Sing My Song presenter Phí Linh replaced Nguyên Khang as host along with Season 4 winner Ali Hoàng Dương who served as the backstage presenter for Season 5, and remained in the following season. On 12 March 2019, it was confirmed that Tuấn Hưng would be returning to his red chair for the series' sixth season. The following day, it was announced that veteran The Voice Kids coach Hồ Hoài Anh and singers Tuấn Ngọc and Thanh Hà have joined the coaching panel for Season 6. However, midway through the season, Tuấn Hưng announced he would not be returning to the show in future seasons.

Coaches gallery

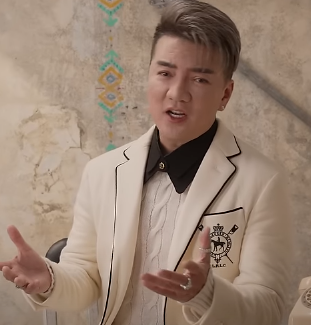
Đàm Vĩnh Hưng (2012–15)

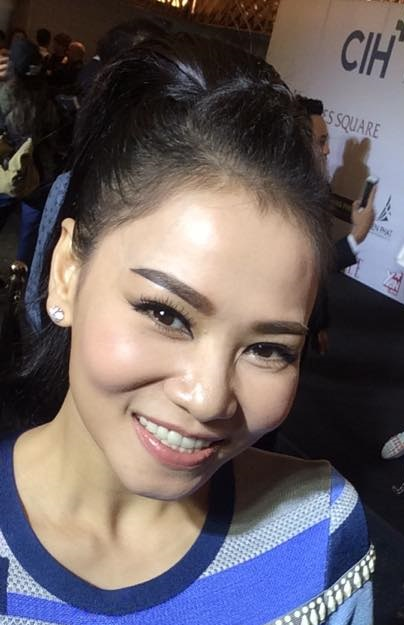
Thu Minh (2012, 2017)

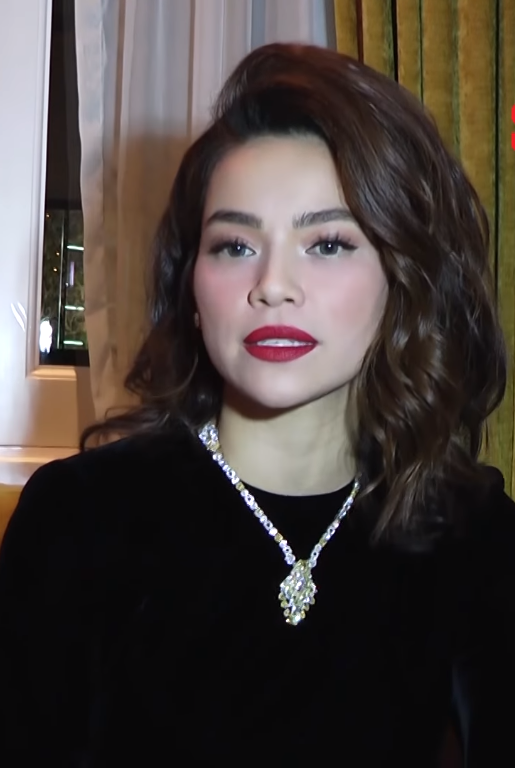
Hồ Ngọc Hà (2012)

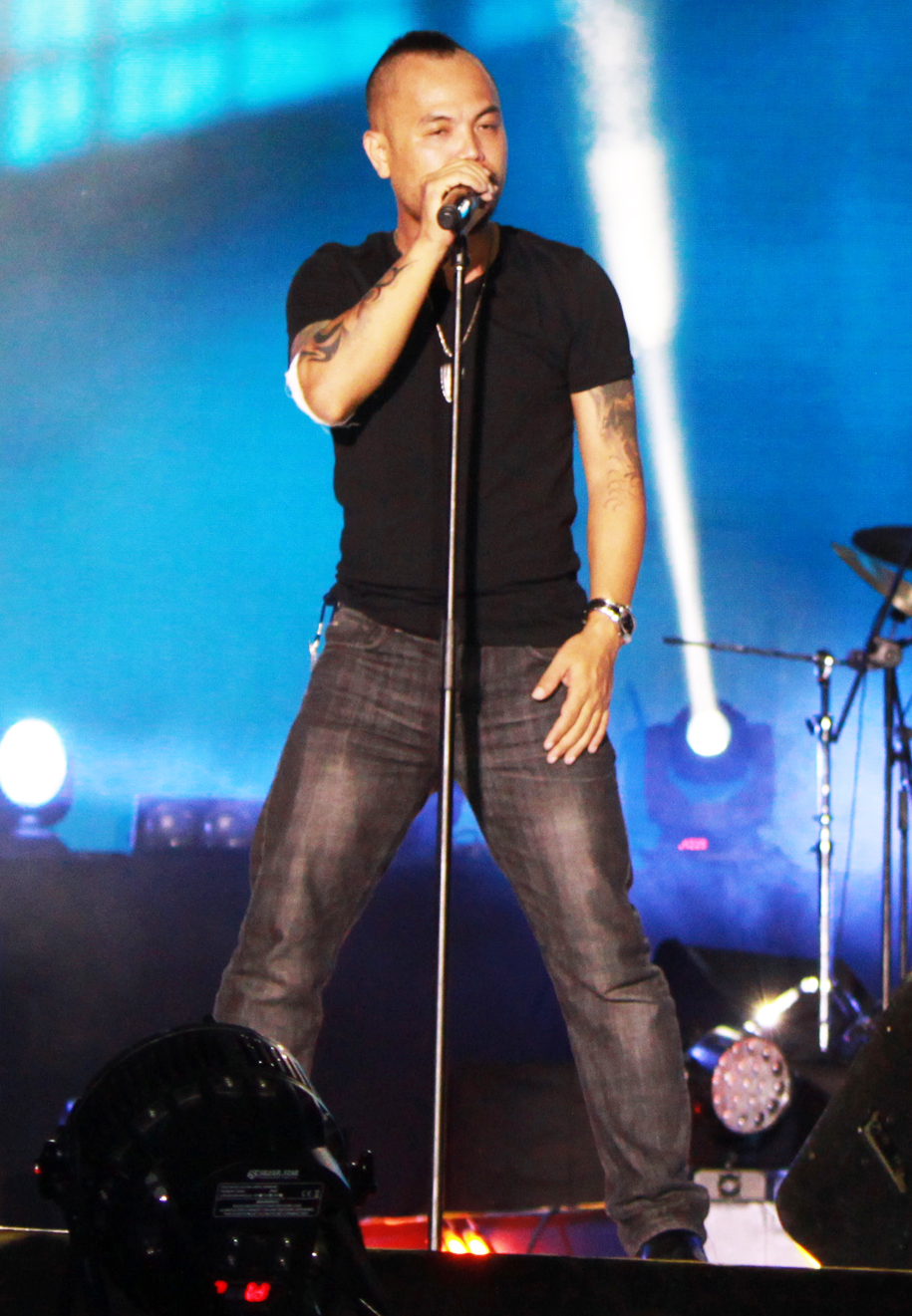
Trần Lập (2012)

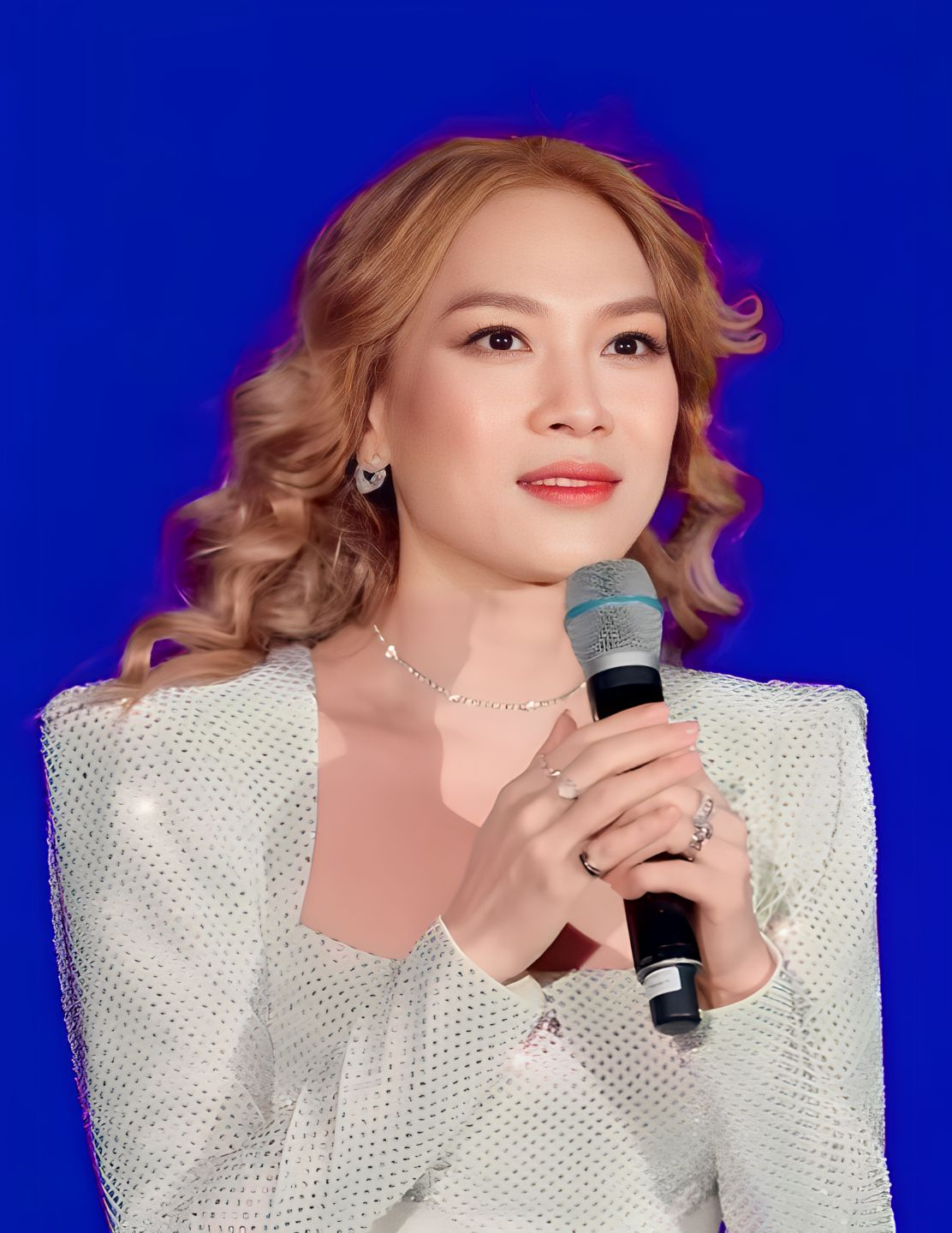
Mỹ Tâm (2015)

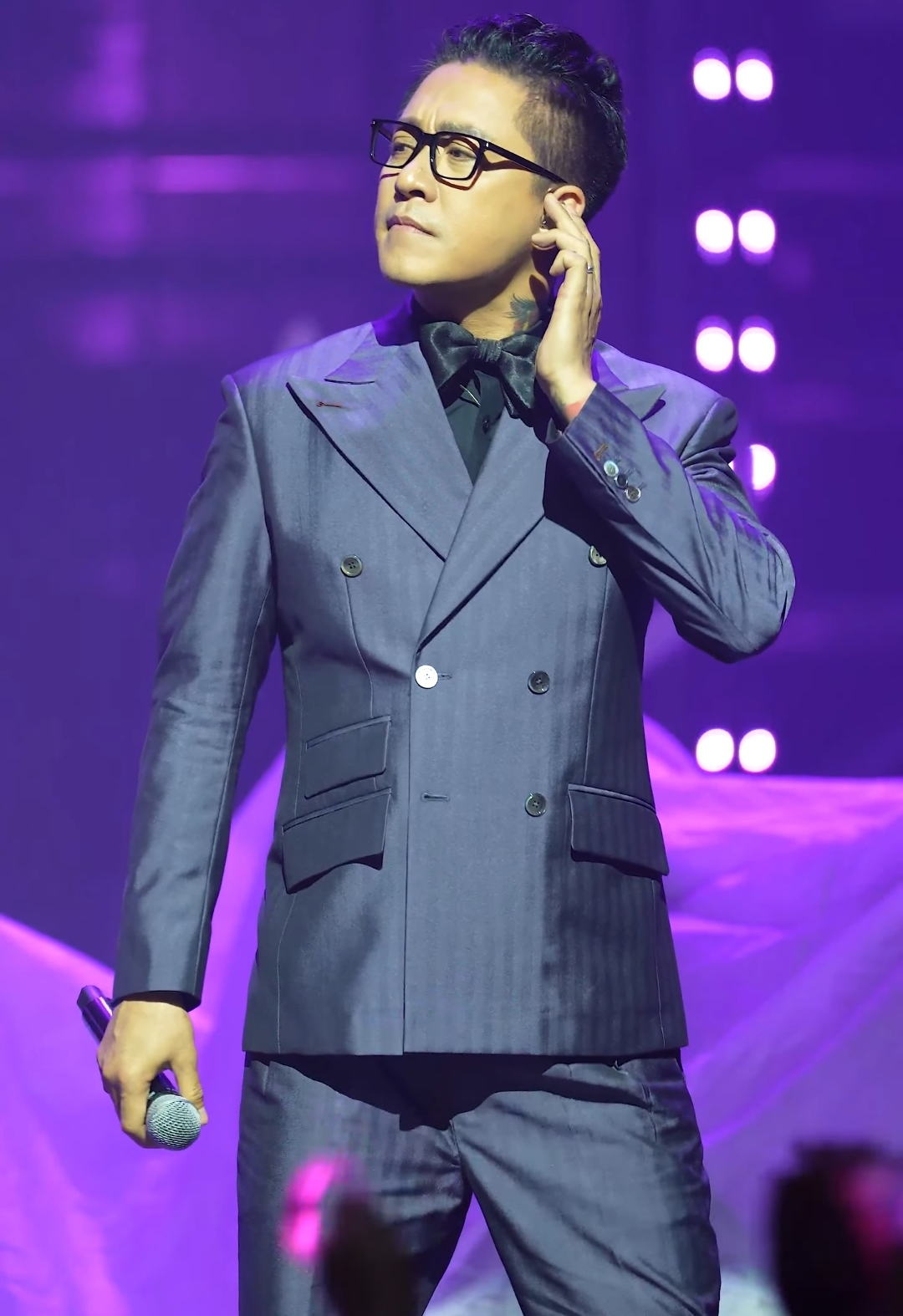
Tuấn Hưng (2015, 2019)

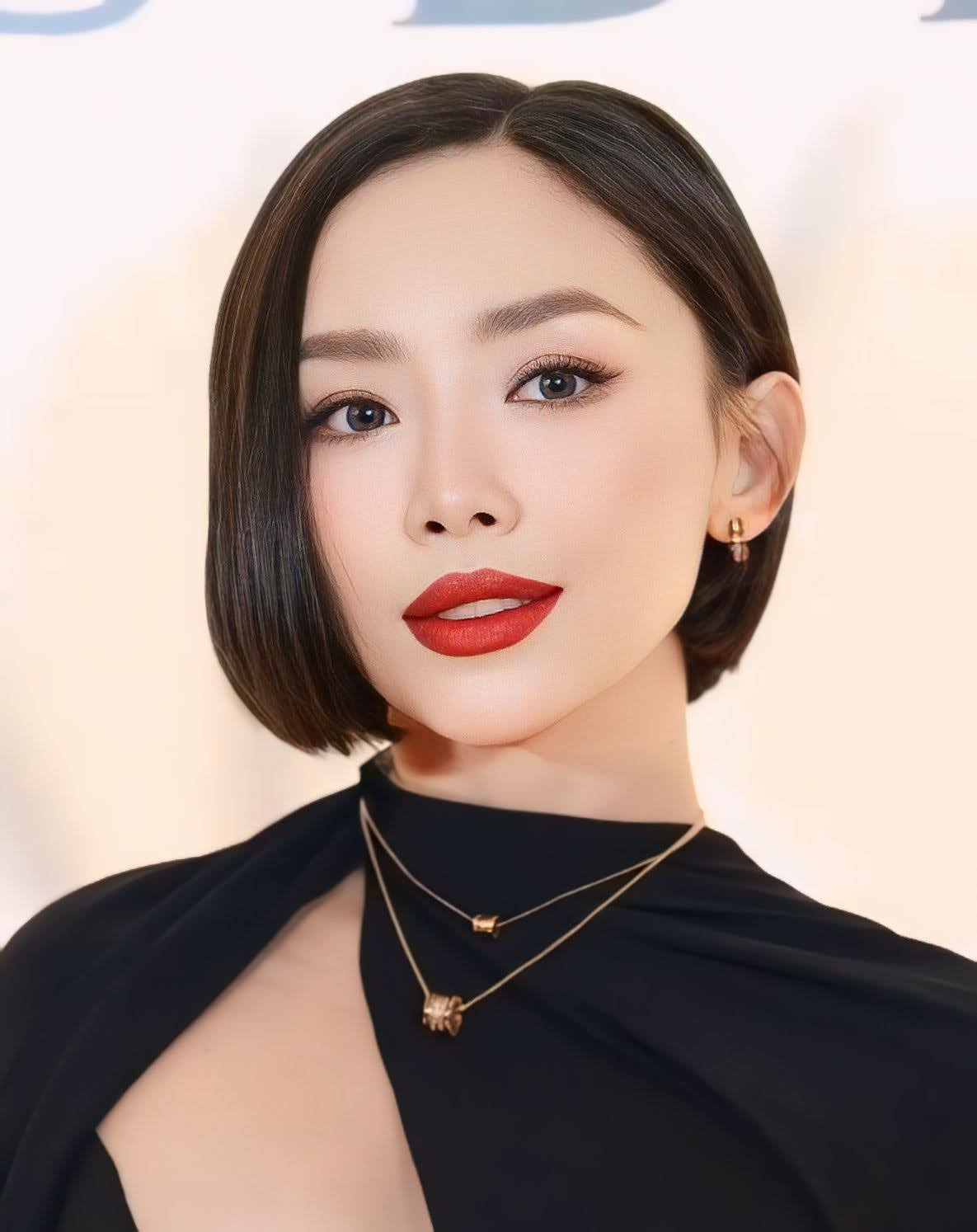
Tóc Tiên (2017–18)

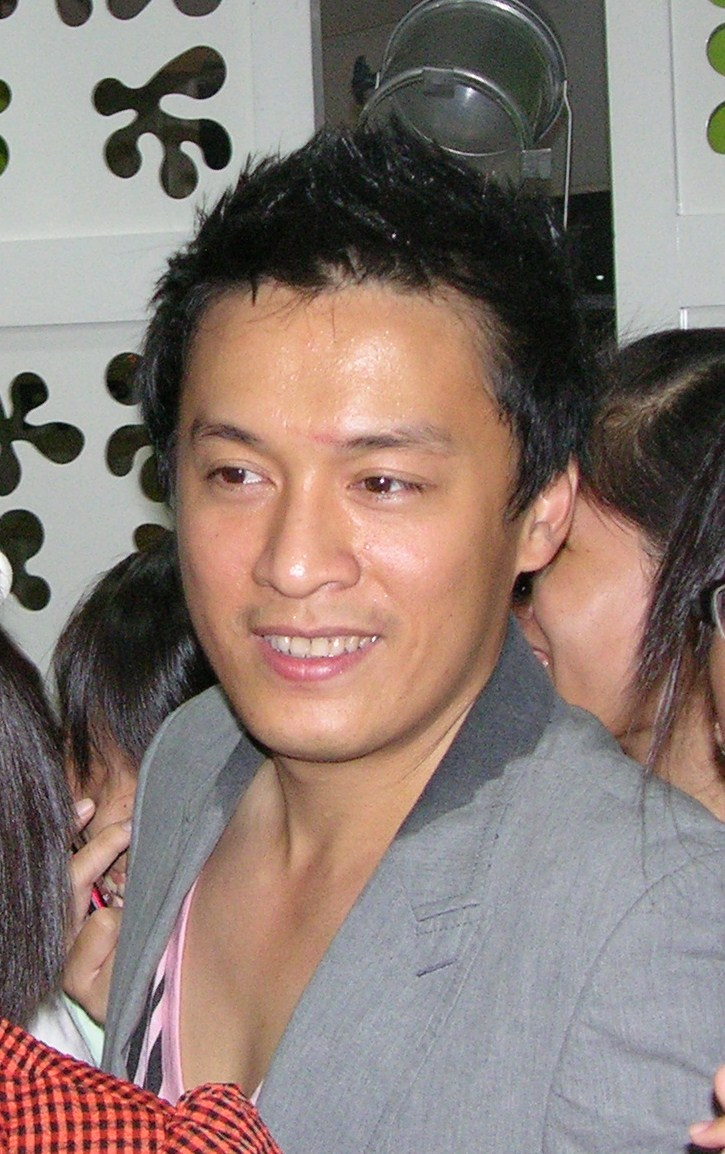
Lam Trường (2018)

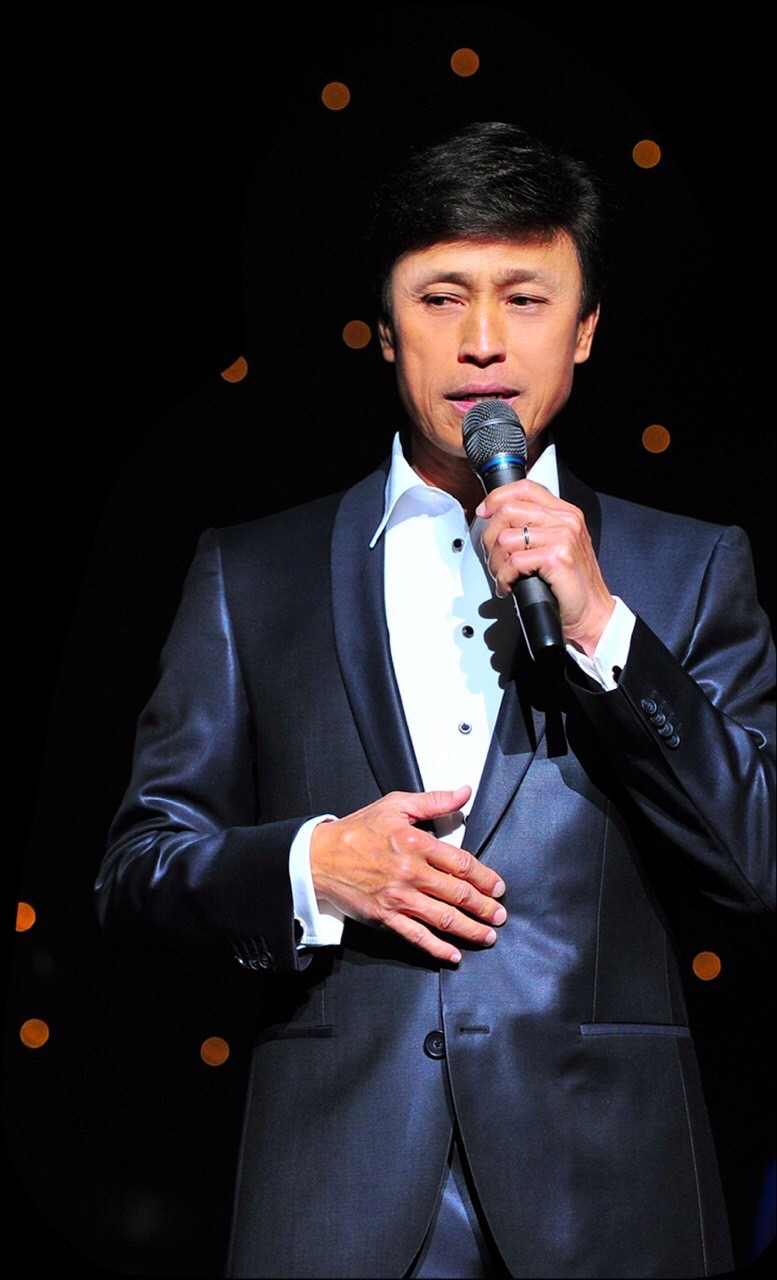
Tuấn Ngọc (2019)

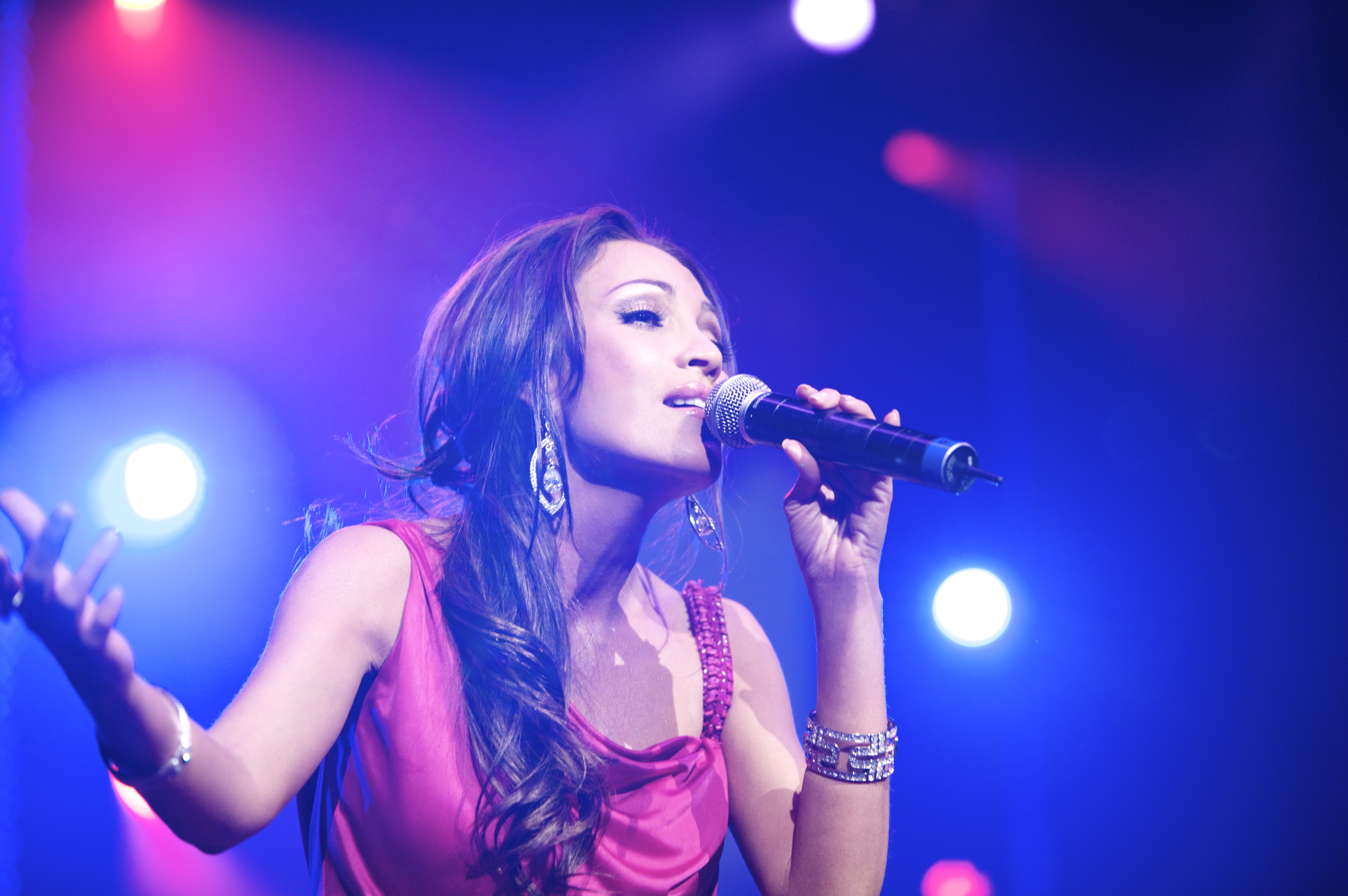
Thanh Hà (2019)

=== Timeline of coaches and hosts ===
Coaches	Seasons					
Coaches	1	2	3	4	5	6
Đàm Vĩnh Hưng						
Thu Minh						
Hồ Ngọc Hà						
Trần Lập (†)						
Mỹ Linh						
Hồng Nhung						
Quốc Trung						
Thu Phương						
Mỹ Tâm						
Tuấn Hưng						
Đông Nhi						
Noo Phước Thịnh						
Tóc Tiên						
Lam Trường						
Hồ Hoài Anh						
Tuấn Ngọc						
Thanh Hà						
Host	Seasons					
Host	1	2	3	4	5	6
Phan Anh						
Nguyên Khang						
Phí Linh						

=== Coaches' advisors ===
Season	Advisors			
1	Team Đàm Vĩnh Hưng	Team Thu Minh	Team Hồ Ngọc Hà	Team Trần Lập
1	Cẩm Vân & Elvis Phương	Hồng Nhung & Nguyễn Hải Phong	Hồ Quỳnh Hương & Thanh Bùi	Siu Black & Hồ Hoài Anh
2	Team Đàm Vĩnh Hưng	Team Mỹ Linh	Team Hồng Nhung	Team Quốc Trung
2	Nguyễn Ngọc Anh	Hồng Kiên	Thanh Bùi	Lưu Thiên Hương
3	Team Đàm Vĩnh Hưng	Team Thu Phương	Team Mỹ Tâm	Team Tuấn Hưng
3	Quang Linh	Hồng Nhung	Hoài Sa	Lệ Quyên
4	Team Noo Phước Thịnh	Team Thu Minh	Team Tóc Tiên	Team Đông Nhi
4	Phương Thanh (Battles); Hồ Ngọc Hà (Knockouts)	Khắc Hưng & Trung Quân (Battles); Hoài Sa, Shontelle (Knockouts)	Mỹ Linh (Battles); Siu Black (Knockouts)	Thanh Hà
5	Team Noo Phước Thịnh	Team Thu Phương	Team Tóc Tiên	Team Lam Trường
5	Hồ Hoài Anh	Dương Cầm	Trần Thu Hà	Nguyễn Hải Phong
6	Team Hồ Hoài Anh	Team Thanh Hà	Team Tuấn Ngọc	Team Tuấn Hưng
6	Long Halo	Noo Phước Thịnh & Addy Trần	Vũ Cát Tường	Nguyễn Hoàng Duy

== Series overview ==
Key

- Team Đàm Vĩnh Hưng
- Team Thu Minh
- Team Hồ Ngọc Hà
- Team Trần Lập
- Team Tuấn Ngọc
- Team Hồng Nhung
- Team Mỹ Linh
- Team Quốc Trung
- Team Lam Trường
- Team Tuấn Hưng
- Team Mỹ Tâm
- Team Thu Phương
- Team Hồ Hoài Anh
- Team Noo Phước Thịnh
- Team Đông Nhi
- Team Tóc Tiên
- Team Thanh Hà

Season	Premiere	Finale	Winner	Other finalists				Winning coach	Host	Backstage Host	Coaches			
Season	Premiere	Finale	Winner	Other finalists				Winning coach	Host	Backstage Host	1	2	3	4
1	8 July 2012	13 January 2013	Hương Tràm	Đinh Hương	Lê Phạm Xuân Nghi	Nguyễn Kiên Giang	In the first three seasons, there were only four finalists.	Thu Minh	Phan Anh	Phương Mai; V-Music	Đàm Vĩnh Hưng	Thu Minh	Hồ Ngọc Hà	Trần Lập
2	19 May 2013	11 November 2013	Vũ Thảo My	Nguyễn Hoàng Tôn	Vũ Cát Tường	Trần Vũ Hà My	In the first three seasons, there were only four finalists.	Đàm Vĩnh Hưng	Phan Anh	Yumi Dương	Mỹ Linh	Đàm Vĩnh Hưng	Hồng Nhung	Quốc Trung
3	10 May 2015	20 September 2015	Nguyễn Đức Phúc	Yến Lê	Nguyễn Hoàng Dũng	Trần Thị Tố Ny	In the first three seasons, there were only four finalists.	Mỹ Tâm	Phan Anh	Linh Sunny	Đàm Vĩnh Hưng	Mỹ Tâm	Thu Phương	Tuấn Hưng
4	12 February 2017	4 June 2017	Ali Hoàng Dương	Nguyễn Anh Tú	Nguyễn Hiền Mai	Hiền Hồ	Ngô Anh Đạt	Thu Minh	Nguyên Khang	Tim; Quỳnh Chi	Tóc Tiên	Thu Minh	Noo Phước Thịnh	Đông Nhi
5	20 May 2018	2 September 2018	Trần Ngọc Ánh	Đặng Thị Thái Bình	Trần Gia Nghi	Nguyễn Minh Ngọc	Dương Quốc Anh	Noo Phước Thịnh	Phí Linh	Ali Hoàng Dương	Thu Phương	Lam Trường	Tóc Tiên	Noo Phước Thịnh
6	14 April 2019	21 July 2019	Hoàng Đức Thịnh	Lâm Bảo Ngọc	DOMINIX	Layla	Trần; Lê-Bích; Tuyết	Tuấn Ngọc	Phí Linh	Ali Hoàng Dương	Hồ Hoài Anh	Thanh Hà	Tuấn Ngọc	Tuấn Hưng

=== Coaches' teams ===
Colour key:

- – Winner
- – Runner-up
- – Third place
- – Fourth place

Season	Đàm Vĩnh Hưng	Thu Minh	Hồ Ngọc Hà	Trần Lập (†)
1	Lê Phạm Xuân Nghi; Đồng Lan; Phan Ngọc Luân; Vũ Thanh Hằng; Nguyễn Trọng Khương	Hương Tràm; Trúc Nhân; Đỗ Xuân Sơn; Dương Trần Nghĩa; Nguyễn Khánh Phương Linh	Đinh Hương; Bùi Anh Tuấn; Tiêu Châu Như Quỳnh; Đào Bá Lộc; Nguyễn Thị Thái Trinh	Nguyễn Kiên Giang; Trần Thị Kim Loan †; Nguyễn Thùy Linh; Nguyễn Văn Thắng; Bảo Anh
2	Đàm Vĩnh Hưng	Mỹ Linh	Hồng Nhung	Quốc Trung
2	Vũ Thảo My; Nguyễn Song Tú; Nguyễn Ngọc Trâm; Nguyễn Trần Minh Sang; Nguyễn Văn Viết	Nguyễn Hoàng Tôn; Nguyễn Thái Quang; Dương Hoàng Yến; Trần Thị Diễm Hương; Trần Huyền My	Vũ Cát Tường; Phạm Hà Linh; Âu Bảo Ngân; Đỗ Thành Nam; Hoàng Nhật Minh	Trần Vũ Hà My; Trần Thái Châu; Đinh Thị My Hoàn; Phạm Khánh Duy; Nguyễn Lâm Hoàng Phúc
3	Đàm Vĩnh Hưng	Thu Phương	Mỹ Tâm	Tuấn Hưng
3	Trần Thị Tố Ny; Vicky Nhung; Thái Bảo Trâm; Phượng Vũ; Nguyễn Thùy Linh	Nguyễn Hoàng Dũng; Nguyễn Kiều Anh; Phùng Khánh Linh; Phạm Anh Duy; Kimmese	Nguyễn Đức Phúc; Nguyễn Cao Bảo Uyên; Phạm Vân Anh; Đào Ngọc Sang; Nguyễn Thu Thủy	Yến Lê; Thủy Bùi; Hoàng Mai Hạ Vy; Trần Đăng Quang; Nguyễn Diệu My
4	Noo Phước Thịnh	Thu Minh	Tóc Tiên	Đông Nhi
4	Nguyễn Hiền Mai; Ngô Anh Đạt; Nga Helen; Đặng Thu Hà	Ali Hoàng Dương; Trần Anh Đức; Trần Tùng Anh; Phạm Hải Anh	Hiền Hồ; Huỳnh Phương Mai; Nguyễn Dương Thuận; Đào Trọng Tín	Nguyễn Anh Tú; Han Sara; Trần Thị Huyền Dung; Nguyễn Thạc Giáng My
5	Noo Phước Thịnh	Thu Phương	Tóc Tiên	Lam Trường
5	Trần Ngọc Ánh; Trần Gia Nghi; Nguyễn Minh Ngọc; Đức Tâm & Hoàng Dương	Nguyễn Thị Thu Ngân; Huỳnh Thanh Thảo; Đỗ Thành Nghiệp; Đặng Thị Mỹ Hằng	Đặng Thị Thái Bình; Lưu Hiền Trinh; Lê Chánh Tín	Dương Quốc Anh; Huỳnh Phương Duy; Nguyễn Vũ Đoan Trang
6	Hồ Hoài Anh	Thanh Hà	Tuấn Ngọc	Tuấn Hưng
6	Layla; Juky San; Huỳnh Công Luận; Phạm Thị Bảo Trân	DOMINIX; Trần Lê Bích Tuyết; Diêu Ngọc Bích Trâm; Trần Đức Trường; Nguyễn Châu Nhi	Hoàng Đức Thịnh; Vũ Xuân Đạt; Văn Võ Ngọc Nhân	Lâm Bảo Ngọc; Trần Duy Đạt; Trần Hằng My

== Season synopses ==
=== Season 1 ===
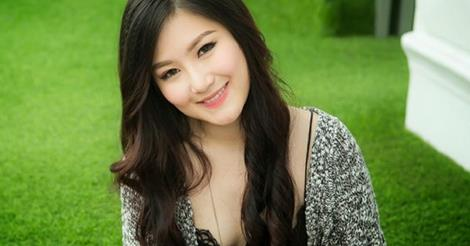
Hương Tràm, season one winner

The first season of The Voice of Vietnam began on 8 July 2012 and ended on 13 January 2013. The four original coaches are Đàm Vĩnh Hưng, Thu Minh, Hồ Ngọc Hà and Trần Lập, with Phan Anh hosting the show. This season didn't feature the "steal" and the Knockout round, contestant who won their battle were qualified for the live shows. Each coach was allowed to advance seven top to the live shows:

Team Đàm Vĩnh Hưng	Team Thu Minh	Team Hồ Ngọc Hà	Team Trần Lập
Lê Phạm Xuân Nghi	Phạm Thị Hương Tràm	Đinh Thị Thanh Hương	Nguyễn Kiên Giang
Đồng Lan	Nguyễn Trúc Nhân	Bùi Anh Tuấn	Trần Thị Kim Loan †
Phan Ngọc Luân	Đỗ Xuân Sơn	Tiêu Châu Như Quỳnh	Nguyễn Thùy Linh
Vũ Thanh Hằng	Dương Trần Nghĩa	Đào Bá Lộc	Nguyễn Văn Thắng
Nguyễn Trọng Khương	Nguyễn Khánh Phương Linh	Nguyễn Thị Thái Trinh	Nguyễn Hoài Bảo Anh
Phạm Dũng Hà	Đặng Thị Thu Thủy	Nguyễn Hương Giang	Huỳnh Anh Tuấn
Nguyễn Quỳnh Trang	Phạm Thị Ngân Bình	Thiều Bảo Trang	Nguyễn Thị Thảo Nguyên

=== Season 2 ===
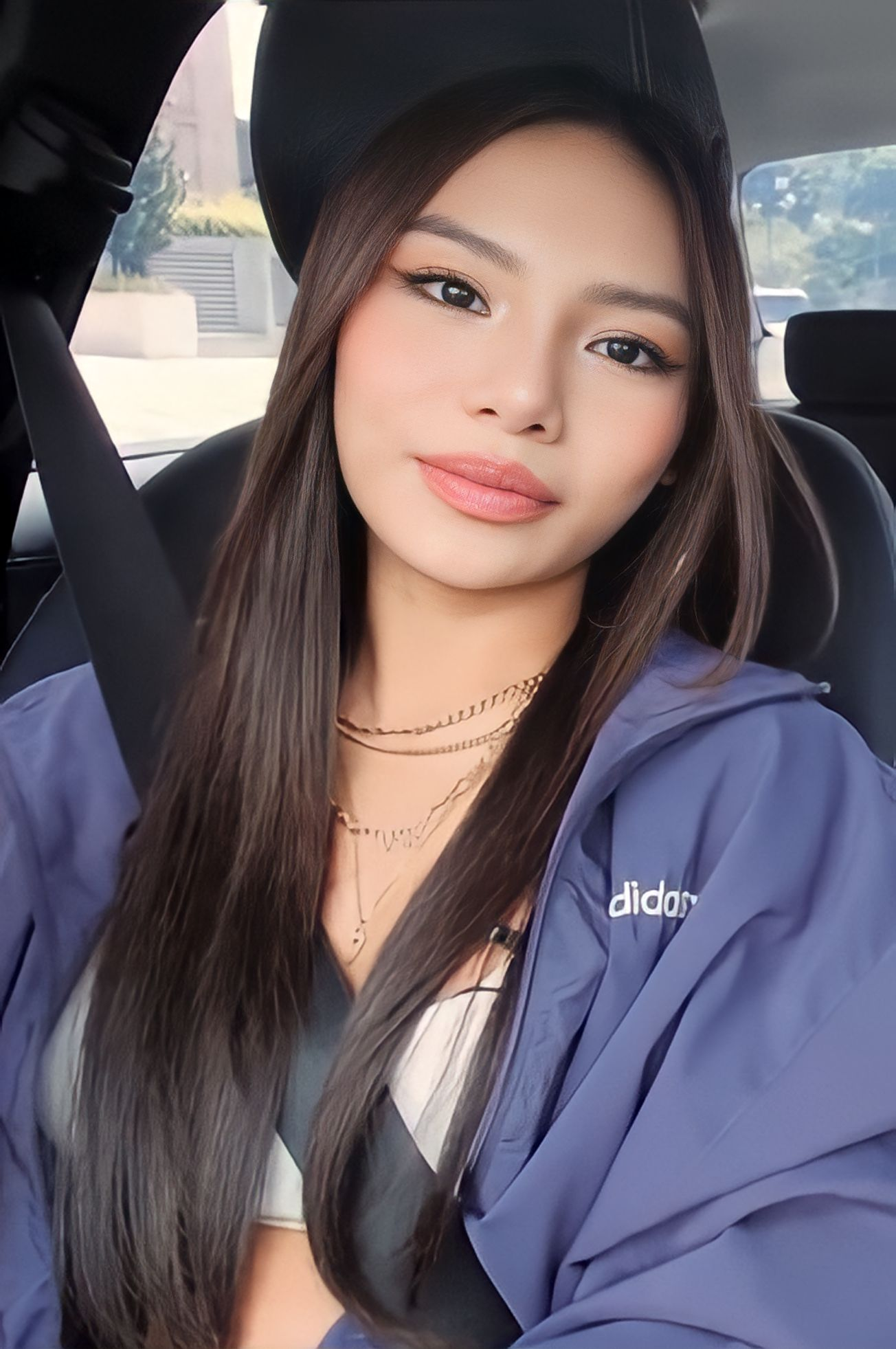
Vũ Thảo My, season two winner

Season 2 of The Voice of Vietnam began on 19 May 2013 and concluded on 15 December 2013. Three new coaches were Mỹ Linh, Hồng Nhung and Quốc Trung, while Đàm Vĩnh Hưng and Phan Anh returned as coach and host, respectively. This season adopted the "Steals" in the battles as well as the Knockout round. Each coach was allowed to advance five top to the live shows:

Team Mỹ Linh	Team Đàm Vĩnh Hưng	Team Hồng Nhung	Team Quốc Trung
Nguyễn Hoàng Tôn	Vũ Thảo My	Vũ Cát Tường	Trần Vũ Hà My
Nguyễn Thái Quang	Nguyễn Song Tú	Phạm Hà Linh	Trần Thái Châu
Dương Hoàng Yến	Nguyễn Ngọc Trâm	Âu Bảo Ngân	Đinh Thị My Hoàn
Trần Thị Diễm Hương	Nguyễn Trần Minh Sang	Đỗ Thành Nam	Phạm Khánh Duy
Trần Huyền My	Nguyễn Văn Viết	Hoàng Nhật Minh	Nguyễn Lâm Hoàng Phúc

=== Season 3 ===
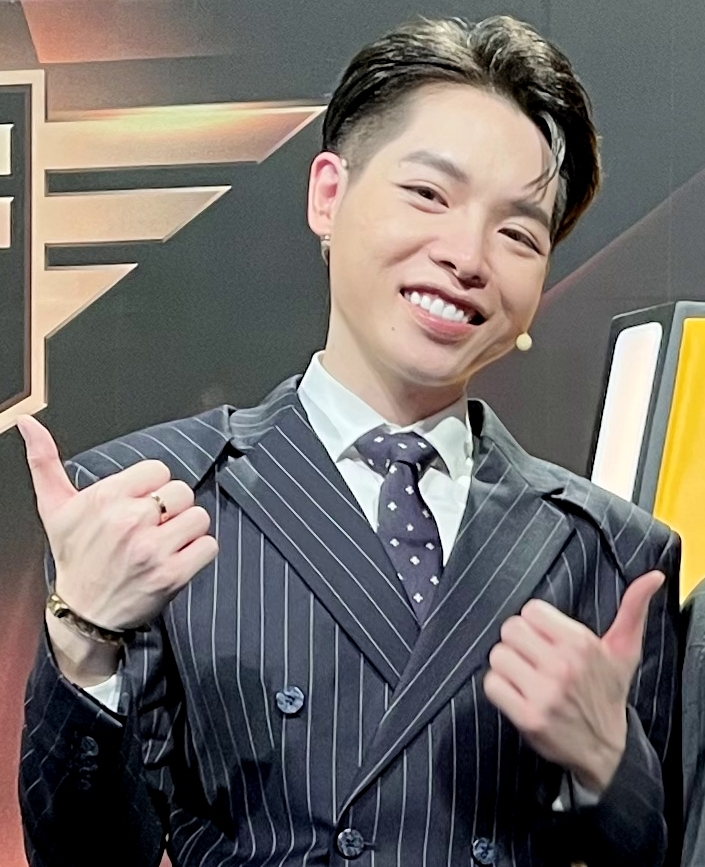
Đức Phúc, season three winner

Season 3 of The Voice of Vietnam began on 10 May 2015 and concluded on 20 September 2015. Đàm Vĩnh Hưng and Phan Anh returned for their third season as coach and host, respectively. Mỹ Tâm, Thu Phương, and Tuấn Hưng replaced Mỹ Linh, Hồng Nhung and Quốc Trung respectively. This season featured the "Steals" in the battles but did not have the Knockout round, contestant who won their battle were qualified for the live shows. Each coach was allowed to advance seven top to the live shows:

Team Đàm Vĩnh Hưng	Team Mỹ Tâm	Team Thu Phương	Team Tuấn Hưng
Trần Thị Tố Ny	Nguyễn Đức Phúc	Nguyễn Hoàng Dũng	Lê Thị Hải Yến
Vicky Nhung	Nguyễn Cao Bảo Uyên	Nguyễn Kiều Anh	Vũ Bùi Thu Thủy
Thái Ngọc Bảo Trâm	Phạm Thị Vân Anh	Phùng Khánh Linh	Hoàng Mai Hạ Vy
Phượng Vũ	Đào Ngọc Sang	Phạm Anh Duy	Trần Đăng Quang
Nguyễn Thị Thùy Linh	Nguyễn Thị Thu Thủy	Quách Cẩm Lê (Kimmese)	Nguyễn Diệu Mi
Lê Quốc Vương	Lê Thái Sơn	Lê Hữu Toàn	Trần Lan
Nguyễn Quỳnh Như	Yến Tatoo	Trần Thu Hòa	Nguyễn Thái Dương

=== Season 4 ===
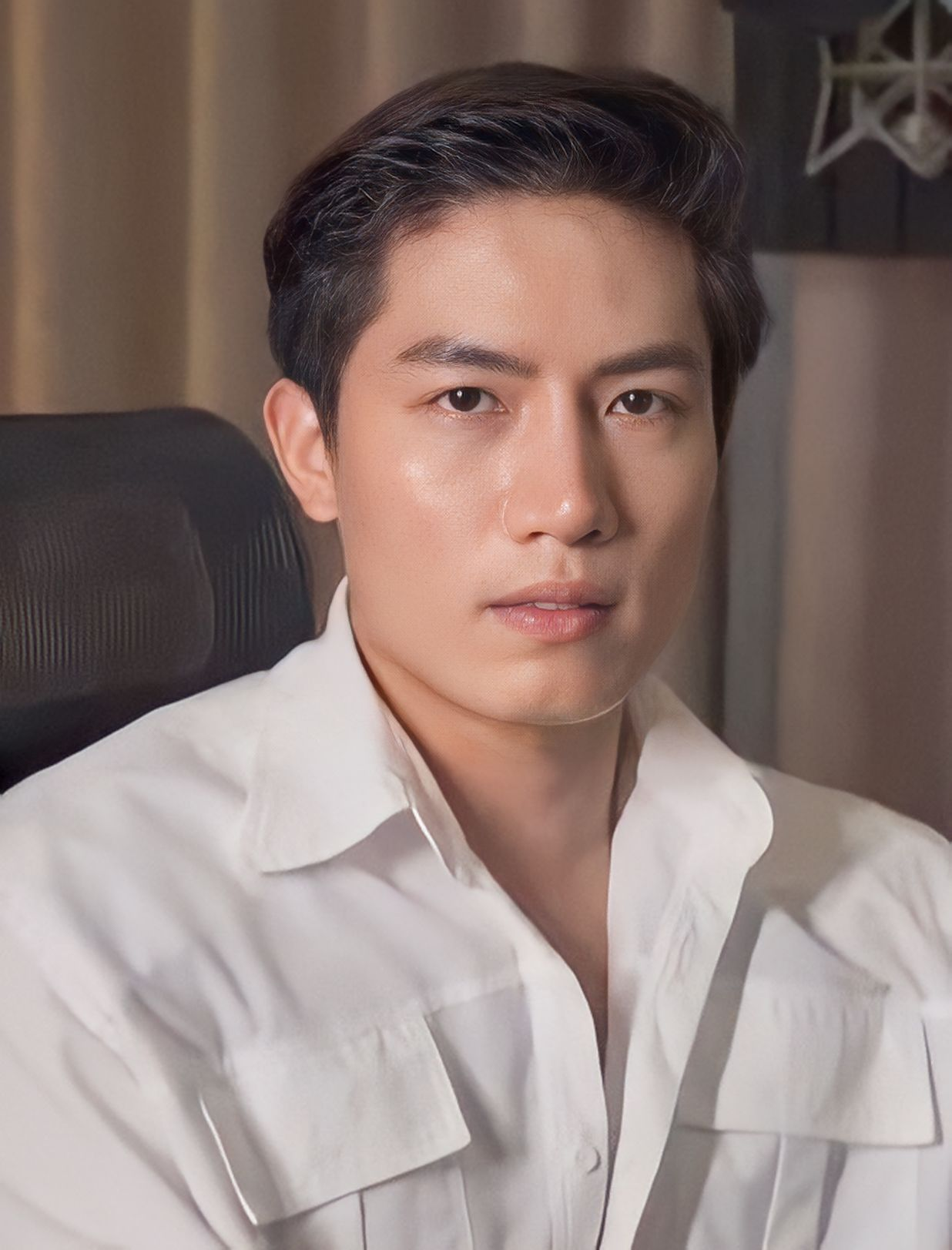
Anh Tú, season four runner-up

Season 4 of The Voice of Vietnam began on 12 February 2017 and concluded on 4 June 2017. Thu Minh returned to her red chair after a 2-season hiatus, along with three new coaches: Tóc Tiên, Noo Phước Thịnh and Đông Nhi. Each coach was allowed to advance four top to the live shows:

Team Tóc Tiên	Team Thu Minh	Team Noo Phước Thịnh	Team Đông Nhi
Hiền Hồ	Ali Hoàng Dương	Nguyễn Hiền Mai	Nguyễn Anh Tú
Huỳnh Phương Mai	Trần Anh Đức	Ngô Anh Đạt	Han Sara
Nguyễn Dương Thuận	Trần Tùng Anh	Phan Thị Thanh Nga	Trần Thị Huyền Dung
Đào Trọng Tín	Phạm Hải Anh	Đặng Thị Thu Hà	Nguyễn Thạc Giáng My

=== Season 5 ===
Season 5 of The Voice of Vietnam began on 20 May 2018 and concluded on 2 September 2018, with returning coaches Tóc Tiên, Noo Phước Thịnh, Thu Phương and new coach Lam Trường completing the panel. Because of the format change, the numbers of contestant advanced to the live shows are not equal among four teams. Contestants who advanced to the live shows included:

Team Thu Phương	Team Lam Trường	Team Tóc Tiên	Team Noo Phước Thịnh
Nguyễn Thị Thu Ngân	Dương Quốc Anh	Đặng Thị Thái Bình	Trần Ngọc Ánh
Huỳnh Thanh Thảo	Huỳnh Phương Duy	Lưu Hiền Trinh	Trần Gia Nghi
Đỗ Thành Nghiệp	Nguyễn Vũ Đoan Trang	Lê Chánh Tín	Nguyễn Minh Ngọc
Đặng Thị Mỹ Hằng	—	—	Đức Tâm & Hoàng Dương

=== Season 6 ===
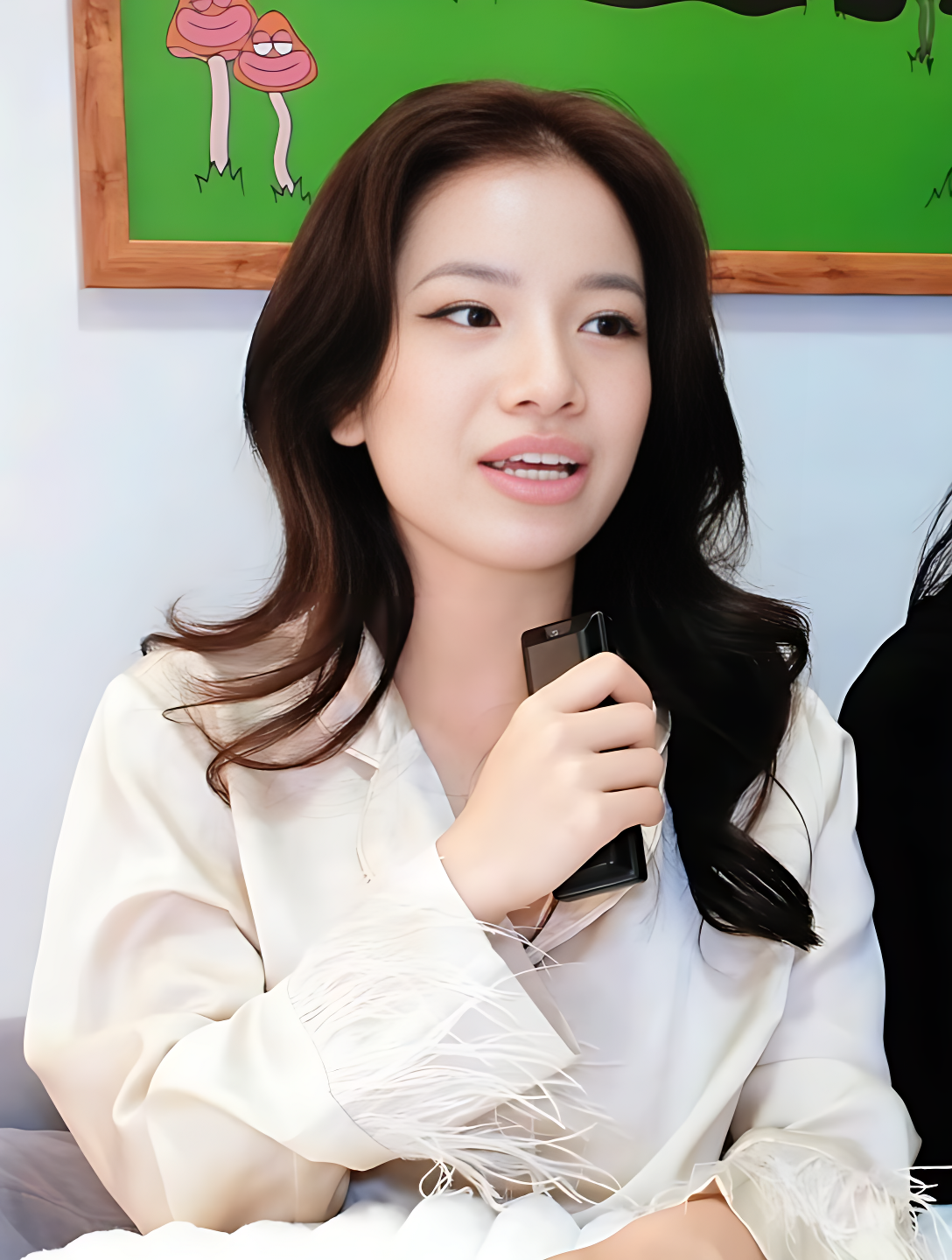
Lâm Bảo Ngọc, season six runner-up

Season 6 of The Voice of Vietnam began on 14 April 2019 and concluded on 14 July 2019, with returning coach Tuấn Hưng and new coaches Thanh Hà, Tuấn Ngọc and Hồ Hoài Anh. Contestants who advanced to the live shows included:

Team Hồ Hoài Anh	Team Thanh Hà	Team Tuấn Ngọc	Team Tuấn Hưng
Layla	DOMINIX	Hoàng Đức Thịnh	Lâm Bảo Ngọc
Juky San	Trần Lê Bích Tuyết	Vũ Xuân Đạt	Trần Duy Đạt
Huỳnh Công Luận	Diêu Ngọc Bích Trâm	Văn Võ Ngọc Nhân	Trần Hằng My
Phạm Thị Bảo Trân	Trần Đức Trường	—	—
—	Nguyễn Châu Nhi	—	—

== Kids Edition ==
After the success of the first season of The Voice, Cat Tien Sa announced that they would produce The Voice Kids, where 6-15 year-olds compete against each other. The first season was premiere on the Children's Day in Vietnam, 1 June 2013. The presenters were Trấn Thành and Thanh Thảo. There were three coaches instead of four: the husband-and-wife duo Hồ Hoài Anh and Lưu Hương Giang, Hiền Thục and Thanh Bùi.

For Season 2 in 2014, Hồ Hoài Anh and Lưu Hương Giang returned along with two new coaches, Cẩm Ly and Lam Trường. New presenters were Thanh Bạch and Jennifer Phạm. For the third season premiered in July 2015, The X Factor Vietnam judge Dương Khắc Linh replaced Lam Trường, while the duo Giang Hồ and singer Cẩm Ly remained.

After Season 3 finale, it was announced that the Giang Hồ duo would leave the show because of Lưu Hương Giang's pregnancy. Hồ Hoài Anh then moved to become the show's music executive. As Cẩm Ly also stated not to return either, Cat Tien Sa decided to refresh the judging panel with younger singers in Vietnam. Đông Nhi and Ông Cao Thắng were the first coaches confirmed for Season 4. Noo Phước Thịnh came on board in early April. Even though rumors stated that the fourth coach would be Sơn Tùng M-TP, on 6 June 2016, it was officially confirmed that The Voice of Vietnam Season 2 runner-up Vũ Cát Tường would become a coach.

On 28 May 2017, in an interview, Soobin Hoàng Sơn revealed that he has signed to become a coach for The Voice Kids Season 5. On 11 June 2017, Vũ Cát Tường announced her return to the show. On 26 June 2017, the double chair was revealed to be composed of Hương Tràm, The Voice season 1 winner, and musician Tiên Cookie. Actor and comedian Thành Trung joined the show as host for Season 5.

On 12 July 2018, the show's producers announced that all coaches for Season 6 would be duos, and that former coaches Hồ Hoài Anh and Lưu Hương Giang would return for the sixth season. A week later, Vũ Cát Tường confirmed to be returning to the show for her third year. The following day, Soobin Hoàng Sơn also confirmed to be returning, while former The Voice Season 1 contestant Bảo Anh was announced as a new coach. On July 31, music producer Khắc Hưng was announced as the new sixth coach for the sixth season. On the taping day at 2 August 2018, it was revealed that the two new coaches would form a new duo coach, whereas Soobin and Vũ Cát Tường would combine as a duo coach. The Voice Season 4 winner Ali Hoàng Dương was appointed as the new host for Season 6. This season marks the first time in any version of The Voice worldwide to have three different duo coaches, and the second time that the judging panel consists of six coaches, following the Belgian-Flemish version.

On 12 June 2019, three new duo coaches were announced for Season 7 as: musician Dương Cầm and 2018 Miss International Queen Hương Giang, Ali Hoàng Dương and Lưu Thiên Hương, and Dương Khắc Linh and Phạm Quỳnh Anh; while Hồ Hoài Anh would once again become the music executive. A reimagined eighth season premiered in January 2021 with BigDaddy & Emily, Hưng Cao and Vũ Cát Tường, and Hồ Hoài Anh and Lưu Hương Giang as three duo coaches.
