= Ming (given name) =

Ming is a transliteration of multiple Chinese given names. Notable people with these names include:

- Ming Chen (born 1974), Taiwanese American actor
- Ming Chin (born 1942), American jurist of Chinese descent
- Fu Ming (born 1983), Chinese football referee
- Gao Ming (c. 1305–1370), Chinese poet and playwright
- Huang Ming (皇明), a name for the Ming dynasty
- Huang Ming (politician) (黄明; born 1957), Deputy Minister of Public Security of China
- Huang Ming (military officer) (黄铭; born 1963), Deputy Commander of the People's Liberation Army Ground Force.
- Huang Ming (entrepreneur) (黄鸣; born 1958), founder of Himin Solar
- Huang Ming (actor) (黄明; born 1986), an actor from China.
- Lee Meng (Chinese: 李明; pinyin: Lǐ Míng; 1926–2012), Chinese Communist guerrilla leader in Malaya
- Leon Lai (Chinese: 黎明; pinyin: Lí Míng; born 1966), Hong Kong singer and actor
- Li Ming (banker) (Chinese: 李銘; pinyin: Lǐ Míng; 1887-1966), Chinese banker
- Li Ming (footballer, born 1971) (Chinese: 李明; pinyin: Lǐ Míng), Chinese football player
- Li Ming (footballer, born 1975) (Chinese: 李明; pinyin: Lǐ Míng), Chinese football player and coach
- Li Ming (footballer, born 2000) (Chinese: 李明; pinyin: Lǐ Míng), Chinese football player
- Li Ming (diplomat) (Chinese: 李明; pinyin: Lǐ Míng), Chinese ambassador to Serbia
- Ming Li, Canadian computer scientist
- Ming C. Lin, Taiwanese American computer scientist
- Ju Ming (born 1938), Taiwanese sculptor
- Ming Sen Shiue (born 1950), Taiwanese-American murderer, kidnapper, and rapist
- Ming Tsai (born 1964), celebrity chef
- Xi Ming (born 1989), Chinese model
- Xu Ming (1971–2015), Chinese entrepreneur
- Xu Ming (figure skater) (born 1981), Chinese figure skater
- Xue Ming (born 1987), Chinese volleyball player
- Yao Ming (born 1980), Chinese basketball player
- Yan Ming (empress dowager) (died 152), empress dowager of the Han dynasty
- Yen Ming (born 1949), Taiwanese general
- Yan Ming (swimmer) (born 1969), Chinese swimmer
- Shi Yan Ming, Shaolin warrior monk
- Yan Ming (painter), (1917–2005, a Chinese painter and art educator
- Xiao Tong (萧统), formally Crown Prince Zhao Ming (昭明太子), son of Emperor Wu of the Liang Dynasty (502-577) compiler of the Zhao Ming essays, the first anthology of essays in China
- Zhao Ming of Shang, the second ruler of Predynastic Shang.
- Zhao Ming, film director; director of The Adventures of Sanmao the Waif (1949)
- Zhao Ming (footballer, born 1984) (赵铭 born 1984), Chinese football player
- Zhao Ming (footballer, born 1987) (赵铭 born 1987), Chinese football player
- Zhao Ming (actress) (赵铭 1987), Chinese actress who appears in the film Let the Bullets Fly 2010

== Fictional ==
- Ming Lee, mother of Meilin Lee in Turning Red
- Ming the Merciless, a comic book character and archenemy of Flash Gordon
- Ming-Ming Duckling, a character from Wonder Pets!
- ”Ming”, a character from The Amazing Digital Circus

== See also ==
- Ming (surname) (明)
- Emperor Ming, multiple persons
