= Phùng Khánh Linh =

Vietnamese singer and songwriter (born 1994)

Phung Khanh Linh
- Phùng Khánh Linh
- Born: May 7, 1994 (age 32); Bắc Giang, Vietnam
- Occupations: Singer; Songwriter
- Years active: 2015–
- Height: 150 cm (4 ft 11 in)
- Musical career
- Genres: Synth Pop; City Pop; Indie; Ballad; V-pop; Dream Pop; Alternative Pop; Alternative Rock; R&B
- Instruments: Vocals; Guitar
- Labels: Independent (2015 - 2020); Times Records (2020 - 2024); Universal Music Vietnam (2020 - 2021); Black Swan Label (2024 - present)
- Website: phungkhanhlinh.com

Phùng Khánh Linh (Note: In this Vietnamese name, the surname is Phùng. In accordance with Vietnamese custom, this person should be referred to by the given name, Linh.) (born May 7, 1994) is a Vietnamese singer and songwriter. She first gained public attention as a contestant in the 2015 The Voice of Vietnam, joining coach Thu Phương's team, before releasing the single "Hôm Nay Tôi Buồn" in 2018. In 2020, she joined Times Records and released her first extended play 7 Deep Cuts Session, as a pre-launch for her debut studio album, Yesteryear (2020). To mark her 18th birthday, she released the 11-track compilation album The Early Recordings (2022). Her second studio album, Citopia (2022), was preceded by lead single "Sweet Summer", which became her fastest single to reach number one on the iTunes Store, doing so within an hour of release.

Phùng Khánh Linh announced her departure from Times Records and signed with Black Swan Label in July 2024, ahead of her third studio album, Among Ten Thousand (Note: Official English title for Giữa Một Vạn Người.) (2025). It became her most successful album to date, accumulating over 10 million streams on Spotify in its first month; its track "Ghosting" drew public attention with roughly 150 million views across short-form video platforms. An expanded edition of the album, adding five tracks for a total of 17, followed on August 11, 2026.

In February 2026, Phùng Khánh Linh's soundtrack single "Cảm Ơn Người Đã Thức Cùng Tôi", taken from the film A Little Dream of Me, became her first song to enter the Billboard Vietnam Hot 100 and the Billboard Vietnam Top Vietnamese Songs, both of which reached number one at its second week.

As of August 2026, she has been nominated ten times for the Dedication Music Awards and once for the Mai Vàng Awards. In the Green Wave Awards, she has received three nominations, with one win (Top 10 Most Favorite Female Singer/Rapper).

== Early life ==
Phùng Khánh Linh was born in 1994 in Bắc Giang, into a family with no background in the arts. Her father, a civil servant, died in 2025; her mother is a teacher, and she has an older brother. She studied at Bắc Giang High School for the Gifted, then graduated with a law degree from Trade Union University. She became interested in music at age 3; because her father initially opposed a singing career, she performed only on school stages and at the local Pioneers Palace, and began attempting to write her own songs around 2016, work she has since described as still fairly unpolished.

After her elimination from The Voice of Vietnam, Phùng Khánh Linh considered becoming a music teacher at her family's suggestion, and topped the entrance exam for the National University of Arts Education - but chose not to enroll, insisting on pursuing music instead and eventually building her career in Ho Chi Minh City. Before establishing herself as a singer, she supported herself partly by teaching part-time at a music school and running an online side business; in an interview with Idol14, she said she still maintains that online business to help fund her music projects.

== Career ==
=== 2015 – 2019: Recognition in The Voice of Vietnam season 3, breakthrough with "Hôm Nay Tôi Buồn" ===
On May 10, 2015, Phùng Khánh Linh first appeared in the third season of The Voice of Vietnam. She chose "Maps" by Maroon 5 for her blind audition, becoming one of only two contestants approved by all four coaches, and joined coach Thu Phương's team. On August 16, 2015, she performed her first original song, "On My Way", (Note: Official English title for "Chạy".) marking her debut single. She was eliminated in the show's seventh live broadcast (quarterfinal round) on August 30, 2015.

In 2016, she appeared in several musical television shows and worked on two more songs, including "Hãy Bảo Nắng Về Đi" and "Cô Gái Nhỏ và Anh". Later that year, her official SoundCloud account was created, where she independently posted original songs and covers. In 2017, working with musician Trang Chim Sâu, Phùng Khánh Linh released "Điều Còn Lại" on February 9 for Valentine's Day, and a graduation song "Lời Hứa Ngày Chia Tay" on April 27. Her first ever written song, "One Sided Love", was released on October 8, 2017, telling a cute budding love story. The song did not make much of a public impression.

Starting 2018, Phùng Khánh Linh announced the release of "Hôm Nay Tôi Buồn" on February 1. The song saw a huge success, with 104 million streams in the first half of 2018 recorded by Zing Chart, one of the most popular music streaming services in Vietnam. It was also among the seven songs that exceeded 100 million streams on the platform during this period. It is by far the most watched music video from Phùng Khánh Linh, achieving relatively 80 million views on YouTube alone. Widely recognized by both the public and critics, Phùng Khánh Linh received her first nominations at grand music awards, including New Artist of the Year and Song of the Year at the 14th Dedication Music Awards (2019) and Best New Artist at the 21st Green Wave Awards (2018).

=== 2020 – 2023: Yesteryear, in-between projects and Citopia ===
On February 13, 2020, Phùng Khánh Linh released the Valentine's single "Chocolate". On February 29, 2020, she signed her first contract with Times Records - becoming its first exclusive artist - and joined Universal Music Vietnam as its first signee five months later. Gearing up for her debut studio album, Phùng Khánh Linh released her first extended play 7 Deep Cuts Session on April 14, 2020.

Phùng Khánh Linh officially launched the new album cycle with its lead single "World Without You" (Note: Official English title for "Thế Giới Không Anh".) on July 31, 2020. The song was written in April 2019. Its music video, directed by Đinh Hà Uyên Thư, featured Phùng Khánh Linh as a girl in a fictional Lynese (Note: Phùng Khánh Linh's fandom name before 2024.) tribe, falling in love with a traveler. Concept for the video was inspired by ethnic cultures of Yao people and H'mong people. The single was marketed with two mini games, which fans could win a physical copy of "World Without You" and its merchandise. A public premiere was scheduled on its release date; however, it was eventually scrapped due to COVID-19 restrictions. "Pack My Things and Leave" (Note: Official English title for "Gói Tình Em Rồi Về".) became the next promotional single on October 23, 2020. A fan contest to share thoughts about the song was held where thirteen winners would receive an invitation to her private party celebrating the premiere of Yesteryear.

The album title was revealed on November 1, 2020, followed by the showcase of producers and musicians working on the project. On December 3, 2020, she released her debut studio album Yesteryear with 13 self-written songs. The album spans genres of R&B, synth-pop, ballad and disco-pop. Upon its release, Yesteryear received favorable reviews, regarded as a breakthrough of V-pop in the early 2020s. Quang Duc from Znews highlighted her musical transformation to a more mature approach compared to her previous works. Exceeding 1,000 physical copies in its first two weeks, the album was restocked for another thousand, according to Times Records. On December 13, 2020, the roughly 300-capacity promotional showcase for Yesteryear sold out within days of going on sale. The album spawned three other singles, with "He Said She Said" as a message of artists getting their own creative control, inspired by stories of Britney Spears' freedom from her conservatorship and Taylor Swift to gain ownership of her masters. Music video for the third single "Dance in the City" is conceptualized by the painting of the same title by Pierre-Auguste Renoir and tarot reading. Its final single, "One Blue Day" is a synth-pop ballad, telling the continuation of the story from "Hôm Nay Tôi Buồn". Yesteryear was reissued twice, as a deluxe version with three new tracks on September 2, 2021, and an exclusive super deluxe version featuring demos and remixes to celebrate its first anniversary on December 25, 2021. The album successfully brought Phùng Khánh Linh two nominations at the 16th Dedication Music Awards (2021) for Album of the Year and Songwriter of the Year. She was also nominated at the 2021 Mai Vàng Awards for Favorite Ballad Artist.

On December 28, 2021, Phùng Khánh Linh released her standalone single "No Strings Attached", (Note: Official English title for "Lửa Gần Rơm Lâu Ngày Cũng Bén".) produced by electronic music duo 39 Kingdom. Hồ Việt Quân directed its music video. The single also sold 1,000 physical copies during its release. The song reached number 93 on the Billboard Vietnam chart, and was a fusion between electronic dance music and traditional folk music Quan họ originated from Bắc Ninh, Vietnam, which Phùng Khánh Linh said to be the sound she grew up with. The single received mixed reviews from music critics, who criticized the traditional value of Quan họ being modernized, whereas others complimented on her musical transformation from Yesteryear.

On May 8, 2022, one day after Phùng Khánh Linh's 18th birthday, she announced the release of The Early Recordings, which compiled works from her early years, including "On My Way" as performed on The Voice of Vietnam. "Mai Này", originally a soundtrack from Ngốc Ơi Tuổi 17, also made its appearance in the track listing, along with the digital single "Chocolate" being a bonus track in the physical version of the album.

On July 20, 2022, it was shared on Phùng Khánh Linh's social media that she was on the final process for her next album recorded in Nashville, USA. Five days later, she announced the second album title to be Citopia. Its first pre-release single, "Sweet Summer" (Note: Official English title for "Căn Gác Mùa Hè".) was released on August 30, 2022, becoming her fastest single to reach number one on iTunes Store after one hour of release. "After All" (Note: Official English title for "Năm Ngoái Giờ Này".) became the second pre-release single on October 10, 2022. The last two-week countdown featured Phùng Khánh Linh promoting lyric excerpts on the streets of Ho Chi Minh City, which almost bears a resemblance to her music video for the last single "Secret Sunday" on November 18, 2022. On November 11, 2022, Phùng Khánh Linh officially released her second studio album Citopia with 10 city pop-oriented tracks. Working on the album, she was heavily inspired by the genre and took inspirations from Japanese artists Mariya Takeuchi and Anri specifically. The album was praised by its huge production, recruiting her long-time producer partner Josh Frigo, Grammy-nominated producer Steven Wilson and three-time Grammy winner saxophonist Jovan Quallo; it is also her second project with mastering engineer Randy Merrill who has previously worked with Lady Gaga, Ariana Grande and Taylor Swift. It was also highly appreciated by The Japan Times, which described the record as more than a mere revival of the city pop sound. At the end of 2022, Citopia earned Phùng Khánh Linh three nominations at the 17th Dedication Music Awards for Songwriter of the Year, Female Artist of the Year and Album of the Year. The album has surpassed 10 million streams on Spotify.

On February 1, 2023, "Hôm Nay Tôi Buồn" was remastered to commemorate its fifth anniversary, plus a new country rearrangement entitled Nashville version.

=== 2024 –: Among Ten Thousand and Giữa Một Vạn Tour ===
On June 29, 2024, Times Records announced the conclusion of its exclusive contract with Phùng Khánh Linh. She subsequently signed with Black Swan Label, an artist management subsidiary of Times Records. Phùng Khánh Linh first hinted her new album by introducing her alter ego Diệu Hiền, a news reporter from PKL3 (Note: referred to as Phùng Khánh Linh's third (3rd) album.) channel. On September 6, 2024, she released the first pre-release single "Wish You Hell", (Note: Official English title for "Ướt Anh Tan Nát Con Tim".) three months before launching her third studio album announcement on December 11, 2024. Phùng Khánh Linh expressed her anger in the song as a "healing process and moving on from a situationship with little commitment". On January 3, 2025, the second single "Love May Die But I Will Not" (Note: Official English title for "Em Đau".) was released featuring Vietnamese rapper Thành Luke. An accompanying music video, directed by Hồ Việt Quân and Uin, was released on the same day, capturing Phùng Khánh Linh in her own funeral of love. In a reaction video from YouTube, she shared its writing process being after the funeral of her father took place, also stating: "It (the song) is not meant to glamorize the pain longing for the ones that leave, but a hug to those who stay."

The following month, Phùng Khánh Linh announced a five-night promotional tour Off The Record, beginning from March 29, 2025. It garnered a total of 2,000 attendees through five shows. The tour showcased intimate performances among bar venues across cities of Hanoi, Da Nang and Ho Chi Minh City. One musical guest was invited each night to be the opening act of the show, including Em Ellata, Trúc, Quàng Quanh, Thức, and Vĩ. On the third night in Hanoi, Haisam joined the stage with Phùng Khánh Linh to perform their collaboration "Thôi Anh Không Làm Thêm Đâu Babi" and promote his two songs "Henessy" and "Những Vì Tinh Tú Trong Mắt Em". Apart from the new songs, its setlist contains most of Phùng Khánh Linh's first two albums Yesteryear and Citopia, plus a secret song that has never been released. Two more singles were released during the tour, including "Idontwannaseeyouanymore" (Note: Official English title for "Khóc Blóck".) on May 28, 2025, and "Midnight Conversations" (Note: Official English title for "Tâm Sự Với Đêm Một Mình".) on August 9, 2025. During an interlude from the last show, on September 20, 2025, she announced her partnership with the photo-sharing app Locket to share exclusive contents regarding her upcoming third album. A countdown started before the announcement with the track list shown cryptically by just initials. These new track titles were later revealed on social platforms, by artists and celebrities that are known to be close with Phùng Khánh Linh. On October 18, 2025, her third studio album Among Ten Thousand was released, featuring 12 tracks that blended alternative pop, dream pop, punk and indie rock. The album peaked at number one on Apple Music Vietnam, with all of the tracks occupying the top 12 within the Alternative category of the platform. The album also earned her a nomination for Album of the Year at the 28th Green Wave Awards (2025), and an honorary award Đóa Hồng Nhạc Việt for "Love May Die But I Will Not". Continuing with the success of the release, Phùng Khánh Linh made her first appearance as the opener for the Genfest Music Festival in Hanoi on January 17, 2026, attracting nearly 10,000 attendees.

Phùng Khánh Linh also participated in other music projects throughout the era. On December 4, 2025, she was featured in The Flob's album Tối Thượng, on the final track "Thì Vui Biết Mấy". To promote the song, Phùng Khánh Linh joined their 2026 Đại Đồng tour on both nights in Hanoi and Ho Chi Minh City, where she also performed singles from Among Ten Thousand. On December 10, 2025, her first Christmas song with nae&de'lay was released under the title "Đắp Chăn Bông", succeeded by a digital single "Thành Phố Phía Đông" on January 11, 2026, originally a solo from Vương Bình. "Đủ Nắng Hoa Sẽ Nở" was released on February 2, 2026 with Văn Mai Hương and (S)TRONG for the previous 2025 WeChoice Awards.

After a three-month teaser of her upcoming concert tour, on February 2, 2026, Phùng Khánh Linh officially announced her first ever solo tour Giữa Một Vạn Tour to be embarked in Ho Chi Minh City as her first stop. Having tickets sold out in just 10 minutes, the initial one-day plan was soon extended to be a two-night show due to high demand. Following the announcement, she released "Pretend" (Note: Official English title for "Giả Vờ") on March 18, 2026, as a bonus track to Among Ten Thousand, describing it as a prequel to the album. The first two shows took place on March 21 and March 22, 2026, at the Hoa Binh Theatre, with an expected audience of 4,000 people attending in total.

The tour was later extended to Hanoi, in Vietnam National Convention Center for two nights on August 8 and August 9, 2026, which reportedly attracted 8,000 attendees in total. Notably, "Break Broke Broken" (Note: Official English title for "Hẹn Gặp Lại Anh Ở Một Khung Trời Khác". Initially entitled "demo032423" as it was shared via Phùng Khánh Linh's TikTok in 2023.), which was previously teased as an interlude during Ho Chi Minh City dates, was performed live for the first time, three days ahead of the release of Among Ten Thousand (Extended Edition), including five new tracks. Phùng Khánh Linh concluded Giữa Một Vạn Tour with a one-night-only show at Phú Thọ Indoor Stadium on October 17, 2026, featuring a revised setlist with all seventeen tracks from Among Ten Thousand and additions from her older albums, while moving the theatrical production to an arena setting. The concert won critical praise for her singing ability and charisma on stage.

== Discography ==
=== Studio albums ===
Title	Album details	Sales
Yesteryear	Released: December 3, 2020; Label: Times; Format: CD; LP; cassette; digital download; streaming	VIE: 3,000
Citopia	Released: November 11, 2022; Label: Times; Format: CD; LP; Box set; cassette; digital download; streaming	VIE: 5,000
Among Ten Thousand (Giữa Một Vạn Người)	Released: October 18, 2025; Label: Black Swan; Format: CD; LP; Box set; cassette; digital download; streaming	—N/a

=== Reissues ===
Title	Album details	Sales
Yesteryear (Deluxe)	Released: December 2, 2021; Label: Times; Format: Digital download; streaming	—N/a
Yesteryear (Super Deluxe)	Released: December 25, 2021; Label: Times; Format: CD	—N/a
Among Ten Thousand (Extended Edition) [Giữa Một Vạn Người (Mở Rộng)]	Released: August 11, 2026; Label: Black Swan; Format: CD; digital download; streaming	—N/a

=== Compilation album ===
Title	Album details	Sales
The Early Recordings (Những Bản Thu Thanh Đầu Tiên)	Released: May 5, 2022; Label: Times; Format: CD; digital download; streaming	—N/a

=== Extended play ===
Title	Album details	Sales
7 Deep Cuts Session	Released: April 20, 2020; Label: Times; Format: Digital download; streaming	—N/a
Renewal of the Heart: Phung Khanh Linh Tet Compilation with Commentary	Released: January 26, 2026; Label: Black Swan; Format: Digital download; streaming	—N/a

=== Singles ===
==== As lead artist ====
Name	Year	Album
"On My Way" (Chạy - Sáng Tối)	2015	The Early Recordings
"Cô Gái Nhỏ và Anh"	2016	Non-album single
"One Sided Love"	2017	The Early Recordings
"Điều Còn Lại"	2017	Non-album single
"Hôm Nay Tôi Buồn"	2018	The Early Recordings
"Trên Ô Cửa Máy Bay"	2019	The Early Recordings
"Thành Phố Xa Lạ"	2019	The Early Recordings
"Em Về Trời"	2019	The Early Recordings
"Cảm Ơn Vì Đã Lắng Nghe"	2019	The Early Recordings
"Liệu Anh Có Nghe"	2019	The Early Recordings
"Mẹ ơi, Cho Con Về Nhà" (with Trang)	2019	Non-album single
"Chocolate"	2020	Non-album single
"World Without You" (Thế Giới Không Anh) (Note: includes a physical release.)	2020	Yesteryear
"He Said She Said" (Cô Gái Nhân Ái)	2020	Yesteryear
"Dance In The City" (Chỉ Còn Lại Hai Ta)	2021	Yesteryear
"One Blue Day" (Chỉ Buồn Hôm Nay)	2021	Yesteryear
"Digital Medicine" (Một Liều Thuốc)	2021	Yesteryear
"Lonely" (Cô Đơn Sớm Tối)	2021	Yesteryear
"No Strings Attached" (Lửa Gần Rơm Lâu Ngày Cũng Bén)	2021	Non-album single
"Sweet Summer" (Căn Gác Mùa Hè)	2022	Citopia
"After All" (Năm Ngoái Giờ Này)	2022	Citopia
"Secret Sunday" (Quý Cô Say Xỉn)	2022	Citopia
"Hôm Nay Tôi Buồn" (The 5th Anniversary)	2023	Non-album single
"Wish You Hell" (Ước Anh Tan Nát Con Tim)	2024	Among Ten Thousand
"Love May Die But I Will Not" (Em Đau) (with Thành Luke)	2025	Among Ten Thousand
"Idontwannaseeyouanymore" (Khóc Blóck)	2025	Among Ten Thousand
"Midnight Conversations" (Tâm Sự Với Đêm Một Mình)	2025	Among Ten Thousand
"Spotify 2025 Wrapped Live"	2025	Non-album single
"Pretend" (Giả Vờ)	2026	Among Ten Thousand (Extended Edition)

==== As featured artist ====
Name	Year	Album
"Thôi Anh Không Làm Thêm Đâu Babi" (Haisam featuring Phùng Khánh Linh)	2024	Non-album single
"Thì Vui Biết Mấy" (The Flob featuring Phùng Khánh Linh)	2025	Tối Thượng
"Thành Phố Phía Đông" (Vương Bình featuring Phùng Khánh Linh)	2026	Anh Bờ Vai (Deluxe Edition)

==== Collaborations ====
Name	Year	Album
"Cánh Diều Chiều Mưa" (with Thu Phương and Kimmese)	2015	Vé Về Tuổi Thơ
"Như Hoa Mùa Xuân" (with Wren Evans)	2023	Gala Nhạc Việt: GreaTET - Thập Kỷ Nhạc Xuân
"Xúc Cảm Bộ Máy" (with Cá Hồi Hoang)	2023	Non-album single
"Đắp Chăn Bông" (with nae & de'lay)	2025	Non-album single
"Đủ Nắng Hoa Sẽ Nở" (with Văn Mai Hương and (S)TRONG)	2025	WeChoice Awards 2025

==== Soundtrack appearances ====
Name	Year	Album
"Hãy Bảo Nắng Về Đi" (Note: Also appears in The Early Recordings.)	2017	The Girl From Yesterday (Original Motion Picture Soundtrack)
"Muốn Ở Nhà"	2018	Please Don't Marry My Mom (Original Motion Picture Soundtrack)
"Mới Đây Thôi"	2018	Please Don't Marry My Mom (Original Motion Picture Soundtrack)
"Mai Này... (Em Sẽ Nấu Cơm)" (Note: Also appears in The Early Recordings as "Mai Này".) (featuring Han)	2019	Ngốc Ơi Tuổi 17 (Original Motion Picture Soundtrack)
"Một Bản Tình Ca 6/8"	2020	Stage of Love The Series (Original Motion Picture Soundtrack)
"Cảm Ơn Người Đã Thức Cùng Tôi"	2026	A Little Dream of Me (Original Motion Picture Soundtrack)

==== Promotional singles ====
Name	Year	Album
"Thầm Yêu"	2020	7 Deep Cuts Session
"Ước Một Ngày"	2020	7 Deep Cuts Session
"Những Ngày Thật Khác"	2020	7 Deep Cuts Session
"Chiếc Lá Vô Tình"	2020	7 Deep Cuts Session
"Pack My Things and Leave" (Gói Tình Em Rồi Về)	2020	Yesteryear
"Why Can't You?" (Sao Anh Không Hiểu?)	2020	Yesteryear

== Videography ==
=== Music videos ===
Music videos of Phùng Khánh Linh
Title	Date	Director(s)	Ref.
"Cánh Diều Chiều Mưa" (with Thu Phương & Kimmese)	July 19, 2015	—N/a	
"Lời Hứa Ngày Chia Tay"	April 27, 2017	—N/a	
"Hôm Nay Tôi Buồn"	February 1, 2018	—N/a	
"Trên Ô Cửa Máy Bay"	June 6, 2018	—N/a	
"Thành Phố Xa Lạ"	December 13, 2018	Đức Huy Nguyễn	
"Em Về Trời"	April 18, 2019	Tus	
"Cảm Ơn Vì Đã Lắng Nghe"	May 22, 2019	Tus	
"Liệu Anh Có Nghe"	September 29, 2019	My Hồ	
"Thầm Yêu"	April 14, 2020	My Hồ	
"Ước Một Ngày"	April 28, 2020	My Hồ	
"Những Ngày Thật Khác"	May 12, 2020	My Hồ	
"Chiếc Lá Vô Tình"	June 1, 2020	My Hồ	
"Tình Yêu Ở Lại"	June 6, 2020	My Hồ	
"World Without You" (Thế Giới Không Anh)	July 31, 2020	Đinh Hà Uyên Thư	
"He Said She Said" (Cô Gái Nhân Ái) (Dance performance video)	December 3, 2020	Khoa Anh Ho	
"Dance In the City" (Chỉ Còn Lại Hai Ta)	January 6, 2021	Ngạc Lâm Vũ	
"mpg" (Birthday's version) (with Sergey Nedzvetskiy)	May 7, 2021	Phùng Khánh Linh	
"One Blue Day" (Chỉ Buồn Hôm Nay)	June 18, 2021	Quốc Phong; Fearless87	
"No Strings Attached" (Lửa Gần Rơm Lâu Ngày Cũng Bén) (with 39 Kingdom)	December 28, 2021	Hồ Việt Quân	
"Sweet Summer" (Căn Gác Mùa Hè)	August 30, 2022	Hồ Việt Quân	
"Secret Sunday" (Cô Gái Say Xỉn)	November 18, 2022	Hồ Việt Quân	
"Bye Bye" (Ngưu Tầm Ngưu Mã Tầm Mã) (Stage performance video)	December 9, 2022	Hồ Việt Quân	
"Love May Die But I Will Not" (Em Đau) (with Thành Luke)	January 3, 2025	Hồ Việt Quân; Uin	

=== Promotional videos ===
Promotional videos of Phùng Khánh Linh
Title	Date	Director(s)	Ref.
"Why Can't You?" (Sao Anh Không Hiểu?)	November 5, 2020	Hồ Việt Quân	(Note: Phùng Khánh Linh did not participate in the video.)
"Don't Flirt" (Đừng Thả Thính) (Dance practice)	December 9, 2020	—N/a	
"Lonely" (Cô Đơn Sớm Tối)	August 20, 2021	Quốc Phong	

=== Guest appearances ===
Videos casting Phùng Khánh Linh as a guest appearance
Title	Date	Director(s)	Ref.
"Nhả Vía" (Kiều Anh featuring Pháo)	March 11, 2026	Jason	

=== Lyric videos ===
==== Directoral lyric videos ====
Directoral lyric videos of Phùng Khánh Linh
Title	Date	Director(s)/Editor(s)	Ref.
"Thành Phố Xa Lạ" (Lazy version)	March 29, 2019	—N/a	
"Chocolate"	February 13, 2020	—N/a	
"Letter #100" (Lá Thư 100)	January 30, 2021	—N/a	
"Fading Flower" (Hoa Tiêu Dao)	March 14, 2021	—N/a	
"In the Mood For Love" (Yêu Hết Tấm Thân Này) (with Josh Frigo)	July 17, 2021	Fearless87; Lê Minh	
"Love Confusion" (Anh Đã Không Rõ Ràng Với Em) (with MYRNE)	July 28, 2021	Fearless87; Lê Minh	
"Yesterme" (Em Của Ngày Hôm Qua)	July 30, 2021	Lê Minh	
"Digital Medicine" (Một Liều Thuốc)	August 06, 2021	Fearless87; Lê Minh	
"Cảm Ơn Người Đã Thức Cùng Tôi" (A Little Dream of Me OST)	February 14, 2026	—N/a	

==== Animated lyric videos ====
Animated lyric videos of Phùng Khánh Linh
Title	Date	Animator(s)	Ref.
"Pack My Things and Leave" (Gói Tình Em Rồi Về)	October 23, 2020	Nguyễn Hồng Vỹ	
"After All" (Năm Ngoái Giờ Này)	October 10, 2022	Nguyễn Anh Nhân (Note: also credited as anhnhxn_.)	
"Words of Wind" (Nói Lời Có Giữ Lời)	November 16, 2022	Nguyễn Anh Nhân	
"Summer 1994" (Mùa Hè Năm 1994)	November 17, 2022	Nguyễn Anh Nhân	
"Mystic Moonlight" (Đằng Sau Sân Khấu)	November 17, 2022	Nguyễn Anh Nhân	
"Sentimental Saigon" (Sài Gòn Ôm Lấy Em)	November 18, 2022	Nguyễn Anh Nhân	
"Day Dreamer" (Em Chỉ Tạm Đi Vắng Khi Anh Thức Giấc)	November 21, 2022	Nguyễn Anh Nhân	
"Cry Cry" (1 2 3 4 Tí Tách)	November 22, 2022	Nguyễn Anh Nhân	
"Xúc Cảm Bộ Máy" (Cá Hồi Hoang with Phùng Khánh Linh)	July 28, 2023	Lộc; Bum	
"Grief Is the Price You Pay For Love (Swan Song)"	October 18, 2025	Quang Long	
"Truth Hurts" (Hiện Thực Phũ Phàng)	October 18, 2025	Quang Long	
"Checkmate" (Cờ Người)	October 18, 2025	Quang Long	
"Ghosting" (Anh Là Thằng Tồi)	October 18, 2025	Quang Long	
"Gut Feeling" (Linh Cảm)	October 18, 2025	Quang Long	
"Obsessed" (Ám Ảnh Về Anh)	October 18, 2025	Quang Long	
"Wish You Hell" (Ước Anh Tan Nát Con Tim)	October 18, 2025	Quang Long	
"The Last Thing I Wanted" (Điều Em Không Muốn)	October 18, 2025	Quang Long	
"Man Up" (Hãy Nói Anh Sai Rồi)	October 18, 2025	Quang Long	
"Idontwannaseeyouanymore" (Khóc Blóck)	October 18, 2025	Quang Long	
"Midnight Conversations" (Tâm Sự Với Đêm Một Mình)	October 18, 2025	Quang Long	
"Love May Die But I Will Not" (Em Đau) (with Thành Luke)	October 18, 2025	Quang Long	
"Thì Vui Biết Mấy" (The Flob featuring Phùng Khánh Linh)	December 4, 2025	TIDU	
"Đắp Chăn Bông" (nae & de'lay with Phùng Khánh Linh)	December 10, 2025	Tú Minh	
"Thành Phố Phía Đông" (Vương Bình with Phùng Khánh Linh)	January 11, 2026	Nguyễn Anh Nhân	
"Đủ Nắng Hoa Sẽ Nở" (with Văn Mai Hương and (S)TRONG)	February 02, 2026	01A Collective	
"Pretend" (Giả Vờ)	March 18, 2026	Quang Long	

=== Visualisers ===
Visualisers of Phùng Khánh Linh
Title	Date	Director(s)/Editor(s)	Ref.
"Look At Me Now" (Nhìn Em Mà Xem)	September 2, 2021	Nguyễn Anh Nhân	
"Wish You Hell" (Ước Anh Tan Nát Con Tim)	September 6, 2024	Uin	
"Midnight Conversations" (Tâm Sự Với Đêm Một Mình)	August 9, 2025	Uin	

=== Documentaries ===
Phùng Khánh Linh Documentaries
Title	Date	Type	Details	Ref.
The Journey Into Yesteryear	December 5, 2020	Album documentary	Premiered on YouTube; A three-minute recap following Phùng Khánh Linh into her recording process of Yesteryear, including excerpts from choreography practices, album photoshoot and behind the scenes footages.	
Off The Record Vlog Series	March 27, 2025 to October 10, 2025	Tour & album documentary	Premiered on YouTube; No. of Episodes: 7; An hour-long footage featuring Phùng Khánh Linh before and during her promotional tour Off The Record.	

== Awards and nominations ==
Year	Award	Category	Nominee/work	Result	Reference
2018	Green Wave Awards (21st)	Best New Artist	Phùng Khánh Linh	Nominated	
2019	Dedication Music Awards (14th)	New Artist of the Year	Phùng Khánh Linh	Nominated	
2019	Dedication Music Awards (14th)	Song of the Year	"Hôm Nay Tôi Buồn"	Nominated	
2021	Dedication Music Awards (14th)	Album of the Year (16th)	Yesteryear	Nominated	
2021	Dedication Music Awards (14th)	Songwriter of the Year (16th)	Phùng Khánh Linh	Nominated	
2021	Mai Vàng Awards	Favorite Ballad Artist	Phùng Khánh Linh	Nominated	
2023	Dedication Music Awards (17th)	Female Artist of the Year	Phùng Khánh Linh	Nominated	
2023	Dedication Music Awards (17th)	Album of the Year	Citopia	Nominated	
2023	Dedication Music Awards (17th)	Songwriter of the Year	Phùng Khánh Linh	Nominated	
2025	Green Wave Awards (28th)	Top 10 Most Favorite Singer/Rapper	Phùng Khánh Linh	Nominated	
2025	Green Wave Awards (28th)	Album of the Year	Among Ten Thousand	Nominated	
2025	L'Officiel Beauty Choice Awards	Best Beauty Look in Music Product	"Wish You Hell"	Nominated	
2025	L'Officiel Beauty Choice Awards	Best Beauty Transformation - Female	Phùng Khánh Linh	Nominated	
2025	M-Merging Faces Awards	Rising Star of the Year - Female	Phùng Khánh Linh	Nominated	
2025	Ngoi Sao Xanh Awards	Best Music Video	"Love May Die But I Will Not"	Nominated	
2025	Ngoi Sao Xanh Awards	Fan Favorite Music Video	"Love May Die But I Will Not"	Nominated	
2025	Producer's Inside Picks & Awards	Female Artist of the Year	Phùng Khánh Linh	Nominated	
2025	Producer's Inside Picks & Awards	Album of the Year	Among Ten Thousand	Won	
2025	WeChoice Awards	Favorite Artist/Rapper	Phùng Khánh Linh	Nominated	
2026	Dedication Music Awards (20th)	Female Artist of the Year	Phùng Khánh Linh	Pending	
2026	Dedication Music Awards (20th)	Album of the Year	Among Ten Thousand	Pending	
2026	Dedication Music Awards (20th)	Songwriter of the Year	Phùng Khánh Linh	Pending	

=== Listicles ===
Name of publisher, name of listicle, year(s) listed, and placement result
Publisher	Listicle	Year(s)	Result	Ref.
Zing MP3	Popular Artist of the Year	2025	Placed	
Zing MP3	Viral Song of the Year	2025	Placed	
Zing MP3	Popular Album/EP of the Year	2025	Placed	
