= Myung =

Myung (Korean: 명), also spelled Myeong, Myong, or Myoung, is a Korean family name and a Korean given name.

== Family name ==
The surname Myung is derived from the Chinese surname Ming, written with the hanja 明, meaning "bright" or "brilliance". The 2000 South Korean census estimated that 26,746 people had this family name. In a study by the National Institute of the Korean Language based on 2007 application data for South Korean passports, it was found that 62.1% of people with this surname spelled it in Latin letters as Myung in their passports. The Revised Romanisation spelling Myeong was in second place at 18.9%, while another 16.2% used the spelling Myoung. Rarer alternative spellings (the remaining 2.8%) included Myeoung.

People with this family name include:

- Ming Yuzhen (1328–1366), Ming Xia Dynasty emperor, founder of several Myung clans
- Ming Sheng (born 1356), the second emperor of Ming Xia, founder of the Korean Myung clans
- Myoung Bok-hee (born 1979), South Korean handball player, Olympic silver medalist
- Myong Cha-hyon (born 1990), North Korean football player
- Myong Dong-chan (1948–1999), North Korean football player
- Myung Hyung-seo (born 2001), South Korean singer, member of CLASS:y
- Myung Jaehyun (born 2003), South Korean rapper and singer-songwriter, member of BoyNextDoor
- Myung Jae-nam (1939–1999), South Korean hapkido practitioner
- Myung Ji-yun (born 1975), South Korean actress
- John Myung (born 1967), American bassist, founder of Dream Theater
- John Myung, American accountant and poker player
- Myung Jun-jae (born 1994), South Korean football player
- Myung Kwang-sik (1940–2009), South Korean hapkido practitioner
- Myung Kyungjae (born 1968), South Korean biologist
- Myung Rye-hyun (born 1929), North Korean football manager
- Myung Se-bin (born 1975), South Korean actress
- Myung Tae-kyun (born 1970), South Korean businessman and journalist

== Given name ==
People with the given name Myung include:

- Yun Myŏng (fl. 15th century), Joseon Dynasty scholar-official

== See also ==
- List of Korean family names
- List of Korean given names
