= Ming (surname) =

Ming (明)
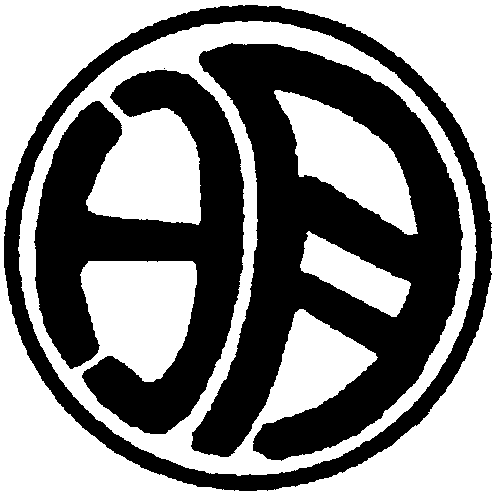
- Pronunciation: Míng (Mandarin)
- Language: Chinese

Origin
- Language: Old Chinese
- Meaning: "bright", "brilliance"

Other names
- Derivative: Myung/Myeong (Korean)

Ming is the Mandarin pinyin and Wade–Giles romanization of the Chinese surname written 明 in Chinese character. Ming is listed 111th in the Song dynasty classic text Hundred Family Surnames. It is not among the 300 most common surnames in China, according to a 2008 study. However, according to a 2013 study it was found to be the 249th most common, being shared by 340,000 people or .026% of the population, with the province with the most being Hubei.

Unrelated to the Chinese surname, Ming is also a surname in Switzerland, originating in the Canton of Obwalden.

== Notable people ==
=== Chinese ===
- Ming Chongyan (明崇俨; died 679), Tang dynasty official
- Ming Yuzhen (1331–1366), Yuan dynasty rebel leader, self-proclaimed Emperor of Xia
- Ming Sheng (明升; 1356–1391), son of Ming Yuzhen, exiled to Korea after Xia was conquered by the Ming dynasty
- Ming Ji (1923–2012), Taiwanese general and filmmaker
- Ming Jincheng (明金城), Taiwanese actor and director
- Ming Kai, better known as Clearlove, Chinese professional League of Legends player
- Ming Tian (born 1995), Chinese professional footballer

=== Other ===
- Hoyt Ming (1902–1985), American fiddler from Mississippi
- William Robert Ming, American civil rights lawyer

== See also ==
- Ming (given name)
- Emperor Ming, multiple persons
