= Quyền Văn Minh =

Vietnamese musician

Quyền Văn Minh (born July 11, 1954) is a Vietnamese jazz saxophonist. He is considered the first jazz star and one of the most eminent musicians in Hanoi. He is also known for running a jazz club in Old Quarter of Hanoi for years.

== Early life ==
Minh was born in Hanoi in a musical family. His father was a guitarist and saxophonist. His mother was a singer with good alto voice. When he was a teenager, he began to teach himself jazz saxophone after listening jazz on radio during the Vietnam War. At that time, the government kept culture under strict control. Minh's father did not support his son's interest in jazz until 1974, when he gave Minh an alto saxophone.
