= Liming =

Liming may refer to:

== Processes ==
- Liming (soil), the application of alkali to soil to neutralize soil acidity.
- Liming (leather processing), process where hides are soaked in an alkali solution to create parchment or leather
- The use of birdlime as a bird trap

== Places ==
- Liming New Village, Taichung, Taiwan
