= Li Ming (footballer, born 2000) =

Chinese footballer

Personal information
- Date of birth: 21 January 2000 (age 26)
- Place of birth: Qingdao, Shandong, China
- Height: 1.73 m (5 ft 8 in)
- Positions: Forward; midfielder

Youth career
- 2010: Qingdao Luyin
- 2011: Qingdao FC
- 2012–2013: Qingdao Jonoon
- 2013: Qingdao FA
- 2013–2018: Atlético Madrid
- 2017–2018: → Alcalá (loan)
- 2019–2021: Guangzhou City

Senior career*
Years	Team	Apps	(Gls)
2021–2022	Guangzhou City	0	(0)
2021	→ Sichuan Minzu (loan)	2	(0)
Total		2	(0)

International career
2013–2025	China U16		
- * Club domestic league appearances and goals

Li Ming (Chinese: 李明; born 21 January 2000), is a Chinese former footballer who played as a forward.

== Club career ==
Born in Qingdao, Shandong, Li started playing football as a child, joining his primary school football team at the age of ten, the same year he joined Qingdao Luyin. In 2011, his performances at the Mayor's Cup drew the attention of football fans throughout China, where he was described as "Maradonna-possessed" by a commentator, as well as earning the nickname "Qingdao little Messi", for his immense performances, scoring numerous goals and being noted for his dribbling ability. He was also recruited into the Qingdao team in the same year.

He once again garnered national attention the following year, this time for his performances at a primary school championship final, where he scored four goals and recorded one assist in a 5–2 victory.

In 2013, Li was selected for the Wanda Group's "China's Future Football Star" initiative, to encourage the development of young Chinese players. He joined the academy of Atlético Madrid, progressing through the youth ranks and representing the club at under-17 level. However, despite a promising start in Madrid, he was loaned to RSD Alcalá for the 2017–18 season, making eleven appearances for the under-19s.

He returned to China at the beginning of 2019, signing with Chinese Super League side Guangzhou City. He was loaned to China League Two club Sichuan Minzu in 2021, but only made two league appearances before returning to Guangzhou, where he was released at the end of the 2022 season.

== International career ==
At the age of thirteen, Geng received call-ups to both the under-14 and under-15 national teams. He was called up to the Chinese under-16 team in 2015.

== Personal life ==
Li is of Korean ethnicity.

== Career statistics ==
=== Club ===
Appearances and goals by club, season and competition
Club	Season	League			Cup		Other		Total	
Club	Season	Division	Apps	Goals	Apps	Goals	Apps	Goals	Apps	Goals
Guangzhou City	2021	Chinese Super League	0	0	0	0	0	0	0	0
Guangzhou City	2022	Chinese Super League	0	0	0	0	0	0	0	0
Guangzhou City	Total		0	0	0	0	0	0	0	0
Sichuan Minzu (loan)	2021	China League Two	2	0	1 (Note: Appearances in the Chinese FA Cup)	0	0	0	3	0
Career total			2	0	1	0	0	0	3	0
