= Thu Minh =

Vietnamese pop-singer

Vũ Thu Minh
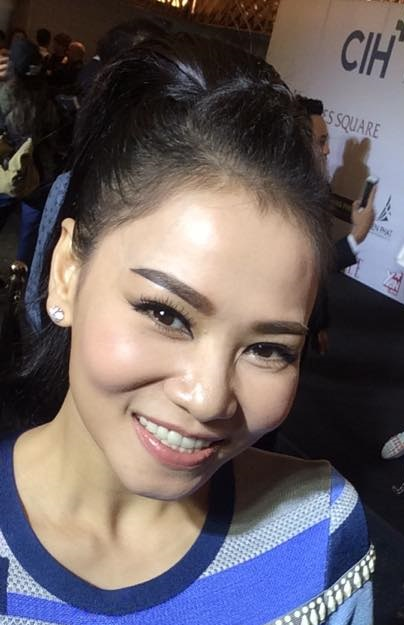
- Thu Minh

Background information
- Also known as: Thu Minh
- Born: Vũ Thu Minh; September 22, 1977 (age 49); Hanoi, Vietnam
- Origin: Hanoi
- Genres: Pop ballads, dance-pop, electronic
- Occupation: Singer
- Instrument: Vocals
- Years active: 1993–
- Label: TM Solutions (Thu Minh Solutions Company)
- Website: www.thuminh.com

Vũ Thu Minh (born September 22, 1977) also known simply as Thu Minh, is a Vietnamese pop-singer. She is referred to as the "Queen of Dance-pop in Vietnam" as well as "Vietnam's Celine Dion" and "the wind chime of Vietnamese music" due to her lyric soprano singing voice.

Originally trained to be a ballet dancer, Thu Minh became successful as a singer before attending and graduating from Berklee College of Music in Boston, at age 31. The biggest turning point in her musical career came with the success of the songs "Chuông gió" ("Wind chime"), "Bóng mây qua thềm", and "Nhớ anh" ("Missing you").

In 2011, Thu Minh won the Vietnamese Dancing with the Stars (on Vietnamese TV). In 2012 and 2017, she was one of judges on the reality show The Voice of Vietnam, where she coached Phạm Thị Hương Tràm and Ali Hoàng Dương to become the winners of the 1st and 4th seasons of the show, respectively.

== Career ==
=== Late 1980s: Career beginnings ===
At the age of 15, Thu Minh first learned of the contest on Broadcast of Ho Chi Minh when she saw it from a banner. She did not reveal her plan to enter the contest to her family and registered on her own. However, when she reached the final round, she was eliminated by the contest jury after they learned she was too young to qualify for the competition. With her family's support, she returned to the competition at the age of 16. Thu Minh was the youngest contestant, impressing audiences with two Vietnamese songs, "Bóng cây Kơ-nia" ("The Shadow of the Kapok Tree") and "Tình ca cho em" ("Love song for you"). She won a gold medal as the first prize.

Almost 20 years later, "Tình ca cho em" was revealed to be a song that its author, musician Nguyen Nam, wrote for Thu Minh specifically before she attended the contest.

=== 1990s – early 2000s: Diversity ===
Thu Minh's win did not immediately translate into widespread commercial success. She performed many classic songs, such as "Thousand purple revenue" by Hoang Trong, "The Shadow of the Kapok Tree" by Phan Huynh Dieu, "Giọt mưa thu" by Dang The Phong, "Thuyền viễn xứ" by Pham Duy, and "Thời hoa đỏ" ("The Red Flower") by Thanh Tung.

She has noted that she was proud of her career going "slowly, slowly but firmly". Her immediate goal was to earn enough money for building a private house for her parents and to provide her a regular income.

In 2000, Thu Minh sang a duet, "She's carefree", with musician Tran Tien, in his concert, Improvisative Tran Tien.

=== 2004–2008: Album Heaven ===
With musician Vo Thien Thanh, Thu Minh released her third album, Thiên đàng (Heaven) in 2004. Consisting of three CDs, this dance-oriented album was a breakthrough. Her strong voice stood out among other Vietnamese dance-pop singers, on Vietnamese songs like "Bóng mây qua thềm", "Chuông gió"("Wind chime") and "Ngày của tôi" ("My day") and English hits "All by Myself", "Queen of the Night", and "Tell Him." She also created new versions of classic songs such as "60 năm cuộc đời" ("60 years of life"); "Cho em một ngày thôi" ("'Give me one day only"), a duet with duo with Vietnamese singer Thanh Lam; "Hoa sữa" ("Milkwood pine"); and "Xích lô" ("Cyclo").

She always believed: "fame is not what makes me happiest, but artistic differences and uniqueness", thus, she sought to "cultivate and train herself for her own 'Thu Minh style', vocal technique and performance style". Thu Minh also genuinely said that the "frugal", "straight-forwarded, critical and perfectionism" in her music career, inherited from her mother, helped her bring the audience her best music performances.

=== 2009–present: Dance-pop and her rise to popularity ===
By this point in her career, Thu Minh focused her music on the dance-pop genre, releasing the album Ruby – Sixth Sense. In 2010, she released the demo single "Đường cong" ("The curve").

In 2011, Body Language (Ngôn ngữ cơ thể) featured Nguyen Hai Phong and Nathan Lee was called "rich, rhythmic, youthful," a "breath of fresh air and practical contribution to the development of dance-pop in Vietnam." The album was nominated in the Artist of the Year category.

Thu Minh returned to prominence in 2010 with and in 2011, a pure-dance album titled Body language was released. This album contained 11 dance-pop songs which Thu Minh coordinated with two young musicians. Her music videos showed a more sexually provocative and flirtatious personality. The songs all required a high and weighty female voice to hit high notes and a wide range of vocals, flexibility, and strong control over changing singing voices as well as belting out notes. With this, Thu Minh has now become "a leading pioneer" who has been involved in quality music recordings in dance-pop of Vietnam. The latest album which featured 11 Dance-pop songs sold extremely well. It was one of 2011's five best albums selected and voted on by a group of prestigious composers and music producers, and readers of Thao & Van Hoa (Sports & Culture) newspaper.

From then on, "sexiness is my brand" she claimed. Thus, her performance style on stage changed to be more appropriate with dance-pop yet she claimed that her personality in her private life is a different story and unchanged. This new style brought many controversial opinions from the public. Some viewers objected to the innovation in the style of her music, but some had sympathy and support for her breakthrough move which has brought about a colorful style and a pioneering creative thinking in music industry. About this change, she told in the program Leo & U of the YanTV channel that this change stemmed from her changing her former conservative attitudes about her music career. She now wanted to share and bring her music closer to public tastes to lead them. In this genre, with seasoned experience and her powerful soprano C vocal, she is actually a pioneer in style of dance-pop music through her professional, powerful, technical, and emotional vocals and techniques. Despite being unhappy with the changes, the majority of audiences still highly value Thu Minh's career on her vocals and technical expertise.

The same year 2011, Thu Minh won a gold medal in the folk music category in the "ASEAN Golden Voice Festival 2010" competition with the performance of "Bóng cây Kơ-nia" and also won the prize of "Favourite Singer" in this competition.

Recently, on 12 November 2012, Thu Minh introduction demo of a single called "Love you only/ Yêu mình anh" on her Facebook. This song is the main soundtrack for movie "Cold Summer" which will be released in the late of 2012. Also, this is the first work in Vietnam of famous producer Dada, who have had long experience in producing movie soundtracks music for years in Singapore and the United States. The producer expressed a great impression with her voice and techniques so that he decided to change the entire structure and spirit of the song after two hours of draft recording.

Also, her album "Body Language" was received a mega mix by a famous producer/remixer/DJ named Robin Skouteris. This is a contribution for her music to be more visible to foreign audience as this video received national attention spreading-widely so that online news from other countries like India stated that she is "one of superstar of Vietnam and one of the best vocalist of Vietnam in many many genre"

On 24 November 2012, Thu Minh participated in Korean global concert M-Live MO.A (Most Amazing) in Vietnam to celebrate 20 years of relations between Korea and Vietnam. She shared her thoughts on it saying, "Korea is the place of the ′Miracle of Hangang′, which affected its industries, economy and technology, so its determination to develop its cultural industry also is very high compared to other countries. Only such cultural exchanges like MO.A for the 20th anniversary of ties between the countries will help them become true 20-year friends". In this concert, she performed her new single "Love you only/ Yêu mình anh" and her big hits from her album, Body Language, in the Mega-mix version by Robin Skouteris both for the first time on stage. The first song got impressive and enormous compliments on her extremely powerful high notes from the local and international audiences. Controversially, the Mega-mix part had sound technical problems that made her voice from micro a bit smaller and weaker than that of the first performance that was realised by live audiences and the press at the back or up stage. Thu Minh was upset because it was not as good as her expectation without blaming on anyone and refusing to talk more on this, yet as a singer of a firm stuff, she managed well on stage, performed at her best with enthusiasm and 'burned' the whole stage for it. The Vietnamese audience was excessively shouting out her name and singing along during her performances. Her performances still brought a true pride for Vietnam after Van Mai Huong's not outstanding performance as one of the two Vietnamese representatives in MO.A.

In 2012, she also covered iconic ballads of Whitney Houston and Celine Dion, including "I Will Always Love You" and "All by Myself"

=== Other appearances on media ===
In addition to singing, Thu Minh also participated in dancing and acting. In 2005, Thu Minh received an invitation for the role, named "Ai", in the series Tinh yeu con mai from its film director. Her character was a strong-willed woman who is poor and undergoes multiple jobs to survive, which suits Thu Minh's personality the most as the director mentioned as his reason to invite her.

In 2008, Thu Minh portraited one role of the soap opera named Lan and Diep on stage and received a warm welcome from the audiences.

In 2010–11, in spite of the failure of the series Anh chang vuot thoi gian resulting from a poor plot, the press highlighted that while all other experienced actors and actresses (Huynh Anh Tuan, Kim Hien, Hua Vi Van, Thuy Huong, Don Nguyen) were insulted for solely acting and reading quotes without emotions, Thu Minh – a singer-to-be-temporary-actress – was praised to be the only one being persuasive in her acting role.

At the end of 2011, Thu Minh also won first prize "Queen of Dancesport" in a Dancing with the Stars competition. Her Rumba and Freestyle routines were credited for her victory; they recorded the two highest scores in the show's history and were praised by the former dancesport couple Khanh Thi and Chi Anh. Thu Minh's dancing was praised for its beauty and technical accomplishments. Although she was considered to have an advantage due to her previous training in ballet, Thu Minh thought differently. She said what had been assumed as her strength was actually her weaknesses because ballet and dancesport are technically opposite in leg movements and standing poses, making her a beginner. This marks her first successful attempt and diversifying from a singing career.

Thu Minh declared that she considers dancesport as "lovers, still in love but could not see it again because of a fear for love blossoming". After Dancing With the Stars in 2011, Thu Minh had been "feeling the miss of its abrupt ending for a long time". It is said that Thu Minh led many of her fans and colleagues to respect and feel an empathy for her artistic performance and drastic efforts in each of her artistic fields, the Northern-originated singer has always been committed into a challenge and attempting to play her best in any role. Judge Khanh Thi mentioned Thu Minh as a hard-working candidate who was the only contestant not showing many "trifling skill" to put a cover on error routines like other candidates but attempting to show skillful techniques of dancesport. She mainly focused and boldly tried to imitate routines and style of a 'real' professional dancer throughout the competition.

In 2012, she became one of four judges for the The Voice of Vietnam.

On January 14, 2013,Thu Minh determined that she needed to take some time off to take care of her family. She also confirmed that she would officially leave as coach the next season. However, she should still be available in an advisory role for the immediate future. Thu Minh will have returned to bench coach for the following season.

== Personal life ==
Thu Minh was born on September 22, 1977, in Hanoi, and lives in Ho Chi Minh City.

Her father, Vu Ngoc Kim, and mother, along with her elder brother and his family live in Ho Chi Minh City, while her sister is married and lives in the U.S.

Thu Minh had a first love which lasted more than eight years with musician Hoai Sa. They met and went together after mutual performances on stage when Thu Minh was (only 17-year-old) a new 'toddler' entering into music industry while Hoai Sa was playing the piano for his band. Artists, at that time, used to say they were like a golden couple. Thu Minh has frankly admitted that she fell in love with her second love before separating with Hoai Sa and that this is immoral behavior when disrespecting and hurting her first love. But it also helped her to not repeat her mistakes later in life. Hoai Sa admitted after three years of separation, he realised the reason Thu Minh left him was due to his "carefree", and "unstable" lifestyle. Hoai Sa also gave a praise to say Thu Minh is "foresighted, smart, successful" but "dignified and serious in [love] selection" and a woman that "only the most sincere man will win".

She married Dutch businessman Otto de Jager in 2012.

== Awards ==
- 1993: First prize − Tieng hat truyen hinh National Singing Competition
- 2003: Top 10 − Lan song xanh Award – for "Missing you"
- 2006: Best Song of the Month − Bai hat Viet Award – for "Wind chime"
- 2006: Best Song of the Year − Bai hat Viet Award – for Wind chime
- 2007: Best Album of the Year − Gold Album Award – for Emerald – Heaven
- 2011: Favorite Singer − ASEAN Golden Voice Festival Award
- 2011: Silver Prize in Pop − ASEAN Golden Voice Festival Award – for "I Have Nothing"
- 2011: Gold Prize in Folk − ASEAN Golden Voice Festival Award – for "The Shadow of Kapok Tree"
- 2011: First Prize − Dancing with the Stars (Vietnamese TV series) (season 2, Vietnam) – duo with Lachezar Todorov
- 2013: 15th Mnet Asian Music Awards – Best Asian Artist: Vietnam

== Discography ==
1. Vol.1 Dreams (2001)
2. Vol.2 Last quote (2003)
3. Vol.3 What if (2004)
4. Vol.4 My love (2005)
5. Heaven − Emerald (2006)
6. I Do − Pearl (2008)
7. 6th Sense − Ruby (2010)
8. Body Language (2011)
9. Single Love you only/ Yêu mình anh (2012)

== Tours and live shows ==
- 2004: Friendship Melody Concert
- 2006: Liveshow "Heaven"
- 2009: Em Dep Nhat Dem Nay (You Are Most Beautiful Tonight) Music Gala
- 2009: Van Son 48
- 2009: Diva's night 1 and 2 (My Le live show)
- Jan 2012: The 19th Duyen Dang Viet Nam (Charming Vietnam)
- 2012: So phan (Destiny) (Dam Vinh Hung liveshow)
- Jun–Jul, Sept 2012: Sea Show
- 24 Nov 2012: K-Pop Global Concert MO.A (Most Amazing) − 20th Korea−Vietnam relations celebration
- 5–6 Dec 2012: Red Revolution in Hanoi
- 8 Dec 2012: Am nhac va Buoc nhay thang 12; Mobilefone event at Nha hat Hoa Binh
- 15 Dec 2012: Mobilefone event (duo with My Tam and Uyen Linh)
- 19–20 Dec 2012: Red Revolution in Ho Chi Minh City
- 20 Dec 2012: Lan Song Xanh 15 years celebration (duo with Hong Nhung)

== Filmography ==
- 2005: Tinh yeu con mai, as Ms. Ai
- 2008: Lan and Diep soap opera, as Ms. Thuy Lieu
- 2011: Anh chang vuot thoi gian, as Highest Imperial Consort "Le Lieu"
