= Zhou =

Zhou may refer to:

== Chinese history ==
- Predynastic Zhou (周 or 先周; c. 1150–c. 1046 BC), the state in modern Shaanxi which established the Zhou dynasty
- Zhou dynasty (周朝; c. 1046–256 BC), a dynasty of China controlling Shaanxi, the North China Plain, and its periphery
  - Western Zhou (西周; c. 1046–771 BC), ruling from present-day Xi'an
  - Eastern Zhou (東周; 770–256 BC), overseeing numerous petty states from present-day Luoyang
- Zhou (Duke of Zhou's state) (周邑 or 周国; c. 1046–after 580 BC), located in Zhoucheng (present-day Fengxiang District), the fief granted to Duke of Zhou's younger son Duke Ping of Zhou and his descendants, lasting at least until 580 BC under Chu
- Western Zhou (state) (西周; 440–256 BC), one of the Warring States in modern western Henan
- Eastern Zhou (state) (東周; 367–249 BC), one of the Warring States in modern eastern Henan
- Northern Zhou (北周; 557–581), a Xianbei state ruling western China from present-day Xi'an during the Northern and Southern Dynasties
- Wu Zhou (武周; 690–705), a brief interregnum of the Tang dynasty, ruling from present-day Luoyang
- Later Zhou (後周; 951–960), briefly ruling most of northern China from Kaifeng during the Five Dynasties and Ten Kingdoms period
- Zhou (Zhang Shicheng) (大周; 1354–1357), a state founded by Zhang Shicheng during the Red Turban Rebellion at the end of the Yuan dynasty
- Great Zhou (大周; 1678–1681), a state founded by Wu Sangui during the Qing dynasty

== People ==
- King Zhou of Shang (商紂王; c. 1105–1046 BC), the last king of the Shang dynasty
- Zhou (surname) (周), a common Chinese surname, also romanized as Chou
- Chen Yao, a DOTA player who goes by the screenname Zhou
- Zhou Enlai, first Premier of China|Premier of the People's Republic of China
- Zhou Guanyu, an ex-Formula One Driver.

== Other uses ==
- Chinese Zhou-class nuclear submarine, a type of nuclear-powered vessel
- Zhou (administrative division) (州), a traditional East Asian administrative division
- Congee, various rice porridges known in Chinese as zhōu (粥)
- Beta Serpentis, a binary star system with the primary component now given the proper name Zhou

== See also ==
- Chou (disambiguation)
