= Emperor Ming =

Emperor Ming may refer to:

- Emperors of the Ming Dynasty
- Emperor Ming of Han (28-75)
- Emperor Ming of Wei (205-239), see Cao Rui
- Emperor Ming of Zhao (274 - 333), see Shi Le
- Emperor Ming of Jin (299 - 325)
- Emperor Ming of Song (439 - 472)
- Emperor Ming of Southern Qi (452 - 498)
- Emperor Ming of Northern Zhou (534 - 560)
- Emperor Ming of Western Liang (542–585)
- Emperor Xuanzong of Tang (685 - 762), sometimes referred to as Emperor Ming
- Ming the Merciless, a fictional character in the Flash Gordon stories
