= Zhou Ming (athlete) =

Chinese long jumper

Personal information
- Born: 7 January 1970 (age 56)

Sport
- Sport: Athletics
- Event: Long jump
Medal record
Representing China
East Asian Games
Bronze medal – third place	1993 Shanghai	Long jump

Zhou Ming (born 7 January 1970) is a retired Chinese athlete who specialised in the long jump. He represented his country at the 1993 World Indoor Championships in Toronto finishing seventh.

His personal bests in the event are 8.12 metres outdoors (Changsha 1992) and 7.88 metres indoors (Toronto 1993).

== Competition record ==
Year	Competition	Venue	Position	Notes
Representing China
1988	Asian Junior Championships	Singapore	2nd	7.68 m
1991	Summer Universiade	Sheffield, United Kingdom	4th	7.91 m
1993	World Indoor Championships	Toronto, Canada	7th	7.84 m
1993	East Asian Games	Shanghai, China	3rd	7.84 m
