= Dancing with the Stars Vietnam =

Vietnamese television series

- Logo from 2013 onwards
- Genre: Reality television
- Developed by: BBC
- Presented by: Thanh Bạch (2010-2011); Thanh Vân (2010, 2012); Đoan Trang (2011); Nguyên Vũ (2012); Lương Mạnh Hải (2013-); Đông Nhi (2013-)
- Starring: see below
- Judges: Khánh Thi; Chí Anh (2010-2012); Nguyễn Quang Dũng (2010-2011); Lê Hoàng (2010, 2013-); Đức Huy (2011); Trần Tiến (2011); Quốc Bảo (2012); Hồ Hoài Anh (2012); Trần Ly Ly (2013-)
- Country of origin: Vietnam
- Original language: Vietnamese
- No. of seasons: 8

Production
- Executive producer: Lại Văn Sâm
- Camera setup: multi-camera
- Running time: 90-120 min.
- Production companies: Cát Tiên Sa Production; BBC Worldwide (licensor)

Original release
- Network: VTV3
- Release: April 11, 2010 – present

Related
- Dancing Stars; Strictly Come Dancing; Dancing with the Stars

Bước nhảy hoàn vũ (lit. 'Universal Steps') is a reality show produced by Vietnam Television and Cát Tiên Sa Production. The show is based on the British reality TV competition Strictly Come Dancing and is a part of the Dancing with the Stars franchise. The first season aired from April 11 to June 20, 2010, with 8 pairs of celebrities and professional dancers. The show returned for its second season on April 17, 2011, and the third season on mid March, 2012.

The current panel of judges consists of Khánh Thi, Lê Hoàng and Trần Ly Ly, leaving Khánh Thi is the only original judge until this season. Lê Hoàng made a comeback after two seasons breaking. Former permanent judges were Chí Anh (from 2010 to 2012), Nguyễn Quang Dũng (2010 and 2011), Trần Tiến and Đức Huy (2011), Quốc Bảo and Hồ Hoài Anh (2012). Trần Ly Ly and Nguyễn Việt Tú were frequently special guest judges. Later, Trần Ly Ly was promoted to permanent judge in 2013 season.

== Format ==
Former logo of Bước nhảy hoàn vũ in 2010

Former logo of Bước nhảy hoàn vũ in 2011-2012

The contestant pairs consist of a celebrity paired with a professional dancer. Past celebrity contestants include frequently supermodels, actors, dramatic actors, singers, and comedians. Each couple performs predetermined dances and competes against the others for judges' points and audience votes which carry equal weight. The couple receiving the lowest combined total of judges' points and audience votes is eliminated each week until only the champion dance pair remains. The celebrity will then be crowned The Dancing King/Queen.

The show is broadcast live every Sunday primetime on VTV3 and get the encore later on local channels and VTV4 - Channel for the oversea and foreigners / VTV6 - Channel for Youth as well. It is presented by Thanh Bạch and Thanh Vân, then from season 2 onwards Đoan Trang took Thanh Vân's place due to her pregnancy. The judging panel initially consisted of Khánh Thi, Chí Anh, Lê Hoàng and Nguyễn Quang Dũng. By the end of the first season/the beginning of second season, Quang Dũng had left the show and Lê Hoàng had confirmed to return but they didn't. Lê Hoàng stated to leave for Cặp đôi hoàn hảo. They all were replaced by Đức Huy and Trần Tiến in season 2. Under pressure from public critics, Trần Tiến with his stunts decided to quit after four-week judging and the producers got Quang Dũng back on the panel from the fifth week. In season 3, Thanh Vân got back her role on the show, meanwhile Thanh Bạch & Đoan Trang both left. Judges Đức Huy and Nguyễn Quang Dũng did not return, they are replaced by Quốc Bảo and a fourth guest judge each week.

The main singers on the show are Tiêu Châu Như Quỳnh, Hồ Trung Dũng, Lê Kim Ngân, Tuyết Mai, and Dương Ánh Linh. Since its beginning Trung Dũng, Như Quỳnh, Khánh Linh have been parts. Joining them later are Kim Ngân and Tuyết Mai. Nguyễn Ngọc Phương Trinh, Xuân Phú, Thảo Xuân, Mr. A and duets Khánh Dung & Nguyên Lộc appeared several times as replacements.

Judging panel

| Judge | Seasons | | | | | | |
| Judge | 1 | 2^{1} | | 3^{2} | | 4 | 5 |
|---|---|---|---|---|---|---|---|
| Khánh Thi | ♦ | ♦ | ♦ | ♦ | ♦ | ♦ | ♦ |
| Trần Ly Ly | ▬ | ▬ | ▬ | ▬ | ▬ | ♦ | ♦ |
| Chí Anh | ♦ | ♦ | ♦ | ♦ | ♦ | ▬ | ▬ |
| Lê Hoàng | ♦ | ▬ | ▬ | ▬ | ▬ | ♦ | ▬ |
| Nguyễn Quang Dũng | ♦ | ▬ | ♦ | ▬ | ▬ | ▬ | ▬ |
| Đức Huy | ▬ | ♦ | ♦ | ▬ | ▬ | ▬ | ▬ |
| Trần Tiến | ▬ | ♦ | ▬ | ▬ | ▬ | ▬ | ▬ |
| Quốc Bảo | ▬ | ▬ | ▬ | ♦ | ▬ | ▬ | ▬ |
| Hồ Hoài Anh | ▬ | ▬ | ▬ | ▬ | ♦ | ▬ | ▬ |

Current
Former
Fourth guest judge

^1 Trần Tiến was a permanent judge from Week 1 through 3; Nguyễn Quang Dũng revived his role from Week 4.
^2 Quốc Bảo left the show after six weeks judging; Hồ Hoài Anh was his replacement.

Hosts

| Host | Seasons | | | | |
| Host | 1 | 2 | 3 | 4 | 5 |
|---|---|---|---|---|---|
| Nguyên Khang | ▬ | ▬ | ▬ | ▬ | ♦ |
| Yến Trang | ▬ | ▬ | ▬ | ▬ | ♦ |
| Thanh Bạch | ♦ | ♦ | ▬ | ▬ | ▬ |
| Thanh Vân | ♦ | ▬ | ♦ | ▬ | ▬ |
| Đoan Trang | ▬ | ♦ | ▬ | ▬ | ▬ |
| Nguyên Vũ | ▬ | ▬ | ♦ | ▬ | ▬ |
| Lương Mạnh Hải | ▬ | ▬ | ▬ | ♦ | ▬ |
| Đông Nhi | ▬ | ▬ | ▬ | ♦ | ▬ |

Current
Former
Guest host
Previously a participant

== Main series results ==
| Season | Premiere date | Finale date | Winning couple | Runner-up couple | Third place couple | Other contestants (in order of elimination) | Number of couples |
|---|---|---|---|---|---|---|---|
| 1 | April 11, 2010 | June 20, 2010 | Ngô Thanh Vân & Tihomir Gavrilov | Cao Thị Đoan Trang & Evgeni Popov | Siu Black & Ivan Spasov | Vũ Hoàng Điệp, Ngô Tiến Đoàn, Lương Mạnh Hải, Trần Quang Vinh, Hồng Quang Minh (a.k.a. Minh Béo) | 8 |
| 2 | April 17, 2011 | June 3, 2011 | Vũ Thu Minh & Lachezar Todorov | Trần Thị Thủy Tiên & Petyo Stoyanov | Lê Nguyên Vũ & Petya Dimitrova | Hứa Vĩ Văn, Nguyễn Thị Kim Hiền, Trần Huy Khánh, Vũ Thu Phương, Bùi Đại Nghĩa, Lê Thị Thanh Thúy, Phạm Anh Khoa | 10 |
| 3 | March 18, 2012 | June 17, 2012 | Lê Ngọc Minh Hằng & Atanas Georgiev Malamov | Trương Nam Thành & Elena Hristova Hadzihristova | Nguyễn Thị Anh Thư & Teodor Mitkov Zlatarev | Phạm Huỳnh Đông, Vũ Thị Hoàng My, Quách Ngọc Ngoan, Trịnh Minh Quân, Bùi Thị Phương Thanh, Nguyễn Ngọc Thùy Trang (a.k.a. Vân Trang), Phan Tuấn Tú | 10 |
| 4 | March 23, 2013 | May 25, 2013 | Nguyễn Yến Trang & Tihomir Gavrilov | Ngô Kiến Huy (a.k.a. Lê Thành Dương) & Victoria Gencheva | Nguyễn Lan Phương & Valeri Ivanov | Trương Ngọc Tình, Trương Thế Vinh (a.k.a. Nguyễn Xuân Vinh), Maya (a.k.a. Mai Thu Hường), Nguyễn Hòa Hiệp, Nguyễn Hoài Bảo Anh, Hồ Vĩnh Khoa, Huỳnh Khương Ngọc Quyên | 10 |
| 5 | January 11, 2014 | March 23, 2014 | Thu Thủy & Daniel and Ngân Khánh & Kristian * | | Phạm Thị Thanh Vân (a.ka. Ốc Thanh Vân) & Atanas Malamov | Phan Thanh Bình, Huỳnh Thảo Trang, Bùi Minh Hoàng (a.k.a. Hoàng Mập), Nguyễn Trà My (a.k.a. Trà My Idol), Đỗ Hữu Long, Trần Nguyên Cát Vũ (a.k.a. Tim), Vũ Phạm Diễm My (a.k.a. Diễm My 9X) | |
| 6 | January 3, 2015 | April 14, 2015 | Ninh Dương Lan Ngọc & Daniel Denev | Lê Ngọc Phương Trinh (a.k.a. Angela Phương Trinh) & Kristian Yordanov | Nguyễn Thùy Chi (a.k.a. Chi Pu) & Georgi Naydenov | Sử Duy Vương, Nguyễn Hữu Quốc Vinh (a.k.a. Dumbo), Vương Khang, Nguyễn Hương Giang (a.k.a. Hương Giang Idol), Diệp Lâm Anh | |
| 7 | January 30, 2016 | April 16, 2016 | Nguyễn Cao Sơn Thạch (a.k.a. S.T Sơn Thạch) | Nguyễn Thị Nhàn (a.k.a. Khánh My) | Phạm Vũ Phượng Hoàng (a.k.a. Jennifer Phạm) | Nguyễn Văn Thuận (a.k.a. Thuận Nguyễn), Nguyễn Thùy Trang (a.k.a. Trang Pháp), Vũ Ngọc Anh, Trần Minh Trung, Lâm Khánh Chi (a.k.a. Huỳnh Phương Khanh), Trần Thị Diệu Nhi, Trần Thị Kim Ngân (a.k.a. Khả Ngân), Quách Mai Ly Tapiau (a.k.a. MLee), Trịnh Hồng Quế | |

=== Season 1: 2010 ===
April 11 to June 20, 2010, in order of elimination:

| Celebrity | Professional | Result |
|---|---|---|
| Vũ Hoàng Điệp | Nicolay Georgiev Nikolaev | Week 2 |
| Ngô Tiến Đoàn | Paige Alexis Inman | Week 3 |
| Lương Mạnh Hải | Anna Nikolaeva Sidova | Week 4 |
| Trần Quang Vinh | Valeriya Nikolaeva Nikolova | Week 5 |
| Hồng Quang Minh (a.k.a. Minh Béo) | LiLi Boyanova Velichkova | Week 6 |
| Siu Black-Nguyễn Hữu Phước | Ivan Kirilov Spasov | Week 7 (Third place) |
| Cao Thị Đoan Trang | Evgeni Lyubomirov Popov | Runner-up |
| Ngô Thanh Vân | Tihomir Romanov Gavrilov | Winner |

=== Season 2: 2011 ===
April 17 to June 3, 2011, in order of elimination:

| Celebrity | Professional | Result |
|---|---|---|
| Hứa Vĩ Văn | Anna Nikolaeva Sidova | Week 3 |
| Nguyễn Thị Kim Hiền | Daniel Nikolov Denev | Week 4 |
| Trần Huy Khánh | Tsveta Krasimirova Tsocheva | Week 5 |
| Vũ Thu Phương | Tihomir Romanov Gavrilov | Week 6 |
| Bùi Đại Nghĩa | Valeriya Nikolaeva Bozukova | Week 7 |
| Lê Thị Thanh Thúy | Aleksandar Iliev Vachev | Week 8 |
| Phạm Anh Khoa | Iva Ludmilova Grigorova | Week 9 |
| Lê Nguyên Vũ-Vũ Bạch Nhật | Petya Bozhidarova Dimitrova | Week 10 (Third place) |
| Trần Thị Thủy Tiên | Petyo Dimitrov Stoyanov | Runner-up |
| Vũ Thu Minh | Lachezar Stefanov Todorov | Winner |

=== Season 3: 2012 ===
March 18 to June 17, 2012, in order of elimination

| Celebrity | Professional | Result |
|---|---|---|
| Vũ Thị Hoàng My | Hristo Ivanov Grachki | Week 3 |
| Phan Tuấn Tú | Vesela Kostadinova Nedyalkova | Week 4 |
| Quách Ngọc Ngoan | Vesela Georgieva Dimova | Week 5 |
| Phạm Huỳnh Đông | Rusina Boncheva Stefanova | Week 6 |
| Nguyễn Ngọc Thùy Trang (a.k.a. Vân Trang) | Vasil Stoyanov Yovchev | Week 7 |
| Trịnh Minh Quân-Nguyễn Trọng Việt | Nikoleta Ilkova Petrova | Week 8 |
| Bùi Thị Phương Thanh | Ivan Nedyalkov Raykov | Week 9 |
| Nguyễn Thị Anh Thư | Teodor Mitkov Zlatarev | Week 10 (Third place) |
| Trương Nam Thành | Elena Hristova Hadzihristova | Runner-up |
| Lê Ngọc Minh Hằng | Atanas Georgiev Malamov | Winner |

=== Season 4: 2013 ===
March 23 to May 25, 2013, in order of elimination

| Celebrity | Professional | Result |
|---|---|---|
| Trương Ngọc Tình | Mihaela Pavlova | Week 3 |
| Nguyễn Xuân Vinh (a.k.a. Trương Thế Vinh) | Ina Chokova | Week 4 |
| Mai Thu Hường (a.k.a. Maya) | Kristian Yordanov | Week 5 |
| Nguyễn Hòa Hiệp | Vesela Midova | Week 6 |
| Nguyễn Hoài Bảo Anh | Atanas Malamov | Week 7 |
| Hồ Vĩnh Khoa | Anna Nikolaeva Sidova | Week 8 |
| Huỳnh Khương Ngọc Quyên | Daniel Denev | Week 9 |
| Nguyễn Lan Phương | Valeri Ivanov | Week 10 (Third place) |
| Lê Thành Dương (a.k.a. Ngô Kiến Huy) | Victoria Gencheva | Runner-up |
| Nguyễn Yến Trang | Tihomir Gavrilov | Winner |

=== Season 5: 2014 ===
January 11

=== Season 6: 2015 ===
January 3

=== Season 7: 2016 ===
Trang Pháp, S.T Sơn Thạch, Jennifer Phạm will participate.

=== Season 8: 2024 ===
In August 2024, VTV announced the return of Bước nhảy hoàn vũ after an 8-year hiatus. This season will be the first time featuring Korean contestants alongside Vietnamese contestants and Bulgarian dancers.

In addition, this season features an "alternative celebrity" rule: At any stage of the season, if a celebrity is deemed unable to continue due to health problems, they will walk away from the season and an alternate celebrity will stand in their place to continue the competition.

== Professional dancers and their partners ==
| Professional | Season 1 | Season 2 | Season 3 | Season 4 | Season 5 |
|---|---|---|---|---|---|
| Aleksandar Vachev | | Thanh Thúy | CHOREOGRAPHER | | |
| Anna Nikolaeva Sidova | Lương Mạnh Hải | Hứa Vĩ Văn | | Hồ Vĩnh Khoa | |
| Atanas Malamov | | | Minh Hằng | Bảo Anh | Thanh Vân |
| Daniel Denev | | Kim Hiền | | Ngọc Quyên | Thu Thuỷ |
| Elena Hadzihristova | | | Trương Nam Thành | | |
| Evgeni Popov | Đoan Trang | | | | |
| Hristo Grachki | | | Vũ Thị Hoàng My | | |
| Iva Grigorova | | Phạm Anh Khoa | | | |
| Ivan Raykov | | | Phương Thanh | | |
| Ivan Spasov | Siu Black | | | | |
| Ina Chokova | | | | Trương Thế Vinh | |
| Kristian Yordanov | | | | Maya | Ngân Khánh |
| Lachezar Todorov | | Thu Minh | | | |
| LiLi Velichkova | Minh Béo | | | | |
| Mihaela Pavlova | | | | Ngọc Tình | |
| Nicolay Nikolaev | Vũ Hoàng Điệp | | | | |
| Nikoleta Petrova | | | Minh Quân | | |
| Paige Inman | Tiến Đoàn | | | | |
| Petya Dimitrova | | Nguyên Vũ | | | |
| Petyo Stoyanov | | Thủy Tiên | | | |
| Rusina Stefanova | | | Huỳnh Đông | | |
| Teodor Zlatarev | | | Anh Thư | | |
| Tihomir Gavrilov | Ngô Thanh Vân | Vũ Thu Phương | | Yến Trang | |
| Tsveta Tsocheva | | Huy Khánh | | | |
| Valeri Ivanov | | | | Lan Phương | |
| Valeriya Bozukova | | Đại Nghĩa | | | |
| Valeriya Nikolova | Quang Vinh | | | | |
| Vasil Yovchev | | | Vân Trang | | |
| Vesela Dimova | | | Quách Ngọc Ngoan | Hòa Hiệp | |
| Vesela Nedyalkova | | | Tuấn Tú | | |
| Victoria Gencheva | | | | Ngô Kiến Huy | |
| Kosta Karakashyan | | | | | Diễm My |

Key:

Male professional
Female professional
Winner of the season
Runner-up of the season
Third place of the season
Last place of the season
Withdrew in the season

== Statistics ==
As of the end of season two Ngô Thanh Vân & Tihomir Gavrilov and Cao Thị Đoan Trang & Evgeni Popov, both from the first season hold the record for most perfect scores with two perfect 40 out of 40.

The lowest that the judges have ever awarded was 26/40 to Vũ Hoàng Điệp & Nicolay Nikolaev for their Waltz.

The most tens record goes to Ngô Thanh Vân & Tihomir Gavrilov and Cao Thị Đoan Trang & Evgeni Popov coincidentally. They tie at 27 tens, meanwhile the second season winning couple Vũ Thu Minh & Lachezar Todorov only gets 15 ones. For the best average score from judges to all contestants, Ngô Thanh Vân & Tihomir Gavrilov currently come first on top of the all-time board being 37.5/40 for their dances, followed by Vũ Thu Minh & Lachezar Todorov (36.7/40), Cao Thị Đoan Trang & Evgeni Popov (36.5/40).

=== Highest and lowest scoring performances ===
| Dance | Couple | Highest score | Couple | Lowest score |
|---|---|---|---|---|
| Argentine Tango (season 1 & 4) | Ngọc Quyên & Daniel Denev | 38 | Hồ Vĩnh Khoa & Anna Nikolaeva Sidova | 33 |
| Cha Cha Cha | Siu Black & Ivan Spasov | 38 | Cao Thị Đoan Trang & Evgeni Popov | 28.5 |
| Foxtrot | Cao Thị Đoan Trang & Evgeni Popov | 40 | Lương Mạnh Hải & Anna Nikolaeva Sidova | 30 |
| Freestyle | Ngô Thanh Vân & Tihomir Gavrilov; Trần Thị Thủy Tiên & Petyo Stoyanov; Lan Phương & Valeri Ivanov | 40 | Hứa Vĩ Văn & Anna Nikolaeva Sidova | 29 |
| Jive | Lê Thị Thanh Thúy & Aleksandar Vachev; Phạm Anh Khoa & Iva Grigorova; Ngô Kiến Huy & Victoria Gencheva | 38 | Vũ Thu Phương & Tihomir Gavrilov; Bảo Anh & Atanas Malamov; Ngọc Tình & Mihaela Pavlova | 31 |
| Paso Doble | Trương Nam Thành & Elena Hristova Hadzihristova | 40 | Bảo Anh & Atanas Malamov | 32 |
| Quickstep | Vũ Thu Minh & Lachezar Todorov | 38 | Ngô Tiến Đoàn & Paige Inman | 30 |
| Rumba | Ngô Thanh Vân & Tihomir Gavrilov; Vũ Thu Minh & Lachezar Todorov | 40 | Vũ Hoàng Điệp & Nicolay Nikolaev | 28 |
| Samba | Cao Thị Đoan Trang & Evgeni Popov | 40 | Ngọc Tình & Mihaela Pavlova | 29.3 |
| Tango | Ngô Thanh Vân & Tihomir Gavrilov | 39 | Trần Quang Vinh; Phạm Anh Khoa & Iva Grigorova | 30 |
| Viennese Waltz^{a} (season 1) | Cao Thị Đoan Trang & Evgeni Popov | 35 | N/A | N/A |
| Waltz | Cao Thị Đoan Trang & Evgeni Popov | 39 | Vũ Hoàng Điệp & Nicolay Nikolaev | 26 |

- ^Note aThe routines were not applied for scoring. During the season 1 finale, Đoan Trang & Evgeni chose it as their favorite and got scored. So did Ngô Thanh Vân & Tihomir.

=== Champions' Ranks ===
| Rank | Celebrity | Professional Partner | Season | Average score |
|---|---|---|---|---|
| 1 | Ngô Thanh Vân | Tihomir Gavrilov | 1 | 37.50 |
| 2 | Minh Hằng | Atanas Malamov | 3 | 36.82 |
| 3 | Thu Minh | Lachezar Todorov | 2 | 36.73 |
| 4 | Yến Trang | Tihomir Gavrilov | 4 | 35.88 |

=== Runners-up' Ranks ===
| Rank | Celebrity | Professional Partner | Season | Average score |
|---|---|---|---|---|
| 1 | Nam Thành | Elena Hadzihristova | 3 | 36.64 |
| 2 | Đoan Trang | Evgeni Popov | 1 | 36.46 |
| 3 | Ngô Kiến Huy | Victoria Gencheva | 4 | 35.28 |
| 4 | Thủy Tiên | Petyo Stoyanov | 2 | 35.00 |

=== Third Place Ranks ===
| Rank | Celebrity | Professional Partner | Season | Average score |
|---|---|---|---|---|
| 1 | Lan Phương | Valeri Ivanov | 4 | 35.98 |
| 2 | Siu Black | Ivan Spasov | 1 | 35.80 |
| 3 | Nguyên Vũ | Petya Dimitrova | 2 | 35.55 |
| 4 | Anh Thư | Teodor Zlatarev | 3 | 34.82 |

== Controversies ==
=== Unfair scores ===
In season 2 the case of Anh Khoa and Iva, all four judges gathered for quick break for discussion about giving scores unlike independently as usual.

And to all seasons, judges are harshly criticized for giving generous scores very sentimentally based upon the case that contestants or partners' sickness, family's bad luck, not so serious injury and so on. That discriminates much against participants who have devoted their really faithful performances based upon hardworking rehearsal and upon creativity. Season 1 winner Ngô Thanh Vân showed disagreement that she would quit because of scoring unfairness. Season 2 finalist Thủy Tiên expressed her feeling of wrong critics and bad scores.

=== Phone voting/Textgate ===
In June 2011, the show hit the headlines when viewers were able to register telephone votes for a couple that effectively they could not save from the dance off irrespective of how many public votes were cast in their favour. Some voters claimed that they couldn't send messages voting for Anh Khoa & Iva eliminated the same week during textgate open, when received confirmatory text "Vui lòng nhắn tin bình chọn sau khi các thí sinh đã tham gia xong phần thi của mình. Xin chân thành cảm ơn" (literally: "Text after all performances done. Thank you for voting"). It is not clear if the "Thank you for voting" messages were incorrectly assigned, as if the replies were incorrectly assigned, votes would have been counted for the correct contestant despite the voters receiving the wrong "thank you" messages. No message responded even 7 hours after texting was affirmed as well.

All involved including the broadcaster, producers and textgate owner informed no errors during week 9 (June 26) in public press. They also revealed the out of phase of the text-gate with live audience which meant people could only text formally from 30 seconds up to a minute in normal mode after the announcement of hosts and clearly voting could be continued during short time when the gate was deemed closed.

=== Cast members ===
Many celebrity are claimed the involving in the show like Phan Anh, Ngọc Tình and Vĩnh Thụy of season 2 step by step replacing. Moreover, Vĩnh Thụy reservedly or unreservedly quit regarding on the accusation of smuggling from Australia to Vietnam by air and the lawsuit filed against him.

=== Timing violation ===
Every performance should be performed in 1.5 minutes according to standard practices in almost all versions Dancing with the Stars and in international competitions. On June 6, 2011, the length of Thu Minh's performance was deemed the longest and the shortest performance was that of Đại Nghĩa with only 1 minute 40 seconds. Once again on June 26 and in the finale of season 2(July 3), Thu Minh & Lacho had additional performances.

=== Striptease ===
Tendency of undressing on stage was up gradually, beginning in the first week and accumulating in the finale. It is more focused on the "tease" in "striptease" than the "strip". These actions are considered over-sexy, seductive and influence the culture in a bad manner.

=== Winner crowning ===
With 79 [with judges] and the percentage of votes is 46.02, scores 4 [in total]... the runner-up is Thủy Tiên

— said Đoan Trang

There was much discussion in the communication industry about the real season two winner because there was confusion over the crowning. Initially, Đoan Trang revealed the runner-up, thus the other was the winner. Trang announced 79 scored by the runner-up. Moments that turned Thủy Tiên (who obviously scored 77) to the edge of glory and turned Thu Minh (who truly scored 79 out of possible 80) slightly blue was quickly stopped with the real name "Thủy Tiên", leading everyone got shocked.

Under too much pressure, producers finally agreed to make a press conference in free will to give info about textgate in order to clarify everything. Mistakes of mis-crowning was caused by result paper as interpreted.

=== Mimicking ===
On June 5, Thu Minh wowed the judging panel with her exotic dance concept that brought her two 10s for Samba. Later, it was revealed that the choreography and wardrobe she wore looked amazingly similar to those of Max Kozhevnikov and Yulia Zagoruychenko in the World Super Stars Dance Festival in 2006. In sudden press reports earlier in the week, two main judges Khánh Thi and Chí Anh stated "mimicking is actually self mastering, is the creativity of Thu Minh and Lachezar". Producers tried to help Thu Minh, claiming it was not Thu Minh's fault, that the wardrobe was made from our set of designers' ideas and gave no comment about the choreography.

=== Producers' rigging ===
Jury carried half weight of the total score, the other half weight by audience's messages... and we don't know who classified these messages... Producers revealed how much, we only knew right that much... Finally, everything is just simply in the script.

— Lương Hoàng Anh, Huy Khánh's ex-housewife said after his elimination

Reportedly by various newspaper, producers rigged the show. Participants were eliminated as audience thought in an elimination order written in the screenplay. Lương Hoàng Anh, who was Huy Khánh's ex-wife, used Facebook note for raising a tension with the producers after he was out of the race. She also reported Khánh had said to their kid to watch his elimination on Bước nhảy hoàn vũ on Sunday night prior to his elimination actually occurred. Producers denied these claims as baseless, stating that there was officially a company collecting and analyzing messages, and the results were not to be revealed by producers alone without VTV's permission.

== Dance styles for seasons ==
| Style | Seasons |
|---|---|
| Argentine Tango | 1 |
| Broadway | 3 |
| Cha-cha-cha | 1, 2, 3 |
| Exhibition/Group dance | 1, 2 |
| Folk music | 1, 2 |
| Foxtrot | 1, 2, 3 |
| Freestyle | 1, 2, 3 |
| Jive | 1, 2, 3 |
| Mambo | 3 |
| Music from movies | 3 |
| Pasodoble | 1, 2, 3 |
| Quickstep | 1, 2, 3 |
| Rumba | 1, 2, 3 |
| Salsa | 3 |
| Samba | 1, 2, 3 |
| Tango | 1, 2, 3 |
| Viennese Waltz | 1, 2, 3 |
| Waltz | 1, 2, 3 |

== See also ==
- Dancing Stars (Bulgarian TV series)
- Strictly Come Dancing
- Dancing with the Stars (American TV series)
- Dancing with the Stars - versions of the show produced in other countries
- Cặp đôi hoàn hảo - the corresponding format in Vietnamese, with singing instead of dancing
