= Dancing with the Stars Vietnam season 1 =

Dancing with the Stars Vietnam
- Season 1
- Starring: see below
- No. of episodes: 8 (As of 20 June 2010)

Release
- Original network: VTV3
- Original release: April 11 – June 20, 2010

Bước nhảy hoàn vũ 2010 is a reality show produced by Vietnam Television and Cát Tiên Sa Production. The show originates from the BBC series Strictly Come Dancing and is a part of the international Dancing with the Stars franchise. The first season was set to air from April 11 to June 20, 2010 with 8 pairs of celebrities and professional dancers. The first elimination might take place on April 18.

Thanh Bạch and Thanh Vân were announced to host the show. The judging panel will include director Nguyễn Quang Dũng, Lê Hoàng, and the leading Vietnamese dancesport athletes Khánh Thi and Chí Anh.

Ngô Thanh Vân and Tihomir Gavrilove were declared the winners.

== Couples ==
Celebrity	Occupation	Professional Partner	Dancer Number	Status
Vũ Hoàng Điệp	Model/Miss Queen Tourism International 2009	Nicolay Georgiev "Nicky" Nikolaev	06	Eliminated 1st on April 18, 2010
Ngô Tiến Đoàn	Model/Mister International 2008	Paige Alexis Inman	07	Eliminated 2nd on April 25, 2010
Lương Mạnh Hải	Actor	Anna Nikolaeva Silova	03	Eliminated 3rd on May 9, 2010
Trần Quang Vinh	Recording artist	Valeriya Nikolaeva Nikolova	08	Eliminated 4th on May 23, 2010
Hồng Quang Minh	Comedian & Actor	LiLi Boyanova Velichkova	04	Eliminated 5th on May 30, 2010
Siu Black	Entertainer & Vietnam Idol's Judge	Ivan Kirilov Spasov	02	Third place on June 13, 2010
Cao Thị Đoan Trang	Recording artist	Evgeni Lyubomirov Popov	01	Second place on June 20, 2010
Ngô Thanh Vân	Singer, Actress & Former Model	Tihomir Romanov "Tisho" Gavrilov	05	Winners on June 20, 2010

== Scoring chart ==
Couples	Place	1	2	3	4	5	6	7	8
Thanh Vân & Tisho	1	36	37	37	35	39	37+38=75	39+40=79	35+37+40=112
Đoan Trang & Evgeni	2	28.5	34	37	40	40	33+39=72	39+38=77	35+39+35=109
Siu Black & Ivan	3	34.2	34	36	39	39	32+36=68	34+38=72	
Minh Béo & Lili	4	30	29	36	33	31	33+32=65		
Quang Vinh & Valeria	5	29	31	30	37	33			
Mạnh Hải & Anna	6	31	31	34	30				
Tiến Đoàn & Paige	7	31	30	33					
Hoàng Điệp & Nicky	8	26	28						

Red numbers indicate the lowest score for each week
Green numbers indicate the highest score for each week
Underlined numbers indicate the favourite contestant of the week
indicates the winning couple.
indicates the runner-up couple.
indicates the third-place couple.
The couple finished is in the bottom two
indicates the couple eliminated that week.

Notes:

- Week 1: Ngô Thanh Vân scores the best for her first step (Cha-Cha-Cha) with four 9s; other four notable celebrities who are also praised for a 9 includes Siu Black, Lương Mạnh Hải, Ngô Tiến Đoàn và Quang Vinh.
- Week 2: Once again, Thanh Vân & Tisho becomes the best couples of the night with two 10s in spite of the fact that she was previously injured. After receiving criticisms and marks from the judging panel, she suddenly collapses and needs some medical checkup. On the contrary, couples of Minh Béo and of Hoàng Điệp land into the bottom due to weak skills and Hoàng Điệp & Nicky are eliminated. Notable performances: Siu Black & Ivan (they also gains two 10s), Đoan Trang & Evgeni, Quang Vinh & Valeriya.
- Week 3: Siu Black & Ngô Thanh Vân get difficulties at the beginning of the week, for Siu Black is her son's accident and for Thanh Vân is her injury from the previous week. At the competition, couple of Đoan Trang and of Ngô Thanh Vân wow the judges by their strong move, enthusiasm, generosity and even sweetness; they each gain two 10s and become the strongests. Quang Vinh's scores the worst, but does not land to the bottom. As the result, couple of Tiến Đoàn & Paige are eliminated although they get the same final score as Mạnh Hải & Anna.
- Week 4: This week features Pasodoble and Slow Foxtrot. Most of the couples those perform Pasodoble are praised meanwhile those perform Foxtrot seem ill. The first Pasodoble performance by Siu Black & Ivan explodes the stage with 39 points in total. Lately, Đoan Trang & Evgeni appear with Slow Foxtrot step, completely satisfy all and they gain four perfect 10s. At the end, couple of Anna & Mạnh Hải is eliminated due to the lowest scores by judges and by audience.
- Week 5: Prior to the beginning, Ngô Thanh Vân desired to quit due to unsatisfy with the judging, but it did not happen. She is back to the competition and scores well together with Đoan Trang and Siu Black. The bottom consists of Minh Béo & Lili and Quang Vinh & Valeria, then the latter is eliminated because they do not improve much.

== Highest and lowest scoring performances ==
The best and worst performances in each dance according to the judges' marks are as follows:

Dance	Best dancer(s)	Highest score	Worst dancer(s)	Lowest score
Argentine Tango				
Cha Cha Cha				
Freestyle				
Foxtrot				
Jive				
Mambo				
Paso Doble				
Quickstep				
Rumba				
Salsa				
Samba				
Tango				
Viennese Waltz				
Waltz				

== Couples' highest and lowest scoring dances ==
Couples	Highest Scoring Dances	Lowest Scoring Dances
Ngô Thanh Vân & Tisho	Rumba & Freestyle (40)	Foxtrot & Argentine Tango (35)
Đoan Trang & Evgeni	Foxtrot & Samba (40)	Cha-Cha-Cha (28.5)
Siu Black & Ivan	Pasodoble & Samba (39)	Foxtrot (32)
Minh Béo & Lili	Tango (36)	Rumba (29)
Quang Vinh & Valeria	Pasodoble (37)	Waltz (29)
Mạnh Hải & Anna	Jive (34)	Foxtrot (30)
Tiến Đoàn & Paige	Jive (33)	Quickstep (30)
Hoàng Điệp & Nicky	Rumba (28)	Waltz (26)

== Dance schedule ==
- Week 1: Standard Waltz & Cha-Cha-Cha
- Week 2: Quickstep & Rumba
- Week 3: Jive & Tango
- Week 4: Slow Foxtrot & Paso Doble
- Week 5: Viennese Waltz & Samba
- Week 6: Two unlearned dances from the previous weeks
- Week 7: Two unlearned dances from the previous weeks
- Week 8: Favorite dances/Freestyle

== Songs ==
=== Week 1 ===
Air date: April 11
Location: Phan Đình Phùng Gymnasium
Styles: Cha Cha Cha & Waltz
Singers: Tiêu Châu Như Quỳnh, Ánh Linh & Hồ Trung Dũng
Special guest(s): Đức Tuấn

Individual judges scores in charts below (given in parentheses) are listed in this order from left to right: Director Lê Hoàng – Khánh Thi- Director Nguyễn Quang Dũng – Chí Anh. The results of the voting is combined with the ranking of the panel of judges, and the celebrities have the higher scores in total are survive.

Performing order

Couple	Jury		Audience		Total (1:1)	Style	Music
Couple	Score	#	Vote (%)	#	Total (1:1)	Style	Music
Đoan Trang & Evgeni	28.5 (7–8.5–7–6)	2	8.59	5	7	Cha Cha Cha	"Let's Get Loud" —- Jennifer Lopez
Siu Black & Ivan	34.2 (9–8.7–8.5–8)	7	7.49	2	9	Waltz	"You Light Up My Life" —- Debby Boone
Mạnh Hải & Anna	31 (7–9–8–7)	6	4.19	1	7	Cha Cha Cha	"Save the Last Dance for Me" —- The Drifters
Minh Béo & LiLi	30 (7–7–8–8)	4	8.11	3	7	Waltz	"Love Is A Hunger" —- Curtis Stigers
Thanh Vân & Tisho	36 (9–9–9–9)	8	40.88	8	16	Cha Cha Cha	"Chilly Cha Cha" —- Jessica Jay
Hoàng Điệp & Nicky	26 (7–6–6–7)	1	11.78	7	8	Waltz	"When You Believe" —- Mariah Carey & Whitney Houston
Tiến Đoàn & Paige	31 (7–8–7–9)	6	8.37	4	10	Cha Cha Cha	"Dancing in September" —- Earth, Wind & Fire
Quang Vinh & Valeria	29 (6–9–7–7)	3	10.59	6	9	Waltz	"See the Day" —- Dee C. Lee

=== Week 2 ===
Air date: April 18
Location: Phan Đình Phùng Gymnasium
Styles: Quickstep & Rumba
Singers: Tiêu Châu Như Quỳnh, Ánh Linh & Hồ Trung Dũng
Special guest(s): Hà Anh Tuấn

Individual judges scores in charts below (given in parentheses) are listed in this order from left to right: Director Lê Hoàng – Khánh Thi- Director Nguyễn Quang Dũng – Chí Anh. The results of the voting is combined with the ranking of the panel of judges, and the celebrities have the higher scores in total are survive.

Performing order

Couple	Jury		Audience		Total (1:1)	Style	Music
Couple	Score	#	Vote (%)	#	Total (1:1)	Style	Music
Đoan Trang & Evgeni	34 (8–9–9–8)	7	6.60	6	13	Quickstep	"You Can't Hurry Love" —- The Supremes
Minh Béo & LiLi	29 (7–7–8–7)	2	5.49	5	7	Rumba	"You're Beautiful" —- James Blunt
Mạnh Hải & Anna	31 (8–8–9–6)	5	4.26	3	8	Quickstep	"Don't Get Me Wrong" —- The Pretenders
Quang Vinh & Valeria	31 (6–9–7–9)	5	5.07	4	9	Rumba	"Falling into You" —- Céline Dion
Tiến Đoàn & Paige	30 (7–7–7–9)	3	1.99	2	5	Quickstep	TBA
Hoàng Điệp & Nicky	28 (8–6–6–8)	1	1.57	1	2	Rumba	"Endless Love —- Diana Ross & Lionel Richie
Thanh Vân & Tisho	37 (8–10–9–10)	8	52.94	8	16	Quickstep	"Let's Face the Music and Dance" —- Natalie Cole
Siu Black & Ivan	34 (7–10–10–7)	7	22.06	7	14	Rumba	"California Dreamin'" —- The Mamas & the Papas

=== Week 3 ===
Air date: April 25
Location: Bà Rịa-Vũng Tàu Gymnasium
Styles: Jive & Tango
Singers: Tiêu Châu Như Quỳnh, Ánh Linh & Xuân Phú

Individual judges scores in charts below (given in parentheses) are listed in this order from left to right: Director Lê Hoàng – Khánh Thi- Director Nguyễn Quang Dũng – Chí Anh. The results of the voting is combined with the ranking of the panel of judges, and the celebrities have the higher scores in total are survive.

Performing order

Couple	Jury		Audience		Total (1:1)	Style	Music
Couple	Score	#	Vote (%)	#	Total (1:1)	Style	Music
Mạnh Hải & Anna	34 (8–9–9–8)	3	5.40	2	5	Jive	"Do You Love Me" —- The Contours
Quang Vinh & Valeria	30 (8–8–7–7)	1	9.07	4	5	Tango	"El Tango de Roxanne" —- from Moulin Rouge!
Đoan Trang & Evgeni	37 (8–10–10–9)	7	10.85	6	13	Jive	"La Bamba" —- from La Bamba
Minh Béo & LiLi	36 (9–9–9–9)	5	5.62	3	8	Tango	"GoldenEye" —- Tina Turner
Tiến Đoàn & Paige	33 (8–8–9–8)	2	1.65	1	3	Jive	"You Can't Stop the Beat" —- from Hairspray
Siu Black & Ivan	36 (8–10–9–9)	5	10.03	5	10	Tango	"Happy Together" —- The Turtles
Thanh Vân & Tisho	37 (10–9–8–10)	7	57.38	7	14	Jive	"Mambo No. 5" —- Pérez Prado

=== Week 4 ===
Air date: May 9
Location: Bà Rịa – Vũng Tàu Gymnasium
Styles: Foxtrot & Paso Doble
Singers: Phương Trinh, Hồ Trung Dũng & Ánh Linh
Special guest(s): Nguyễn Ngọc Anh

Individual judges scores in charts below (given in parentheses) are listed in this order from left to right: Director Lê Hoàng – Khánh Thi- Director Nguyễn Quang Dũng – Chí Anh. The results of the voting is combined with the ranking of the panel of judges, and the celebrities have the higher scores in total are survive.

Performing order

Couple	Jury		Audience		Total (1:1)	Style	Music
Couple	Score	#	Vote (%)	#	Total (1:1)	Style	Music
Ngô Thanh Vân & Tisho	35 (8–9–9–9)	3	19.18	5	8	Slow Foxtrot	"My Way" —- Frank Sinatra
Siu Black & Ivan	39 (9–10–10–10)	5	18.09	4	9	Pasodoble	"Rasputin" —- Boney M
Mạnh Hải & Anna	30 (7–8–8–7)	1	10.63	1	2	Slow Foxtrot	"Close to You" —- The Carpenters
Quang Vinh & Valeria	37 (9–9–9–10)	4	13.75	3	7	Pasodoble	"España cañí" —- Pascual Marquina Narro
Đoan Trang & Evgeni	40 (10–10–10–10)	6	25.85	6	12	Slow Foxtrot	"Fever" —- Peggy Lee
Minh Béo & LiLi	33 (8–9–7–9)	2	12.50	2	4	Pasodoble	"Spanish Guitar" —- Bo Diddley

=== Week 5 ===
Air date: May 23
Location: Nguyễn Du Gymnasium
Styles: Samba & Waltz Vienna
Singers: Tiêu Châu Như Quỳnh, Hồ Trung Dũng & Ánh Linh
Special guest(s): Nathan Lee, Hiền Thục

Individual judges scores in charts below (given in parentheses) are listed in this order from left to right: Director Lê Hoàng – Khánh Thi- Director Nguyễn Quang Dũng – Chí Anh. The results of the voting is combined with the ranking of the panel of judges, and the celebrities have the higher scores in total are survive.

Performing order

Couple	Jury		Audience		Total (1:1)	Style	Music
Couple	Score	#	Vote (%)	#	Total (1:1)	Style	Music
Minh Béo & LiLi	31 (7–8–8–8)	1	13.31	3	4	Samba	"Bailamos" —- Enrique Iglesias
Ngô Thanh Vân & Tisho	39 (9–10–10–10)	4	46.71	5	9	Samba	"Shake Your Bon-Bon" —- Ricky Martin
Siu Black & Ivan	39 (9–10–10–10)	4	12.49	2	6	Samba	"Ain't It Funny" —- Jennifer Lopez
Đoan Trang & Evgeni	40 (10–10–10–10)	5	17.57	4	9	Samba	"Whenever, Wherever" —- Shakira
Quang Vinh & Valeria	33 (7–9–9–8)	2	9.91	1	3	Samba	"Livin' la Vida Loca" —- Ricky Martin
Top 5 & the partners	Do not score					Viennese Waltz	"Delilah" —- Tom Jones

=== Week 6 ===
Air date: May 30
Location: Phan Đình Phùng Gymnasium
Styles: Two unlearned dances from the previous weeks
Singers: Thảo Xuân, Hồ Trung Dũng & Ánh Linh
Special guest(s): Lam Trường, Hồng Nhung

Individual judges scores in charts below (given in parentheses) are listed in this order from left to right: Director Lê Hoàng – Khánh Thi- Director Nguyễn Quang Dũng – Chí Anh. The results of the voting is combined with the ranking of the panel of judges, and the celebrities have the higher scores in total are survive.;

Performing order

Couple	Jury		Audience		Total (1:1)	Style	Music
Couple	Score	#	Vote (%)	#	Total (1:1)	Style	Music
Minh Béo & Lili	33 (8–8–8–9)	1	11.02	1	2	Quickstep	"In the Mood" —- Ernie Fields & His Orchestra
Minh Béo & Lili	32 (8–8–8–8)	1	11.02	1	2	Cha Cha Cha	"I Need to Know" —- Marc Anthony
Thanh Vân & Tisho	37 (9–9–9–10)	4	49.33	4	8	Waltz	"Open Arms" —- Journey
Thanh Vân & Tisho	38 (9–10–10–9)	4	49.33	4	8	Pasodoble	"España cañí" —- Pascual Marquina Narro
Đoan Trang & Evgeni	33 (8–9–8–8)	3	20.78	3	6	Tango	"La Cumparsita" —- Gerardo Matos Rodríguez
Đoan Trang & Evgeni	39 (10–10–10–9)	3	20.78	3	6	Rumba	"Ain't No Sunshine" —- Bill Withers
Siu Black & Ivan	32 (8–8–8–8)	2	18.87	2	4	Foxtrot	"Fly Me to the Moon" —- Frank Sinatra
Siu Black & Ivan	36 (9–9–9–9)	2	18.87	2	4	Jive	"Proud Mary" —- Ike & Tina Turner

=== Week 7 ===
Air date: June 13
Location: Nguyễn Du Gymnasium
Styles: The other two unlearned dances from the previous weeks
Singers: Tiêu Châu Như Quỳnh, Hồ Trung Dũng, Ánh Linh, Khánh Dung & Nguyên Lộc
Special guest(s): Mỹ Lệ

Individual judges scores in charts below (given in parentheses) are listed in this order from left to right: Director Lê Hoàng – Khánh Thi- Director Nguyễn Quang Dũng – Chí Anh. The results of the voting is combined with the ranking of the panel of judges, and the celebrities have the higher scores in total are survive.

Performing order

Couple	Jury		Audience		Total (1:1)	Style	Music
Couple	Score	#	Vote (%)	#	Total (1:1)	Style	Music
Thanh Vân & Tisho	39 (10–10–10–9)	3	18.07	1	4	Tango	"Jealousy" —- Billy Fury (Anna helps)
Thanh Vân & Tisho	40 (10–10–10–10)	3	18.07	1	4	Rumba	"Fields of Gold" —- Sting
Siu Black & Ivan	34 (8–9–9–8)	1	36.76	2	3	Quickstep	Spider-Man's theme song (Nicky & Paige help)
Siu Black & Ivan	38 (10–10–9–9)	1	36.76	2	3	Cha-Cha-Cha	"Lady Marmalade" —- Labelle
Đoan Trang & Evgeni	39 (9–10–10–10)	2	45.17	3	5	Waltz	"Lotus" —- Secret Garden
Đoan Trang & Evgeni	38 (9–10–10–9)	2	45.17	3	5	Paso Doble	Carmen

=== Week 8 ===
Air date: June 20
Location: Phan Đình Phùng Gymnasium
Styles: Freestyle & Favorite Dance of the Season
Singers: Tiêu Châu Như Quỳnh, Hồ Trung Dũng, Ánh Linh, Khánh Dung & Nguyên Lộc
Special guest(s): Hồ Quỳnh Hương, Đức Tuấn, Phương Thanh

Individual judges scores in charts below (given in parentheses) are listed in this order from left to right: Director Lê Hoàng – Khánh Thi-Director Nguyễn Quang Dũng – Chí Anh. The results of the voting is combined with the ranking of the panel of judges, and the celebrities have the higher scores in total are survive.

Performing order

Couple	Jury		Audience		Total (1:1)	Style	Music
Couple	Score	#	Vote (%)	#	Total (1:1)	Style	Music
Thanh Vân & Tisho	35 (9–9–9–8)	2	53.93%	2	4	Tango Argentina	"Whatever Lola Wants" —- from Whatever Lola Wants
Thanh Vân & Tisho	37 (10–9–9–9)	2	53.93%	2	4	Cha-Cha-Cha	"Pata Pata (Cha Cha)" —- Miriam Makeba
Thanh Vân & Tisho	40 (10–10–10–10)	2	53.93%	2	4	Freestyle	TBA
Đoan Trang & Evgeni	35 (8–10–9–8)	1	46.07%	1	2	Waltz	"Earth Song" —- Michael Jackson
Đoan Trang & Evgeni	39 (9–10–10–10)	1	46.07%	1	2	Samba	"Objection" —- Shakira
Đoan Trang & Evgeni	35 (9–9–9–8)	1	46.07%	1	2	Freestyle	"Chợ phiên (Rising Sun)" —- TBA

== Dance performed ==
Team	1	2	3	4	5		6		7		8		
Thanh Vân & Tisho	Cha-Cha-Cha	Quickstep	Jive	Foxtrot	Samba	Viennese Waltz	Waltz	Paso Doble	Tango	Rumba	Argentine Tango	Cha-Cha-Cha	Freestyle
Đoan Trang & Evgeni	Cha-Cha-Cha	Quickstep	Jive	Foxtrot	Samba	Viennese Waltz	Tango	Rumba	Waltz	Paso Doble	Viennese Waltz	Samba	Freestyle
Siu Black & Ivan	Waltz	Rumba	Tango	Paso Doble	Samba	Viennese Waltz	Foxtrot	Jive	Quickstep	Cha-Cha-Cha			
Minh Béo & LiLi	Waltz	Rumba	Tango	Paso Doble	Samba	Viennese Waltz	Quickstep	Cha-Cha-Cha					
Quang Vinh & Valeria	Waltz	Rumba	Tango	Paso Doble	Samba	Viennese Waltz							
Mạnh Hải & Anna	Cha-Cha-Cha	Quickstep	Jive	Foxtrot									
Tiến Đoàn & Paige	Cha-Cha-Cha	Quickstep	Jive										
Hoàng Điệp & Nicky	Waltz	Rumba											

Highest scoring dance
Lowest scoring dance

== Guest stars ==
Date	Performer(s)	Song(s)	Dancers
April 11, 2010	Đức Tuấn	"Can't Take My Eyes off You"	Đức Tuấn's dancers
April 11, 2010	[pre-recording]	"Love Story"	Tisho & Lili
April 11, 2010	[pre-recording]	"Time of My Life"	Ivan & Paige
April 18, 2010	Hà Anh Tuấn	"You Raise Me Up"	Hà Anh Tuấn's dancers
April 18, 2010	[pre-recording]	"España cañí"	Anna & Evgeni
April 18, 2010	[pre-recording]	"Mo' Horizons"	Nicky & Valeria
April 25, 2010	[pre-recording]	"Tango"	Ivan & Paige
April 25, 2010	Xuân Phú	"Love Story"	Nicky & Valeria
May 9, 2010	[pre-recording]	"Horchat Hai Caliptus"	Ivan & Paige, Tisho & LiLi
May 9, 2010	Nguyễn Ngọc Anh	"I Believe I Can Fly"	Thanh Bạch & Thanh Vân
May 9, 2010	[pre-recording]	"Everything I Can't Have"	The professional dancers
May 23, 2010	Nathan Lee	"She"	Nathan Lee's dancers
May 23, 2010	[pre-recording]	"Hey! Pachuco!"	Nicky & Valeria, Ivan & Paige
May 23, 2010	Hiền Thục	"Yêu dấu theo gió bay"	Hiền Thục's dancers
May 30, 2010	Lam Trường	"Quando, Quando, Quando"	Lam Trường's dancers
May 30, 2010	[pre-recording]	"Ain't That a Kick in the Head?"	Tisho & Anna, Evgeni & Lili
May 30, 2010	Hồng Nhung	"Don't Cry for Me, Argentina"	[none]
June 13, 2010	Mỹ Lệ	"Saving All My Love for You"	Mỹ Lệ's dancers
June 13, 2010	[pre-recording]	"Scarborough Fair"	Hương Giang & Tisho
June 13, 2010	Nguyên Lộc & Khánh Dung	"The Cup of Life"	Thanh Vân, Nicky, Ivan & Paige
June 13, 2010	Ánh Linh	"Perhaps, Perhaps, Perhaps"	Thanh Bạch & Anna
June 20, 2010	Hồ Quỳnh Hương	"To Love You More"	Hồ Quỳnh Hương's dancers
June 20, 2010	[pre-recording]	"Purest of Pain"	Đức Tuấn & Khánh Thi
June 20, 2010	Hồ Trung Dũng	"Love Potion No. 9"	Phương Thanh & Ivan
June 20, 2010	[pre-recording]	"Chicken Dance"	all
