= Farewell Summer (film) =

1992 film by Lê Hoàng Hoa

Farewell Summer Vĩnh biệt mùa hè
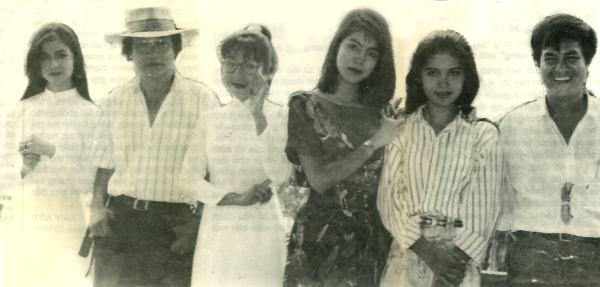
- Lê Hoàng Hoa, Nguyễn Đông Thức and four actresses of Farewell Summer in 1992.
- Directed by: Lê Hoàng Hoa
- Screenplay by: Lê Hoàng Hoa
- Based on: Novel Farewell Summer by Nguyễn Đông Thức
- Produced by: Duy Nghĩa; Đỗ Văn Thịnh
- Starring: Việt Trinh; Hồng Hạnh; Hương Giang; Bảo Hạnh; Lê Công Tuấn Anh; Lê Cung Bắc; Kim Xuân
- Cinematography: Nguyễn Hòe
- Edited by: Thủy Chung
- Music by: Thanh Tùng; Từ Huy; Nguyễn Ngọc Thiện
- Production company: Giaiphong Film Studio
- Distributed by: Giaiphong Film Studio; Young Film Studio
- Release date: 1992
- Running time: 99 minutes
- Country: Vietnam
- Language: Vietnamese

Farewell Summer (Vietnamese: Vĩnh biệt mùa hè) is a 1992 Vietnamese 35mm romance film adapted from Nguyễn Đông Thức's 1992 novel of the same name. The film was produced by Giaiphong Film Studio and directed by Lê Hoàng Hoa.

== Plot ==
This romance comedy film follows the story of the life and loves of four female pupils whose names begin with the letter "H" (Hằng-Hạ-Hoa-Hân) and the male student Long before their graduation.

== Cast ==
- Việt Trinh ... Hằng
- Hồng Hạnh ... Hạ
- Hương Giang ... Hoa
- Bảo Hạnh ... Hân
- Lê Công Tuấn Anh ... Long
- Thiệu Ánh Dương ... Ngôn
- Lê Cung Bắc ... Mr. Quang – Hằng's father
- Kim Xuân ... Mrs. Quang – Hằng's mother
- Quang Đại ... Uncle Đăng
- Hoàng Phúc ... Đoàn Hùng
- Hữu Luân ... Teacher Minh
- Cao Thùy ... Teacher Tùng
- Lê Bình ... Teacher Ân
- Thụy Giao ... Trinh
- Kim Ngọc ... Hạ's mother
- Trần Ngân ... Thiện
- Tường Vân ... Principal
- Trọng Hải ... Vũ
- Xuân Bình ... Hiển

== Production ==
Location at Marie Curie High School in Ho Chi Minh City and somewhere in Dak Nong, began since 13 April 1992.

- Camera : Nguyễn Hòe, Minh Tuấn
- Designer : Phạm Nguyên Cẩn
- Costume : Ngọc Điệp
- Sound : Quang Đạo
- Music : Thanh Tùng (Farewell summer / Vĩnh biệt mùa hè), Từ Huy (? / Mong đợi ngậm ngùi), Nguyễn Ngọc Thiện (? / Cô bé dỗi hờn)
- Singer : Cẩm Vân and someones
