= Just the Two of Us Vietnam =

Vietnamese television series

- Genre: Reality television
- Developed by: VTV
- Presented by: Phan Anh; Thanh Ngọc
- Starring: see below
- Judges: Siu Black; Lê Hoàng; Lê Minh Sơn
- Country of origin: Vietnam
- Original language: Vietnamese
- No. of seasons: 1
- No. of episodes: 8

Production
- Executive producer: Lại Văn Sâm
- Camera setup: multi-camera
- Running time: 90-120 min.
- Production company: Cát Tiên Sa Production

Original release
- Network: VTV3
- Release: 9 October – 4 December 2011

Related
- Just the Two of Us Bước nhảy hoàn vũ; Season 2

Cặp đôi hoàn hảo (lit. 'The Perfect Couple') is the Vietnamese version of BBC UK series Just the Two of Us. The first season is set to air on Sunday 4 October at 9:00PM (UTC+7) on VTV3.

It was first announced that Cẩm Vân, Tuấn Khanh and director Phạm Hoài Nam would serve as permanent judges. Later director Lê Hoàng and Siu Black, the two familiar faces of Bước nhảy hoàn vũ were confirmed on the table with musician Lê Minh Sơn. Also, the fourth-judging spot of the table was introduced to be fulfilled by guests from week 2 onwards.

== Format ==
The show share the same format with its sister show Strictly Come Dancing (corresponding to Bước nhảy hoàn vũ in Vietnam). Selected celebrities are coupled with professional singers and they compete against each other each week in a sing-off to impress a panel of judges and ultimately the viewing public in order to survive potential elimination.

Through both telephone and SMS voting, viewers vote for the duo they think should remain in the competition. Judges scores which are half weight of the total scores, are also taken into account and are combined with the viewer votes when determining which duos stay and go each week.

== Couples ==
Celebrity	Occupation	Professional singer	Singing number	Status
Lê Kim Khánh	Dramatic Actress	Minh Quân	03	Withdrew on October 23, 2011
Phan Lê Ái Phương	Model	Noo Phước Thịnh	08	Eliminated 2nd on October 30, 2011
Vũ Nguyễn Hà Anh	Former model / Vietnam's Next Top Model host	Hồ Trung Dũng	05	Eliminated 3rd on November 6, 2011
Phạm Văn Mách	Professional bodybuilder	Văn Mai Hương	01	Eliminated 4th on November 20, 2011
Đinh Tiến Dũng	as Prof. Cù Trọng Xoay of Thư giãn cuối tuần	Phương Linh	06	Eliminated 5th on November 27, 2011
Quách Ngọc Ngoan	Actor	Nguyễn Ngọc Anh	04	2nd Runner-Up on December 4, 2011
Kim Thư	Actress	Đàm Vĩnh Hưng	02	1st Runner-Up on December 4, 2011
Huỳnh Trấn Thành	MC / TV host	Đoan Trang	07	Winner on December 4, 2011

== Chart ==
=== Scoring ===
Couples	Place	2	3	2+3	4	5	6	7	8
Trấn Thành & Đoan Trang	1	31	39	70	39	39	40+39=79	37+39=76	36+38+39=113
Kim Thư & Đàm Vĩnh Hưng	2	31	38	69	38	39	35+38=73	37+38=75	37+35+34=106
Ngọc Ngoan & Ngọc Anh	3	32	36	68	38	36	38+38=76	33+39=72	37+37+39=113
Tiến Dũng & Phương Linh	4	31^{W2}	36	67	35	36	37+36=73	36+34=70	Eliminated
Phạm V Mách & Mai Hương	5	32^{W1}	38	70	36	38	34+39=73	Eliminated	
Hà Anh & Trung Dũng	6	33	35	68	35	35	Eliminated		
Ái Phương & Noo	7	33	37	70	32	Eliminated			
Lê Khánh & Minh Quân	8	29	35	64	Eliminated				

red numbers indicate the lowest score for each week.
Green numbers indicate the highest score for each week.
Underlined numbers indicate the favorite contestant of the week
indicates the winning couple.
indicates the runner-up couple.
indicates the third-place couple.
indicates the returning couple that finished in the bottom two.
indicates the couple eliminated that week.
indicates the couple eliminated that week with the lowest total scores from either judges or audience' votes.
indicates the couple withdrawing while in the bottom two.

=== Call-out Order ===
Order	2+3	4	5	6	7	8
1	Tr.Thành & Đ.Trang	Tr.Thành & Đ.Trang	Tr.Thành & Đ.Trang	Tr.Thành & Đ.Trang	Tr.Thành & Đ.Trang	Tr.Thành & Đ.Trang
2	P.V.Mách & M.Hương^{W1}	K.Thư & Đ.V.Hưng	P.V.Mách & M.Hương	Ng.Ngoan & Ng.Anh	K.Thư & Đ.V.Hưng	K.Thư & Đ.V.Hưng
3	Ng.Ngoan & Ng.Anh	Ng.Ngoan & Ng.Anh	K.Thư & Đ.V.Hưng	T.Dũng & P.Linh	Ng.Ngoan & Ng.Anh	Ng.Ngoan & Ng.Anh
4	K.Thư & Đ.V.Hưng ^{W3}	T.Dũng & P.Linh	T.Dũng & P.Linh	K.Thư & Đ.V.Hưng	T.Dũng & P.Linh	
5	A.Phương & Noo	P.V.Mách & M.Hương	Ng.Ngoan & Ng.Anh	P.V.Mách & M.Hương		
6	T.Dũng & P.Linh ^{W2}	H.Anh & Tr.Dũng	H.Anh & Tr.Dũng			
7	L.Khánh & M.Quân	A.Phương & Noo				
8	H.Anh & Tr.Dũng					

This couple came in first place with the judges.
This couple came in last place with the judges.
This couple came in last place with the judges and was eliminated.
This couple was eliminated.
This couple withdrew.
This couple was audience's favorite of the week.
This couple came in first place with the judges and was audience's favorite of the week.
This couple came in last place with the judges and was audience's favorite of the week.
This couple won the competition.
This couple came in second in the competition.
This couple came in third in the competition

== Genres, scores and songs ==
=== Week 1 ===
Air date: 9 October, 2011
Theme(s): None
Location: Nguyen Du Gymnasium, Ho Chi Minh City
Guest judge: Not applied

Running order

Couple	Genre	Song
Phạm V Mách & Mai Hương	R&B	"Careless Whisper" – George Michael
Kim Thư & Đàm Vĩnh Hưng	Pop	"Trái tim không ngủ yên" – written by Thanh Tùng
Lê Khánh & Minh Quân	Rock	"Dẫu có lỗi lầm" – written by Hồ Hoài Anh
Ngọc Ngoan & Ngọc Anh	Ballad	"Đêm cô đơn" – written by Nguyễn Nhất Huy
Hà Anh & Trung Dũng	Tango	"Perhaps, Perhaps, Perhaps" – written by Osvaldo Farrés
Tiến Dũng & Phương Linh	Revolutionary-spirited	"Tình em" – written by Huy Du
Trấn Thành & Đoan Trang	Folk-inspired	"Tiếng trống Paranưng" – written by Trần Tiến
Ái Phương & Noo Phước Thịnh	Pop	"My Heart Will Go On" – Céline Dion from Titanic (1997 film)

=== Week 2 + 3 ===
==== Week 2 ====
Air date: 16 October
Theme(s): Pop or Ballad
Location: Van Don Gymnasium, Ho Chi Minh City
Guest judge: Hồ Hoài Anh

Individual judges' scores in charts below (given in parentheses) are listed in this order from left to right: Lê Minh Sơn - Siu Black - Hồ Hoài Anh - Lê Hoàng. The results of the voting is combined with the ranking of the panel of judges, and the celebrities have the higher scores in total survive.

Performing order

Couple	Jury		Genre	Song
Couple	Score	#	Genre	Song
Trấn Thành & Đoan Trang	31 (8,8,8,7)	4	Ballad	"Biển cạn"/"Bên em là biển rộng" medley – written by Kim Tuấn, Bảo Chấn respectively
Ngọc Ngoan & Ngọc Anh	32 (8,8,8,8)	6	Pop	"Người về nơi đâu" – written by Phạm Thanh Hà
Lê Khánh & Minh Quân	29 (8,7,8,6)	1	Pop	"Qua đêm nay" – written by Mạnh Quân
Kim Thư & Đàm Vĩnh Hưng	31 (8,8,8,7)	4	Ballad	"Hãy quay về khi còn yêu nhau" – by Hồ Quỳnh Hương
Hà Anh & Trung Dũng	33 (9,9,8,7)	8	Ballad	"Còn lại gì khi anh vắng em" – written by Hồ Trung Dũng himself
Ái Phương & Noo	33 (8,9,8,8)	8	Pop	"Em trong mắt tôi" – Nguyễn Đức Cường
Tiến Dũng & Phương Linh	31 (8,8,9,6)	4	Ballad	"Thôi anh hãy về" – Nguyễn Ngọc Thiện
Phạm V. Mách & Mai Hương	32 (8,8,8,8)	6	Pop	"Mưa rơi lặng thầm" – by M4U

==== Week 3 ====
Air date: 23 October
Theme(s): World Hits
Location: Nguyen Du Gymnasium, Ho Chi Minh City
Guest judge: Đức Huy
Guests' performances: Ngô Phương Lan & Nathan Lee ("A Whole New World" / "Can You Feel the Love Tonight" / "Beauty and the Beast (Disney)"), Lam Trường & Tiêu Châu Như Quỳnh ("Yêu em")

Individual judges' scores in charts below (given in parentheses) are listed in this order from left to right: Lê Minh Sơn - Siu Black - Đức Huy - Lê Hoàng. The results of the voting is combined with the ranking of the panel of judges, and the celebrities have the higher scores in total survive.

Performing order

Couple	Jury		Genre	Song
Couple	Score	#	Genre	Song
Hà Anh & Trung Dũng	35 (9,9,9,8)		Alternative rock	"Apologize" – OneRepublic
Lê Khánh & Minh Quân	35 (9,9,9,8)		World Music	"Jai Ho" – A.R. Rahman from Slumdog Millionaire
Ngọc Ngoan & Ngọc Anh	36 (9,9,9,9)			"Bésame Mucho" – written by Consuelo Velázquez
Trấn Thành & Đoan Trang	39 (9,10,10,10)		Dance-pop	"Born This Way" – Lady Gaga
Tiến Dũng & Phương Linh	36 (10,9,9,8)			"Can't Take My Eyes Off You" – Frankie Valli
Phạm V Mách & Mai Hương	38 (10,10,9,9)		R&B	"Hello" – Lionel Richie
Kim Thư & Đàm Vĩnh Hưng	38 (10,10,9,9)			"Touch by Touch" – Diana Ross
Ái Phương & Noo	37 (10,9,10,8)		R&B	"Umbrella" – Rihanna
Final showdown details
Act		Result		Song
Lê Khánh & Minh Quân		Withdrew		"Dẫu có lỗi lầm" – written by Hồ Hoài Anh
Hà Anh & Trung Dũng		Safe		not applied due to Lê Khánh & Minh Quân's withdrawal

Judges' vote to eliminate

- Lê Minh Sơn: N/A
- Siu Black: N/A
- Đức Huy: N/A
- Lê Hoàng: N/A

==== In combination ====
Couple	Jury		Audience		Total (1:1)
Couple	Score	#	Vote (%)	#	Total (1:1)
Hà Anh & Trung Dũng	33+35=68	4			
Lê Khánh & Minh Quân	29+35=64	1			
Ngọc Ngoan & Ngọc Anh	32+36=68	4			
Trấn Thành & Đoan Trang	31+39=70	8			
Tiến Dũng & Phương Linh	31+36=67	2			
Phạm V Mách & Mai Hương	32+38=70	8			
Kim Thư & Đàm Vĩnh Hưng	31+38=69	5			
Ái Phương & Noo	33+37=70	8			

=== Week 4 ===
Air date: 30 October
Theme(s): Rock / Folk-inspired
Location: Nguyen Du Gymnasium, Ho Chi Minh City
Guest judge: Nguyễn Cường

Individual judges' scores in charts below (given in parentheses) are listed in this order from left to right: Lê Minh Sơn - Siu Black - Nguyễn Cường - Lê Hoàng. The results of the voting is combined with the ranking of the panel of judges, and the celebrities have the higher scores in total survive.

Performing order

Couple	Jury		Audience		Total (1:1)	Genre	Song
Couple	Score	#	Vote (%)	#	Total (1:1)	Genre	Song
Tiến Dũng & Phương Linh	35 (10,8,10,7)	3				Folk	"Đi cấy" – from Thanh Hóa Province
Phạm Văn Mách & Mai Hương	36 (10,9,9,8)	5				Alternative rock	"Thu tình yêu" – Lưu Hương Giang
Trấn Thành & Đoan Trang	39 (10,10,10,9)	7				Folk-inspired	"Mười thương" – Quang Linh
Ái Phương & Noo	32 (9,8,8,7)	1				Funk rock	"Đám cưới chuột" – Gạt Tàn Đầy
Kim Thư & Đàm Vĩnh Hưng	38 (10,10,10,8)	6				Folk	"Lý quạ kêu" / "Trống cơm" – from Southern and Northern area
Hà Anh & Trung Dũng	35 (9,9,9,8)	3				Nu metal	"Bão đêm" – Microwave
Ngọc Ngoan & Ngọc Anh"	38 (10,10,10,8)	6				Folk-inspired	"Bông bí vàng" – Hương Lan

=== Week 5 ===
Air date: November 06
Genre(s): Hip hop / Dance / Blues-Jazz
Guest Judge: Lê Quang
Guest performances: Thanh Lam & Tùng Dương ("Tình nghệ sĩ"), Hồng Nhung & Minh Béo ("Lời của gió")

Individual judges' scores in charts below (given in parentheses) are listed in this order from left to right: Lê Minh Sơn - Siu Black - Lê Hoàng. The results of the voting is combined with the ranking of the panel of judges, and the celebrities have the higher scores in total survive.

Performing order

Couple	Jury		Audience		Total (1:1)	Genre	Song
Couple	Score	#	Vote (%)	#	Total (1:1)	Genre	Song
Trấn Thành & Đoan Trang	39 (10,10,10,9)	6		4	10	Blues-Jazz - Dance	"Cố xóa hết" – Hồ Ngọc Hà
Hà Anh & Trung Dũng	35 (9,9,9,8)	1		1	2	Jazz - Dance	"Tình 2000" – Thu Minh
Tiến Dũng & Phương Linh	36 (9,9,10,8)	3		6	9	Blues-Jazz	"Những phút giây qua" – written by Quốc Trường
Phạm Văn Mách & Mai Hương	38 (10,10,9,9)	4		2	6	Dance / Rap	"Em sẽ là giấc mơ" – Lưu Hương Giang
Ngọc Ngoan & Ngọc Anh	36 (9,9,10,8)	3		3	6	Blues-Jazz	"Mưa đêm" – written by Phan Tuấn Hùng
Kim Thư & Đàm Vĩnh Hưng	(10,10,10,9)	6		5	11	Blues-Jazz	"Nỗi lòng" & "Nhớ anh" Mash-up – written by Nguyễn Văn Khánh & Kỳ Phương, respectively

=== Week 6 ===
Air date: 20 November
Genre(s):
Guest judge: Việt Tú

Individual judges' scores in charts below (given in parentheses) are listed in this order from left to right: Lê Minh Sơn - Siu Black - Việt Tú - Lê Hoàng. The results of the voting is combined with the ranking of the panel of judges, and the celebrities have the higher scores in total survive.

Performing order

Couple	Jury		Audience		Total (1:1)	Genre	Song
Couple	Score	#	Vote (%)	#	Total (1:1)	Genre	Song
Phạm V Mách & Mai Hương	34 (9,9,9,7)	1					"Chuyện tình" – Mỹ Linh
Phạm V Mách & Mai Hương	39 (10,10,10,9)	1					"The Phantom of the Opera" – Andrew Lloyd Webber, transliterated by: Hà Quang Minh from the same name musical in 1986
Kim Thư & Đàm Vĩnh Hưng	35 (9,9,9,8)	3					"Cho em một ngày" – Thanh Lam
Kim Thư & Đàm Vĩnh Hưng	38 (10,10,10,8)	3					"Tôi muốn quên đi" / "Chưa để nỗi đau" – written by Nguyễn Đức Trung
Tiến Dũng & Phương Linh	37 (10,8,10,9)	3					"Tình đảo xa" / "Biển hát chiều nay" – written by Đinh Tiến Dũng himself and by Hồng Đăng respectively
Tiến Dũng & Phương Linh	36 (10,9,10,7)	3					"Can You Feel the Love Tonight" – Sir Elton John from The Lion King
Ngọc Ngoan & Ngọc Anh	38 (10,10,10,8)	4					"Đường xa ướt mưa" – Đức Huy
Ngọc Ngoan & Ngọc Anh	38 (10,10,10,8)	4					"All I Ask of You" – Andrew Lloyd Webber, transliterated by: Trịnh Minh Hiền from The Phantom of the Opera in 1986
Trấn Thành & Đoan Trang	40 (10,10,10,10)	5					"Ngẫu hứng sông Hồng" / "Ôi quê tôi" – written by Trần Tiến, by Lê Minh Sơn, respectively
Trấn Thành & Đoan Trang	39 (10,10,10,9)	5					"Les oiseaux qu'on met en cage (The Birds They Put in Cages)" – written by Riccardo Cocciante, lyrics by Luc Plamondon from the 2001 Notre Dame de Paris musical

=== Week 7 ===
Air date: 27 November
Genre(s): One genre not performed / Top hit from the partner
Guest judge: Phương Uyên

Individual judges' scores in charts below (given in parentheses) are listed in this order from left to right: Lê Minh Sơn - Siu Black - Phương Uyên - Lê Hoàng. The results of the voting is combined with the ranking of the panel of judges, and the celebrities have the higher scores in total survive.

Performing order

Couple	Jury		Audience		Total (1:1)	Genre	Song
Couple	Score	#	Vote (%)	#	Total (1:1)	Genre	Song
Trấn Thành & Đoan Trang	37 (10,10,9,8)	4		4	8	Dance	"Quạt giấy" – Đoan Trang
Trấn Thành & Đoan Trang	39 (10,10,10,9)	4		4	8	Rock	"Giận anh" – Phương Vy
Tiến Dũng & Phương Linh	36 (10,9,9,8)	1		2	3	Pop/Ballad	"Cơn gió lạ" – Phương Linh
Tiến Dũng & Phương Linh	34 (9,9,8,8)	1		2	3	Dance	"Đường cong" – Thu Minh
Kim Thư & Đàm Vĩnh Hưng	37 (10,10,9,8)	3		3	6	Dance	"Nửa vầng trăng" – Đàm Vĩnh Hưng
Kim Thư & Đàm Vĩnh Hưng	38 (10,10,10,8)	3		3	6	Rock	"Tình phai" – Lam Trường
Ngọc Ngoan & Ngọc Anh	33 (9,9,8,7)	2		1	3	Pop/Ballad	"Yêu thương mong manh" – Mỹ Tâm & Quang Dũng
Ngọc Ngoan & Ngọc Anh	39 (10,10,10,9)	2		1	3	Rock/Folk-inspired	"Ngọn lửa cao nguyên" – written by Trần Tiến, well-performed by Siu Black

=== Week 8 - Grand finale ===
Air date: 4 December
Genre(s):
Guest judge: Hồ Hoài Anh

Individual judges scores in charts below (given in parentheses) are listed in this order from left to right: Lê Minh Sơn - Siu Black - Hồ Hoài Anh - Lê Hoàng. The results of the voting is combined with the ranking of the panel of judges, and the celebrities have the higher scores in total survive.

Performing order

Couple	Jury		Audience		Total (1:1)	Genre	Song
Couple	Score	#	Vote (%)	#	Total (1:1)	Genre	Song
Ngọc Ngoan & Ngọc Anh	37 (10,10,9,8)	3		1	4		"Mùa thu cho em" – written by Ngô Thụy Miên
Ngọc Ngoan & Ngọc Anh	37 (9,10,10,8)	3		1	4		"Thuyền và biển" – written by Phan Huỳnh Điểu
Ngọc Ngoan & Ngọc Anh	39 (10,10,10,9)	3		1	4		"Ngẫu hứng Lý ngựa ô" – written by Trần Tiến
Kim Thư & Đàm Vĩnh Hưng	37 (10,10,9,8)	1		3	4		"Bản Thánh ca buồn" – Nguyên Vũ
Kim Thư & Đàm Vĩnh Hưng	35 (9,9,9,8)	1		3	4		"Vùng trời bình yên" – Hồng Ngọc feat. Đàm Vĩnh Hưng
Kim Thư & Đàm Vĩnh Hưng	34/35 (8/9,9,9,8)	1		3	4		"Tiếng trống Mê Linh" – act from the same name musical drama
Trấn Thành & Đoan Trang	36 (10,10,9,7)	3		2	5		"Chỉ có đôi ta" – written by Quốc Bảo
Trấn Thành & Đoan Trang	38 (9,10,10,9)	3		2	5		"Đất nước" / "Giai điệu Tổ Quốc" – written by Phạm Minh Tuấn, by Trần Tiến respectively
Trấn Thành & Đoan Trang	39 (10,10,9,10)	3		2	5		"Nữ thần" – originally by Đoan Trang
