= Saigon, I Love You =

- Theatrical release poster
- Directed by: Minh Thang Ly
- Written by: Do Minh Hoang Vo
- Starring: Đoan Trang; Lap Huynh; Huy Khanh
- Cinematography: Le Huu Hoai Nam
- Edited by: Phạm Thị Hảo; Julie Béziau
- Music by: Duc Tri; Le Anh Tu (sound)
- Release date: 7 October 2016
- Running time: 98 minutes
- Country: Vietnam
- Language: Vietnamese
- Budget: 8 billion VND

Saigon, I Love You (Vietnamese: Sài Gòn, anh yêu em) is a Vietnamese romantic comedy film produced by Ly Minh Thang in 2016. In 2017 it won a Golden Kite Prize by the Vietnam Cinematography Association for the best feature film, the highest distinction in Vietnamese cinema. In addition, it won Golden Kite prizes for best supporting actor (Huynh Lap), best screenplay, best production design, and best music. This is the first film directed by Ly Minh Thang.

The story, set in Saigon, describes five distinct plot lines related to ten individuals.

== Accolades ==
Award	Date of ceremony	Category	Recipient(s)	Result	Ref(s)
Golden Kite Prize	April 20, 2016	Best Feature Film	Ly Minh Thang	Won	
Golden Kite Prize	April 20, 2016	Best Supporting Actor - Feature film	Huynh Lap	Won	
Golden Kite Prize	April 20, 2016	Best Music - Feature film	Duc Tri	Won	
Golden Kite Prize	April 20, 2016	Best Art Design - Feature film	Nguyen Anh Thao	Won	
Golden Kite Prize	April 20, 2016	Best Screenwriter - Feature film	Ngoc Bich	Won	

== Reception ==
The film has won several awards including Best Feature Film at the Golden Kite awards, and saw a limited release in Australia where it was successful among Vietnamese Australians.
