= Nhật ký của mẹ =

2012 single by Hiền Thục

Single by Hiền Thục
- Released: 3 March 2012
- Genre: Pop
- Length: 8:12
- Label: Sư Tử Bạc Entertainment
- Songwriter: Nguyễn Văn Chung
- Producer: Nguyễn Văn Chung

"Nhật ký của mẹ" (lit. 'Mum's Diary') is a song composed and produced by Nguyễn Văn Chung, and was first performed by Hiền Thục. It was written in 2008, and released online in 2012.

It follows a mother's journey from her pregnancy days, on to raising the child after childbirth, and eventually to seeing the child off into the adult life. Not only does the message of maternal love of the lyrics touch the audience's heart, the song is also especially noted for its unorthodox visuals: sketches in the mother's diary, done by sand paintings by the composer himself. It is one of the more notable works concerning the topic, and has generally met with positive responses from music critics.

== Background ==
In 2008, as a gift to his mother, Chung wanted to write a song on motherly love that was different from what listeners have become accustomed to. He settled on presenting his lyrics as a diary of a mother, following her child's every step throughout the years. It took him roughly three days to finish the lyrics of the song. Spanning six pages, it told of a tale of a mother's emotions, from being pregnant with her child, giving birth, then witnessing them taking their first steps, taking their first words, then going to school, having relationships, and eventually growing up into a full adult, and working far away from home.

He decided on giving Hiền Thục the chance to debut the song, despite not personally knowing her. She accepted the offer to record the song in 2011. It took her quite some time to finally finish recording it, however, as she was often too emotional during the sessions, preventing her from wrapping up her work. The audio-only version of the song quickly took off; wishing to further this success, later, Chung decided to publish a music video, with the accompanying images being sand paintings entirely of his own work. He said that, as sand was "intimately acquainted with the sea, imagery long associated with a mother's unbounded love," it was appropriate for him to illustrate his words with art made from such material. He sought help from the artist Trí Đức, to learn the basics of the techniques, mainly to be able to more seamlessly blend the successive scenes together.

== Reception ==
After "Nhật ký của mẹ" was released on music streaming platforms in March 2012, it was met with great public attention, and its message resounded with many listeners. Its success was deemed to have stemmed from the simple but touching lyrics, cheap but vivid sand paintings, and a moving final delivery by Hiền Thục. It received numerous nominations from different awards, including "Song of the Year" from the 2013 Devoted Music Awards. Ultimately, it was July's "Best Song of the Month", as awarded by the programme Bài hát yêu thích (lit. 'Beloved Songs'). Chung himself once regarded it as his magnum opus, him then being known as a young composer specialising in love ballads. It is also one of Hiền Thục's biggest hits as well.

In 2015, it was featured in the album "The Best of Ballroom Music - Vol. 36" by the German label Casa Musica. It is a CD mainly intended for the dancing community, and is of little value elsewhere. Despite this, it was still a testament to the song's reach across the global audience; Chung said that he was proud that his work is now known even in such distant markets.
