= Cẩm Vân =

Vietnamese singer

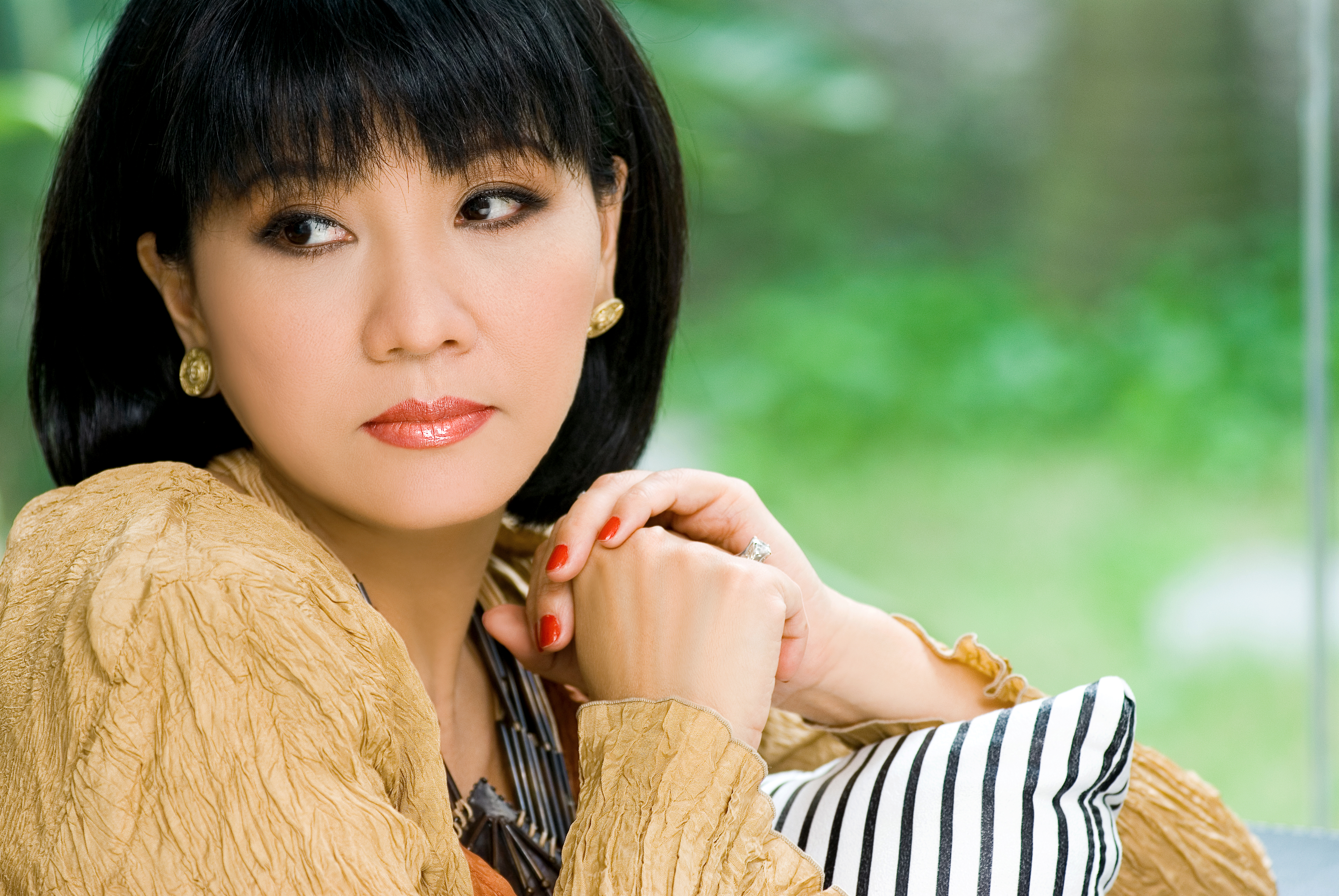

Background information
- Born: Hoàng Cẩm Vân; May 31, 1959 (age 67)
- Origin: Vietnam
- Genre: Pop
- Instruments: Singing
- Years active: 1982–

Hoàng Cẩm Vân (born 31 May 1959) is a Vietnamese female singer. She appeared on Vietnam Idol (season 1), and was scheduled to be a judge on Cặp đôi hoàn hảo (season 1).
