= Quang Vinh (singer) =

Vietnamese singer (born 1982)

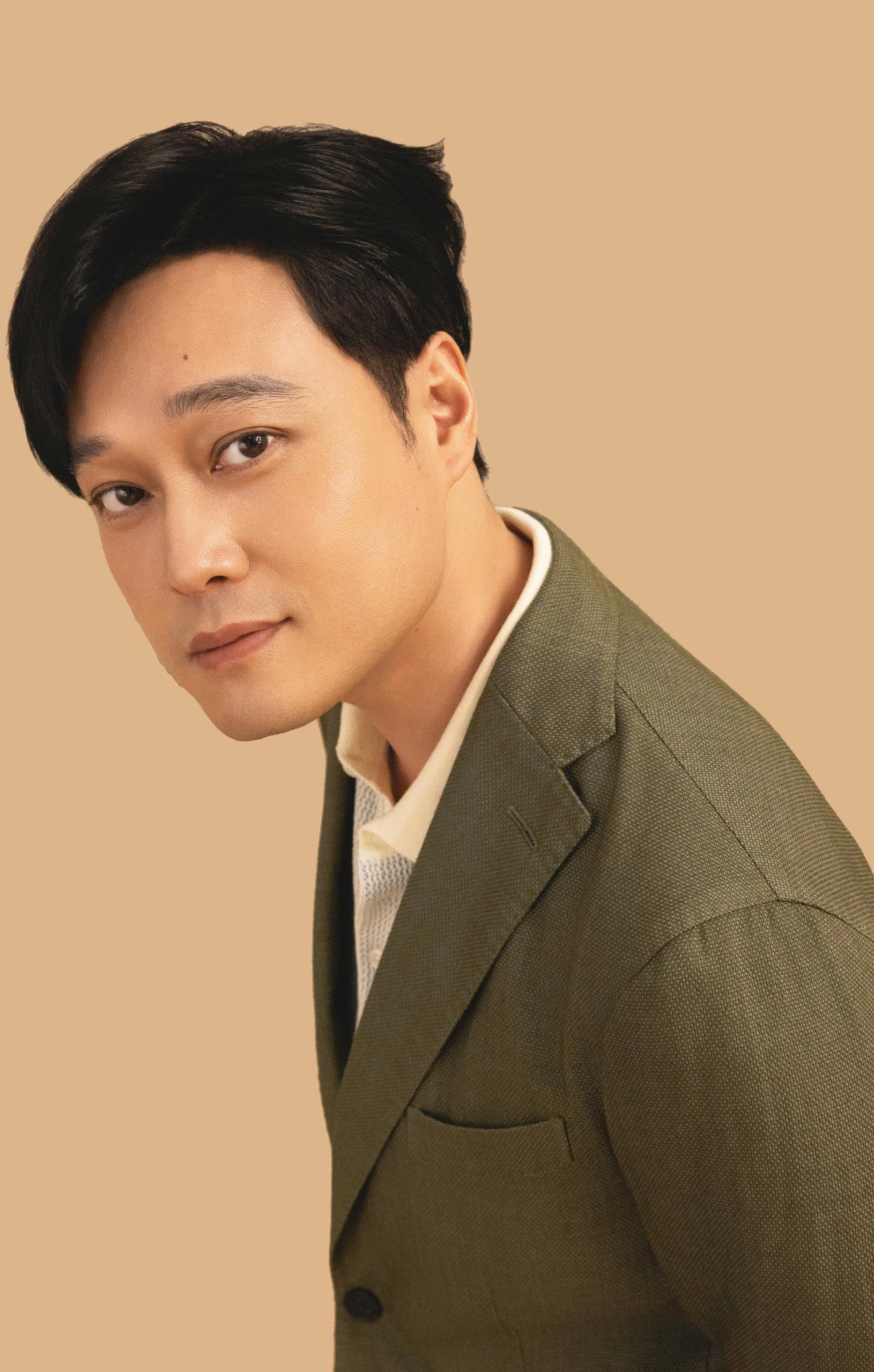
- Quang Vinh in 2026

Background information
- Born: Trần Quang Vinh; May 18, 1982 (age 44)
- Origin: Ho Chi Minh City, Vietnam
- Genre: Pop
- Instrument: Vocals
- Label: Quang Vinh Productions

Quang Vinh (full name: Trần Quang Vinh; born 18 May 1982), is a Vietnamese pop singer, actor, producer and YouTuber.

Quang Vinh's vocal talent was discovered at a very young age of 11 when he participated in "Đội Sơn Ca Nhà Thiếu Nhi Quận 1" in Ho Chi Minh City, and rapidly became well known for several hits such as "Cho Con", "Mẹ Hiền", "Tây Du Ký", and many more...

Some of the artist's career highlights were during his debut album, "Những Ngày Xưa Yêu Dấu" in 2000; when the music video for his song "Tình Yêu Tìm Thấy" was broadcast on national television channel VTV3; and the release of his fifth solo album, "Miền Cát Trắng" in 2003.

After a long hiatus, Quang Vinh returned to the entertainment scene with an acting role as ‘Đức Duy’ in the film "Tỉnh Giấc Tôi Thấy Mình Trong Ai", produced by actor Chi Pu. He had also put an emphasis on his comeback with a new song and music video "Điều Buồn Tênh", which reached over two million views on YouTube in just a short amount of time.

Currently, Quang Vinh is continuing his career in music. In addition to this long-term practice, he has channeled his passion for world exploration and experiencing new cultures into several travel shows of his own, where he is the producer and host: "Quang Vinh Passport", "Quang Vinh Đi Vietnam", "Quang Vinh Retreat", etc.

== Life and career ==
=== 1993–1998: Early career ===
Quang Vinh was born on May 18th, 1982 in Ho Chi Minh City, Vietnam. Although Vinh had come from a family with no particular creative background, he had shown a great deal of potential in his vocal and musical capabilities. Towards the end of the artist’s primary school years, Quang Vinh was submitted by his parents to participate in the city’s well-known children’s performing arts centre, "Đội Sơn Ca Nhà Thiếu Nhi Quận 1", along with singer Hiền Thục, and Phạm Thanh Lan (a member of Mặt Trời Đỏ, and former member of the famed harmonizing group, Cadillac). Since then, he and his other kids of his age began to appear regularly in musical performances such as competitions or festivals, which were also broadcast on the radio and national television.

Quang Vinh's commitment to the music scene as a child had earned him a position as one of his generation's greatest young voices with songs like "Mẹ Hiền Yêu Dấu", "Cho Con", "Thằng Bờm", "Tây Du Ký", "Trăng Tròn", "Tuổi của Trăng", "Heal the World", "Con Voi", "Cô Giáo Mới", "Cánh Én Tuổi Thơ", and "Ước Mơ Hồng". Since then, he was given a special nickname by children across the country, "Hoàng Tử Sơn Ca", or ‘Prince Nightingale’.

In 1998, he was sent to Monsignor Bonner High School in Drexel Hill, Pennsylvania, an all-male Augustinian Catholic high school. With an impending graduation, Quang Vinh decided to move back to Vietnam in 2000, in order to pursue his passion to become a singer. He then signed a contract with Kim Lợi Studio, and proceeded to release his dream debut album, "Những Ngày Xưa Yêu Dấu" in 2001.

=== 2000–2016: Professional singing career ===
During his time with Kim Lợi Studio, Quang Vinh had released 3 albums: "Những Ngày Xưa Yêu Dấu", "Nói Với Em… Phai Dấu Cuộc Tình", and "Dòng Sông Mùa Đông… Lãng Quên Cuộc Tình".

In the beginning of 2003, his contract with Kim Lợi Studio had expired. With this opportunity, Quang Vinh decided to change his musical direction and build a new image for himself through preparations to release his fourth album.

The music video for "Tình Yêu Tìm Thấy" was consisted of 2 versions: CD & VCD. Directed by Phan Điền, the video was filmed in Hanoi at multiple well-known locations such as the Memorial of Literature, Thê Húc Bridge, Tạ Hiện Street, Long Biên Bridge, St. Joseph’s Cathedral of Hanoi, One Pillar Pagoda, and West Lake.

Carrying a collection of Quang Vinh's core hits, the album "Tình Yêu Tìm Thấy" brought him several prizes following its release: Làn Sóng Xanh's Upcoming Artist in 2003, Ngôi Sao Bạch Kim 2003, and VTV's Bài Hát Tôi Yêu 2003.

Shortly after, the artist had also completed his first live concert in the country’s capital, Hanoi, with intentions to promote his fourth album, representing a new chapter in his musical career. Over 10,000 people attended. Following this great success, another concert took place in celebration of the very beginning of Quang Vinh’s career as a musician, "Hoàng Tử Sơn Ca - Vào Đời", or "the Birth of Prince Nightingale", at Lan Anh Sports Club in Ho Chi Minh City.

In 2004, Quang Vinh released two studio albums, Ngày Không Vội Vã (Unhurried Days) and Đánh Rơi Tình Yêu (Losing Love). The albums featured a combination of pop and R&B influences, reflecting a shift in his musical style.

Following the releases, Quang Vinh embarked on a nationwide concert tour from 10 to 31 October 2004, performing in Ho Chi Minh City, Hanoi, Da Nang and Can Tho. The tour featured approximately 12 songs, primarily selected from Ngày Không Vội Vã and Đánh Rơi Tình Yêu, and was organized to promote the two albums.

In 2005, Quang Vinh released the studio album Giữ Mãi Một Tình Yêu (Forever One Love). The album consists of twelve tracks, including Giữ Mãi Một Tình Yêu, Xin Hãy Quên Tôi, Đừng Khóc Vì Xa Anh, Nghìn Trùng Xa Cách, Trái Tim Mang Niềm Đau, Nơi Làm Anh Chùn Bước, Buồn Như Lá Rơi, Vẫn Yêu Em Như Ngày Nào, Khi Tình Phai Dấu, Xin Cho Tình Về Chốn Bình Yên, Hãy Ra Đi Và Quên Anh and Trái Tim Việt Nam. The album continued Quang Vinh’s signature pop ballad style.

The album was accompanied by a photobook, making Quang Vinh one of the early Vietnamese singers to release an album packaged together with a photobook. The project represented a new promotional format in the Vietnamese music market at the time.

In 2006, Quang Vinh launched the music project Xuân – Hạ – Thu – Đông (Spring – Summer – Autumn – Winter), consisting of four releases representing the four seasons: Lời Tình Xuân, Ve Kêu, Chuyện Ngày Hôm Qua and Anh Ru Em Ngủ.

The project began with the single Lời Tình Xuân, featuring four songs celebrating spring. It was followed by the album Ve Kêu, which contains twelve tracks inspired by school life and summer, including Ngày Xưa Yêu Dấu, Học Trò, Mùa Hè Xanh, Ngôi Trường Dấu Yêu, Cô Bé Dỗi Hờn, Mong Đợi Ngậm Ngùi, Tình Thơ, Một Thời Để Nhớ, Tạm Biệt and Tuổi Thơ.

Later that year, Quang Vinh released Chuyện Ngày Hôm Qua, featuring nine songs, including Trả Lại Cho Nhau, Em Quên Một Lời Chia Tay, 2+1=0, Những Ân Tình Ngày Xưa, Tình Yêu Diệu Kỳ and Người Ở Lại. The project concluded with Anh Ru Em Ngủ, a ten-track album featuring songs such as Anh Ru Em Ngủ, Khúc Hát Chim Trời, Có Còn Là Riêng Anh, Vẽ Trái Tim, Tuyết Chưa Tan, Chào Người Tôi Yêu, Tình Xanh, Tìm Em Đêm Giáng Sinh, Tình Như Là Gió and Gọi Tình Trăm Năm.

The release of four albums within a single year marked one of the most active periods of Quang Vinh’s recording career before he continued with subsequent album projects.

The year 2007 was when the artist collaborated with Bảo Thy to release the album, "Ngôi Nhà Hoa Hồng", which sold over 100,000 copies in a short time. The collaborative effort had produced many great hits, such as: "Ngôi Nhà Hoa Hồng", "Dịu Dàng Đến Từng Phút Giây", and "Vẫn Tin Mình Có Nhau". The pair went on to become one of the most loved duet partnerships in the music industry.

The following year, Quang Vinh released the album "Day & Night", which earned him two prestigious prizes: " Golden Album" award and "Fan's Favorite Album" award.

=== 2016–2021: Comeback onstage ===
On 11 November 2016, Quang Vinh returned to the music scene with the single "Điều Buồn Tênh" after a long hiatus. Then, as an act of gratitude to his fans, the artist released the album "Greatest Hits/The Memories", where he had recorded his most well-known songs since the beginning of his musical journey. The album received tremendous recognition and songs like "Phai Dấu Cuộc Tình" gained over 43 million views on Quang Vinh's official YouTube channel.

The year 2020 marked the first collaboration between Quang Vinh and the "King of Ballad", Mr. Siro, when the two came together to release a new music video for "Lạnh Từ Trong Tim". The visuals were filmed at Bà Nà Hills with the appearances of 11 celebrities across the entertainment fields such as: Diễm My 9x, Trịnh Xuân Nhản, Liz Kim Cương, Lynk Lee, Ma Ran Đô, Đinh Phương Nam, fashionista Thuận Nguyễn, and others. The music video took in a total of two billion Vietnamese đồng, which was Quang Vinh's most funded and epic project in his career up to date.

=== 2021–2022: Quang Vinh Retreat ===
In 2021, Quang Vinh launched Quang Vinh Retreat (Season 1), a music and travel series produced by himself. The program consists of ten episodes, each featuring an acoustic/live duet with a guest artist, filmed at luxury resorts across Vietnam. The project combines music, travel, and lifestyle content.

The episodes feature the following songs:

- “Nếu Em Đi” (with Jun Phạm)
- “Đêm Lạnh” (with Hiền Thục)
- “Thà Rằng Chia Tay” (with Phạm Quỳnh Anh)
- “Nếu” (with Quốc Thiên)
- “Vì Một Người” (with Yến Trang)
- “Và Cơn Mưa Tới” (with Lynk Lee)
- “Ước Có Người Bên Tôi Mỗi Khi Buồn” (with Tăng Phúc)
- “Căn Phòng Mưa Rơi” (with Trung Quân)
- “Dù Đã Có” (with Thảo Trang)
- “Khi Người Lớn Cô Đơn” (with Ali Hoàng Dương)

In 2022, all ten recordings from the series were released digitally as the album Quang Vinh Retreat on major streaming platforms.

=== 2023–present: Further projects ===
In 2023, Quang Vinh released the live album Chill Sunday (Live in Hanoi), documenting performances from his Chill Sunday mini concert in Hanoi.

On 31 July 2024, Quang Vinh released the EP NOW & FOREVER, marking his return to new music releases after several years focusing on travel and lifestyle projects. The EP contains five tracks:

- “Chẳng Phai (Love You)”
- “Em Là Nhà”
- “Tiếc Những Phôi Phai”
- “Thoáng Qua (My Love)”
- “Kết Thúc Khi Chưa Bắt Đầu (Solo Version)”

Throughout 2025, Quang Vinh released several standalone singles and collaborations with younger artists, including:

- “Kiêu Ngạo”
- “Áng Mây Sẽ Nở Hoa”
- “Hồng Nhan”
- “Đổi Biệt Danh Thành Tên Đầy Đủ” (with DICKSON)
- “Rẽ Trái Rẽ Phải” (with Diệp Bảo Ngọc)
- “Tình Yêu Không Thể Phá Vỡ”
- “Lá Rơi Chiều Thu”
- “Hoa Nở Trái Mùa”
- “Nhủ Lòng” (with Ssay Huỳnh)

On 6 June 2026, Quang Vinh released his sixth studio album, TIM, marking his return to the studio album format 13 years after Love Songs (2013). The album contains eleven tracks written and produced by Mr. Siro, Bảo Thạch, Ân Nhi, Krazy Park, Ssay Huỳnh, and Thống. It also features guest vocals by Bảo Thy on “Ôm Anh Khi Em Muốn Khóc” and Jin Ju on “Mong Chúng Ta Hạnh Phúc”, including a Korean-language version. The album attracted significant public attention and marked a renewed period of musical activity for Quang Vinh following several years devoted primarily to travel and digital content projects.

== Filmography ==
Quang Vinh had once began a contract with film company TFS, and granted a leading role as a teacher - Thầy Gia in the 10-episode series "Nữ Sinh", which was adapted from 3 famous novels by author Nguyễn Nhật Ánh (Nữ Sinh, Buổi Chiều Windows, and Bồ Câu Không Đưa Thư).

In 2016, he made a new comeback for the role Duc Duy in the movie "Wake Up" which was produced by actress Chi Pu.

== Travel blog ==
Aside from his musical endeavors, Quang Vinh had also gained recognition through his role as a travel blogger since his return to the entertainment business in 2016. The reality travel show Quang Vinh Passport takes the audience to many corners of the world, such as Spain, the Maldives, Russia, Taiwan, Singapore, Bhutan, the Philippines and Bal.

2019: Quang Vinh represented Vietnam, to participate in Taiwan's "Embracing Taiwan" (a national television program) - The host travel to Taiwan to explore and experience its culture and the local cuisine that is rich and distinct flavours, along with Thailand, the Philippines, India, Malaysia and others.

2020: Introduction of a new travel show, "Quang Vinh Đi Vietnam". There are 28 episodes, where Quang Vinh is joined by a celebrity guest for each episode.

2021: Quang Vinh continues to release another travel/musical show, "Quang Vinh Retreat", taking the audience to breathtaking sceneries of Vietnam, paired with duet performances with celebrity guests.

== Discography ==
- TIM (2026)
- Luôn Nghĩ Về Nhau (2023)
- Trung Thu Hoan Ca ( với Hiền Thục 2022)
- Nếu em đi (Single) (2021)
- Lạnh từ trong tim (Single) (2020)
- Đừng yêu ai đậm sâu (Single) (2018)
- Greatest Hits/The Memories (2017)
- "Điều buồn tênh" (Single) (2016)
- Love Songs (2013)
- Beautiful Lover (CD + DVD) (2012)
- "Lạc trong nỗi đau" (Single) (2012)
- Thiên thần khóc (CD + VCD) (2011)
- "Đón xuân" (Single) (2011)
- Mơ một giấc mơ (CD + VCD) (2010)
- Day & Night (CD + VCD) (2008)
- Ngôi nhà hoa hồng (CD) (2007)
- Anh ru em ngủ (CD + VCD) (2007)
- Chuyện ngày hôm qua (CD + VCD) (2006)
- Ve kêu (CD) (2006)
- "Lời tình xuân" (Single) (2006)
- Giữ mãi một tình yêu (CD) (2005)
- Đánh rơi tình yêu (CD) (2004)
- Ngày không vội vã (CD, VCD) (2004)
- Miền cát trắng (CD) (2003)
- Vào đời (CD + VCD) (2003)
- Tình yêu tìm thấy (CD, VCD, Karaoke) (2003)
- Xin đừng hoài nghi (VCD, DVD, Karaoke) (2002)
- Dòng sông mùa đông... lãng quên cuộc tình (CD) (2002)
- Nói với em... phai dấu cuộc tình (CD, VCD, Karaoke) (2002)
- Những ngày xưa yêu dấu (CD, VCD, Karaoke) (2001)

== Awards and honors ==
Awards and Recognition

- Global Voyager, Men’s Folio Male Icon Awards 2025 (Men’s Folio Vietnam).
- Individual Honor, Travellive Hotlist 2025.
- Influencer Voice, Travellive Hotlist 2025.
- Male Luxury Lifestyle Influencer of the Year, LUXUO Asia Awards 2024.
- Next Travel Influencer, Next Awards 2024.
- Most Inspiring Travel Influencer of the Year, Travellive Hot List 2024.
- Leading Travel Influencer, Best Hotels & Resorts Awards – Wanderlust 2024.
- Travel Influencer of the Year, Men’s Folio Male Icon Awards 2023.
- Travel Blogger of the Year, Men & Life Awards 2022.

Public Activities

- In September 2025, Quang Vinh was selected as an Official Promotion Ambassador representing Vietnam at Expo Osaka 2025, in partnership with YouTube and Google.
- In October 2025, he became the host of Branded Living, a television program showcasing luxury branded residences developed by Masterise Homes.
- In November 2025, he joined the Global Influencer Program promoting Cappadocia and Konya in collaboration with Turkish Airlines.
- In 2023, he participated in a promotional campaign for Manila and Boracay organized by the Philippine Department of Tourism.
- In April 2023, he represented Vietnam in the Phase 2 Neighbourhood campaign by the Singapore Tourism Board (STB), promoting tourism to Singapore.
- In 2019, he filmed a documentary for the Saving Coral Project at Six Senses Ninh Van Bay, Nha Trang.
- In 2019, he and his fan club participated in Kenh14’s Less Plastic Campaign.
- In 2019, he represented Vietnam in the Embracing Taiwan program, organized by Taiwan’s Ministry of Foreign Affairs in collaboration with Zee TV India.
- In 2019, he was invited as a Guest of Honor and Speaker at Pines International Academy in Baguio, Philippines.
- From 2019 to 2020, he served as an ambassador for Change Vietnam and WildAid in the Saving Wild Animal Program.
- He served as a judge for Kenh14’s Here We Go Travel Awards in 2016 and 2018.
- In 2018, he was a judge and trainer for the Global Camp to Singapore, an educational program for Vietnamese students.
- 2008: Golden Album Award: Favorite Album (Day & Night)
- 2006: Favourite Album (Ve Kêu) - Chương trình Sắc màu âm nhạc (Colour of Music) (May 2006)
- 2006: Favourite Song voted by Audience ("Tự tin nói lời yêu thương") - Chương trình Nhạc Việt (Viet Music) (February 2006)
- 2006: Favourite Artist - Chương trình Nhạc Việt (Viet Music) (February 2006)
- 2006: Favourite Album ("Giữ Mãi Một Tình Yêu") - Chương trình sắc màu âm nhạc (Colour of Music) (January 2006)
- 2005: Favourite Music Video for Miền Cát Trắng - VTV Bài hát tôi yêu
- 2004: Làn Sóng Xanh Music Award for Miền Cát Trắng
- 2003: Best New Artist - Làn Sóng Xanh Music Award
- 2003: Best New Artist - Plantinum Star Music Award
- 2003: Favourite Music Video for Tình Yêu Tìm Thấy - VTV Bài hát tôi yêu
