= Đoan Trang =

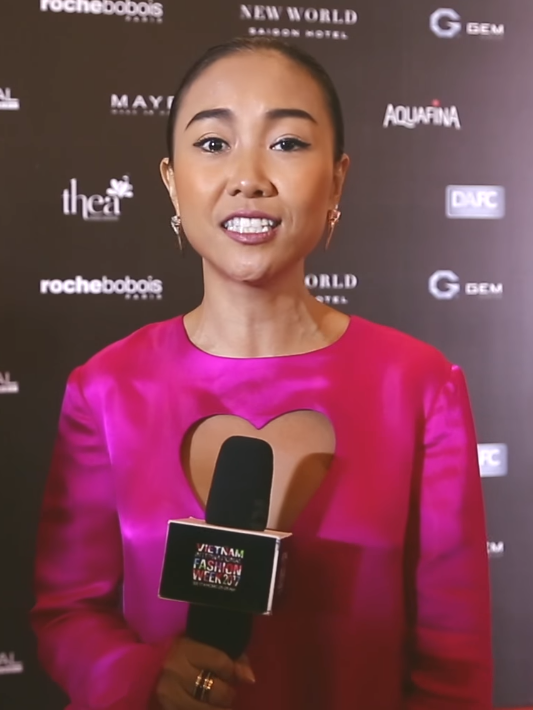
- Doan Trang in 2017

Background information
- Born: Cao Thị Đoan Trang; 4 February 1978 (age 48)
- Origin: Đồng Nai, Vietnam
- Genres: Pop, Latin, Dance-pop, R&B
- Occupation: Singer
- Instrument: Singing
- Years active: 2001–
- Website: http://doantrang.biz/

Cao Thị Đoan Trang (born 4 February 1978 in Dong Nai, Vietnam) is a contemporary Vietnamese pop/Latin-influenced singer residing in Vietnam. Generally, she is referred to as Đoan Trang.

Starting her career by participating in music shows and winning prizes when she was a student of two universities (HUFLIT and Ho Chi Minh City's Music Institute), she became more known when she was the runner up of The Voice of Ho Chi Minh City Broadcast Station 2001 contest.

Beside her real name which is also stage name Doan Trang, she's also referred as "Chocolate" by the press and audience for her tanned skin and it was one of her hit songs.

== Discography ==
Doan Trang was born on February 4, 1978, in Dong Nai. When she was little, she lived in Long Khanh commune of Dong Nai Province in a family of 6, including her parents, one elder sister and two younger brothers. One of her younger brothers whose named Cao Minh Trung is a drummer of Microwave band. She was exposed to have interest in music since early age, as she performed many children songs at many different stages when only 5, she was also a key member of the province's culture house as well as some music contests right where she was studying. She didn't seem to miss any singing activities during her time at school, and she always won at any cost.

In 1992, at 14 years old she had to leave family to enroll at a high school in Ho Chi Minh City. In 1995, she passed Technical Department of Vocal – Ho Chi Minh City Music Institute, she also enrolled at Pedagogic English of Ho Chi Minh University of Foreign Language and Information Technology (HUFLIT), although studying at two universities at the same time, she still managed to participate in many activities, especially Green Summer Campaign and other society activities. In spring 1999, she was chosen to be one of many students to have a visit the troop at the border for her enthusiastic contribution.

=== Growing up from movements ===
She was still a familiar face of many music shows for student at universities and won many prizes. During this time, she also performed at bars and music rooms in the city to earn extra for the school fee of two younger brothers and for her school fee also. She was voted to be one of 10 excellent student of HUFLIT (class of 1995–1999)

In 1998, she competed in the contest "Voice of students of City", which was for students at highschools, colleges and universities in Ho Chi Minh City. In this contest, she won first prize and later became representative of the city to join National Voice of Student contest in Ha Noi where she was a runner up.

Apart from joining in activities at school, she also took part in “The Voice of Ho Chi Minh City Broadcast Station” singing contest in 1997. The contest was a major platform that gave an opportunity to new talent in Ho Chi Minh City and South Vietnam and made artists like Thu Minh, Dam Vinh Hung, Duc Tuan, and Thanh Thuy launch their careers.

=== The path to become professional singer ===
In 1999, post graduation with excellent degree of vocal – Ho Chi Minh City Music Institute, she was offered to work at Singapore Airline, which was suitable to her English ability with high salary. However, she decided to pursue professional singing as she registered Green Rhythm Club and performed at some entertainment spot in the city.

In 2001, once again she competed in The Voice of Ho Chi Minh City Broadcast Station and was a runner up, this time, she performed the song Vo Tinh written by Tran Tien, the song was a success and highly rated with the nearly same score of winner Tu Anh, this could be said to be one of new chapters of her career. She continued to get many offers from producers and entertainment agencies. However, she pursued to be an independent singer and developed her career in her own way.

In 2002, she introduce a series of hit songs at that time including: Forget Me Not, Khi Ta 20,...Especially, the song Forget Me Not written by Quoc An was recorded and produced into three different version including techno, slow and electronic. For this song, she was nominated for New Artist of The Year award of Green Wave Awards. In 2005, she received award from 7th Green Wave Awards, as being one of 10 Favorite Artist of The Year Awards for two songs "Toc Hat" and "Bang Khuang", as they were charted in top 5 of Green Wave music chart for many weeks. This was the first time she won Green Wave Awards. However, some newspapers shared opinions that she didn't deserve the award but singer Thanh Thao instead who had more successful songs and suspected that the vote was not fair.

In July 2007, she had a short term course in the US for 5 weeks at University Berklee which is a famous music university in Boston, Massachusetts. The course was called "Summer Performance Program" where she studied about vocal, music theory, stage performance skill and R&B with Latin Pop genres.

=== Liveshow Khi Toi 20 ===
In 2004, she held first liveshow Khi Toi 20 at Hue, as the liveshow was carefully prepared, alongside the attendance of many singers like Ngoc Anh, Tran Tam, Nguyen Phi Hung, Ly Hari...the liveshow was sponsored and live aired on 7 big channels of Vietnam: Hai Phong, Ha Noi, Hue, Da Nang, Nha Trang, Ho Chi Minh City and Can Tho. In the liveshow, she performed 10 songs as they were songs that made her name well known: Khi Toi 20, Vo Tinh, Cam On Mot Doa Xuan Ngoai, Forget Me Not,...

The liveshow was expected to boost her reputation. However, it was not as successful as expected, due to miscommunication between singers as they didn't have proper rehearsal together, some guest singers like My Le, Thu Minh, Tuan Hung didn't make it due to their personal schedules, later she admitted: "All the guests are specialized in pop while I pursue energetic Latin pop. It's why I didn't get to active in many performances". Besides, the overall script of the liveshow was also cut to many individual parts as well as the distribution of the performances was not really well prepared.

=== Socodance ===
In May 2006, she released the album titled Socodance, which consisted nine dance songs. However, shortly after, it was rumored that the idea of Socodance was originally from singer Nhat Thien Bao without his permission, things got more complicated as one of the articles of Vietnamnet titled "Stealing music ideas, this couldn't be a joke" on the Internet, the articled wrote that singer Nhat Thien Bao had invited her to be featured in his album Bao Dance in the process and she took those songs for later albums without permission.

=== The Explanation ===
After the article's release, the spoke person of Soco Production which was the crew to craft and produce her music projects sent a message to many presses and newspapers with the titled "Official statement of Nhat Thien Bao and Doan Trang" (along with the signatures of both). The statement was about: the songs in the album of Nhat Thien Bao was mostly house, trance and hip-hop of 90's while Socodance was under the influence of 50-70's slow, tango, valse, chachacha,...Moreover, the idea of Socodance had been firstly discussed back in December 2005 while she was still being in the process of making album single Da Khuc, therefore Socodance was initiated following the suggestion of Tu Phi and her brother Cao Trung Hieu (one of the member of SoCo Production). Beside the statement, SoCo Production also sent an email to the press saying "I'm the person who is responsible for the idea of SoCodance as well as produced the album of SoCo Production" by Tu Phi.

On April 28, 2006, during an interview with Vietnamnet, singer Nhat Thien Bao shared that the idea of the album Bao Dance was from Le Minh Ha who had proposed and presented the idea with him and later he agreed to work on Bao Dance.

Doan Trang also sent mail to the newspaper which had posted the article regarding the conflict, according to her, it was "made up" and "badly influencing our reputation" (her and SoCo Production). To discover that the newspaper didn't put right disclaimer, she used to plan to sue the author of the article, however she cancelled it.

However, a few days later, they had a meet up with the press, both was happy and open to each other, opposed to the assumption that two would be awkward, both confirmed that the debate regarding SoCodance was a misunderstanding and everything was pushed too far.

=== Post SoCodance ===
After the incident of Socodance right after the release, the album was successful to sell 15,000 copies, as being one of her best selling albums so far. Some said thank to the scandal, the album was sold out quickly. However, during an interview, she shared that: "I'm so happy that my new idea and style was welcomed by the audience. Although, there were lots of things happened during the process, as some accused me of stealing Nhat Thien Bao's idea, some said that I created the scandal myself to boost my fame..Actually, it's never my working ethnic. The quality of SoCodance proves everything against those accusations"

=== Hattori Memorial Music Festival ===
In September 2006, she was invited to perform at Hattori Memorial Music Festival by the organizer at Osaka (Japan), this was the first time for a Vietnamese singer to participate in this music festival. The key condition to be invited is those who have mass influence to the audience. She performed along with 20 famous Japanese singers and some from Asian countries such as: China, Indonesia, Korea,...In this festival, she performed three songs in total which were Bang Khuang, Socola, and Ngau Hung Song Hong. All songs were remixed following symphony techno and Latin rock.

Her performance was said to be successful as later she received many collaboration offers after the festival. Mr. Misachi (music director of Ryochi Hattori Music Festival) gave a comment as: "I didn't expect that little woman like Doan Trang could be able to perform with an energetic voice. Although I don't know Vietnamese but through her demonstration, I got to understand contemporary music genre of Vietnam and she could be considered as Utada Kitaru – a famous Japanese female singer. Hopefully we will have chance to collaborate with her more in the future and to introduce Vietnamese music in Japan". Also during this trip, she was awarded a Memorial medal from the Major of Osaka and the chairman of Ryochi Hattori Music Club, alongside two singers from Indonesia and China to be invited to perform at the final round of StreetGrandPrix2006 which is a talent show of Japan.

=== Am Ban and The Unmakeup ===
In December 2007, she released 4th studio album titled Am Ban consisted songs mostly written by female songwriters. The album expressed feminism and her new direction to Jazz and Blues instead of Latin like previous albums. In March 2008, the album Am Ban won Golden Album Award which was voted by Art Council. At the award, she also revealed some details about her 5th album The Unmakeup as a collection of hit songs but translated in English and remixed. However, there wasn't any official statement regarding this album beside she stopped collaborating with songwriter Quoc Bao.

== Music style ==
At the first stage of her career, in order to have personal style and remark, she experimented many music genres from ballad, pop,...However, in the end, she decided to pursue Latin genre alongside tribal choreography, it could be said to be a risky decision since Latin was a brand new genre which had entered Vietnam for a short time, and there was any singer experimenting such upbeat music genre. There were couple opinions that she was into it and copied Shakira or Jennifer Lopez, those that she admires. She shared: "I love Latin music and admire Jennifer Lopez with Shakira, so I try to pursue it to fulfill my music passion"

Songwriter Minh Man, who is a remixing expert, commented Doan Trang as: She knows how to ignite the fire, a kind of blue fire of blues genre along with upbeat Latin music, therefore her performance is always powerful and mysterious. Not only that, she also confidently showed up in the show Immortal Songs to sing those songs that people thought she would never be able to adapt it"

=== Albums ===
Debut album: Bốn Mùa Tình Yêu

- Track listing
1. Bốn Mùa Tình Yêu
2. Em Vẫn Yêu Anh
3. Hát Cho Tình Yêu
4. Mắt Nhung
5. Mùa Đông Đi Qua
6. Sẽ Yêu Hơn Ngày Xưa
7. Sao Anh Ra Đi
8. Tuyết Rơi Mùa Hè
9. Yêu Nhau Trong Mùa Xuân

Second album: Chocolate

- Track listing
1. Bâng Khuâng
2. Sôcôla (feat. Ha Okio)
3. Tóc Hát
4. Những Khi Ta Buồn
5. Tia Nắng Bình Yên
6. Tình Đến Một Ngày
7. Hạnh Phúc Xa Vời
8. Hãy Sống Với Con Tim
9. Hãy Tin Ở Tim Mình
10. Phố Mưa
11. Bâng Khuâng [Hiphop Version, feat. Ha Okio
12. Tóc Hát [Electronica Version]

Third album: Socodance

- Track listing
1. Dừng Bước Giang Hồ
2. Ngân Khúc Tango
3. Tình Yêu Đến Trong Giã Từ
4. Bước Nhảy Thiên Thần
5. Em Vẫn Yêu Anh
6. Dòng Sông Xanh
7. Thu Ca
8. Bước Chân Vui
9. Rock'n Roll Cho Em

Fourth album: Negative Proff

=== Singles ===
Trái Tim Buồn

- Track listing
1. Trái Tim Buồn
2. Đến Bên Em
3. Kỷ Niệm Ngày Thơ
4. Ước Mộng

Dạ Khuc

- Track listing
1. Intro
2. Dạ Khúc feat. Hà Okio (Electronica Version)
3. Lời Dẫn 1
4. Dạ Khúc (Acoustic Version)
5. Lời Dẫn 2
6. Dạ Khúc feat. Hà Okio (Hiphop Version)
7. Lời Dẫn 3
8. Dạ Khúc (Orchestra Version)
9. Lời Dẫn 4
10. Dạ Khúc (Orchestra Instrumental)
11. Tiếng Yêu Thương
12. Vì Em Chính Là Em

== Dancing With The Stars ==
She competed in Dancing With The Stars 2012 Vietnam version and her partner is Evgeni Lyubomirov Popov, they were the runner-up with the final score as 36.5. The average score of the judge from left to right (Le Hoang – Khanh Thi – Nguyen Quang Dung – Chi Anh): 8.8; 9.6; 9.4; 8.8.

Dance's	Score	Song
Cha Cha	28.5	Let's Get Loud by Jennifer Lopez
Quickstep	34	Can't Hurry Love by The Supremes
Jive	37	La Bamba
Slow Foxtrot	40	Fever-TBA
Samba	40	Whenever Wherever by Shakira
Tango	33	La Cumparsita" —- Gerardo Matos Rodrígue

== Filmography ==
- Saigon, I Love You (2016)

== Reality TV shows ==
=== Gameshow ===
Year	Program	Role
2010	Bước nhảy hoàn vũ	Contestant
2011	Bước nhảy hoàn vũ	MC
2023	Chị đẹp đạp gió rẽ sóng	Contestant
