= Vũ Hoàng Điệp =

Vietnamese beauty pageant titleholder

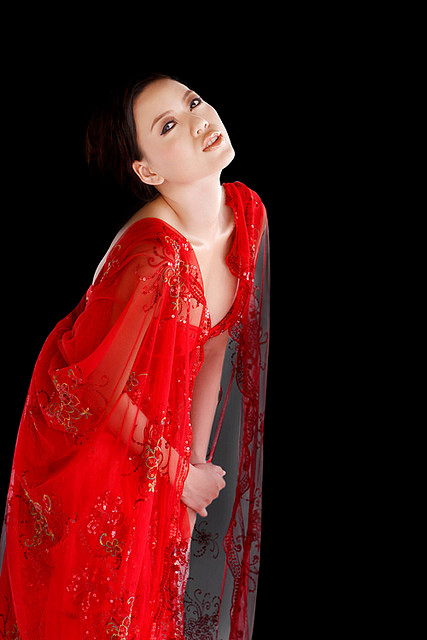
- Born: Vũ Hoàng Điệp; November 22, 1987 (age 38); Hanoi, Vietnam
- Beauty pageant titleholder
- Title: Miss Sea Vietnam 2007 (1st runner-up); Miss Vietnam 2008 (People's Choice-award); Miss International Beauty2009 (Winner)

Vũ Hoàng Điệp (born November 22, 1987, in Hanoi) is a Vietnamese beauty pageant titleholder. She is the first Vietnamese to win a major beauty contest, the 2009 Miss International Beauty, in Chengdu, China on August 1, 2009.
