= Hiền Thục =

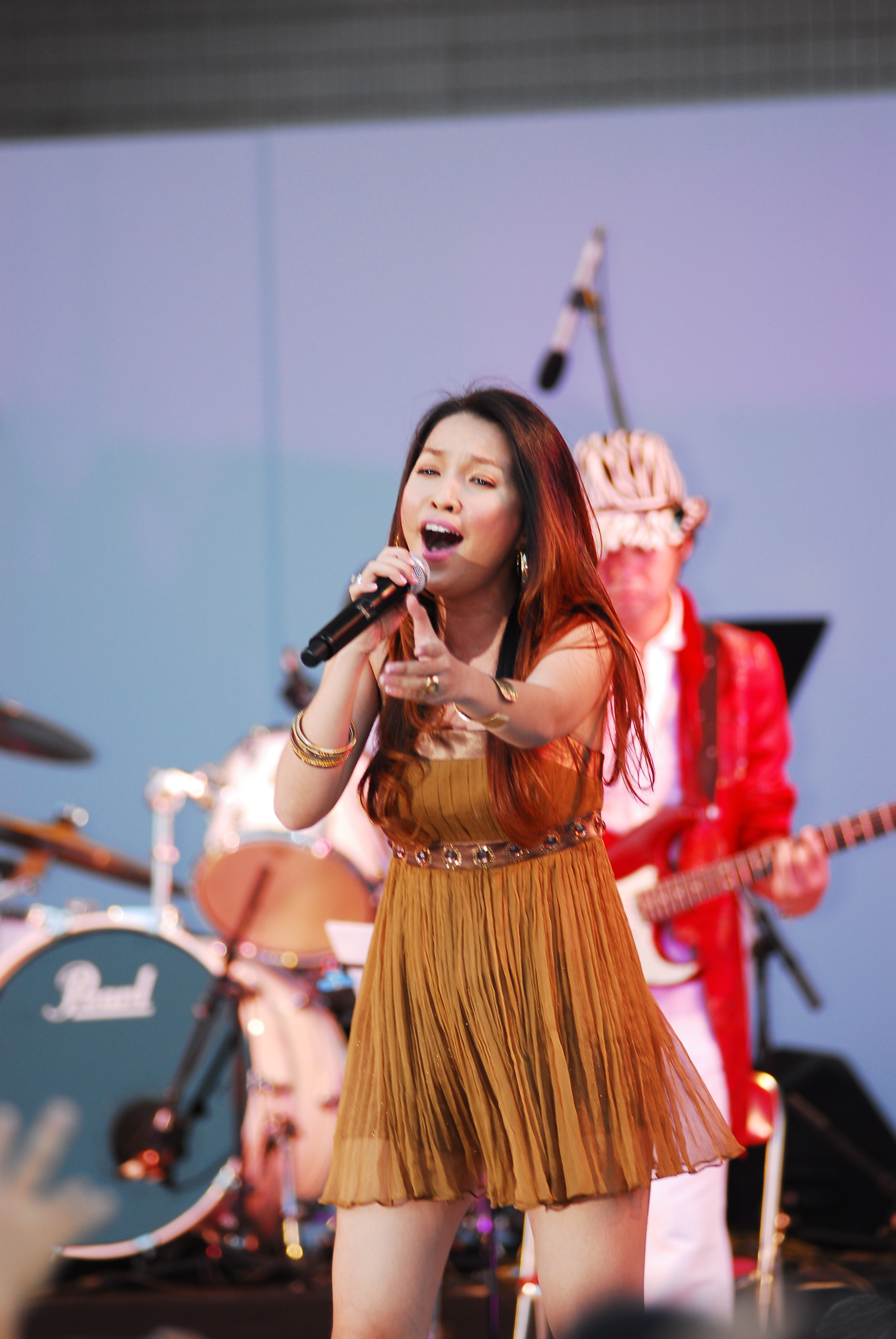
- Hien Thuc Vietnam Festival 2008 in Japan

Background information
- Born: Nguyễn Thị Hiền Thục; 13 May 1981 (age 45); Ho Chi Minh City, Vietnam
- Origin: Vietnam
- Genre: Pop
- Occupation: Singer
- Instruments: Singing

Nguyễn Thị Hiền Thục (born 13 May 1981) is a contemporary Vietnamese pop singer. She took a break from her music career to start a family from 2002 to 2004. She is known to have diverse styles, which are mostly pop, as well as being famous for several ballad songs.

== Career ==
In 2004, she officially returned with the album Vol. 2 - Kim, which was not a hit. The rock alternative song Mot Ngay Ta Xa Nhau of the album Kim was quite well liked later and it was still performed by her. The failure of this album encouraged her to produce more products. In next two years, a series of albums based on five elements such as Bao (Thuy), Q (Tho), Hoa and Moc were released. In 2005, she released the single Dau Co Loi Lam which was composed by Ho Hoai Anh. This was her hit and it was charted in some music charts. Her name started to be mentioned again alongside the song rather than the curiosity of her personal life previously.

With five elements project, she proved herself to be an enthusiastic singer with the acoustic album Moc which received positive feedback from the audience and professionals. The album consisted ballad songs which won Golden Album award of December 2006 and another Golden Album award of 2007 and 1,000 copies was sold.

In 2007, she started the project named Diamond which was still the same style as Moc and new experience in remixing. Diamond included ballad songs from composers like Bao Chan, Ngoc Chau, Tran Thanh Son, Tang Nhat Tue, which was rated to be a successful mix of art and entertainment. As world music became more familiar, all the songs were added folk music and mixed in ambient style to expand the depth of music space. The album produced no hit song.

Her voice during this period of time was deeper rather than her old innocent voice previously.

In May 2009, she released the album Portrait 17 which included songs of late songwriter Trinh Cong Son. The name of album was from the portrait which was drawn by the late songwriter himself as a gift to Hien Thuc at the age of 17. She was motivated to produce Trinh's music when the song Con Tuoi Nao Cho Em in Moc album was highly complimented. Portrait 17 was also a gift for her mother who is a fan of Trinh Cong Son. The CD consisted pop, funk, semi-classical remixed songs rather than the basic style of Trinh Cong Son's song. Con Tuoi Nao Cho Em was directly taken from the previous album Moc, one third of the songs on the album were acoustic. With sweet and bright singing style and young spirit, she was well rated by the professionals and audience. The album won Golden Album award of June 2009.

She used to be starred in two TV dramas O Tro Trong Nha Minh and Lay Vo Sai Gon and also a host of Bai Hat Viet show.

In 2010, ballad album Taurus targeted at young audience received Favorite Album award of Green Wave Award. This was the first time she appeared in the list of Top 10 Favorite Singers of Green Wave Award. Although she had been working for years and had some success, but continued to fail at Potential Artist category since 2005.

From 2010 and furthermore, her name was tied with a series of pop songs such as Mo Mot Hanh Phuc, Nhu Van Con Day, Giac Mo Ngay Xua, Yeu Dau Theo Gio Bay, Dieu Em Lo So,...

She doesn't pursue only one music genre as she wanted to achieve multi-genre singer. She was one of the singers who could balance art and entertainment.

In 2012, she successfully performed the song Nhật ký của mẹ from young composer Nguyen Van Chung. The music video which was portrayed by sand animation of Nguyen Van Chung himself and most lyrics was like from the diary of the mother-to-be until her child grows up drew attention and views on social media, and gained sympathy from the listeners. The song was nominated for Song of The Year award at some music awards, while received Favorite Song award of July of Bai Hat Yeu Thich 2012. Nhật ký của mẹ became a known song about familial love.

In June 2013, she was the coach of The Voice Kid Vietnam first season on VTV3 channel in cooperation with Cat Tien Sa Agency.

On March 1, 2014, she held first ever live show of her career after 25 years as this was a part of Dấu Ấn concert produced by VTV in cooperate with Thanh Nien Media. This show also witnessed a mass audience to compare with previous live show. Due to the shows limited time, it barely portrayed her 25-year career but the crew showed symbols of it through the presentation of some songs based on some genres. Besides music, the live show also addressed her love and relationship with family, teachers, friends, colleagues and her members from The Voice Kid Vietnam.

== Personal life ==
In 2002, as her career was progressing, she suddenly announced her upcoming marriage with Tuấn Thăng, the leader and drummer of famous Sai Gon Boys band in the 1990s after a two-year relationship. He was also the manager and editor of her first CD. The wedding was cancelled.

Also in the same year, she temporarily stopped working to give birth at the age of 21. This was difficult for her family as her father suffered a stroke and was hospitalized.

Subsequently, she gave birth to her named Gia Bao. At first, she was allowed to visit the father's family but it ended as Hiền Thục said that "their care was not genuine, so I stopped letting her visit them, also not wanting her to ever meet them again". Subsequently, they performed together on special musical events starting in 2009.

She was the first single mother singer in Vietnam. In 2005, thank to the encouragement from Phương Thanh, she agreed to an interview to discuss her daughter. According to her, this event "opened a new chapter of my life".

== Conflict with singer Thanh Thảo ==
During first years of the comeback, besides personal life's issues, she faced many musical copyright issues. For instance, regarding two songs Co Don Minh Em and Khuc Tinh Sau with singer Thanh Thảo. The conflict was officially clarified as her manager at that time - Trinh Tu Trung accused Thanh Thao for exclusively buying the copyright of two songs while she had finished recording them and was about to release the album. This put her into financial crisis.

According to the only statement from Thanh Thảo in which she denied it, as she said that whether it was right or wrong, the composer of these songs - Phuong Uyen should be the one who clarified. When Hien Thuc announced the release of Co Don Minh Em also caused Thanh Thao some problems but she let it pass. Thanh Thao also stated that anyone can perform this song as long as they asked for permission, however Hien Thuc didn't.

In 2009, Hien Thuc performed in the live show of Han Thai Tu which was produced by Music Box Agency of Thanh Thao. However, their relationship was still not friendly. In 2011, Thanh Thao invited her to perform at the show Ngan Sao Hoi Tu and their relationship has been better ever since.
