= Thanh Tùng =

Vietnamese composer

Thanh Tùng (15 September 1948 – 15 March 2016) was a Vietnamese pop music composer and songwriter. He was born in Nha Trang, Khánh Hòa, but moved to Hanoi at age 6.

Thanh Tùng graduated from the Pyongyang Conservatory in 1971 and worked for Voice of Vietnam from 1971 to 1975. After the reunification of Vietnam in 1975, he returned to Saigon, now Ho Chi Minh City, and contributed to the establishment of Ho Chi Minh City Television's orchestra. He also worked as conductor and art manager of Bông Sen (Lotus) music company. He worked for Ho Chi Minh City Association of Musicians.

Thanh Tùng composed his first pop song, "Cây sầu riêng trổ bông", in 1975. Since then, he has written over 200 songs. His songs are very popular among Vietnamese young people, for example "Hát với chú ve con", "Hoàng hôn màu lá", "Chuyện tình của biển", "Lời tỏ tình của mùa xuân", "Ngôi sao cô đơn", "Câu chuyện nhỏ của tôi", "Hoa tím ngoài sân", "Em và tôi", "Phố biển", "Mưa ngâu", "Lối cũ ta về". The song "Một mình" has a chorus which resembles that of a Russian folk song.

Tùng was also a businessman, who had interests in mineral water, the restaurant and hotel businesses, and real estate. He owned a discotheque and opened a restaurant called The Twins in July 1998 in Ho Chi Minh City. He died on 15 March 2016 at the age of 67.
