= Dancing with the Stars Vietnam season 4 =

Dancing with the Stars Vietnam
- Season 4
- Starring: see below
- No. of episodes: 10

Release
- Original network: VTV3
- Original release: March 23 – May 25, 2013

Season chronology
- ← Previous; Season 3

Bước nhảy hoàn vũ 2013 was the fourth season of Bước nhảy hoàn vũ produced by Vietnam Television and Cat Tien Sa Productions based upon the BBC Worldwide's Dancing with the Stars. The judges were Khánh Thi, Lê Hoàng and Trần Ly Ly. Each week they were joined by a guest judge.

== Couples ==
Celebrity	Occupation	Professional partner	Status
Ngọc Tình	Model	Mihaela Pavlova	Eliminated 1st on April 6, 2013
Trương Thế Vinh	Singer	Ina Chokova	Eliminated 2nd on April 13, 2013
Maya	Singer and actress	Kristian Yordanov	Eliminated 3rd on April 20, 2013
Hòa Hiệp	Actor	Vesela Dimova	Eliminated 4th on April 27, 2013
Bảo Anh	Singer	Atanas Malamov	Eliminated 5th on May 4, 2013
Hồ Vĩnh Khoa	Actor	Anna Sildova	Eliminated 6th on May 11, 2013
Ngọc Quyên	Model	Daniel Denev	Eliminated 7th on May 18, 2013
Lan Phương	Actress	Valeri Ivanov	Third place on May 25, 2013
Ngô Kiến Huy	Singer	Victoria Gencheva	Runner-up on May 25, 2013
Yến Trang	Singer	Tihomir Gavrilov	Winner on May 25, 2013

== Scores ==
Couple	Place	1	2	3	1+2+3	4	5	6	7	8	9	10
Yến Trang & Tihomir	1	26	36	36	98	31	36	36	37+5=42	–	36+35=71	38+39=77
Kiến Huy & Victoria	2	23	31	33	87	37	38	39	36+6=42	36+36=72	34+35=69	37+36=73
Lan Phương & Valeri	3	29	32	35	96	34	36	35	34+4=38	36+36=72	36+39=75	36+40=76
Ngọc Quyên & Daniel	4	23	35	33	91	36	33	33	32+2=34	38+36=74	34+34=68	
Vĩnh Khoa & Anna	5	25	35	31	91	35	33	35	34+3=37	33+32=65		
Bảo Anh & Atanas	6	25	31	32	88	32	35	34	32+1=33			
Hòa Hiệp & Vesela	7	25	31	31	87	30	30	31				
Maya & Kristian	8	25	31	37	93	32	30					
Thế Vinh & Ina	9	23	34	32	89	30						
Ngọc Tình & Mihaela	10	22	31	32	85							

Red numbers indicate the lowest score for each week.
Green numbers indicate the highest score for each week.
indicates the couple eliminated that week.
indicates the returning couple that finished in the bottom two.
indicates the winning couple (the couple that received the highest combined total of judges' scores and viewers' votes).
indicates the runner-up couple.
indicates the third-place couple.
indicates the couple that won the previous episode and gained immunity for the week.

== Averages ==
This table only counts dances scored on the traditional 40-points scale. Week 1 scores were adjusted to be out of 40.

Rank by average	Place	Couple	Total points	Number of dances	Average
1	3	Lan Phương & Valeri	467.7	13	35.98
2	1	Yến Trang & Tihomir	394.7	11	35.88
3	2	Kiến Huy & Victoria	458.7	13	35.28
4	4	Ngọc Quyên & Daniel	374.7	11	34.06
5	5	Vĩnh Khoa & Anna	301.3	9	33.48
6	6	Bảo Anh & Atanas	229.3	7	32.76
7	8	Maya & Kristian	163.3	5	32.66
8	9	Thế Vinh & Ina	126.7	4	31.68
9	7	Hòa Hiệp & Vesela	186.3	6	31.05
10	10	Ngọc Tình & Mihaela	92.3	3	30.77

== Highest and lowest scoring performances ==
The best and worst performances in each dance according to the judges' marks are as follows:

Dance	Best dancer(s)	Best score	Worst dancer(s)	Worst score
Samba	Yến Trang; Lan Phương	36	Ngọc Tình	29.3
Contemporary	Lan Phương	36	Ngô Kiến Huy	30.7
Rumba	Maya	37	Trương Thế Vinh	30
Modern	Hồ Vĩnh Khoa	33.3	Hồ Vĩnh Khoa	32
American Smooth Waltz	Yến Trang	34.7		
Hip-hop	Hòa Hiệp	33.3		
Paso Doble	Yến Trang	36	Bảo Anh	32
Swing/Broadway	Lan Phương	38.7		
Cha-cha-cha	Ngô Kiến Huy	37	Maya	30
Waltz	Yến Trang	38	Hòa Hiệp	30
Jive	Ngô Kiến Huy	38	Bảo Anh; Ngọc Tình	31
Quickstep	Yến Trang	36	Maya	32
Tango	Ngọc Quyên	36	Trương Thế Vinh	32
Broadway	Ngô Kiến Huy	39	Hòa Hiệp	31
Fusion	Yến Trang	37	Bảo Anh; Ngọc Quyên	32
Swing Marathon	Ngô Kiến Huy	6	Bảo Anh	1
Argentine Tango	Ngọc Quyên	38	Hồ Vĩnh Khoa	33
Trio Dance	Lan Phương; Ngọc Quyên; Ngô Kiến Huy	36	Hồ Vĩnh Khoa	32
Freestyle	Lan Phương	40	Ngô Kiến Huy	36

== Couples' Highest and Lowest Scoring Dances ==
According to the traditional 40-point scale:

Couples	Highest Scoring Dance(s)	Score	Lowest Scoring Dance(s)	Score
Yến Trang & Tihomir	Freestyle	39	Rumba	31
Kiến Huy & Victoria	Broadway	39	Contemporary	30.7
Lan Phương & Valeri	Freestyle	40	Cha-cha-cha	32
Ngọc Quyên & Daniel	Argentine Tango	38	Rumba	30.7
Vĩnh Khoa & Anna	Quickstep, Tango & Broadway	35	Rumba	31
Bảo Anh & Atanas	Samba	35	Jive	31
Hòa Hiệp & Vesela	Hip-hop	33.3	Waltz & Samba	30
Maya & Kristian	Rumba	37	Cha-cha-cha	30
Thế Vinh & Ina	Cha-cha-cha	34	Rumba	30
Ngọc Tình & Mihaela	Rumba	32	Samba	29.3

== Songs and Individual Scoring ==
Unless indicated otherwise, individual judges scores in the charts below (given in parentheses) are listed in this order from left to right: Guest judge, Trần Ly Ly, Lê Hoàng, Khánh Thi.

=== Week 1 ===
Individual judges scores in the charts below (given in parentheses) are listed in this order from left to right: Trần Ly Ly, Lê Hoàng, Khánh Thi.

Running order

Couple	Score	Dance	Music	Ranking points		
Couple	Score	Dance	Music	Judges	Audience	Total
Thế Vinh & Ina	23 (8,7,8)	Samba	"Tarzan Boy" — Baltimora "Coco Jamboo" – Mr. President	4	3	7
Bảo Anh & Atanas	25 (9,8,8)	Contemporary	"Words" — Skylar Grey	8	10	18
Ngọc Quyên & Daniel	23 (8,7,8)	Kung fu Rumba	"Chờ người nơi ấy" – Uyen Linh	4	5	9
Kiến Huy & Victoria	23 (8,7,8)	Freestyle	"I Will Always Love You" — Dolly Parton	4	7	11
Vĩnh Khoa & Anna	25 (9,8,8)	Freestyle	"Harlem Shake" – Baauer "Run the World (Girls)" – Beyoncé	8	8	16
Yến Trang & Tihomir	26 (10,8,8)	American Smooth Waltz	"Tình ca phố" – Đức Tuấn	9	4	13
Ngọc Tình & Mihaela	22 (7,7,8)	Samba	"I Like to Move It" – Reel 2 Real	1	1	2
Hòa Hiệp & Vesela	25 (9,8,8)	Hip-hop	"Thiên đàng búp bê" — Ca nhạc thiếu nhi "Low" — Flo Rida	8	6	14
Maya & Kristian	25 (9,8,8)	Paso Doble	"España cañí" — Pascual Marquina Narro	8	2	10
Lan Phương & Valeri	29 (10,10,9)	Swing/Broadway	"Diamonds Are a Girl's Best Friend" — Marilyn Monroe	10	9	19

=== Week 2 ===
- Guest judge: Cao Thị Đoan Trang, singer, season 1 runner-up and former co-host.

Individual judges scores in the charts below (given in parentheses) are listed in this order from left to right: Cao Thị Đoan Trang, Trần Ly Ly, Lê Hoàng, Khánh Thi.

Running order

Couple	Score	Dance	Music	Ranking points		
Couple	Score	Dance	Music	Judges	Audience	Total
Lan Phương & Valeri	32 (8,8,8,8)	Cha-cha-cha	"GoldenEye" — Tina Turner	6	5	11
Kiến Huy & Victoria	31 (8,8,7,8)	Waltz	"Rilassamento" – Gianni Pavesi	5	9	14
Bảo Anh & Atanas	31 (8,8,8,7)	Jive	"Dirty Dancer" – Enrique Iglesias with Usher featuring Lil Wayne	5	4	9
Vĩnh Khoa & Anna	35 (9,9,8,9)	Quickstep	"Show Me How You Burlesque" — Christina Aguilera	9	8	17
Thế Vinh & Ina	34 (9,9,8,8)	Cha-cha-cha	"I Need to Know" – Marc Anthony	7	6	13
Maya & Kristian	31 (9,8,7,7)	Waltz	"Don't Close Your Eyes" – Keith Whitley	5	2	7
Ngọc Tình & Mihaela	31 (8,8,7,8)	Jive	"Candyman" – Christina Aguilera	5	1	6
Ngọc Quyên & Daniel	35 (9,8,9,9)	Waltz	"My Heart Will Go On" – Celine Dion	9	10	19
Hòa Hiệp & Vesela	31 (8,8,7,8)	Cha-cha-cha	"Unchain My Heart" – Ray Charles	5	3	8
Yến Trang & Tihomir	36 (10,9,8,9)	Quickstep	"Vive Le Swing" – In-Grid	10	7	17

=== Week 3 ===
- Guest judge: Trần Thị Thủy Tiên, singer, season 2 runner-up.

Individual judges scores in the charts below (given in parentheses) are listed in this order from left to right: Trần Thị Thủy Tiên, Trần Ly Ly, Lê Hoàng, Khánh Thi.

Running order

Couple	Score	Dance	Music	Ranking points			Result
Couple	Score	Dance	Music	Judges	Audience	Total	Result
Yến Trang & Tihomir	36 (10,9,8,9)	Paso Doble	"Diamonds" — Rihanna	9	6	15	Safe
Hòa Hiệp & Vesela	31 (8,8,7,8)	Rumba	"Tender Heart" – Lionel Richie	2	3	5	Safe
Thế Vinh & Ina	32 (8,8,8,8)	Tango	"Beat It" – Michael Jackson	5	1	6	Bottom two
Bảo Anh & Atanas	32 (9,8,8,7)	Paso Doble	"Unstoppable" — E.S. Posthumus	5	7	12	Safe
Ngọc Tình & Mihaela	32 (9,8,7,8)	Rumba	"I Don't Want to Miss a Thing" — Aerosmith	5	4	9	Eliminated
Kiến Huy & Victoria	33 (9,8,8,8)	Tango	"Nobody" – Wonder Girls	7	9	16	Safe
Ngọc Quyên & Daniel	33 (9,8,9,7)	Paso Doble	"Air" – Hans Zimmer	7	5	12	Safe
Vĩnh Khoa & Anna	31 (8,8,7,8)	Rumba	"Remember" – James Horner	2	2	4	Safe
Lan Phương & Valeri	35 (9,8,9,9)	Tango	"Santa Maria" – Gotan Project	8	8	16	Safe
Maya & Kristian	37 (10,9,10,8)	Rumba	"Feelings" – Morris Albert	10	10	20	Safe

=== Week 4: Opponents' Choice Week ===
- Guest judge: Lê Ngọc Minh Hằng, singer and actress, season 3 champion.

Individual judges scores in the charts below (given in parentheses) are listed in this order from left to right: Lê Ngọc Minh Hằng, Trần Ly Ly, Lê Hoàng, Khánh Thi.

Running order

Couple	Score	Dance	Music	Dance chosen by	Ranking points			Result
Couple	Score	Dance	Music	Dance chosen by	Judges	Audience	Total	Result
Bảo Anh & Atanas	32 (9,8,7,8)	Waltz	"Where Do Broken Hearts Go" – Whitney Houston	Thế Vinh & Ina	5	4	9	Safe
Lan Phương & Valeri	34 (9,8,9,8)	Rumba	"Fields of Gold" – Sting	Maya & Kristian	6	9	15	Safe
Maya & Kristian	32 (8,8,8,8)	Quickstep	"Tu Vuò Fà L'Americano" — Renato Carosone	Hòa Hiệp & Vesela	5	5	10	Safe
Thế Vinh & Ina	30 (8,8,7,7)	Rumba	"Hold Me" – Ebba Forsberg	Lan Phương & Valeri	2	1	3	Eliminated
Hòa Hiệp & Vesela	30 (8,7,8,7)	Waltz	"Dreamcatcher" – Secret Garden	Yến Trang & Tihomir	2	6	8	Safe
Yến Trang & Tihomir	31 (8,8,7,8)	Rumba	"Historia de un Amor" – Carlos Eleta Almarán	Vĩnh Khoa & Anna	3	3	6	Bottom two
Ngọc Quyên & Daniel	36 (9,9,9,9)	Tango	"Alcoba Azul" – Lila Downs	Bảo Anh & Atanas	8	8	16	Safe
Kiến Huy & Victoria	37 (9,10,9,9)	Cha-cha-cha	"Hush Hush; Hush Hush" – The Pussycat Dolls	Ngọc Quyên & Daniel	9	7	16	Safe
Vĩnh Khoa & Anna	35 (9,9,8,9)	Tango	"Libertango" – Ástor Piazzolla	Kiến Huy & Victoria	7	2	9	Safe

=== Week 5: Folk Week ===
- Guest judge: Cao Thị Đoan Trang, singer, season 1 runner-up and former co-host.

Individual judges scores in the charts below (given in parentheses) are listed in this order from left to right: Cao Thị Đoan Trang, Trần Ly Ly, Lê Hoàng, Khánh Thi.

Running order

Couple	Score	Dance	Music	Ranking points			Result
Couple	Score	Dance	Music	Judges	Audience	Total	Result
Hòa Hiệp & Vesela	30 (8,7,7,8)	Indian style Samba	"Made in India" – Alisha Chinai	2	7	9	Safe
Ngọc Quyên & Daniel	33 (9,8,8,8)	Bulgarian style Cha-cha-cha	"Water" – Elitsa Todorova & Stoyan Yankoulov	4	2	6	Bottom two
Bảo Anh & Atanas	35 (9,9,9,8)	African style Samba	"Lo Lo Dzama" – Šum Svistu	5	4	9	Safe
Maya & Kristian	30 (8,7,8,7)	Cuban style Cha-cha-cha	"Ay Mi Cuba" – Celia Cruz & Johnny Pacheco	2	1	3	Eliminated
Vĩnh Khoa & Anna	33 (9,8,7,9)	Spanish style Paso Doble	"Malagueña" — Brian Setzer	4	3	7	Safe
Kiến Huy & Victoria	38 (10,9,9,10)	Vietnamese style Jive	"Trống cơm" – traditional	8	8	16	Safe
Lan Phương & Valeri	36 (9,9,9,9)	American style Jive	"Red Solo Cup" – Toby Keith	7	5	12	Safe
Yến Trang & Tihomir	36 (10,9,8,9)	Brazilian style Samba	"It's Time for Carnival" – Ipanema	7	6	13	Safe

=== Week 6: Broadway Week ===
- Guest judge: Trương Nam Thành, model, season 3 runner-up.

Individual judges scores in the charts below (given in parentheses) are listed in this order from left to right: Trương Nam Thành, Trần Ly Ly, Lê Hoàng, Khánh Thi.

Running order

Couple	Score	Dance	Music	Ranking points			Result
Couple	Score	Dance	Music	Judges	Audience	Total	Result
Ngọc Quyên & Daniel	33 (9,8,8,8)	Broadway	"Be Italian" — from Nine	2	5	7	Safe
Lan Phương & Valeri	35 (10,9,8,8)	Broadway	"Cell Block Tango" – from Chicago	5	2	7	Bottom two
Hòa Hiệp & Vesela	31 (8,8,7,8)	Broadway	"Sparkling Diamonds"/"Diamonds Are a Girl's Best Friend"/"Material Girl" – from Moulin Rouge!	1	1	2	Eliminated
Yến Trang & Tihomir	36 (10,9,8,9)	Broadway	"Shakalaka Baby"/"Chaiyya Chaiyya" – from Bombay Dreams	6	3	9	Safe
Vĩnh Khoa & Anna	35 (9,9,8,9)	Broadway	"Me and My Baby" – from Chicago	5	4	9	Safe
Bảo Anh & Atanas	34 (9,8,9,8)	Broadway	"I Am a Good Girl" – from Burlesque	3	7	10	Safe
Kiến Huy & Victoria	39 (10,9,10,10)	Broadway	"Step in Time" – from Mary Poppins	7	6	13	Safe

=== Week 7: Fusion Week ===
- Guest judge: Việt Tú, director.
- Note: The couple who earns the highest combined total of judges' scores and viewers' votes this week will gain immunity for the next week and will go straight through to the semi-finals.

Individual judges scores in the charts below (given in parentheses) are listed in this order from left to right: Việt Tú, Trần Ly Ly, Lê Hoàng, Khánh Thi.

Running order

Couple	Score	Dance(s)	Music	Ranking points			Result
Couple	Score	Dance(s)	Music	Judges	Audience	Total	Result
Kiến Huy & Victoria	36 (9,9,9,9)	Cha-cha-cha; Paso Doble	"Toxic" – Britney Spears	6	4	10	Safe
Bảo Anh & Atanas	32 (8,8,8,8)	Tango; Cha-cha-cha	"Scream & Shout" – will.i.am featuring Britney Spears	1	1	2	Eliminated
Yến Trang & Tihomir	37 (9,9,9,10)	Tango; Paso Doble	"Tanguera" — Mariano Mores	6	6	12	Safe
Vĩnh Khoa & Anna	34 (9,8,8,9)	Tango; Cha-cha-cha	"Die Young" — Ke$ha	3	3	6	Safe
Ngọc Quyên & Daniel	32 (8,8,8,8)	Foxtrot; Cha-cha-cha	"Theme from New York, New York" – Frank Sinatra	2	2	4	Bottom two
Lan Phương & Valeri	34 (8,9,9,8)	Quickstep; Samba	"Jazz Machine" – Black Machine	4	5	9	Safe
Bảo Anh & Atanas; N. Quyên & Daniel; Vĩnh Khoa & Anna; Lan Phương & Valeri; Yến Trang & Tihomir; Kiến Huy & Victoria	1; 2; 3; 4; 5; 6	Swing Marathon	"Blue Suede Shoes" – Elvis Presley				

=== Week 8: Trio Challenge Week ===
- Guest judge: Trần Thị Thủy Tiên, singer, season 2 runner-up.
- Note: Yến Trang & Tihomir, who earned the highest combined total of judges' scores and viewers' votes last week, are immune this week. Their dances this week will not be scored and the audience will not be able to vote for them. They will go straight through to next week.

Individual judges scores in the charts below (given in parentheses) are listed in this order from left to right: Trần Thị Thủy Tiên, Trần Ly Ly, Lê Hoàng, Khánh Thi.

Running order

Couple	Trio Dance Partner	Score	Dance(s)	Music	Ranking points			Result
Couple	Trio Dance Partner	Score	Dance(s)	Music	Judges	Audience	Total	Result
Yến Trang & Tihomir	Ina Chokova	N/A	Argentine Tango	"Bust Your Windows" — Jazmine Sullivan	—N/a	—N/a	—N/a	Immunity
Yến Trang & Tihomir	Ina Chokova	N/A	Cha-cha-cha; Modern	"Gentleman"/"Gangnam Style" – Psy	—N/a	—N/a	—N/a	Immunity
Vĩnh Khoa & Anna	Atanas Malamov	33 (8,8,8,9)	Argentine Tango	"Así Se Baila El Tango" — Veronica Verdier	1	1	2	Eliminated
Vĩnh Khoa & Anna	Atanas Malamov	32 (8,8,8,8)	Modern	"Let's Step Up" – After School	1	1	2	Eliminated
Lan Phương & Valeri	Mihaela Pavlova	36 (9,9,9,9)	Argentine Tango	"Whatever Lola Wants" — Sarah Vaughan	3	2	5	Bottom two
Lan Phương & Valeri	Mihaela Pavlova	36 (9,9,8,10)	Contemporary	"Heart Cry" – Drehz	3	2	5	Bottom two
Ngọc Quyên & Daniel	Kristian Yordanov	38 (10,9,9,10)	Argentine Tango	"Tanguera" — Mariano Mores	4	4	8	Safe
Ngọc Quyên & Daniel	Kristian Yordanov	36 (10,9,8,9)	Rumba	"When You Tell Me That You Love Me" – Diana Ross	4	4	8	Safe
Kiến Huy & Victoria	Vesela Midova	36 (9,9,8,10)	Argentine Tango	"In-Tango" – In-Grid	3	3	6	Safe
Kiến Huy & Victoria	Vesela Midova	36 (9,9,9,9)	Freestyle	"Super Bass" – Nicki Minaj	3	3	6	Safe

=== Week 9: Semi-Finals ===
- Guest judge: Lê Ngọc Minh Hằng, singer and actress, season 3 champion.

Individual judges scores in the charts below (given in parentheses) are listed in this order from left to right: Lê Ngọc Minh Hằng, Trần Ly Ly, Lê Hoàng, Khánh Thi.

Running order

Couple	Score	Dance(s)	Music	Ranking points			Result
Couple	Score	Dance(s)	Music	Judges	Audience	Total	Result
Ngọc Quyên & Daniel	34 (8,9,9,8)	Samba	"Hip Hip Chin Chin" — Club des Belugas	1	1	2	Eliminated
Ngọc Quyên & Daniel	34 (9,8,8,9)	Tango; Paso Doble	"Bad" — Michael Jackson	1	1	2	Eliminated
Lan Phương & Valeri	36 (9,9,9,9)	Samba	"Cinema Italiano" – Kate Hudson	4	3	7	Safe
Lan Phương & Valeri	39 (10,10,9,10)	Freestyle	"Earth Song" — Michael Jackson	4	3	7	Safe
Kiến Huy & Victoria	34 (9,8,8,9)	Samba	"Mario Song"	2	2	4	Bottom two
Kiến Huy & Victoria	35 (9,9,8,9)	Cha-cha-cha; Freestyle	"Dangerous"/"Smooth Criminal" – Michael Jackson	2	2	4	Bottom two
Yến Trang & Tihomir	36 (10,9,8,9)	Samba	"Beautiful Liar" – Beyoncé and Shakira	3	4	7	Safe
Yến Trang & Tihomir	35 (9,9,8,9)	Cha-cha-cha; Paso Doble	"They Don't Care About Us"/"Smooth Criminal" – Michael Jackson	3	4	7	Safe

=== Week 10: Finals ===
- Guest judge: Cao Thị Đoan Trang, singer, season 1 runner-up and former co-host.

Individual judges scores in the charts below (given in parentheses) are listed in this order from left to right: Cao Thị Đoan Trang, Trần Ly Ly, Lê Hoàng, Khánh Thi.

Running order

Couple	Score	Dance	Music	Ranking points			Result
Couple	Score	Dance	Music	Judges	Audience	Total	Result
Lan Phương & Valeri	36 (8,10,8,10)	Rumba	"Wish You Were Here" – Bliss	2	1	3	Third place
Lan Phương & Valeri	40 (10,10,10,10)	Freestyle	"Cuppy Cake"/"A New Day Has Come – Céline Dion/"You Raise Me Up" – Secret Garden	2	1	3	Third place
Kiến Huy & Victoria	37 (9,9,9,10)	Jive	"60 Năm Cuộc Đời" – Y Vân	1	2	3	Runner-up
Kiến Huy & Victoria	36 (9,9,9,9)	Freestyle	"Firework" – Katy Perry	1	2	3	Runner-up
Yến Trang & Tihomir	38 (10,10,9,9)	Waltz	"Biết ơn chị Võ Thị Sáu" – Nguyễn Đức Toàn	3	3	6	Winner
Yến Trang & Tihomir	39 (10,10,9,10)	Freestyle	"Matsuri" – Kitarō	3	3	6	Winner

Other performances

Couple	Dance	Music
Ngọc Tình & Mihaela	Rumba	"Santa Maria" – Gotan Project
Hòa Hiệp & Vesela	Jive	"Hit the Road Jack" — Ray Charles
Maya & Kristian	Rumba	"Nếu Biết Trước" – Tâm Đoan
Thế Vinh & Ina	Paso Doble	"The Puss Suite" – Henry Pryce Jackman
Bảo Anh & Atanas	Hip-hop	"Barbie Girl" — Aqua"/"Rude Boy" – Rihanna"/"Crazy In Love"—Beyoncé
Vĩnh Khoa & Anna	Hip-hop/Rumba	"Tình Về Nơi Đâu" – Thanh Bùi featuring Tata Young
Ngọc Quyên & Daniel	Waltz	"Come Away with Me" – Norah Jones

== Dance chart ==
The celebrities and professional partners danced one of these routines for each corresponding week:

- Week 1: One unlearned dance
- Week 2: Cha-cha-cha or Waltz or Jive or Quickstep
- Week 3: Paso Doble or Rumba or Tango
- Week 4: One unlearned dance from week 2 or 3 (Opponents' Choice Week)
- Week 5: One unlearned Latin dance with elements of a folk dance
- Week 6: Broadway dance
- Week 7: One dance of two combined styles (Fusion) and Swing marathon
- Week 8: Argentine Tango and a Trio dance
- Week 9: Samba and a Fusion or Freestyle dance to Michael Jackson's music
- Week 10: Judges' choice dance and Freestyle

Couple	1	2	3	4	5	6	7		8		9		10	
Yến Trang & Tihomir	American Smooth Waltz	Quickstep	Paso Doble	Rumba	Brazilian style Samba	Broadway	Tango; Paso Doble	Swing	Argentine Tango	Cha-cha-cha; Modern	Samba	Cha-cha-cha; Paso Doble	Waltz	Freestyle
Kiến Huy & Victoria	Contemporary	Waltz	Tango	Cha-cha-cha	Vietnamese style Jive	Broadway	Cha-cha-cha; Paso Doble	Swing	Argentine Tango	Freestyle	Samba	Cha-cha-cha; Freestyle	Jive	Freestyle
Lan Phương & Valeri	Swing/Broadway	Cha-cha-cha	Tango	Rumba	American style Jive	Broadway	Quickstep; Samba	Swing	Argentine Tango	Contemporary	Samba	Freestyle	Rumba	Freestyle
Ngọc Quyên & Daniel	Kung fu Rumba	Waltz	Paso Doble	Tango	Bulgarian style Cha-cha-cha	Broadway	Foxtrot; Cha-cha-cha	Swing	Argentine Tango	Rumba	Samba	Tango; Paso Doble		Waltz
Vĩnh Khoa & Anna	Modern	Quickstep	Rumba	Tango	Spanish style Paso Doble	Broadway	Tango; Cha-cha-cha	Swing	Argentine Tango	Modern				Hip-hop/Rumba
Bảo Anh & Atanas	Contemporary	Jive	Paso Doble	Waltz	African style Samba	Broadway	Tango; Cha-cha-cha	Swing						Hip-hop
Hòa Hiệp & Vesela	Hip-hop	Cha-cha-cha	Rumba	Waltz	Indian style Samba	Broadway								Jive
Maya & Kristian	Paso Doble	Waltz	Rumba	Quickstep	Cuban style Cha-cha-cha									Rumba
Thế Vinh & Ina	Samba	Cha-cha-cha	Tango	Rumba										Paso Doble
Ngọc Tình & Mihaela	Samba	Jive	Rumba											Rumba

Highest scoring dance
Lowest scoring dance
Danced, but not scored
