= Lang Chánh district =

Coordinates: 20.167°N 105.167°E

Lang Chánh district Huyện Lang Chánh
- District
- Interactive map of Lang Chánh district
- Country: Vietnam
- Region: North Central Coast
- Province: Thanh Hóa
- Capital: Lang Chánh

Area
  - Total: 226 sq mi (586 km^{2})

Population (2018)
  - Total: 50,120
- Time zone: UTC+7 (UTC + 7)

Lang Chánh is a district (huyện) of Thanh Hóa province in the North Central Coast region of Vietnam.

As of 2003 the district had a population of 43,913. The district covers an area of 586 km^{2} (226 sq mi). The district capital lies at Lang Chánh.
