= Lost in Paradise (film) =

- Directed by: Vũ Ngọc Đãng
- Screenplay by: Vũ Ngọc Đãng; Lương Mạnh Hải
- Starring: Lương Mạnh Hải; Hồ Vĩnh Khoa; Linh Sơn; Phương Thanh; Hiếu Hiền
- Production company: BHD
- Distributed by: Vietnam Media Corp. Fortissimo Films (international)
- Release date: 14 October 2011
- Running time: 103 minutes
- Country: Vietnam
- Language: Vietnamese
- Box office: c. $1,000,000

Lost in Paradise is a 2011 Vietnamese drama film directed by Vũ Ngọc Đãng. Its original title is Rebellious Hot Boy and the Story of Cười, the Prostitute and the Duck (Hot boy nổi loạn và câu chuyện về thằng Cười, cô gái điếm và con vịt), shortened to Rebellious Hot Boy (Hot boy nổi loạn) or simply Hot Boy. The film is set in Ho Chi Minh City and has two separate story lines. The first depicts a love triangle between three men, Khôi, Lam, and Đông, amidst a backdrop of male prostitution. The second concerns a mentally handicapped man, Cười, his friendship with Hạnh, a female prostitute, and his attempts to raise a duckling. The film was a strong critical and commercial success in Vietnam. It has been shown at several international festivals, from which it garnered more mixed reviews. In particular its portrayal of homosexuality has been noted as ground breaking within the context of Vietnamese cinema.

== Cast and synopsis ==
Vũ Ngọc Đãng directed and co-wrote Lost in Paradise. Previous collaborator Lương Mạnh Hải was the second co-writer and starred in the film as Lam. Hồ Vĩnh Khoa played the film's second male lead, Khôi, while Linh Sơn played Lam's antagonist, Đông. Well-known singer Phương Thanh played prostitute Hạnh, while Hiếu Hiền played the mentally handicapped Cười.

Other cast members:-

- La Quoc Hung as Long
- Don Nguyen as Dan em cua Danh

=== Plot ===
The film is set in Saigon, where Khôi arrives from Nha Trang after being disowned by his family on account of his homosexuality. Đông befriends him and invites him to share an apartment along with Lam, who is—unbeknownst to Khôi—actually Đông's lover. At the apartment, Đông and Lam rob him of his money and belongings; Đông in turn abandons Lam and flees with the cash. Lam later happens upon an injured Khôi sleeping rough. In pity he returns the latter's clothes and identity papers and after a tentative reconciliation the two become friends and ultimately lovers. Lam returns to his life as a prostitute while Khôi attempts to work as a bookseller. A returning, manipulative Đông dogs the couple which culminates in Lam wounding his antagonist with a stab to the foot. Khôi eventually leaves Lam because of the latter's work as a prostitute. An increasingly desperate Lam takes to robbing his clients at knife-point; a gang of men in the employ of one such victim kills Lam at the film's climax.

The film's second plot concerns a mentally handicapped man named Cười and his endeavors to raise a duckling, while intermittently attempting to befriend a prostitute, Hạnh. This enrages her pimp who takes to beating both as a deterrent. The initially hostile Hạnh warms to Cười as his duckling grows. At the film's close, the pimp's threat to eat Cười's duck prompts Hạnh to club her and an enforcer to death.

== Release ==
Under the title Lost in Paradise, the film's world premiere was at the Toronto International Film Festival in September 2011, with further showings at the Vancouver International Film Festival, and the Busan International Film Festival. International distribution rights were subsequently acquired by Amsterdam and Hong Kong-based Fortissimo Films, making it the company's first Vietnamese title. The film premiered as Rebellious Hot Boy in Ho Chi Minh City on 12 October 2011, in Hanoi the following day and was released across Vietnam on the 14 October. The film opened the Hong Kong Lesbian and Gay Film Festival in 2011 where it was described as "Vietnam's first gay film" by AFP. It will also be part of the upcoming Vietnam Film Festival.

== Reception ==
AFP called Lost in Paradise "Vietnam's first gay film". The Vancouver International Film Festival explains: "it's the first Vietnamese film to offer a frank account of some aspects of gay life."

VietnamNet noted that Vietnamese films typically denigrate effeminate or transgender people while using them as sources of comedy, while prostitute characters are used for suggestive or provocative purposes; Lost in Paradise places them in the central roles of a love story depicting their predicament. The website noted the themes of alienation and fear amongst homosexuals and the film's humane, intimate and empathetic portrayal. The reviewer felt restless towards the film's end, but praised the ending for releasing the tension and felt the earlier part of the film has a smoother pace. He praised the rich and compelling detail of the main story, as well as the romance and humour of the subplot. VnExpress praised the movie for its positive portrayal of Vietnamese society's elements, its tasteful portrayal of explicit gay sex and overall realism.

In 2010, the film won Thailand's Technicolor Award. The Vancouver International Film Festival's reviewer said the film is "not very sophisticated by international standards" and that the alternative plot "tries the patience". He felt the film's portrayal of gay prostitution was authentic and said “the depiction of relationships is quite hard-edged. And the film makes the most of its good-looking cast.” Ticket sales at the Toronto International Film Festival outstripped those of other Asian movies, including a sold-out screening. Canada's Press+1 felt the main love story was clichéd and somewhat predictable but the emotion "genuine". The writer judged the male leads' acting as middling; he called Hiếu Hiền's acting superb and argued that the film's secondary plot was its best. The writer felt that a positive, gay-themed film from Vietnam was in itself historically important. He praised the realism of the film but would have preferred better interplay between footage of the two story lines. The Georgia Straight said the film "breaks new ground" in its setting and subject matter. The reviewer also felt the second plot "gets cloying" and called aspects of the gay themes "well-trodden". but said "it does keep things realistic when it comes to the hardships of being gay in the city."
