= Hồ Vĩnh Khoa =

Vietnamese actor and model (born 1988)

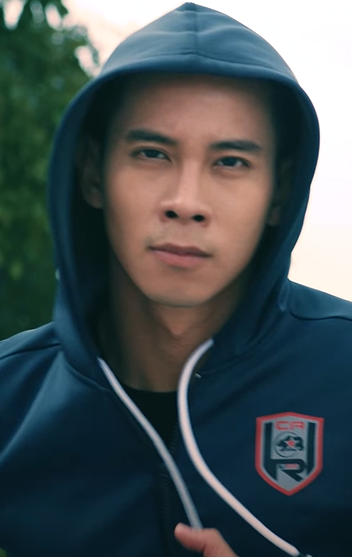
- Khoa in 2017
- Born: Hồ Vĩnh Khoa; 25 October 1988 (age 37); Ho Chi Minh City, Vietnam
- Occupations: Actor; Gay pornographic content creator; model; musician
- Years active: 2006–present
- Notable work: Lost in Paradise (2011)
- Spouse: Rhonee Rojas (m. 2017)

Hồ Vĩnh Khoa (born 25 October 1988) is a Vietnamese actor, model, singer, and gay pornography content creator.

== Early life and career ==
Hồ Vĩnh Khoa was born in October 1988 in Ho Chi Minh City. In 2006, he participated and reached the final stages of a modelling show for teenagers. Due to his photogenic attitude, Vĩnh Khoa became a known face in advertisements of beauty products for youths.

After his father died in 2007, Vĩnh Khoa became closer to his mother, whom he considered to be his only support. Vĩnh Khoa subsequently experienced a breakup with a boyfriend and health problems. In mid-2010, he began pursuing a musical career and dropped out of his studies at the University of Theatre and Cinema Ho Chi Minh City. In 2011, Vĩnh Khoa made his acting debut in the drama film Lost in Paradise. The film was well received by critics, who also highlighted Vĩnh Khoa's acting. Singer Hồng Nhung said that Hồ Vĩnh Khoa's role made her cry out of emotion. He won the Best Supporting Actor award for that role at the 17th Vietnam Film Festival in December 2011. That same year, Vĩnh Khoa also released a V-pop music video recorded with actress Ninh Dương Lan Ngọc.

In 2013, he joined season 4 of dancing contest Bước nhảy hoàn vũ, where he was eliminated before the final rounds. Vĩnh Khoa continued with his acting career and, in 2015, had a role in horror film The Ghost of the Vuong Family, which received negative reviews.

In 2016, Vĩnh Khoa left Vietnam for the United States shortly after photos of his genitalia appeared on his personal Instagram. He quickly deleted the images and claimed that his account had been hacked. Vĩnh Khoa later defended nude photography, saying that it is not true that posing naked means immorality or indecency, adding that there are good and bad people in modelling as in every other profession.

== Personal life ==
Vĩnh Khoa is gay and married his Hawaii-born husband, Rhonee Rojas, in a ceremony on Waikiki, Hawaii, in 2017. Rojas also worked as a model, mainly in Thailand, and is of mixed ancestry, including Filipino, American, Spanish, Chinese, and Thai roots. The couple had met during a visit by Khoa to Hawaii, and Rojas visited him in Vietnam some time later, spending holidays at a private resort in Nha Trang. After living for six years in Hawaii, Khoa and Rojas moved to Las Vegas.

Khoa decided to quit his acting career and pursue other interests with his husband, including travel, hiking, and producing pornographic content which they upload to their OnlyFans and X (formerly Twitter) accounts, also participating in adult films for OnlyFans. He also said that following his role in Lost in Paradise, he received many social media messages from people telling him how much his character and the movie had meant to them, despite homosexuality being a taboo in Vietnam at the time. Khoa further stated that he had always wanted to get married to have a stable life and not fear future unemployment in his acting career. He and his husband have also engaged in charitable work, participating in the construction of a water well for a family in Cambodia in a Shintani Foundation initiative.

He describes himself as a family man with a deep interest in the well-being of his mother, his younger sister, and his partner. Khoa is a vegetarian and a Buddhist, saying that his lifestyle is heavily influenced by Buddhism. He added that he likes to recite Buddhist mantras and prayers.

Khoa alleged that he suffered a lot due to romantic failures and that his depressive feelings while dealing with breakups with his boyfriends affected his mother, saying that he had never caused distress to his mother before that. He added that opening up to new friendships helped him cope with his feelings aside from doing exercise. Khoa stated in March 2015 during a trip to Europe that he made with his mother, that he was seeking to get rid of the label of "hot boy", adding that he no longer wanted to satisfy his teenage fans, instead looking for his true self as a charismatic and edgy guy.

== Awards and nominations ==
Award	Date of ceremony	Category	Work	Result	Ref.
Vietnam Film Festival	17 December 2011	Best Supporting Actor – Feature film	Lost in Paradise	Won	
