= Linh Sơn =

Linh Sơn may refer to several places in Vietnam, including:

- Linh Sơn, Thái Nguyên, a ward of Thái Nguyên Province
- Linh Sơn, Thanh Hóa, a commune of Thanh Hóa Province
