= Dancing with the Stars Vietnam season 3 =

Dancing with the Stars Vietnam
- Season 3
- Starring: see below
- No. of episodes: 10

Release
- Original network: VTV3
- Original release: March 18 – June 17, 2012

Season chronology
- ← Previous; Season 2

Bước nhảy hoàn vũ 2012 is a season of Bước nhảy hoàn vũ produced by Vietnam Television and Cat Tien Sa Productions based upon the BBC Worldwide's Dancing with the Stars. Thanh Bạch and Đoan Trang did not return for this season. They are replaced by host Thanh Vân from season 1 and Nguyên Vũ, season 3-second runner-up. The new cast were officially announced on February 26, 2012.

The season is scheduled to premiere on March 18, 2012. Professional Aleks and two judges Khánh Thi and Chí Anh confirmed to return.

== Couples ==
Celebrity	Occupation	Professional Partner	Dancer Number	Status
Vũ Thị Hoàng My	Miss Vietnam 2010's 1st Runner-up	Hristo Ivanov Grachki	05	Eliminated 1st on April 8, 2012
Phan Tuấn Tú	Wheel of Fortune host	Vesela Kostadinova Nedyalkova	02	Eliminated 2nd on April 15, 2012
Quách Ngọc Ngoan	Actor	Vesela Georgieva Dimova	09	Eliminated 3rd on April 22, 2012
Huỳnh Đông	Actor	Rusina Boncheva Stefanova	04	Eliminated 4th on April 29, 2012
Nguyễn Ngọc Thùy Trang (ka Vân Trang)	Actress	Vasil Stoyanov Yovchev	08	Eliminated 5th on May 20, 2012
Trịnh Minh Quân	Recording Artist	Nikoleta Ilkova Petrova	06	Eliminated 6th on May 27, 2012
Bùi Thị Phương Thanh	Singer	Ivan Nedyalkov Raykov	03	Eliminated 7th on June 10, 2012
Lê Ngọc Minh Hằng	Singer / Actress	Atanas Georgiev Malamov	10	Participating
Trương Nam Thành	Model / Manhunt International 2011 Fourth Runner-up	Elena Hristova Hadzihristova	07	Participating
Nguyễn Thị Anh Thư	Model	Teodor Mitkov Zlatarev	01	Participating

== Scoring chart ==
Couples	Place	2	3	2+3	4	5	6	7	8	9	10
Minh Hằng & Atanas	1	32	37	69	32	37	39	36	38	37+39=76	40+38=78
Nam Thành & Elena	2	31	36	67	38	36	36	34	38	37+40=77	38+39=77
Anh Thư & Teodor	3	32	33	65	35	34	37	34	34	35+36=71	37+36=73
Phương Thanh & Ivan	4	32	31	63	35	33	35	38	34	34+37=71	
Minh Quân & Nicoleta	5	35	33	68	34	34	37	34	34		
Vân Trang & Vasil	6	34	35	69	35	36	35	32			
Huỳnh Đông & Rusina	7	32	33	65	33	34	32				
Ngọc Ngoan & Vesela D.	8	31	32	63	34	29					
Tuấn Tú & Vesela N.	9	30	32	62	30						
Hoàng My & Hristo	10	30	31	61							

Red numbers indicate the lowest score for each week.
Green numbers indicate the highest score for each week.
Underlined numbers indicate the favorite contestant of the week
indicates the winning couple.
indicates the runner-up couple.
indicates the third-place couple.
indicates the couple eliminated that week.
indicates the returning couple that finished in the bottom two.
indicates the returning couple that was the last to be called safe (they may or may have not been in the bottom two).

== Highest and lowest scoring performances ==
The best and worst performances in each dance according to the judges' marks are as follows:

Dance	Best dancer(s)	Highest score	Worst dancer(s)	Lowest score
Argentine Tango	Trương Nam Thành & Elena; Minh Hằng & Atanas	37	Phương Thanh & Ivan	34
Cha Cha Cha	Minh Quân & Nikoleta	35	Tuấn Tú & Vesela N.	30
Freestyle	Trương Nam Thành & Elena	39	Vân Trang & Vasil	32
Foxtrot	Phương Thanh & Ivan	38		
Jive	Anh Thư & Teodor	36	Tuấn Tú & Vesela	30
Mambo	Minh Hằng & Atanas	37	Vân Trang & Vasil	36
Paso Doble	Trương Nam Thành & Elena	40	Anh Thư & Teodor	36
Quickstep	Minh Hằng Atanas	37	Tuấn Tú & Vesela N.	32
Rumba	Minh Hằng & Atanas	40	Hoàng My & Hristo; Phương Thanh & Ivan	31
Salsa	Huỳnh Đông & Rusina	34	Phương Thanh & Ivan	33
Samba	Anh Thư & Teodor; Minh Quân & Nikoleta	34	Ngọc Ngoan & Vesela D.	29
Tango	Trương Nam Thành & Elena	38	Ngọc Ngoan & Vesela D.	34
Waltz	Anh Thư & Teodor; Phương Thanh & Ivan	32	Hoàng My & Hristo	30
Broadway	Minh Hằng & Atanas; Trương Nam Thành & Elena	38	Anh Thư & Teodor; Phương Thanh & Ivan; Minh Quân & Nikoleta	34

== Couples' highest and lowest scoring dances ==
Couples	Highest Scoring Dances	Lowest Scoring Dances
Huỳnh Đông & Rusina	Salsa (34)	Cha-cha-cha; Salsa (32)
Minh Hằng & Atanas	Rumba (40)	Jive (32)
Hoàng My & Hristo	Rumba (31)	Slow Waltz (30)
Ngọc Ngoan & Vesela D.	Tango (34)	Samba (29)
Minh Quân & Nicoleta	Rumba (37)	Quickstep (33)
Phương Thanh & Ivan	Foxtrot (38)	Rumba (31)
Nam Thành & Elena	Pasodoble (40)	Waltz (31)
Anh Thư & Teodor	Paso Doule; Argentine Tango (37)	Waltz (32)
Vân Trang & Vasil	Mambo (36)	Freestyle (32)
Tuấn Tú & Vesela N.	Quickstep (32)	Cha-Cha-Cha (30); Jive (30)

== Styles, scores and songs ==
=== Week 1 ===
Air date: March 18, 2012
Location: Quan Ngua Sports Palace, Hanoi
Routines:
Performers:
Fourth judge:
Guest(s):

=== Week 2+3 ===
Week 2
Air date: March 25
Routines: Cha-Cha-Cha or Slow Waltz
Performers: Hương Trà, Đinh Mạnh Ninh, Trà My, Tô Minh Đức
Fourth judge: Nguyễn Quang Dũng
Guest(s):

Individual judges scores in charts below (given in parentheses) are listed in this order from left to right: FOURTH JUDGE – Khánh Thi – Quốc Bảo – Chí Anh. The results of the voting is combined with the ranking of the panel of judges, and the celebrities have the higher scores in total survive.

Performing order

Couple	Jury		Style	Music
Couple	Score	#	Style	Music
Anh Thư & Teodor	32 (8,8,8,8)	8	Slow Waltz	"See the Day" – Dee C. Lee
Tuấn Tú & Vesela N.	30 (7,8,7,8)	2	Cha-Cha-Cha	"4 Minutes" – Madonna feat. Justin Timberlake
Phương Thanh & Ivan	32 (8,8,8,8)	8	Slow Waltz	"I See You" – Leona Lewis
Huỳnh Đông & Rusina	32 (9,7,8,8)	8	Cha-Cha-Cha	"She's a Lady" – Sir Tom Jones
Hoàng My & Hristo	30 (8,7,7,8)	2	Slow Waltz	"There You'll Be" – Faith Hill
Minh Quân & Nicoleta	35 (9,9,9,8)	10	Cha-Cha-Cha	"Love Potion No. 9" – The Clovers
Nam Thành & Elena	31 (9,8,7,7)	4	Slow Waltz	"A Time for Us" – from the Romeo and Juliet film in 1968
Vân Trang & Vasil	34 (9,8,8,9)	9	Cha-Cha-Cha	"Black or White" – Michael Jackson
Ngọc Ngoan & Vesela D.	31 (8,8,8,7)	4	Slow Waltz	"Love Ain't Here Anymore" – Take That
Minh Hằng & Atanas	32 (8,8,8,8)	8	Cha-Cha-Cha	"Oye Como Va" – written by Tito Puente

Week 3
Air date: April 8
Routines: Rumba or Quickstep
Performers: Hương Trà, Đinh Mạnh Ninh, Trà My, Tô Minh Đức
Fourth judge: Nguyễn Quang Dũng
Guest(s): Siu Black (season 1), Minh Béo (season 1), Nathan Lee

Individual judges scores in charts below (given in parentheses) are listed in this order from left to right: Nguyễn Quang Dũng – Khánh Thi – Quốc Bảo – Chí Anh. The results of the voting is combined with the ranking of the panel of judges, and the celebrities have the higher scores in total survive.

Performing order

Couple	Jury		Style	Music	
Couple	Score	#	Style	Music	
Hoàng My & Hristo	31 (7,7,9,8)		Rumba	"Vien M' Embasser" – "Julio Iglesias"	
Minh Quân & Nicoleta	33 (8,9,8,8)		Quickstep	"Mr.Pinstriped Suit" – written by Big Bag Voodoo Daddy	
Phương Thanh & Ivan	31 (7,8,8,8)		Rumba	"GoldenEye" – "Tina Tuner	
Huỳnh Đông& Rusina	33 (9,8,8,8)				Quickstep
Ngọc Ngoan& Vesela.D	32 (8,8,8,8)				Rumba
Vân Trang& Vasil	35 (9,8,9,9)				Quickstep
Anh Thư& Teodor	33 (8,9,8,8)				Rumba
Minh Hằng& Atanas	37 (9,9,10,9)				Quickstep
Nam Thành& Elena	36 (9,10,8,9)				Rumba
Tuấn Tú& Vesela.N	32 (8,8,8,8)				Quickstep

Scores in total

Couple	Judges' score	Public score	In total	Rank
Anh Thư & Teodor	6	6	12	# 4
Tuấn Tú & Vesela N.	2	9	11	# 6
Phương Thanh & Ivan	4	2	6	# 9
Huỳnh Đông & Rusina	6	7	13	# 3
Hoàng My & Hristo	1	1	2	# 10
Minh Quân & Nicoleta	8	4	12	# 4
Nam Thành & Elena	7	3	10	# 7
Vân Trang & Vasil	10	8	18	# 2
Ngọc Ngoan & Vesela D.	4	5	9	# 8
Minh Hằng & Atanas	10	10	20	# 1

=== Week 4 ===
Air date: April 15
Routines: Tango or Jive
Performers:
Fourth judge: Nguyễn Việt Tú
Guest(s):

Individual judges scores in charts below (given in parentheses) are listed in this order from left to right: Việt Tú – Khánh Thi – Quốc Bảo – Chí Anh. The results of the voting is combined with the ranking of the panel of judges, and the celebrities have the higher scores in total survive.

Performing order

Couple	Jury		Audience		Total (1:1)	Style	Music						
Couple	Score	#	Vote (%)	#	Total (1:1)	Style	Music						
Minh Hằng& Atanas	32 (8,8,8,8)					Jive							
Anh Thư& Teodor	35 (8,9,9,9)					Tango							
Huỳnh Đông& Rusina						Jive		Nam Thành& Elena	Tango	Minh Quân& Nikoleta	Jive	Phương Thanh& Ivan	Tango
Tuấn Tú& Vesela.N						Jive							
Ngọc Ngoan& Vesela.D						Tango							
Vân Trang& Vasil						Jive							

=== Week 5 ===
Air date: April 22
Routines: Exhibition dances (Samba, Mambo, Salsa, Lambada)
Performers: Dương Ánh Linh, Đinh Mạnh Ninh
Fourth judge: Trần Ly Ly
Guest(s): Đinh Mạnh Ninh, Phương Vy

Individual judges scores in charts below (given in parentheses) are listed in this order from left to right: Trần Ly Ly – Quốc Bảo – Khánh Thi – Chí Anh. The results of the voting is combined with the ranking of the panel of judges, and the celebrities have the higher scores in total survive.

Performing order

Couple	Jury		Audience		Total (1:1)	Style	Music
Couple	Score	#	Vote (%)	#	Total (1:1)	Style	Music
Phương Thanh & Ivan	33 (8,8,9,8)	2		2	4	Salsa	"La Vidaes un Carnaval"
Anh Thư & Teodor	34 (8,8,9,9)	6				Lambada	"Lambada" – Kaoma
Ngọc Ngoan & Vesela D.	29 (7,7,7,8)					Samba	"Waka Waka (This Time for Africa)" – Shakira
Huỳnh Đông& Rusina	34 (9,9,8,8)					Salsa	–
Nam Thành& Elena	36 (9,9,9,9)					Lambada	–
Minh Quân& Nikoleta	34 (9,8,8,9)					Samba	–
Minh Hằng& Atanas	37 (9,10,9,9)					Mambo	–
Vân Trang& Vasil	36 (9,9,9,9)					Mambo	–

=== Week 6 ===
Air date: April 29
Themes: Night of Films
Performers: Tô Minh Đức, Trà My, Đinh Mạnh Ninh, S.I.N.E group
Fourth judge: Hồ Hoài Anh
Guest(s): Hồ Hoài Anh, Lưu Hương Giang, Yến Trang

Individual judges scores in charts below (given in parentheses) are listed in this order from left to right: Hồ Hoài Anh – Khánh Thi -Quốc Bảo – Chí Anh. The results of the voting is combined with the ranking of the panel of judges, and the celebrities have the higher scores in total survive.

Performing order

Couple	Jury		Audience		Total (1:1)	Style	Music
Couple	Score	#	Vote (%)	#	Total (1:1)	Style	Music
Nam Thành & Elena	36 (9,9,9,9)	4				Jive / Quickstep / Swing	"You're the One That I Want" – from Grease
Vân Trang & Vasil	35 (9,9,9,8)	3				Tango	"Asi se Baila el Tango" – from Take the Lead
Huỳnh Đông & Rusina	32 (8,8,8,8)	1				Salsa	"(I've Had) The Time of My Life" – from Dirty Dancing
Anh Thư & Teodor	37 (10,10,9,8)	6				Pasodoble	"The Raiders March" – from Raiders of the Lost Ark
Phương Thanh & Ivan	35 (10,9,8,8)	3				Tango / Pasodoble	"Spanish Pasodoble" – from The Mask of Zorro, 1998 version
Minh Quân & Nicoleta	37 (10,9,9,9)	6				Rumba	"Come What May" – from Moulin Rouge!, 2001 version
Minh Hằng & Atanas	39 (10,10,10,9)	7				Rumba	"Eres Todo en Mí (You're My Everything)" – from Dance with Me

=== Week 7 ===
Air date: May 20
Routines: Freestyle
Performers:
Fourth judge:
Guest(s):

Vân Trang & Vasil 32 (8,8,8,8)

Hip Hop

Minh Quân & Nikoleta 34 (8,9,8,9)

Cha cha cha, Samba, Salsa

Minh Hằng & Atanas 36 (9,9,9,9)

Múa Đương Đại

Anh Thư & Teodor 34 (8,9,9,8)

Múa Đương Đại

Nam Thành & Elena 34 (9,8,8,9)

Múa Dân Tộc Bulgaria

Phương Thanh & Ivan 38 (9,10,9,10)

Múa Dân Gian, Foxtrot

=== Week 8 ===
Air date: May 27
Routines:
Performers:
Fourth judge:
Guest(s):

Anh Thư & Teodor
Samba 
34(9,8,8,9)

Minh Quân & Nicoleta
Rumba
34 (8,8,9,9)

Minh Hằng & Atanas
Broadway
38 (9,10,9,10)

Phương Thanh & Ivan

=== Week 9 ===
Air date: June 10
Routines:
Performers:
Fourth judge:
Guest(s):

=== Week 10 – Finale ===
Air date: June 17
Routines:
Performers:
Fourth judge:
Guest(s):

== Call-out order ==
Order	Episode							
Order	2+3	4	5	6	7	8	9	10
1	Anh Thư & Teodor		Minh Hằng & Atanas	Anh Thư & Teodor	Phương Thanh & Ivan	Minh Hằng & Atanas		
2	Minh Hằng & Atanas^{(W3)}		Vân Trang & Vasil	Minh Quân & Nicoleta	Minh Hằng & Atanas	Nam Thành & Elena		
3	Nam Thành & Elena		Nam Thành & Elena	Phương Thanh & Ivan	Anh Thư & Teodor	Anh Thư & Teodor		
4	Ngọc Ngoan & Vesela D.		Huỳnh Đông & Rusina	Vân Trang & Vasil	Nam Thành & Elena	Phương Thanh & Ivan		
5	Tuấn Tú & Vesela N.		Anh Thư & Teodor	Nam Thành & Elena	Minh Quân & Nicoleta	Minh Quân & Nicoleta		
6	Huỳnh Đông & Rusina		Minh Quân & Nicoleta	Minh Hằng & Atanas	Vân Trang & Vasil			
7	Phương Thanh & Ivan		Phương Thanh & Ivan	Huỳnh Đông & Rusina				
8	Minh Quân & Nicoleta^{(W2)}	Minh Hằng & Atanas	Ngọc Ngoan & Vesela D.					
9	Vân Trang & Vasil	Tuấn Tú & Vesela N.						
10	Hoàng My & Hristo							

This couple came in first place with the judges.
This couple came in last place with the judges.
This couple came in last place with the judges and was eliminated.
This couple was eliminated.
This couple was audience's favorite of the week.
This couple came in first place with the judges and gained the most vote from audience.
This couple won the competition.
This couple came in second in the competition.
This couple came in third in the competition

== Dance chart ==
The celebrities and professional partners danced one of these routines for each corresponding week.

- Week 2: Cha-Cha-Cha or English Waltz
- Week 3: Rumba or Quickstep
- Week 4: Tango or Jive
- Week 5: Exotic (Mambo, Samba, Salsa, or Lambada)
- Week 6: Movie theme
- Week 7: Freestyle and Viennese Waltz
- Week 8: Broadway and Salsa

Team	2	3	4	5	6	7		8		9	10
Minh Hằng & Atanas	Cha-Cha-Cha	Quickstep	Jive	Mambo	Rumba	Freestyle	Viennese Waltz	Broadway	Salsa		
Phương Thanh & Ivan	Slow Waltz	Rumba	Tango	Salsa	Tango / Pasodoble	Freestyle	Viennese Waltz	Broadway	Salsa		
Nam Thành & Elena	Slow Waltz	Rumba	Tango	Lambada	Jive / Quickstep / Swing	Freestyle	Viennese Waltz	Broadway	Salsa		
Anh Thư & Teodor	Slow Waltz	Rumba	Tango	Lambada	Pasodoble	Freestyle	Viennese Waltz	Broadway	Salsa		
Minh Quân & Nicoleta	Cha-Cha-Cha	Quickstep	Jive	Samba	Rumba	Freestyle	Viennese Waltz	Broadway	Salsa		
Vân Trang & Vasil	Cha-Cha-Cha	Quickstep	Jive	Mambo	Tango	Freestyle	Viennese Waltz		Salsa		
Huỳnh Đông & Rusina	Cha-Cha-Cha	Quickstep	Jive	Salsa	Salsa						
Ngọc Ngoan & Vesela D.	Slow Waltz	Rumba	Tango	Samba							
Tuấn Tú & Vesela N.	Cha-Cha-Cha	Quickstep	Jive								
Hoàng My & Hristo	Slow Waltz	Rumba									

Highest scoring dance
Lowest scoring dance
Performed but not scored

== Guest performances ==
Date	Performer(s)	Song(s)	Dancers
March 25, 2012	Nguyễn Ngọc Anh & Hoàng Hải	"When You Tell Me That You Love Me"	Aleks & Vesela N.
April 8, 2012	[pre-recording]	"I'm a Believer"	Siu Black & Minh Béo
April 8, 2012	Nathan Lee	"Nostalgia"	Nicoletta & Ivan
April 15, 2012	Tùng Dương	"I Will Always Love You"	Aleks & Elena
April 22, 2012	Đinh Mạnh Ninh	"Can't Take My Eyes Off You"	[none]
April 22, 2012	[pre-recording]	"Corpus Rex"	Alesk & Elena, Atanas & Vesela N.
April 22, 2012	Phương Vy	"Wavin' Flag"	[all]
April 29, 2012	[pre-recording]	"Forget You"	Aleks, Elena, Atanas, Vasil, Rusina & Vesela D.
April 29, 2012	Lưu Hương Giang	"SOS"	[none]
April 29, 2012	Hồ Hoài Anh & Lưu Hương Giang	"Moves Like Jagger"	[none]
April 29, 2012	[pre-recording]	"El Capitalismo Foraneo" from Ocean's Twelve	Aleks & Yến Trang
