= Dancing with the Stars Vietnam season 2 =

Dancing with the Stars Vietnam
- Season 2
- Starring: see below
- No. of episodes: 10

Release
- Original network: VTV3
- Original release: April 17, 2011 – present

Season chronology
- ← Previous; Season 1 Next → Season 3

Bước nhảy hoàn vũ 2011 is the second season of Bước nhảy hoàn vũ produced by Vietnam Television and Cat Tien Sa Productions based upon the BBC Worldwide's Dancing with the Stars. The show encountered numerous changes, including a proposed reduction of the judging panel to the number of just three judges (three return), but was opposed and remained unchanged at four (two among them are new), the quitting of several cast members prior the launching and the departure of judges either before or during the show, a new co-host, new professionals as well as multiple changes in format written by the copyright holder from Bulgaria. The first show was aired on VTV3 with 10 celebrities. There was not an elimination the first two weeks of competition. The first took place on the third week (May 1).

Only Khánh Thi and Chí Anh, two judges from the previous season and Thanh Bạch returned. Thanh Vân left the show involved in her pregnancy. Two directors, Nguyễn Quang Dũng and Lê Hoàng, claimed they had conflicts with timetables, so they could not remain with the show for ten episodes. It was officially announced that Trần Tiến and Đức Huy consecutively took the roles, respectively. Ngô Thanh Vân was offered the female host role meanwhile executive producer Lại Văn Sâm was offered the fourth slot on the judging panel but both softly refused. First season runner-up Đoan Trang was confirmed as co-host. On May 11, Trần Tiến revealed his departure from the show and the producer put Quang Dũng back to the panel.

Professionals Anna Silova and Tisho Gavrilov also returned for one more season. Others were Aleksandar Vachev, Daniel Nikolov Denev, Lachezar Stefanov Todorov, Petyo Dimitrov Stoyanov, Petya Bozhidarova Dimitrova, Valeriya Nikolaeva Bozukova, Tsveta Krasimirova Tsocheva and Iva Ludmilova Grigorova. Vũ Thu Minh was announced to be the second Dancing Queen with her partner, Lachezar Stefanov Todorov.

== Controversies ==
=== Contestants ===
Huy Tran was one of the first person to edit Michael Jackson's song "Beat it" and made it famous. Phan Anh, Thủy Tiên, Vũ Thu Phương, and Trương Ngọc Tình were the first four faces to appear in the competition, but right later two male celebrities confirmed they were no longer joining the cast members. Afterwards, Thu Minh, Huy Khánh, Đại Nghĩa, Phạm Anh Khoa, Kim Hiền, Thanh Thúy and Vĩnh Thụy were confirmed to participate. On March 29, Vĩnh Thụy withdrew from the competition. Immediately, Hứa Vỹ Văn was chosen to replace and Nguyên Vũ was the last celebrity to join.

=== Judges' acting roles ===
The departure of Trần Tiến has raised a lot controversial problems to Bước Nhảy Hoàn Vũ this year. Many journalists from notable daily newspapers and magazines (namely Tuổi Trẻ, Thanh Niên, VnExpress, etc.) accused the producers of ill preparing, organizing the show and forcing judges play acting roles in many different types of characteristics of judging on the panel (like easy-going, humour, fantastic, etc.) like a color commentator rather than allowing them to naturally judge the performance from contestants. The grading scale even restrictedly ranges from 7 up to 10; in the case of Chí Anh (who did not hesitate assigning a 6 without explanation or comment to a contestant), he was immediately given a feedback by Host Thanh Bạch whether the grade was wrong.

The jury were not given contracts to sign nor were they informed as to how much time they would spend on this competition. Director Lê Hoàng confirmed his involvement prior to the first week launched, but did not appear in the first week and left the following week to be replaced by musician Đức Huy.

=== Elimination order ===
According to Người đưa tin, the withdrawal of Vĩnh Thụy was like a pre-show elimination because no one could be too fool to easily leave the highest rated show which helped them a lot to gain more fame and earn more money. The pre-elimination was heavily promoted by the media.

Jury carried half weight of the total score, the other half weight by audience's messages... and we don't know who classified these messages... Producers revealed how much, we only knew right that much... Finally, everything is just simply in the script.

— Hoàng Anh, Huy Khánh's ex-housewife

About the real cast member, step by step Vĩ Văn, Kim Hiền, Huy Khánh, Vũ Thu Phương, etc. were eliminated as audience thought. Hoàng Anh, who was Huy Khánh's ex-wife, used Facebook note for raising a tension with the producers after he was out of the race. She also reported Khánh said to their kid to watch Bước nhảy hoàn vũ on Sunday night prior to his elimination. That seemed the producers played treat, particularly had rigged the show. Producers denied these claims as baseless stating that there was officially a company collecting and classifying messages, and the results were not to be revealed by producers alone without VTV's permission. Simultaneously, they refused to give any information about how Huy Khánh was sent home. Under pressure, producers finally agreed to provide information about textgate and to clarify everything.

=== Mimicking ===
On week 7, Thu Minh wowed the judging panel with her exotic dance concept. Later, she came out on top of the board with two 10s for Samba. The next Monday, it was revealed that the choreography and wardrobe she wore looked amazingly similar to those of Max Kozhevnikov and Yulia Zagoruychenko in the World Super Stars Dance Festival in 2006. In sudden press reports earlier in the week, two main judges Khánh Thi and Chí Anh stated "mimicking is actually self mastering, is the creativity of Thu Minh and Lachezar". Producers tried to help Thu Minh, claiming it was not Thu Minh's fault, that the wardrobe was made from our set of designers' ideas and gave no comment about the choreography.

=== Conflict ===
Khánh Thi was viewed as envious of Thủy Tiên for the latter's sexy body language and her risky techniques used in performances. In press reports, she denied having any conflict with competitor Thủy Tiên, resulting in unfair marks.

=== Timing violation ===
Every performance should be performed in one and a half minutes according to standard practices in almost all versions Dancing with the Stars and in international competitions. The length of Thu Minh's performance was deemed the longest and the shortest performance was that of Đại Nghĩa with only 1 minute 40 seconds. Thu Minh was crowned the winner. Once again in the week 9 and in the finale, Thu Minh and Lacho had additional performances.

=== Textgate ===
During week 9, there was additional controversy the week couple Anh Khoa and Iva were voted off. Some voters claimed that they could not send messages voting for Anh Khoa during textgate open, when received confirmatory text "Vui lòng nhắn tin bình chọn sau khi các thí sinh đã tham gia xong phần thi của mình. Xin chân thành cảm ơn" (literally: "Text after all performances done. Thank you for voting"). It is not clear if the "Thank you for voting" messages were incorrectly assigned, as if the replies were incorrectly assigned, votes would have been counted for the correct contestant despite the voters receiving the wrong "thank you" messages.

All involved including the broadcaster, producers and textgate owner informed no errors during week 9 (June 26) in public press. They also revealed the out of phase of the text-gate with live audience which meant people could only text formally from 30 seconds up to a minute in normal mode after the announcement of hosts and clearly voting could be continued during short time when the gate was deemed closed.

=== Unfair scores ===
In the case of Anh Khoa and Iva, all four judges gathered for quick break for discussion about giving scores.

They are harshly criticized for giving generous scores very sentimentally based upon the case that contestants or partners' sickness, family's bad luck, not so serious injury and so on from the very first beginning of season 1 onwards.

=== No live shows in Ho Chi Minh City, No international winners ===
In public press released for pre-production, there would exist many live shows in Ho Chi Minh City and other live shows in Vũng Tàu as producers informed. Later, Hanoi was offered 1-2 live shows for premiere weeks. Actually after the series ended, audience in HCMC had none show to enjoy. One of judges explained clearly bad organization and a bunch of controversies let Department of Culture, Sports and Tourism of Ho Chi Minh City not allow the show to arrive at HCMC.

Also, no winners from China Mainland, Indonesia, Finland came performing.

=== Finale crowning ===
Again and again, voting problem raised tension. Few voters affirmed that there was no message responded even 7 hours later. It is generally agreed Thu Minh deserved the win for her spectacular and outstanding Rumba and Freestyle routines engraving two highest scores to the show's history and praised by the most talented former dancing couple Khánh Thi and Chí Anh. People, whereas, wondered themselves why Thủy Tiên previously determined the favourite competitor of the year had fewer votes and why audience backed out at her. No official statement was made.

With 79 [with judges] and the percentage of votes is 46.02, scores 4 [in total]... the runner-up is Thủy Tiên

— said Đoan Trang

Besides that, there was much discussion in the communication industry about the real winner because there was confusion over the crowning. Initially, Đoan Trang revealed the runner-up, thus the other was the winner. Trang announced 79 scored by the runner-up. Moments that turned Thủy Tiên (who obviously scored 77) to the edge of glory and turned Thu Minh (who truly scored 79 out of possible 80) slightly blue was quickly stopped with the real name "Thủy Tiên", leading everyone got shocked. As interpreted, mistakes was caused by result paper.

=== Ngô Thanh Vân finale involvement ===
Many fans of first season winner, Ngô Thanh Vân, were upset that she did not take part in the whole new season, especially season finale. Executive producer Lương Minh responded in an interview with Dân Trí: "We have invited her to season finale as guest; however, she refused to attend because of being busy [going to America]. As she showed agreement, we could not change the schedule set because Tisho, her former partner doesn't have enough time [...] and the show's length doesn't allow us to do so. [...] Maybe she can join many next season finales". Asked Thanh Vân, "Uhm... due to some reasons... tomorrow I can't be in BNHV... Everyone... [I] don't know what to say... please don't go sorrow...!!!" She also mentioned, "I am always ready to serve when invited; however, at the time, I give no comments".

=== Bước nhảy hoàn vũ: The Striptease Show ===
Tendency of peeling clothes (undressing) on stage was up gradually, beginning in the first week and accumulating in the finale. It is more focused on the "tease" in "striptease" than the "strip". At least six peeling actions were performed namely by Thu Minh, Valeriya and Đại Nghĩa, Kim Hiền, Vũ Thu Phương and Hồ Ngọc Hà herself. These actions are considered over-sexy, seductive and influence the culture in a bad manner.

== Couples ==
Celebrity	Occupation	Professional Partner	Dancer Number	Status
Hứa Vĩ Văn	Actor & Former Model	Anna Nikolaeva Silova	02	Eliminated 1st on May 1, 2011
Kim Hiền	Actress	Daniel Nikolov Denev	01	Eliminated 2nd on May 15, 2011
Trần Huy Khánh	Actor & former Model	Tsveta Krasimirova Tsocheva	06	Eliminated 3rd on May 22, 2011
Vũ Thu Phương	Actress & Model	Tihomir Romanov Gavrilov	03	Eliminated 4th on May 29, 2011
Bùi Đại Nghĩa	Comedic Actor	Valeriya Nikolaeva Bozukova	07	Eliminated 5th on June 5, 2011
Lê Thị Thanh Thúy	Dramatic Actress	Aleksandar Iliev Vachev	05	Eliminated 6th on June 19, 2011
Phạm Anh Khoa	Rock Recording Artist	Iva Ludmilova Grigorova	04	Eliminated 7th on June 26, 2011
Lê Nguyên Vũ	Entertainer, Show Host & Actor	Petya Bozhidarova Dimitrova	09	2nd Runner-Up on July 3, 2011
Trần Thị Thủy Tiên	Recording Artist	Petyo Dimitrov Stoyanov	10	1st Runner-Up on July 3, 2011
Vũ Thu Minh (Thu Minh)	Dance/Pop Recording Artist	Lachezar Stefanov Todorov	08	Winner on July 3, 2011

== Scoring chart ==
Couples	Place	2	3	2+3	4	5	6	7	8	9	10
Thu Minh & Lachezar	1	36	34	70	36	35	38	37	36	38+35=73	40+39=79
Thủy Tiên & Petyo	2	33	30	63	35	34	34	35	35	36+36=72	37+40=77
Nguyên Vũ & Petya	3	35	32	67	33	34	34	35	38	38+37=75	37+38=75
Anh Khoa & Iva	4	34	38	72	33	30	34	34	38	37+34=71	
Thanh Thúy & Aleks	5	36	33	69	34	38	37	34	36		
Đại Nghĩa & Valeriya	6	33	34	67	35	33	34	35			
Thu Phương & Tisho	7	32	35	67	32	31	32				
Huy Khánh & Tsveta	8	32	33	65	35	31					
Kim Hiền & Daniel	9	30	35	65	31						
Vĩ Văn & Anna	10	31	29	60							

Red numbers indicate the lowest score for each week.
Green numbers indicate the highest score for each week.
Underlined numbers indicate the favorite contestant of the week
indicates the winning couple.
indicates the runner-up couple.
indicates the third-place couple.
indicates the couple eliminated that week.
indicates the returning couple that finished in the bottom two.
indicates the returning couple that was the last to be called safe (they may or may have not been in the bottom two).

- Week 2: The competition officially kicked off. Musician Đức Huy joined the judging panel in replacement with Lê Hoàng. Thu Minh & Lachezar and Thanh Thúy & Aleksandar gained the best scores, were in tie at the first place with 36/40 for English Waltz and Cha-Cha-Cha, respectively. Kim Hiền & Daniel landed into the bottom with 30/40 for their Cha-Cha-Cha.
- Week 3: Despite suffering from Chickenpox (so did Kim Hiền), Anh Khoa & Iva performed quite well and came out on top of the leader board with 38/40 including two first 10s of the season for their Bulgarian folk dance. In combination with Week 2, they had the best score. Vĩ Văn & Anna's ill performance led them to be eliminated. This was also the last week, Trần Tiến judged the show.
- Week 4: After Trần Tiến's departure from the show, Nguyễn Quang Dũng was confirmed be back this season. Luchezar Stefanov Todorov did not team up with Thu Minh because of Chickenpox and he is alternated by Ngô Minh Đức, the very first Vietnamese professional to join Bước nhảy hoàn vũ. Thu Minh & Ngô Minh Đức were at top of the leaderboard with four 9s (36/40). Kim Hiền & Daniel received 31/40 for their Quickstep and were subsequently sent home.
- Week 5: Lachezar returned and helped Thu Minh score at 35/40, including one 10 from Khánh Thi. Thanh Thúy & Aleks' performance received 38/40 with two 10s and were at top of the leaderboard. In spite of not having the least score, Huy Khánh & Tsveta were eliminated.
- Week 6: Thu Minh & Lachezar once again were on top with 38/40, including two 10s for their Paso doble. Thanh Thúy & Aleksandar came second with 37/40 including one 10 for their Foxtrot. As a result, Vũ Thu Phương & Tisho were eliminated after landing to the bottom two three times in a row.
- Week 7: With two 10s from judges for their Samba, Thu Minh & Lachezar came out on top of the leaderboard with 37/40, meanwhile Thanh Thúy & Aleks and Anh Khoa & Iva received the least scores for their worst Samba. As a result, Đại Nghĩa & Valeriya were sent home.
- Week 8: Aleksandar got leg-injured during rehearsal. Thanh Thúy let the nerve turn her down and send her package home.
- Week 9: Every single couple scored at least one 10 for their performance. Anh Khoa and Iva had a worse performance, leading them land to bottom two and be sent home.
- Week 10 - Finale: First time in history, 40 was scored and there were two 40s assigned consecutively by Thu Minh & Lacho for the Rumba and by Thủy Tiên & Petyo for Freestyle. Ultimately, Thu Minh was crowned the Dancing Queen.

== Highest and lowest scoring performances ==
The best and worst performances in each dance according to the judges' marks are as follows:

Dance	Best dancer(s)	Highest score	Worst dancer(s)	Lowest score
Argentine Tango				
Cha Cha Cha				
Freestyle				
Foxtrot				
Jive				
Mambo				
Paso Doble				
Quickstep				
Rumba				
Salsa				
Samba				
Tango				
Viennese Waltz				
Waltz				
Movie Freestyle				

== Couples' highest and lowest scoring dances ==
Couples	Highest Scoring Dances	Lowest Scoring Dances
Thu Minh & Lucho	Rumba(40)	Movie Freestyle (34)
Thủy Tiên & Petyo	Freestyle(40)	Movie Freestyle(30)
Nguyên Vũ & Petya	Paso Doble, Waltz and Freestyle(38)	Movie Freestyle(32)
Anh Khoa & Iva	Movie Freestyle and Jive(38)	Tango(30)
Thanh Thúy & Aleks	Jive(38)	Movie Freestyle(33)
Đại Nghĩa & Valeriya	Quickstep and Samba(35)	Cha Cha Cha and Jive(33)
Thu Phương & Tisho	Movie Freestyle(35)	Jive(31)
Huy Khánh & Tsveta	Rumba(35)	Tango(31)
Kim Hiền & Daniel	Movie Freestyle(35)	Cha Cha Cha(30)
Vĩ Văn & Anna	Waltz(31)	Movie Freestyle(29)

== Styles, scores & songs ==
=== Week 1 - Launch Night ===
Air date: April 17, 2011
Location: Quan Ngua Sports Palace, Hanoi

The season premiere included some special performances from guests, judges, professionals and competitors. The main competition kicks off in the following week.

=== Week 2 + 3 ===
==== Week 2 ====
Air date: April 24
Location: Quan Ngua Sports Palace, Hanoi
Routines: Cha-Cha-Cha and English Waltz
Performers: Hồ Trung Dũng, Tiêu Châu Như Quỳnh, Dương Ánh Linh
Guest(s): Nguyễn Ngọc Anh, violist Trần Quang Duy

Individual judges scores in charts below (given in parentheses) are listed in this order from left to right: Trần Tiến - Khánh Thi - Đức Huy - Chí Anh. The results of the voting is combined with the ranking of the panel of judges, and the celebrities have the higher scores in total survive.

Performing order

Couple	Jury		Style	Music
Couple	Score	#	Style	Music
Kim Hiền & Daniel	30 (7,7,8,8)	1	Cha-cha-cha	"Uptown Girl" – Billy Joel
Vĩ Văn & Anna	31 (7,7,8,9)	2	English Waltz	"Only Time" – Enya
Thu Phương & Tisho	32 (8,8,8,8)	4	Cha-cha-cha	"Come On Over Baby (All I Want Is You)" – Christina Aguilera
Anh Khoa & Iva	34 (9,8,8,9)	7	English Waltz	"Davy Jones theme" – Hans Zimmer's melody from Pirates of the Caribbean: At World's End
Thanh Thúy & Aleks	36 (9,9,9,9)	10	Cha-cha-cha	"Sway" – Pablo Beltrán Ruiz
Huy Khánh & Tsveta	32 (8,8,8,8)	4	English Waltz	"When Forever Has Gone" – Demis Roussos
Đại Nghĩa & Valeriya	33 (8,8,9,8)	6	Cha-Cha-Cha	"Speak up Mambo (Cuentame)" – The Manhattan Transfer
Thu Minh & Lachezar	36 (9,9,9,9)	10	English Waltz	"It Is You (I Have Loved)" – written and performed by Dana Glover from Shrek
Nguyên Vũ & Petya	35 (9,9,9,8)	8	Cha-cha-cha	"Amor" – Ricky Martin
Thủy Tiên & Petyo	33 (9,8,8,8)	6	English Waltz	"Nocturne" – Secret Garden

==== Week 3 ====
Air date: May 1
Location: Quan Ngua Sports Palace, Hanoi
Routines: Freestyle
Performers: Hồ Trung Dũng, Tiêu Châu Như Quỳnh, Lê Kim Ngân
Guest(s): DJ Slim V, Tùng Dương

Individual judges scores in charts below (given in parentheses) are listed in this order from left to right: Trần Tiến - Khánh Thi - Đức Huy - Chí Anh. The results of the voting is combined with the ranking of the panel of judges, and the celebrities have the higher scores in total survive. It is the last week that Trần Tiến joins the judging panel.

Performing order

Couple	Jury		Style	Music
Couple	Score	#	Style	Music
Nguyên Vũ & Petya	32 (8,8,8,8)	3	Freestyle	composed by Klaus Badelt from Pirates of the Caribbean: The Curse of the Black Pearl
Thu Phương & Tisho (& Petyo)	35 (9,8,9,9)	9	Freestyle	composed by Tan Dun from The Banquet (2006)
Huy Khánh & Tsveta	33 (8,8,8,9)	5	Freestyle	"Hit the Road Jack" – Percy Mayfield
Thanh Thúy & Aleks	33 (9,9,8,7)	5	Freestyle	"Duel" – Bond
Anh Khoa & Iva	38 (9,9,10,10)	10	Freestyle	"Shopska Ruchenitsa" – the Bulgarian folksong
Kim Hiền & Daniel	35 (9,9,8,9)	9	Freestyle	"All That Jazz" – from the 1975 Chicago musical
Thu Minh & Lachezar	34 (9,9,8,8)	7	Freestyle	"Low" – Flo Rida feat. T-Pain from Step Up 2: The Streets
Đại Nghĩa & Valeriya	34 (9,8,9,8)	7	Freestyle	"The Phantom of the Opera" – from the 1986 musical
Thủy Tiên & Petyo	30 (8,7,8,7)	2	Freestyle	"Conga" – Miami Sound Machine led by Gloria Estefan
Vĩ Văn & Anna	29 (8,7,8,6)	1	Freestyle	"Singin' in the Rain" – from Hollywood Revue Of 1929

=== Week 4 ===
Air date: May 15
Location: Quan Ngua Sports Palace, Hanoi
Routines: Rumba or Quickstep
Performers: Hồ Trung Dũng, Tiêu Châu Như Quỳnh, Lê Kim Ngân
Guest(s): Minh Quân, professional Ngô Minh Đức

Nguyễn Quang Dũng prominently takes his role back after Trần Tiến's announcing his departure. Individual judges scores in charts below (given in parentheses) are listed in this order from left to right: Nguyễn Quang Dũng - Khánh Thi - Đức Huy - Chí Anh. The results of the voting is combined with the ranking of the panel of judges, and the celebrities have the higher scores in total survive.

Performing order

Couple	Jury		Audience		Total (1:1)	Style	Music
Couple	Score	#	Vote (%)	#	Total (1:1)	Style	Music
Nguyên Vũ & Petya	33 (8,9,8,8)	4				Quickstep	"Katuysha"/"Moscow Nights" Medley – by Valentina Batishcheva/the latter composed by Vasily Solovyov-Sedoi
Anh Khoa & Iva	33 (8,8,8,9)	4				Rumba	"Bésame Mucho" – written by Consuelo Velázquez
Thu Phương & Tisho	32 (8,8,8,8)	2				Quickstep	"Walking on Sunshine" – Katrina and the Waves
Thu Minh &Ngô Minh Đức	36 (9,9,9,9)	9				Rumba	"My All" – Mariah Carey
Thanh Thúy & Aleks	34 (9,9,8,8)	5				Quickstep	"You're the One That I Want" – John Travolta & Olivia Newton-John from Grease
Thủy Tiên & Petyo	35 (8,9,9,9)	8				Rumba	"Hold Me" – Ebba Forsberg from Model (Korean drama)
Đại Nghĩa & Iva	35 (8,9,9,9)	8				Quickstep	"Lucky Day" – Jonathan Edwards
Huy Khánh & Tsveta	35 (9,9,9,8)	8				Rumba	"Song from a Secret Garden – composed by Eileen Foster, performed by Secret Garden
Kim Hiền & Daniel	31 (7,8,8,8)	1				Quickstep	"Mr. Pinstripe Suit" – Big Bad Voodoo Daddy

=== Week 5 ===
Air date: May 22
Location: Quan Ngua Sports Palace, Hanoi
Routines: Jive & Tango
Performers: Lê Kim Ngân, Dương Ánh Linh & Tuyết Mai
Guest(s): violist Bùi Quang Duy, Đức Tuấn

Individual judges scores in charts below (given in parentheses) are listed in this order from left to right: Nguyễn Quang Dũng - Khánh Thi - Đức Huy - Chí Anh. The results of the voting is combined with the ranking of the panel of judges, and the celebrities have the higher scores in total survive.

Performing order

Couple	Jury		Audience		Total (1:1)	Style	Music
Couple	Score	#	Vote (%)	#	Total (1:1)	Style	Music
Thu Minh & Lacho	35 (9,10,8,8)	2				Tango	"Toxic" – Britney Spears
Đại Nghĩa & Valeriya	33 (9,8,8,8)	5				Jive	"Candyman" – Christina Aguilera
Anh Khoa & Iva	30 (8,8,7,7)	8				Tango	"El Tango de Roxanne" – from Moulin Rouge!
Nguyên Vũ & Petya	34 (9,9,8,8)	3				Jive	"Wild Dances" – Ruslana
Thủy Tiên & Petyo	34 (9,8,9,8)	3				Tango	"Parachute" – Cheryl Cole
Thu Phương & Tisho	31 (7,8,8,8)	6				Jive	"SOS" – Rihanna
Huy Khánh & Tsveta	31 (7,9,8,7)	6				Tango	"Libertango" – composed by Ástor Piazzolla
Thanh Thúy & Aleks	38 (10,10,9,9)	1				Jive	"She Won't Say Yes" – The Love Dogs

=== Week 6 ===
Air date: May 29
Location: Quan Ngua Sports Palace, Hanoi
Routines: Foxtrot or Pasodoble
Performers: Hồ Trung Dũng, Tiêu Châu Như Quỳnh & Lê Kim Ngân
Guest(s): Doreen Fernandez from the Philippines

Individual judges scores in charts below (given in parentheses) are listed in this order from left to right: Nguyễn Quang Dũng - Khánh Thi - Đức Huy - Chí Anh. The results of the voting is combined with the ranking of the panel of judges, and the celebrities have the higher scores in total survive.

Performing order

Couple	Jury		Audience		Total (1:1)	Style	Music
Couple	Score	#	Vote (%)	#	Total (1:1)	Style	Music
Thu Phương & Tisho	32 (8,8,8,8)	1				Foxtrot	from The Pink Panther
Anh Khoa & Iva	34 (9,8,9,8)	5				Pasodoble	"España cañí" – Pascual Marquina Narro
Nguyên Vũ & Petya	34 (9,9,9,7)	5				Foxtrot	"Without You" – Badfinger
Thu Minh & Lacho	38 (10,10,9,9)	7				Pasodoble	from The Mask of Zorro
Đại Nghĩa & Valeriya	34 (8,8,9,9)	5				Foxtrot	"You Don't Have to Say You Love Me" – Dusty Springfield
Thủy Tiên & Petyo	34 (9,8,9,8)	5				Pasodoble	"O Fortuna" – composed by Carl Orff
Thanh Thúy & Aleks	37 (9,10,9,9)	6				Foxtrot	"Stand by Me" – Ben E. King

=== Week 7 ===
Air date: June 5
Location: Quan Ngua Sports Palace, Hanoi
Routines: Samba and Exhibition Dance (Cha-Cha-Cha)
Performers: Hồ Trung Dũng, Tiêu Châu Như Quỳnh, Lê Kim Ngân & Mr. A
Guest(s): Thanh Lam

Individual judges scores in charts below (given in parentheses) are listed in this order from left to right: Nguyễn Quang Dũng - Khánh Thi - Đức Huy - Chí Anh. The results of the voting is combined with the ranking of the panel of judges, and the celebrities have the higher scores in total survive.

Performing order

Couple	Jury		Audience		Total (1:1)	Style	Music
Couple	Score	#	Vote (%)	#	Total (1:1)	Style	Music
Nguyên Vũ & Petya	35 (8,10,9,8)	5				Samba	"Hips Don't Lie" – Shakira feat. Wyclef Jean
Thủy Tiên & Petya	35 (8,9,9,9)	5				Samba	"On the Floor" – Jennifer Lopez feat. Pitbull
Anh Khoa & Iva	34 (7,8,9,10)	2				Samba	"Mas que Nada" – Jorge Ben
Thu Minh & Lacho	37 (9,10,8,10)	6				Samba	"Dance Bird"/"Hip Hip Chin Chin" Medley – Club des Belugas
Đại Nghĩa & Valeriya	35 (8,9,9,9)	5				Samba	"La Bomba" – Ricky Martin
Thanh Thúy & Aleks	34 (8,9,8,9)	2				Samba	"Willy Parranda" – Agua de Coco
Top 6 couples	do not score					Cha-Cha-Cha	"Let's Get Loud" – Jennifer Lopez

=== Week 8 ===
Air date: June 19
Location: Complex Gymnasium of Vũng Tàu
Routines: Viennese Waltz and One unlearned routine from past weeks
Performers: Hồ Trung Dũng, Tiêu Châu Như Quỳnh, Lê Kim Ngân & Dương Ánh Linh
Guest(s): Thanh Bui, Oksana Nikiforova & Vasily Anokhin

Individual judges scores in charts below (given in parentheses) are listed in this order from left to right: Nguyễn Quang Dũng - Khánh Thi - Đức Huy - Chí Anh. The results of the voting is combined with the ranking of the panel of judges, and the celebrities have the higher scores in total survive.

Performing order

Couple	Jury		Audience		Total (1:1)	Style	Music
Couple	Score	#	Vote (%)	#	Total (1:1)	Style	Music
Nguyên Vũ & Petya	38 (9,10,10,9)	5	16.44	2	7	Pasodoble	– composed by Don Davis from The Matrix
Thu Minh & Lacho	36 (9,10,9,8)	3	16.78	4	7	Cha-Cha-Cha	"Corazón De Melao" – Emmanuel
Thủy Tiên & Petyo	35 (10,9,8,8)	1	33.88	5	6	Jive	"Girlfriend" – Avril Lavigne
Anh Khoa & Iva	38 (10,9,9,10)	5	16.61	3	8	Jive	"Only You" – Jungle James
Thanh Thúy & Aleks	36 (9,9,9,9)	3	16.29	1	4	Rumba	"My Heart Will Go On" – Celine Dion from Titanic
Top 5 couples	do not score					Viennese Waltz	"When a Man Loves a Woman" – Percy Sledge

=== Week 9 ===
Air date: June 26
Location: Complex Gymnasium of Vũng Tàu
Routines: Two unlearned routines from past weeks
Performers: Hồ Trung Dũng, Dương Ánh Linh, Tiêu Châu Như Quỳnh & Tuyết Mai
Guest(s): Tiêu Châu Như Quỳnh, Minh Hằng

Individual judges scores in charts below (given in parentheses) are listed in this order from left to right: Nguyễn Quang Dũng - Khánh Thi - Đức Huy - Chí Anh. The results of the voting is combined with the ranking of the panel of judges, and the celebrities have the higher scores in total survive.

Performing order

Couple	Jury		Audience		Total (1:1)	Style	Music
Couple	Score	#	Vote (%)	#	Total (1:1)	Style	Music
Nguyên Vũ & Petya	38 (9,10,10,9)	4	18.85	2	6	English Waltz	"I Will Always Love You" – Dolly Parton
Nguyên Vũ & Petya	37 (9,10,9,9)	4	18.85	2	6	Rumba	"Right Here Waiting" – Richard Marx
Thủy Tiên & Petyo	36 (9,9,9,9)	2		4	6	Quickstep	"The Queen" – Velvet
Thủy Tiên & Petyo	36 (8,10,9,9)	2		4	6	Cha-Cha-Cha	"Telephone" – Lady Gaga feat. Beyoncé
Thu Minh & Lacho	38 (10,10,9,9)	3		3	6	Quickstep	"Hey! Pachuco!" – Royal Crown Revue from The Mask
Thu Minh & Lacho	35 (8,9,9,9)	3		3	6	Jive	"The Boy Does Nothing" – Alesha Dixon
Anh Khoa & Iva	37 (9,9,10,9)	1		1	2	Quickstep	"Dancin' Fool" – Barry Manilow
Anh Khoa & Iva	34 (8,9,9,8)	1		1	2	Cha-Cha-Cha	"Oye Como Va" – composed by Tito Puente, well performed by Santana

=== Week 10 - Finale ===
Air date: July 3
Location: Quan Ngua Sports Palace, Hanoi
Routines: Favourite routine of the season and Freestyle routine
Performers: Hồ Trung Dũng, Tiêu Châu Như Quỳnh, Lê Kim Ngân & Tuyết Mai
Guest(s): Eliminated couples, Hồ Ngọc Hà

Individual judges scores in charts below (given in parentheses) are listed in this order from left to right: Nguyễn Quang Dũng - Khánh Thi - Đức Huy - Chí Anh. The results of the voting is combined with the ranking of the panel of judges, and the celebrities have the higher scores in total survive.

Competition performances

Couple	Jury		Audience		Total (1:1)	Style	Music
Couple	Score	#	Vote (%)	#	Total (1:1)	Style	Music
Nguyên Vũ & Petya	37 (9,9,10,9)	1	7.85	1	2	Pasodoble	"Theme from Mission: Impossible" – composed by Lalo Schifrin from Mission: Impossible
Nguyên Vũ & Petya	38 (9,10,10,9)	1	7.85	1	2	Freestyle	Asian instrumental medley
Thu Minh & Lacho	40 (10,10,10,10)	3	46.13	3	6	Rumba	"Viens M'embrasser" – Julio Iglesias
Thu Minh & Lacho	39 (9,10,10,10)	3	46.13	3	6	Freestyle	"Đường cong" (English: The Curve) – originally by Thiên Vương, well known by Thu Minh (with helps from Aleks, Daniel & Tisho)
Thủy Tiên & Petyo	37 (10,9,9,9)	2	46.02	2	4	Samba	"Everything I Can't Have" – Robin Thicke
Thủy Tiên & Petyo	40 (10,10,10,10)	2	46.02	2	4	Freestyle	"Jai Ho! (You Are My Destiny)" – A.R. Rahman & Pussycat Dolls feat. Nicole Scherzinger from Slumdog Millionaire

Non-Competition performances

Order	Couple	Style	Music
1	Vĩ Văn & Anna	Foxtrot	"Singin' in the Rain" – from Hollywood Revue of 1929
2	Kim Hiền & Daniel	Rumba	"Always on My Mind" – originally by Brenda Lee, well known by Willie Nelson, Elvis Presley and later Pet Shop Boys
3	Huy Khánh & Tsveta	Rumba	"Song from a Secret Garden" – Secret Garden
4	Thu Phương & Tisho	Foxtrot	"For Once in My Life" – Stevie Wonder
5	Đại Nghĩa & Valeriya	Pasodoble	"Unstoppable" – E.S. Posthumus
6	Thanh Thúy & Aleks	Cha-Cha-Cha	"Beat It" – Michael Jackson
7	Anh Khoa & Iva	Vietnamese Folkdance	"Ngọn lửa cao nguyên" – well known by Siu Black, written by Trần Tiến
8	Hồ Ngọc Hà & Daniel	Tango	"Welcome to Burlesque" – Cher from Burlesque
8	Hồ Ngọc Hà & Daniel	Samba	"Show Me How You Burlesque" – Christina Aguilera from Burlesque

== Call-out Order ==
Order	2+3	4	5	6	7	8	9	10
1	A.Khoa & Iva	Th.Minh &M.Đức	Th.Minh & Lucho	Th.Minh & Lacho	Ng.Vũ & Petya	A.Khoa & Iva	Ng.Vũ & Petya	Th.Minh & Lacho
2	Th.Thúy & Aleks^{(W2)}	Th.Tiên & Petyo	Th.Thúy & Aleks	Th.Thúy & Aleks	Th.Minh & Lacho	Ng.Vũ & Petya	Th.Minh & Lacho	Th.Tiên & Petyo
3	Ng.Vũ & Petya^{(W3)}	H.Khánh & Tsveta	Th.Tiên & Petyo	Th.Tiên & Petyo	A.Khoa & Iva	Th.Tiên & Petyo	Th.Tiên & Petyo	Ng.Vũ & Petya
4	Đ.Nghĩa & Valeriya	Ng.Vũ & Petya	Ng.Vũ & Petya	Ng.Vũ & Petya	Th.Tiên & Petyo	Th.Minh & Lacho	A.Khoa & Iva	
5	Th.Minh & Lucho	Th.Thúy & Aleks	A.Khoa & Iva	A.Khoa & Iva	Th.Thúy & Aleks	Th.Thúy & Aleks		
6	Th.Phương & Tisho	A.Khoa & Iva	Đ.Nghĩa & Valeriya	Đ.Nghĩa & Valeriya	Đ.Nghĩa & Valeriya			
7	H.Khánh & Tsveta	Đ.Nghĩa & Valeriya	Th.Phương & Tisho	Th.Phương & Tisho				
8	Th.Tiên & Petyo	Th.Phương & Tisho	H.Khánh & Tsveta					
9	K.Hiền & Daniel	K.Hiền & Daniel						
10	V.Văn & Anna							

This couple came in first place with the judges.
This couple came in last place with the judges.
This couple came in last place with the judges and was eliminated.
This couple was eliminated.
This couple was audience's favorite of the week.
This couple came in first place with the judges and gained the most vote from audience.
This couple won the competition.
This couple came in second in the competition.
This couple came in third in the competition

== Dance Schedule ==
The celebrities and professional partners danced one of these routines for each corresponding week.

- Week 2: Cha-Cha-Cha or English Waltz
- Week 3: Freestyle Routine
- Week 4: Rumba or Quickstep
- Week 5: Tango or Jive
- Week 6: Foxtrot or Pasodoble
- Week 7: Samba and Exhibition Dance
- Week 8: Viennese Waltz and One unlearned routine from past weeks
- Week 9: Two unlearned routines from past weeks
- Finale: Favorite Dances of the Season and Freestyle Routine

== Dance Chart ==
Team	2	3	4	5	6	7		8		9		10	
Thu Minh & Lucho	Slow Waltz	Freestyle	Rumba	Tango	Pasodoble	Samba	Cha-Cha-Cha	Cha-Cha-Cha	Viennese Waltz	Quickstep	Jive	Rumba	Freestyle
Thủy Tiên & Petyo	Slow Waltz	Freestyle	Rumba	Tango	Pasodoble	Samba	Cha-Cha-Cha	Jive	Viennese Waltz	Quickstep	Cha-Cha-Cha	Samba	Freestyle
Nguyên Vũ & Petya	Cha-Cha-Cha	Freestyle	Quickstep	Jive	Foxtrot	Samba	Cha-Cha-Cha	Pasodoble	Viennese Waltz	Slow Waltz	Rumba	Pasodoble	Freestyle
Anh Khoa & Iva	Slow Waltz	Freestyle	Rumba	Tango	Pasodoble	Samba	Cha-Cha-Cha	Jive	Viennese Waltz	Quickstep	Cha-Cha-Cha		Folkdance
Thanh Thúy & Aleks	Cha-Cha-Cha	Freestyle	Quickstep	Jive	Foxtrot	Samba	Cha-Cha-Cha	Rumba	Viennese Waltz				Cha-Cha-Cha
Đại Nghĩa & Valeriya	Cha-Cha-Cha	Freestyle	Quickstep	Jive	Foxtrot	Samba	Cha-Cha-Cha		Viennese Waltz				Pasodoble
Thu Phương & Tisho	Cha-Cha-Cha	Freestyle	Quickstep	Jive	Foxtrot								Foxtrot
Huy Khánh & Tsveta	Slow Waltz	Freestyle	Rumba	Tango									Rumba
Kim Hiền & Daniel	Cha-Cha-Cha	Freestyle	Quickstep										Rumba
Vĩ Văn & Anna	Slow Waltz	Freestyle											Foxtrot

Highest scoring dance
Lowest scoring dance
Performed but not scored

1: Lachezar was absent due to suffering from chickenpox, Thu Minh temporarily teamed up with Ngô Minh Đức on Week 4.

== Guest Performances ==
Date	Performer(s)	Song(s)	Dancers
April 17, 2011	[pre-recording]	"Tico-Tico no Fubá"	All professionals
April 17, 2011	[pre-recording]	"Por una Cabeza"	Đoan Trang & all male professionals
April 17, 2011	[pre-recording]	from Carmen	Khánh Thi & Phan Hiển, Phạm Bảo Long
April 17, 2011	[pre-recording]	"Smooth Criminal"	Chí Anh & Nhã Khanh, etc.
April 17, 2011	Phạm Anh Khoa & Thủy Tiên	"Nếu điều đó xảy ra"	[none]
April 17, 2011	[pre-recording]	TBA	Huy Khánh & Vũ Thu Phương
April 17, 2011	Nguyên Vũ & Hứa Vĩ Văn	"Ngôi sao biết khóc"	[none]
April 17, 2011	[pre-recording]	"Xuân yêu thương"	Thanh Thúy & Viet's Tap
April 17, 2011	Thu Minh	"Đường cong"	[none]
April 17, 2011	[pre-recording]	TBA	Đại Nghĩa, Kim Hiền & Diddo
April 17, 2011	[pre-recording]	"Mas que Nada"	Jerswin B. Polyapoy & Anna Montserrat Poloyapoy
April 17, 2011	[pre-recording]	"Amore E Musica"	Anthony Wee Yee Chua & Anita Siow Fung Tan
April 24, 2011	Nguyễn Ngọc Anh	"Saving All My Love for You"	Daniel & Iva
May 1, 2011	Tùng Dương	"Fly Me to the Moon"	Aleks & Tsveta
May 1, 2011	[pre-recording]	TBA	Petya, Petyo, Daniel & Valeriya
May 15, 2011	Thanh Bạch	TBA	Vân Diễm & Họa Mi Junior Dancegroup
May 15, 2011	Minh Quân	"Save the Last Dance for Me"	Petyo & Petya
May 15, 2011	[pre-recording]	"TBA"	Aleks, Anna, Petya, Petyo, Tisho & Tsveta
May 22, 2011	[pre-recording]	"Come Away with Me"	Iva & Lacho, Valeriya & Aleks
May 22, 2011	Đức Tuấn	"Man of La Mancha"	Khánh Thi's Dancegroup
May 29, 2011	[pre-recording]	"Black or White"	All the professionals
May 29, 2011	Doreen Fernandez (from Philippines)	"Objection"	Aleks & Valeriya
June 5, 2011	Thanh Lam	"Killing Me Softly with His Song"	Aleks & Tsveta
June 5, 2011	[pre-recording]	"Tu Vuò Fà L'Americano"	Daniel & Tsveta, Tisho & Anna
June 19, 2011	[pre-recording]	TBA	Tisho & Valeriya, Daniel & Tsveta
June 19, 2011	Thanh Bui	"Smooth"	[none]
June 19, 2011	[pre-recording]	"It's a Pity" (Russian: Немного жаль)	Oksana Nikiforova & Vasily Anokhin
June 26, 2011	Hồ Trung Dũng	"Happy Together"	Tiêu Châu Như Quỳnh & Aleks
June 26, 2011	[pre-recording]	from Fame, the Musical"	Đoan Trang, Anna, Tsveta and Hoàng Thông Dance Group
June 26, 2011	[pre-recording]	"España cañí"	Minh Hằng & Tisho
July 03, 2011	[pre-recording]	"Welcome to Burlesque"	Hồ Ngọc Hà & Daniel
July 03, 2011	[pre-recording]	"Show Me How You Burlesque"	Hồ Ngọc Hà & Daniel
