= Linh Sơn, Thanh Hóa =

Linh Sơn Xã Linh Sơn
- Commune
- Linh Sơn commune
- Location within Vietnam
- Coordinates: 20°09′16″N 105°14′19″E
- Country: Vietnam
- Region: North Central Coast
- Province: Thanh Hóa
- Time zone: UTC+7 (UTC + 7)

Linh Sơn is a commune (xã) of Thanh Hóa Province, Vietnam.
