= Call Me by Fire Vietnam season 2 =

Call Me by Fire Vietnam 2026
- Season 2
- Hosted by: MC Anh Tuấn; Trần Ngọc
- No. of contestants: 34
- No. of episodes: 15

Release
- Original network: VTV3
- Original release: June 27 – October 10, 2026

Season chronology
- ← Previous; Season 1

The second season of Call Me by Fire Vietnam (dubbed as "Anh trai vượt ngàn chông gai 2026") is airing on VTV3 and on YeaH1 Show YouTube channel from June 27, 2026.

== Production history ==
On March 30, 2026, the producers announced the production for the second season via the show's social media page.

Starting May 5, the contestants are revealed in groups of 5 (or 4).

On May 25, all 34 "talented brothers" were revealed.

== Main crew and host ==
Main stage host: Anh Tuấn

Backstage host: Trần Ngọc

Music director: SlimV

Stage director: Đinh Hà Uyên Thư

Art director: Hứa Mẫn, Vĩ Khang

Stage light director: Phúc Nguyên

Content advisor: Nguyễn Huy Tâm

Director of photography: Trần Quốc Vương

== List of "talented brothers" ==
A total of 34 male artists (dubbed as "talented brothers") was announced starting May 5. Majority of the casts are 30 years old or older, with a few of them are younger than 30 when participated in the show, the youngest born 2002. All of the "talented brothers" have to go through the process of training and preparing to compete in the performance rounds. After 7 performance rounds (including a first stage, 5 main performance rounds and a finale), the show then determined the winning brothers to be in the final "all-rounded family".

Below is the list of all 34 male artists competing in the second season:

- ALL-ROUNDED FAMILY Talented brothers joining the "all-rounder family".
- TOP n Talented brothers who did not join the "all-rounder family" in the finale.
- ELIMINATED Eliminated talented brothers and their respective performance round elimination.

Talented brother	Occupation	Year of birth	Years active	Final result
Thái VG	Rapper	1983	30	
Thanh Duy	Singer	1986	19	
Thỏ (Rabbit Run of Da LAB)	Singer-songwriter/Rapper	1987	20	
Trịnh Thăng Bình	Singer-songwriter	1988	20	
Hoàng Tôn	Singer-songwriter/Music producer	1988	13	
Thơm (JGKiD of Da LAB)	Singer-songwriter/Rapper	1989	8	
Jun Phạm	Singer/Actor	1989	16	
Đinh Mạnh Ninh	Singer-songwriter	1989	18	
Will 365	Singer/Actor	1989	16	
Mew Amazing	Singer-songwriter/Music producer	1990	12	
BB Trần	Actor	1990	17	
Hoàng Rob	Violinist	1991	11	
Thuận Nguyễn	Actor/Model	1992	15	
Huỳnh Lập	Actor/Filmmaker	1993	14	
Đông Hùng	Singer	1993	14	
It's Charles.	Singer-songwriter/Music producer	1994	8	
Duy Khánh ZhouZhou	Actor/MC	1995	18	
Cheng	Singer-songwriter	1995	8	
K.O Uni5	Singer/Rapper	1995	11	
Hoàng Dũng	Singer-songwriter	1995	11	
OSAD	Rapper	1997	8	
Hồ Đông Quan	Singer	1999	5	
Thái Lê Minh Hiếu	Singer/Model	2002	5	
Hà An Huy	Singer-songwriter	2002	5	
Tùng Mint	Dancer/Actor	1986	17	ELIMINATED (R4)
Toki Thành Thỏ	Singer/Rapper	1993	2	ELIMINATED (R4)
Neko Lê	Director	1990	17	ELIMINATED (R3)
Phùng Minh Cương	Circus performer	2002	13	ELIMINATED (R3)
Đại Nghĩa	Actor/MC	1978	26	ELIMINATED (R3)
Nguyễn Văn Chung	Singer-songwriter	1983	23	ELIMINATED (R3)
Lê Xuân Tiền	Actor/Model	1996	10	ELIMINATED (R2)
Vương Anh Tú	Singer-songwriter	1989	20	ELIMINATED (R1)
14 Casper	Singer-songwriter/Music producer	1999	8	ELIMINATED (R1)
Dũng DT	Screenwriter/Actor/MC	1981	25	QUIT (R1) (Note: On July 10th 2026, Dũng DT announced his withdrawal from the show due to personal reasons.)

== Show’s content ==
=== First stage: Nowadays, nowadays ===
This is the first stage for the “talented brothers” upon joining the show, taking the form of a head-to-head battle instead of a concert night like in the first season. Here, the 34 brothers are divided into ten different groups of 3, 4 or 5 members, with pairs of groups competing against each other in each round. Members of each group take turns performing their solo acts, followed by a joint group performance. The groups are given 48 hours to prepare before taking the stage. A studio audience of 350 votes for the talents after each group's performance, and the group with the higher score emerges victorious. At the end of the night, the audience votes for their top three favorite brothers, with each audience vote equaling 10 "firepower" points.

First stage
Battling pairs	Team [English translation]	Members	Individual song [English translation] (Songwriter/composer)	Group song [English translation] (Songwriter/composer)	Results	Voting points	Personal “firepower” points
Episode 1 (June 27th 2026)
1	Anh tài lắm chiêu [Tricky brothers]	Mew Amazing	"Ừ thì" [Yes, and] (Mew Amazing)	"Mắt nai cha cha cha" [Deer eye cha cha cha] (Sỹ Luân, Mew Amazing)	Won	1650	340
1	Anh tài lắm chiêu [Tricky brothers]	Huỳnh Lập	"Làm được nha!" (Note: Original title is "Vậy coi được không?" by Bùi Công Nam và Huỳnh Lập.)[Can do it!] (Bùi Công Nam, Huỳnh Lập, Chí Tâm)	"Mắt nai cha cha cha" [Deer eye cha cha cha] (Sỹ Luân, Mew Amazing)	Won	1650	350
1	Anh tài lắm chiêu [Tricky brothers]	Đại Nghĩa	"Kim" (Y Vũ, Cao Minh Thu)	"Mắt nai cha cha cha" [Deer eye cha cha cha] (Sỹ Luân, Mew Amazing)	Won	1650	180
1	Tình đầu rực cháy [Burning first love]	Hồ Đông Quan	"Rắc rối" [Trouble] (Quentin Danko, Giiza, Adib Sin, Minh Đinh, Banh, Hưng Đoàn)	"Chạm làn môi em" [Touch your lips] (Hoàng Tôn, Andree Right Hand, Tinle, Will, Toki Thành Thỏ, K.O, Hồ Đông Quan)	Lost	1350	210
1	Tình đầu rực cháy [Burning first love]	K.O	"Xin hãy rời xa" [Please go away] (Đỗ Hiếu, K.O)	"Chạm làn môi em" [Touch your lips] (Hoàng Tôn, Andree Right Hand, Tinle, Will, Toki Thành Thỏ, K.O, Hồ Đông Quan)	Lost	1350	110
1	Tình đầu rực cháy [Burning first love]	Toki Thành Thỏ	"Hãy khóc trên vai anh" [Please cry on my shoulders] (Tùng Maru)	"Chạm làn môi em" [Touch your lips] (Hoàng Tôn, Andree Right Hand, Tinle, Will, Toki Thành Thỏ, K.O, Hồ Đông Quan)	Lost	1350	330
1	Tình đầu rực cháy [Burning first love]	Will	"Điều gì" & "Nơi ta chờ em" [What & Where I'll wait for you] (Coldie, Rhymastic)	"Chạm làn môi em" [Touch your lips] (Hoàng Tôn, Andree Right Hand, Tinle, Will, Toki Thành Thỏ, K.O, Hồ Đông Quan)	Lost	1350	120
2	Quái kiệt mộng mơ [Dreamy prodigies]	Thỏ (Da LAB)	"Bản tình ca không tên" [Untitled love song] (Thỏ (Da LAB))	"Vỡ tan" [Broken] (Trịnh Thăng Bình, Thỏ (Da LAB))	Lost	1450	270
2	Quái kiệt mộng mơ [Dreamy prodigies]	Hà An Huy	" ' Nhức tiềm thức |" [Subconscious pain] (Hà An Huy)	"Vỡ tan" [Broken] (Trịnh Thăng Bình, Thỏ (Da LAB))	Lost	1450	320
2	Quái kiệt mộng mơ [Dreamy prodigies]	Trịnh Thăng Bình	"Người ấy" [That person] (Trịnh Thăng Bình)	"Vỡ tan" [Broken] (Trịnh Thăng Bình, Thỏ (Da LAB))	Lost	1450	150
2	Những kẻ lãng du [The wanderers]	Đinh Mạnh Ninh	"Xe đạp” (Note: Original title is "Sakurairo Mau Koro" by Mika Nakashima.)[Bicycle] (Minako Kawae, Đinh Mạnh Ninh)	"Vào hạ" [Into the summer] (Lê Hựu Hà)	Won	1510	290
2	Những kẻ lãng du [The wanderers]	Thơm (Da LAB)	"Em tôi đôi mươi" [My young baby] (Thơm (Da LAB))	"Vào hạ" [Into the summer] (Lê Hựu Hà)	Won	1510	280
2	Những kẻ lãng du [The wanderers]	Dũng DT	"Cho anh xin số nhà" [Can I have your house number] (Trần Thiện Thanh)	"Vào hạ" [Into the summer] (Lê Hựu Hà)	Won	1510	130
Episode 2 (July 4th 2026)
3	Anh tài hào hoa [Charming brothers]	Thuận Nguyễn	"Keep Me In Love" (Đỗ Hiếu)	"Tình nhân ơi" [Oh my love] (Châu Đăng Khoa, Phú Luân)	Lost	1300	290
3	Anh tài hào hoa [Charming brothers]	Tùng Mint	"Cause I Love You" (Đỗ Hiếu)	"Tình nhân ơi" [Oh my love] (Châu Đăng Khoa, Phú Luân)	Lost	1300	190
3	Anh tài hào hoa [Charming brothers]	Lê Xuân Tiền	"Đường cong" [Curve] (Nguyễn Hải Phong, Phú Luân)	"Tình nhân ơi" [Oh my love] (Châu Đăng Khoa, Phú Luân)	Lost	1300	280
3	Anh tài nội lực [Brothers with inner strength]	Phùng Minh Cương	"Chờ người nơi ấy" [Wait for you at that place] (Huy Tuấn, Hà Quang Minh)	"Tháng Tư là lời nói dối của em" [April is your lies] (Phạm Toàn Thắng)	Won	1680	230
3	Anh tài nội lực [Brothers with inner strength]	Đông Hùng	"Những bàn chân lặng lẽ" [Silent footsteps] (Vũ Thảo)	"Tháng Tư là lời nói dối của em" [April is your lies] (Phạm Toàn Thắng)	Won	1680	260
3	Anh tài nội lực [Brothers with inner strength]	Hoàng Rob	"Hoa đào" [Peach blossom] (Hồ Hoài Anh, Hà Quang Minh, Hoàng Rob, Kent Trần)	"Tháng Tư là lời nói dối của em" [April is your lies] (Phạm Toàn Thắng)	Won	1680	140
4	Anh chàng nhà bên [Boy next door]	OSAD	"Đang yêu" [In Love] (OSAD, BeepBeepChild, Thiên Ngôn, Wishty Eazy (FirstGene), Siman)	"Move On" (Hoàng Tôn, OSAD, Thái Lê Minh Hiếu, Melyd K, GRVITY)	Won	1500	120
4	Anh chàng nhà bên [Boy next door]	Thái Lê Minh Hiếu	"Rơi vào tình yêu" [Fall into love] (August (Fillinus), AnNgo (Fillinus), Wongcoustic (Fillinus))	"Move On" (Hoàng Tôn, OSAD, Thái Lê Minh Hiếu, Melyd K, GRVITY)	Won	1500	340
4	Anh chàng nhà bên [Boy next door]	Hoàng Tôn	"Em không quay về" [You're not coming back] (Hoàng Tôn)	"Move On" (Hoàng Tôn, OSAD, Thái Lê Minh Hiếu, Melyd K, GRVITY)	Won	1500	350
4	Tổ đội sóng ngầm [Underground crew]	Cheng	"Zung zăng zung zẻ" (Cheng, Vũ Hoàng Linh)	"Dạt vào tim em" [Drag into your heart] (Thái VG, It's CHARLES., Cheng, Kriss Ngô)	Lost	1480	270
4	Tổ đội sóng ngầm [Underground crew]	It's CHARLES.	"Dear" (It's CHARLES., Gonzo, SlimV)	"Dạt vào tim em" [Drag into your heart] (Thái VG, It's CHARLES., Cheng, Kriss Ngô)	Lost	1480	150
4	Tổ đội sóng ngầm [Underground crew]	Thái VG	"My Calm" (Thái VG, JayD, DJ Feliks)	"Dạt vào tim em" [Drag into your heart] (Thái VG, It's CHARLES., Cheng, Kriss Ngô)	Lost	1480	350
5	Biệt đội tái xuất [Comeback team]	Neko Lê	"Do U See" (Neko Lê, Teddi, Vietdrake)	"Xin hãy thứ tha" [Please forgive] (Dương Khắc Linh, Hoàng Huy Long, Thanh Duy, Neko Lê)	Win	1660	250
5	Biệt đội tái xuất [Comeback team]	BB Trần	"Không lối thoát" [No escape] (Kilian, CM1X)	"Xin hãy thứ tha" [Please forgive] (Dương Khắc Linh, Hoàng Huy Long, Thanh Duy, Neko Lê)	Win	1660	490
5	Biệt đội tái xuất [Comeback team]	Thanh Duy	"Tinh tú cầu" [Hydrangea] (Thanh Duy, Lý Anh Khoa, Gloria Gaynor (Note: Song uses sample from "I Will Survive".))	"Xin hãy thứ tha" [Please forgive] (Dương Khắc Linh, Hoàng Huy Long, Thanh Duy, Neko Lê)	Win	1660	390
5	Biệt đội tái xuất [Comeback team]	Duy Khánh	"Không vừa ý" [Unsatified] (Tia Hải Châu, Monotape, Quanium)	"Xin hãy thứ tha" [Please forgive] (Dương Khắc Linh, Hoàng Huy Long, Thanh Duy, Neko Lê)	Win	1660	460
5	Biệt đội tái xuất [Comeback team]	Jun Phạm	"1%" (Mew Amazing, Monotape)	"Xin hãy thứ tha" [Please forgive] (Dương Khắc Linh, Hoàng Huy Long, Thanh Duy, Neko Lê)	Win	1660	480
5	Anh tài tình [Lovely brothers]	14 Casper	"Một đời" & "Người tốt nhất cho em" [A life & The best person for you] (Bon Nghiêm, 14 Casper)	"Nàng thơ" [Muse] (Hoàng Dũng, Vương Anh Tú, 14 Casper)	Lost	1340	110
5	Anh tài tình [Lovely brothers]	Nguyễn Văn Chung	"Anh say rồi" [I'm drunk] (Nguyễn Văn Chung)	"Nàng thơ" [Muse] (Hoàng Dũng, Vương Anh Tú, 14 Casper)	Lost	1340	170
5	Anh tài tình [Lovely brothers]	Vương Anh Tú	"Nếu có thế giới song song" [If there is an alternate world] (Vương Anh Tú, Aaron Hoàn, Phúc Anh)	"Nàng thơ" [Muse] (Hoàng Dũng, Vương Anh Tú, 14 Casper)	Lost	1340	120
5	Anh tài tình [Lovely brothers]	Hoàng Dũng	"Nửa thập kỷ" & "Ba mươi cái chớp mắt" [Half a decade & Thirty blinks] (Hoàng Dũng)	"Nàng thơ" [Muse] (Hoàng Dũng, Vương Anh Tú, 14 Casper)	Lost	1340	420
SP	Anh trai vượt ngàn chông gai 2026's cast		"Hỏa tâm" [Fiery heart] (Thái VG, Neko Lê, It's CHARLES., Cheng, OSAD, Touliver, GRVITY, SlimV)				

- The personal "firepower" points of the MVP brother
- The winning team's points

=== First performance round: The man on the horse ===
In the first performance round, the talents entered the team and song selection process to form their respective "houses." Based on individual scores and match results from the reunion performance round, the show identified five MVPs. These were the five brothers with the highest scores from the five winning teams. The five MVP of this round are Hoàng Tôn, Đinh Mạnh Ninh, BB Trần, Huỳnh Lập, and Đông Hùng.

The first performance round featured seven available songs and one "X-Song"—where the brothers have to write an entire new song—divided into lineups of three, four, and five members. The five MVPs had the privilege of entering first, freely choosing the song lineup they desired. After the MVPs completed their selections, the remaining 29 brothers entered the houses one by one, based on their individual "firepower" score rankings. The first brother to step into the position of a specific song would become the leader (captain) of that house. Afterwards, the newly formed houses were split into two groups, White Horse (Bạch Mã) and Black Horse (Hắc Mã), with four houses in each group and the White Horse group performing first. Based on the average individual “firepower” points of their members, the two highest-ranked houses were designated as Knights (Hiệp Sĩ) and distributed evenly between the two groups, while the remaining houses were classified as Horsemen. The Knight house with the highest “firepower” score had first priority in choosing its preferred group. For the Horseman (Kỵ Sĩ) houses, those ranked 6th to 8th chose their positions first, while those ranked 3rd to 5th chose later and had the right to displace lower-ranked houses (6th to 8th) from their previously selected spots. In each selection round, if two or more houses competed for the same group spot using their combat rights, priority was given to the house with the higher average Firepower score. Additionally, the two Knight houses were stationed in a private room and granted a single "avoidance right" throughout the grouping process to either protect their spot or alter the situation when needed. During Round 1, the talents performed their chosen songs on stage, and the 300 studio audience members voted immediately after each performance ended. A benchmark score was set after the first house performed, while the scores of the remaining houses were kept secret, disclosing only whether they passed the benchmark to lead the group. At the end of the night, audience members voted for up to three individual talents. Based on the total vote tally, only one house in each group won and kept its members safe, while the other houses entered the danger zone and faced the risk of elimination. At the conclusion of Round 1, the two talents who had to bid farewell to the show were Vương Anh Tú and 14 Casper.

First performance round
Order	House's name [English translation]	Performance song [English translation] (Songwriter/Composer)	Members	Voting points	Personal "firepower" points	Result
Episode 3 – Round 1 – White Horse group (July 18th 2026)
1	Mỹ nam [Handsome]	"Buông tay" [Releasing hand] (Huy Nam (La Thăng), Kelvin Khánh (La Thăng))	BB Trần	2110	300	Advanced
1	Mỹ nam [Handsome]	"Buông tay" [Releasing hand] (Huy Nam (La Thăng), Kelvin Khánh (La Thăng))	Thuận Nguyễn	2110	170	Advanced
1	Mỹ nam [Handsome]	"Buông tay" [Releasing hand] (Huy Nam (La Thăng), Kelvin Khánh (La Thăng))	Toki Thành Thỏ	2110	220	Advanced
1	Mỹ nam [Handsome]	"Buông tay" [Releasing hand] (Huy Nam (La Thăng), Kelvin Khánh (La Thăng))	Duy Khánh	2110	350	Advanced
1	Mỹ nam [Handsome]	"Buông tay" [Releasing hand] (Huy Nam (La Thăng), Kelvin Khánh (La Thăng))	Lê Xuân Tiền	2110	270	Advanced
2	Ngoại ô [Suburban]	"Xa" [Far] (Oringchains)	Dũng DT		—N/a	Quit
2	Ngoại ô [Suburban]	"Xa" [Far] (Oringchains)	Đông Hùng		220	Advanced
2	Ngoại ô [Suburban]	"Xa" [Far] (Oringchains)	K.O		180	Advanced
2	Ngoại ô [Suburban]	"Xa" [Far] (Oringchains)	14 Casper		110	Eliminated
3	Củi lửa [Firewood]	"Quá khứ còn lại gì" [What is even left in the past] (Vũ Minh Tâm)	Đại Nghĩa		160	Advanced
3	Củi lửa [Firewood]	"Quá khứ còn lại gì" [What is even left in the past] (Vũ Minh Tâm)	Trịnh Thăng Bình		180	Advanced
3	Củi lửa [Firewood]	"Quá khứ còn lại gì" [What is even left in the past] (Vũ Minh Tâm)	Đinh Mạnh Ninh		150	Advanced
3	Củi lửa [Firewood]	"Quá khứ còn lại gì" [What is even left in the past] (Vũ Minh Tâm)	Will		260	Advanced
3	Củi lửa [Firewood]	"Quá khứ còn lại gì" [What is even left in the past] (Vũ Minh Tâm)	It's CHARLES.		200	Advanced
4	Làm mạnh [Go hard]	"Nhong nhong nhong" (Thế Hiển)	Thái VG		320	Advanced
4	Làm mạnh [Go hard]	"Nhong nhong nhong" (Thế Hiển)	Huỳnh Lập		210	Advanced
4	Làm mạnh [Go hard]	"Nhong nhong nhong" (Thế Hiển)	Thái Lê Minh Hiếu		310	Advanced
Episode 4 – Round 1 – Black Horse group (25 tháng 7 năm 2026)
1	Vinh quy bái tổ [Paying respect to the ancestors]	"Lý ngựa ô" [Dark horse] (Southern Vietnamese folk)	Thanh Duy	2150	400	Advanced
1	Vinh quy bái tổ [Paying respect to the ancestors]	"Lý ngựa ô" [Dark horse] (Southern Vietnamese folk)	Jun Phạm	2150	550	Advanced
1	Vinh quy bái tổ [Paying respect to the ancestors]	"Lý ngựa ô" [Dark horse] (Southern Vietnamese folk)	Mew Amazing	2150	360	Advanced
2	Điện ảnh [Cinematic]	"Anh sẽ đến cùng cơn mưa” [I will arrive with the rain] (Hứa Kim Tuyền, Jase, TDK)	Nguyễn Văn Chung		130	Advanced
2	Điện ảnh [Cinematic]	"Anh sẽ đến cùng cơn mưa” [I will arrive with the rain] (Hứa Kim Tuyền, Jase, TDK)	Tùng Mint		120	Advanced
2	Điện ảnh [Cinematic]	"Anh sẽ đến cùng cơn mưa” [I will arrive with the rain] (Hứa Kim Tuyền, Jase, TDK)	Neko Lê		210	Advanced
2	Điện ảnh [Cinematic]	"Anh sẽ đến cùng cơn mưa” [I will arrive with the rain] (Hứa Kim Tuyền, Jase, TDK)	Phùng Minh Cương		190	Advanced
3	Soạn nhạc [Songwriting]	X-Song (Note: The brothers have to write an entire new song from scratch): ”Nợ em cả bầu trời” [Owed you the whole sky] (Thỏ (Da LAB), Hoàng Tôn, OSAD, Hồ Đông Quan, Hà An Huy, Melyd K, BeepBeepChild, Duy Sơn)	Thỏ (Da LAB)		170	Advanced
3	Soạn nhạc [Songwriting]	X-Song: ”Nợ em cả bầu trời” [Owed you the whole sky] (Thỏ (Da LAB), Hoàng Tôn, OSAD, Hồ Đông Quan, Hà An Huy, Melyd K, BeepBeepChild, Duy Sơn)	Hoàng Tôn		200	Advanced
3	Soạn nhạc [Songwriting]	X-Song: ”Nợ em cả bầu trời” [Owed you the whole sky] (Thỏ (Da LAB), Hoàng Tôn, OSAD, Hồ Đông Quan, Hà An Huy, Melyd K, BeepBeepChild, Duy Sơn)	OSAD		180	Advanced
3	Soạn nhạc [Songwriting]	X-Song: ”Nợ em cả bầu trời” [Owed you the whole sky] (Thỏ (Da LAB), Hoàng Tôn, OSAD, Hồ Đông Quan, Hà An Huy, Melyd K, BeepBeepChild, Duy Sơn)	Hồ Đông Quan		250	Advanced
3	Soạn nhạc [Songwriting]	X-Song: ”Nợ em cả bầu trời” [Owed you the whole sky] (Thỏ (Da LAB), Hoàng Tôn, OSAD, Hồ Đông Quan, Hà An Huy, Melyd K, BeepBeepChild, Duy Sơn)	Hà An Huy		290	Advanced
4	Hoa lửa [Firey flowers]	"let me go" (KIMLONG)	Thơm (Da LAB)		370	Advanced
4	Hoa lửa [Firey flowers]	"let me go" (KIMLONG)	Vương Anh Tú		80	Eliminated
4	Hoa lửa [Firey flowers]	"let me go" (KIMLONG)	Hoàng Rob		160	Advanced
4	Hoa lửa [Firey flowers]	"let me go" (KIMLONG)	Cheng		260	Advanced
4	Hoa lửa [Firey flowers]	"let me go" (KIMLONG)	Hoàng Dũng		350	Advanced

- House captain.

=== Second performance round: Crossing the Shadow and Light ===
Before Performance 2 began, the talented brothers formed new houses by expanding the rosters of the two winning houses from Performance 1. The incumbent leaders, Huỳnh Lập and Hoàng Tôn, retained their leadership roles. The remaining two leaders were chosen based on the "MVP" title awarded to the highest-scoring brothers from the winning houses: Thái VG (Làm Mạnh House) and Hà An Huy (Soạn Nhạc House). The leaders then recruited members through two draft rounds:

- Round 1: The two "MVP" leaders (Thái VG and Hà An Huy) negotiated directly with any two talents using invitation cards. After 10 minutes, they officially invited their chosen members. In the second turn, the incumbent leaders (Huỳnh Lập and Hoàng Tôn) each selected one talent. Any talent called in this turn was required to join the house without the right to refuse.
- Round 2: All four leaders negotiated with unassigned talents in the common room for 10 minutes, then returned to the conference room to submit cards for their desired recruits. Selected talents could move to the conference room to officially team up or remain in the common room to decline (up to two refusals per person). If two or more leaders selected the same talent, those leaders forfeited their turn. This process continued until houses reached eight members, except House Thám Hiểm, which completed its roster with seven.

After formation, the houses auctioned and selected songs in two rounds: an open auction for performance tracks and a closed auction for vocal tracks. Before the stage show, a mid-point check-in (the "Fire Test") was held before 42 audience members to evaluate preparation and prop handling. Based on votes, Chiến Mã Hoise and Hiển Nhiên House received red cards for scoring lowest, forcing them into a card-clearing round on performance night. The test also determined matchup pairings and stage order for the first battle round, with the second round's order set by the outcomes of the first. Performance 2 featured two competing rounds:

- Card-Clearing Round: Chiến Mã House and Hiển Nhiên House each sent one representative for a solo vocal battle. Studio audience votes determined the winner, who cleared their card to gain temporary safety, while the losing house retained its card and faced a larger disadvantage.
- House Battles: Each house presented a vocal and a performance item. Each heat featured four acts across two matchup pairs, with audience voting after each pair. Houses set their lineups so every member performed in exactly one act. Additionally, one act per house required prop-based interaction designed by the talents within a 3-meter spotlight beam, while the other act featured minimal props.

Based on combined scores across both acts, the top two houses secured safety and preserved their entire lineups, while the bottom two entered the danger zone. If the red-card house failed to reach the overall top two, it faced an immediate elimination. At the conclusion of Performance 2, Long Mã House and Chiến Mã House achieved safety, while Lê Xuân Tiền was the sole brother eliminated.

Episode 6 – Second performance round – Part 1 (August 8th 2026)
Card-clearing Round
Order	Houses	Performing song (Songwriter/Composer)	Members		Battle points		Results
1	Hiển nhiên [Obviously]	"Giã từ dĩ vãng" [Farewell to the past] (Nguyễn Đức Trung)	Đinh Mạnh Ninh		2040		Successful
2	Chiến mã [Warhorses]	"Giọt nắng bên thềm" [Sunbeam near the doorstep] (Thanh Tùng)	Hà An Huy		1390		Failed
Duel round
Order	Houses	Performing songs (Songwriter/Composer)	Members	First points		Personal “firepower” points	Results
1	Thám hiểm [Explorers]	X-Song: "Sao phải xoắn" [Why need to worry?] (K.O, OSAD, Hồ Đông Quan, BeepBeepChild)	K.O	930		360	Advanced
1	Thám hiểm [Explorers]	X-Song: "Sao phải xoắn" [Why need to worry?] (K.O, OSAD, Hồ Đông Quan, BeepBeepChild)	OSAD	930		290	Advanced
1	Thám hiểm [Explorers]	X-Song: "Sao phải xoắn" [Why need to worry?] (K.O, OSAD, Hồ Đông Quan, BeepBeepChild)	Hồ Đông Quan	930		310	Advanced
2	Chiến mã [Warhorses]	"Em chỉ im lặng" [You only silent] (OSAD, Nhật Nguyễn, Hồ, Minh Đinh, Trịnh Thăng Bình, Hà An Huy)	Trịnh Thăng Bình	2500		330	Advanced
2	Chiến mã [Warhorses]	"Em chỉ im lặng" [You only silent] (OSAD, Nhật Nguyễn, Hồ, Minh Đinh, Trịnh Thăng Bình, Hà An Huy)	Thuận Nguyễn	2500		200	Advanced
2	Chiến mã [Warhorses]	"Em chỉ im lặng" [You only silent] (OSAD, Nhật Nguyễn, Hồ, Minh Đinh, Trịnh Thăng Bình, Hà An Huy)	Phùng Minh Cương	2500		90	Advanced
2	Chiến mã [Warhorses]	"Em chỉ im lặng" [You only silent] (OSAD, Nhật Nguyễn, Hồ, Minh Đinh, Trịnh Thăng Bình, Hà An Huy)	Hà An Huy	2500		650	Advanced
3	Long mã	"Ánh sáng của đời tôi" [Light of my life] (Minh Châu, Thái VG, Hoàng Dũng)	Thái VG	2230		200	Advanced
3	Long mã	"Ánh sáng của đời tôi" [Light of my life] (Minh Châu, Thái VG, Hoàng Dũng)	Jun Phạm	2230		840	Advanced
3	Long mã	"Ánh sáng của đời tôi" [Light of my life] (Minh Châu, Thái VG, Hoàng Dũng)	Hoàng Rob	2230		270	Advanced
3	Long mã	"Ánh sáng của đời tôi" [Light of my life] (Minh Châu, Thái VG, Hoàng Dũng)	Hoàng Dũng	2230		370	Advanced
4	Hiển nhiên [Obviously]	"Trước khi em tồn tại" [Before you existed] (Thắng, Huỳnh Lập, Cheng)	Neko Lê	1200		620	Advanced
4	Hiển nhiên [Obviously]	"Trước khi em tồn tại" [Before you existed] (Thắng, Huỳnh Lập, Cheng)	Huỳnh Lập	1200		150	Advanced
4	Hiển nhiên [Obviously]	"Trước khi em tồn tại" [Before you existed] (Thắng, Huỳnh Lập, Cheng)	Cheng	1200		300	Advanced
4	Hiển nhiên [Obviously]	"Trước khi em tồn tại" [Before you existed] (Thắng, Huỳnh Lập, Cheng)	Thái Lê Minh Hiếu	1200		390	Advanced
Episode 7 – Second performance round – Part 2 (August 15th 2026)
Order	Houses	Performing songs (Songwriter/Composer)	Members	Second points	Total points	Personal “firepower” points	Results
1	Long mã	"Mời buồn sang chơi" [Inviting sadness over to play] (Châu Đăng Khoa, Mew Amazing, It's CHARLES.)	Tùng Mint	1710	3940	40	Advanced
1	Long mã	"Mời buồn sang chơi" [Inviting sadness over to play] (Châu Đăng Khoa, Mew Amazing, It's CHARLES.)	Mew Amazing	1710	3940	290	Advanced
1	Long mã	"Mời buồn sang chơi" [Inviting sadness over to play] (Châu Đăng Khoa, Mew Amazing, It's CHARLES.)	Đông Hùng	1710	3940	200	Advanced
1	Long mã	"Mời buồn sang chơi" [Inviting sadness over to play] (Châu Đăng Khoa, Mew Amazing, It's CHARLES.)	It's CHARLES.	1710	3940	170	Advanced
2	Thám hiểm [Explorers]	"Người về nơi đâu" [Where have you gone?] (Phạm Thanh Hà, Thỏ (Da LAB), Hoàng Tôn, Thơm (Da LAB))	Thỏ (Da LAB)	1690	2620	100	Advanced
2	Thám hiểm [Explorers]	"Người về nơi đâu" [Where have you gone?] (Phạm Thanh Hà, Thỏ (Da LAB), Hoàng Tôn, Thơm (Da LAB))	Hoàng Tôn	1690	2620	150	Advanced
2	Thám hiểm [Explorers]	"Người về nơi đâu" [Where have you gone?] (Phạm Thanh Hà, Thỏ (Da LAB), Hoàng Tôn, Thơm (Da LAB))	Thơm (Da LAB)	1690	2620	320	Advanced
2	Thám hiểm [Explorers]	"Người về nơi đâu" [Where have you gone?] (Phạm Thanh Hà, Thỏ (Da LAB), Hoàng Tôn, Thơm (Da LAB))	Lê Xuân Tiền	1690	2620	90	Eliminated
3	Chiến mã [Warhorses]	"Chim sáo ngày xưa" [] (Nhất Sinh, Đại Nghĩa, Nguyễn Văn Chung)	Đại Nghĩa	1710	4210	120	Advanced
3	Chiến mã [Warhorses]	"Chim sáo ngày xưa" [] (Nhất Sinh, Đại Nghĩa, Nguyễn Văn Chung)	Nguyễn Văn Chung	1710	4210	170	Advanced
3	Chiến mã [Warhorses]	"Chim sáo ngày xưa" [] (Nhất Sinh, Đại Nghĩa, Nguyễn Văn Chung)	Thanh Duy	1710	4210	600	Advanced
3	Chiến mã [Warhorses]	"Chim sáo ngày xưa" [] (Nhất Sinh, Đại Nghĩa, Nguyễn Văn Chung)	BB Trần	1710	4210	590	Advanced
4	Hiển nhiên [Obviously]	"Tan biến" [Fade away] (Nguyễn Hải Phong, Đinh Mạnh Ninh, Will, Toki Thành Thỏ)	Đinh Mạnh Ninh	1680	2880	460	Advanced
4	Hiển nhiên [Obviously]	"Tan biến" [Fade away] (Nguyễn Hải Phong, Đinh Mạnh Ninh, Will, Toki Thành Thỏ)	Will	1680	2880	610	Advanced
4	Hiển nhiên [Obviously]	"Tan biến" [Fade away] (Nguyễn Hải Phong, Đinh Mạnh Ninh, Will, Toki Thành Thỏ)	Toki Thành Thỏ	1680	2880	160	Advanced
4	Hiển nhiên [Obviously]	"Tan biến" [Fade away] (Nguyễn Hải Phong, Đinh Mạnh Ninh, Will, Toki Thành Thỏ)	Duy Khánh	1680	2880	640	Advanced

- Brothers who are house leaders.
- Brothers who are the MVPs of the round.

=== Third performance round: The wooden carousel ===
Before starting Performance 3, the brothers formed new lineups consisting of six 5-member teams. The process began with a special recruitment round to determine six team leaders. Eight candidates were identified: two "MVPs" from Performance 2 based on competition results (Jun Phạm and Hà An Huy), and six nominated by the remaining members (Thái VG, Will, Mew Amazing, Huỳnh Lập, Cheng, and Hoàng Dũng). These candidates negotiated to persuade 13 free brothera with the highest personal firepower points to join their teams. The first six candidates to recruit two members from this free-agent group and strike the gong were named team leaders, while the remaining two candidates returned to the free-agent pool. Ultimately, Thái VG, Mew Amazing, Huỳnh Lập, Cheng, Hoàng Dũng, and Hà An Huy became the leaders for Performance 3. The leaders then negotiated with the remaining talents to complete their rosters; formation was successful once a leader recruited all needed members and struck the gong in the conference room. Đại Nghĩa, who was absent from the studio, was contacted by phone by interested teams.

Once formed, teams auctioned for selection priority among six demo tracks (X-Songs) for the Pursuit Match. The first three picks were determined via open auction, while the next two were decided by blind bidding. Based on the total personal firepower points of their members, the six teams were split into two tiers—"Trạng nguyên" (Top Tier) and "Thám hoa" (Third Tier)—to select target teams for pursuit. For the Combined Match, the two alliances performed vocal tracks assigned to each; the alliance with higher remaining post-auction firepower points earned the right to select their song or performance order. During Performance 3, all teams competed in two matches:

- Pursuit Match: The six teams performed new songs in a round-robin format ("pursuit"), where the score of the preceding team set the benchmark for the next. The 1st team pursued the 2nd, the 2nd pursued the 3rd, and so on, until the 6th team pursued the 1st. Audiences voted after each act. Scores were determined by performance firepower points earned, plus bonuses or penalties based on pursuit outcomes. Success added 60 points to a "Trạng nguyên" team or 40 points to a "Thám hoa" team. Failure deducted 30 points from a "Trạng nguyên" team or 20 points from a "Thám hoa" team.
- Combined Match: Based on the round-robin matchup tree, teams were split into two 3-team alliances (Alliance 1: positions 1, 3, 5; Alliance 2: positions 2, 4, 6). Each team sent one representative to collaborate on a joint performance to earn points for their alliance. Audiences voted after each performance and voted for up to three favorite individual talents at the end of the show.

Final standings were calculated by combining cumulative scores from both matches and Pursuit Match component metrics. Only two teams secured safety and preserved their lineups, while the remaining four entered the danger zone. In each endangered team, the two talents with the highest personal firepower points advanced automatically. For the remaining three lowest-scoring talents, each member wrote down the names of two teammates they wished to protect; the unselected talent was eliminated. At the end of Performance 3, Team Bềnh Bồng and Team Rực Rỡ were safe, while Đại Nghĩa, Nguyễn Văn Chung, Neko Lê, and Phùng Minh Cương were eliminated.

Episode 8 – Third performance round – Part 1 (August 22nd 2026)
Pursuit match
Order	Houses	Performing songs (Songwriter/Composer)	Members	First points	Pursuit points	Total points	Personal firepower points	Results
1	Nguyên tố [Elements]	X-Song: "We Win This Game" (Toki Thành Thỏ, Duy Khánh, Cheng, K.O, Quanium)	Toki Thành Thỏ	2290	–20	4800	280	Advanced
1	Nguyên tố [Elements]	X-Song: "We Win This Game" (Toki Thành Thỏ, Duy Khánh, Cheng, K.O, Quanium)	Duy Khánh	2290	–20	4800	510	Advanced
1	Nguyên tố [Elements]	X-Song: "We Win This Game" (Toki Thành Thỏ, Duy Khánh, Cheng, K.O, Quanium)	Cheng	2290	–20	4800	300	Advanced
1	Nguyên tố [Elements]	X-Song: "We Win This Game" (Toki Thành Thỏ, Duy Khánh, Cheng, K.O, Quanium)	K.O	2290	–20	4800	410	Advanced
1	Nguyên tố [Elements]	X-Song: "We Win This Game" (Toki Thành Thỏ, Duy Khánh, Cheng, K.O, Quanium)	Phùng Minh Cương	2290	–20	4800	160	Eliminated
2	Quý tử [Precious son]	X-Song: "Một đêm duy nhất" [One night only] (Hoàng Tôn, Mew Amazing, Neko Lê, Quanium, Kriss Ngô)	Hoàng Tôn	1940	–20	4500	390	Advanced
2	Quý tử [Precious son]	X-Song: "Một đêm duy nhất" [One night only] (Hoàng Tôn, Mew Amazing, Neko Lê, Quanium, Kriss Ngô)	Mew Amazing	1940	–20	4500	330	Advanced
2	Quý tử [Precious son]	X-Song: "Một đêm duy nhất" [One night only] (Hoàng Tôn, Mew Amazing, Neko Lê, Quanium, Kriss Ngô)	Neko Lê	1940	–20	4500	380	Eliminated
2	Quý tử [Precious son]	X-Song: "Một đêm duy nhất" [One night only] (Hoàng Tôn, Mew Amazing, Neko Lê, Quanium, Kriss Ngô)	BB Trần	1940	–20	4500	400	Advanced
2	Quý tử [Precious son]	X-Song: "Một đêm duy nhất" [One night only] (Hoàng Tôn, Mew Amazing, Neko Lê, Quanium, Kriss Ngô)	Thái Lê Minh Hiếu	1940	–20	4500	400	Advanced
3	Bềnh bồng [Floating]	X-Song: "Nhỏ xíu nhỏ xiu" [Teeny-tiny Teeny-tiny] (Thơm (Da LAB), Jun Phạm, It's CHARLES., Hồ Đông Quan, BeepBeepChild)	Thơm (Da LAB)	2840	+60	5430	410	Advanced
3	Bềnh bồng [Floating]	X-Song: "Nhỏ xíu nhỏ xiu" [Teeny-tiny Teeny-tiny] (Thơm (Da LAB), Jun Phạm, It's CHARLES., Hồ Đông Quan, BeepBeepChild)	Jun Phạm	2840	+60	5430	680	Advanced
3	Bềnh bồng [Floating]	X-Song: "Nhỏ xíu nhỏ xiu" [Teeny-tiny Teeny-tiny] (Thơm (Da LAB), Jun Phạm, It's CHARLES., Hồ Đông Quan, BeepBeepChild)	Huỳnh Lập	2840	+60	5430	180	Advanced
3	Bềnh bồng [Floating]	X-Song: "Nhỏ xíu nhỏ xiu" [Teeny-tiny Teeny-tiny] (Thơm (Da LAB), Jun Phạm, It's CHARLES., Hồ Đông Quan, BeepBeepChild)	It's CHARLES.	2840	+60	5430	280	Advanced
3	Bềnh bồng [Floating]	X-Song: "Nhỏ xíu nhỏ xiu" [Teeny-tiny Teeny-tiny] (Thơm (Da LAB), Jun Phạm, It's CHARLES., Hồ Đông Quan, BeepBeepChild)	Hồ Đông Quan	2840	+60	5430	230	Advanced
Episode 9 – Third performance round – Part 2 (29 tháng 8 năm 2026)
4	Hợp lực [Unite strengths]	X-Song: "Những năm tháng ấy" [Those days and years] (Thái VG, Trịnh Thăng Bình, Đinh Mạnh Ninh, Long Nón Lá, DJ Gokoo, Touliver, Monotape, Trần Thiện Thanh (Note: Song uses sample from "Gặp nhau làm ngơ".))	Nguyễn Văn Chung	2000	–30	4550	170	Eliminated
4	Hợp lực [Unite strengths]	X-Song: "Những năm tháng ấy" [Those days and years] (Thái VG, Trịnh Thăng Bình, Đinh Mạnh Ninh, Long Nón Lá, DJ Gokoo, Touliver, Monotape, Trần Thiện Thanh)	Thái VG	2000	–30	4550	260	Advanced
4	Hợp lực [Unite strengths]	X-Song: "Những năm tháng ấy" [Those days and years] (Thái VG, Trịnh Thăng Bình, Đinh Mạnh Ninh, Long Nón Lá, DJ Gokoo, Touliver, Monotape, Trần Thiện Thanh)	Tùng Mint	2000	–30	4550	200	Advanced
4	Hợp lực [Unite strengths]	X-Song: "Những năm tháng ấy" [Those days and years] (Thái VG, Trịnh Thăng Bình, Đinh Mạnh Ninh, Long Nón Lá, DJ Gokoo, Touliver, Monotape, Trần Thiện Thanh)	Trịnh Thăng Bình	2000	–30	4550	320	Advanced
4	Hợp lực [Unite strengths]	X-Song: "Những năm tháng ấy" [Those days and years] (Thái VG, Trịnh Thăng Bình, Đinh Mạnh Ninh, Long Nón Lá, DJ Gokoo, Touliver, Monotape, Trần Thiện Thanh)	Đinh Mạnh Ninh	2000	–30	4550	320	Advanced
5	Rực rỡ [Brilliant]	X-Song: "Chiến" [Fight] (Thanh Duy, Thỏ (Da LAB), Will, Hoàng Rob, Hoàng Dũng (Kevin), Hà Trà Đá, Lý Anh Khoa (Tổng Đài), Touliver)	Thanh Duy	2710	+40	5280	450	Advanced
5	Rực rỡ [Brilliant]	X-Song: "Chiến" [Fight] (Thanh Duy, Thỏ (Da LAB), Will, Hoàng Rob, Hoàng Dũng (Kevin), Hà Trà Đá, Lý Anh Khoa (Tổng Đài), Touliver)	Thỏ (Da LAB)	2710	+40	5280	290	Advanced
5	Rực rỡ [Brilliant]	X-Song: "Chiến" [Fight] (Thanh Duy, Thỏ (Da LAB), Will, Hoàng Rob, Hoàng Dũng (Kevin), Hà Trà Đá, Lý Anh Khoa (Tổng Đài), Touliver)	Will	2710	+40	5280	400	Advanced
5	Rực rỡ [Brilliant]	X-Song: "Chiến" [Fight] (Thanh Duy, Thỏ (Da LAB), Will, Hoàng Rob, Hoàng Dũng (Kevin), Hà Trà Đá, Lý Anh Khoa (Tổng Đài), Touliver)	Hoàng Rob	2710	+40	5280	200	Advanced
5	Rực rỡ [Brilliant]	X-Song: "Chiến" [Fight] (Thanh Duy, Thỏ (Da LAB), Will, Hoàng Rob, Hoàng Dũng (Kevin), Hà Trà Đá, Lý Anh Khoa (Tổng Đài), Touliver)	Hoàng Dũng	2710	+40	5280	270	Advanced
6	Mỹ mãn [Satisfying]	X-Song: "Khắp chốn thiên hà" [Everywhere across the universe] (OSAD, Hà An Huy, AnNgo (Fillinus))	Đại Nghĩa	2310	–30	4860	150	Eliminated
6	Mỹ mãn [Satisfying]	X-Song: "Khắp chốn thiên hà" [Everywhere across the universe] (OSAD, Hà An Huy, AnNgo (Fillinus))	Thuận Nguyễn	2310	–30	4860	270	Advanced
6	Mỹ mãn [Satisfying]	X-Song: "Khắp chốn thiên hà" [Everywhere across the universe] (OSAD, Hà An Huy, AnNgo (Fillinus))	Đông Hùng	2310	–30	4860	280	Advanced
6	Mỹ mãn [Satisfying]	X-Song: "Khắp chốn thiên hà" [Everywhere across the universe] (OSAD, Hà An Huy, AnNgo (Fillinus))	OSAD	2310	–30	4860	320	Advanced
6	Mỹ mãn [Satisfying]	X-Song: "Khắp chốn thiên hà" [Everywhere across the universe] (OSAD, Hà An Huy, AnNgo (Fillinus))	Hà An Huy	2310	–30	4860	360	Advanced
Alliance Match
Order	Performing songs (Songwriter/Composer)		Members	Second points			Match results	
1	"Buồn thì cứ khóc đi" [Cry if you're sad] (Lynk Lee, TDK, It's CHARLES.)		Will	2530			Lost	
1	"Buồn thì cứ khóc đi" [Cry if you're sad] (Lynk Lee, TDK, It's CHARLES.)		It's CHARLES.	2530			Lost	
1	"Buồn thì cứ khóc đi" [Cry if you're sad] (Lynk Lee, TDK, It's CHARLES.)		K.O	2530			Lost	
2	"Xuân thì" [Spring time] (Phan Mạnh Quỳnh, Hoàng Tôn)		Tùng Mint	2580			Won	
2	"Xuân thì" [Spring time] (Phan Mạnh Quỳnh, Hoàng Tôn)		Hoàng Tôn	2580			Won	
2	"Xuân thì" [Spring time] (Phan Mạnh Quỳnh, Hoàng Tôn)		Đông Hùng	2580			Won	

- House leaders.
- MVPs.

=== Fourth performance round: Stand tall and proud ===
In the fourth performance round, the talents formed alliances based on the overall performance firepower point rankings from the third performance round. Accordingly, the six houses were divided into two pools: "Trạng nguyên" (featuring the 1st to 3rd-ranked houses) and "Thám hoa" (featuring the 4th to 6th-ranked houses). The houses had 15 minutes to discuss, negotiate, and persuade each other to reach a decision on merging. Each alliance had to consist of one house from the Trạng nguyên pool and one from the Thám hoa pool, forming three main alliances in total. By the end of the process, the three merged alliances were "Nguyên tố mỹ mãn", "Quý tử bềnh bồng", and "Hợp lực rực rỡ".

To determine the song selection order, the alliances engaged in a tactical battle by bidding their personal firepower points for the right to enter the "card comparison" room against three defending talents: Tăng Phúc, Liên Bỉnh Phát, and Bùi Công Nam. The alliance submitting the highest bid received a set of numbered cards. In each round, the alliance representative and the defender drew 5 random cards to compare across three categories: total score lower than 21, total score higher than 21, and total score closest to 21. Whichever side won two out of three categories secured victory; in the event of a tie, one remaining secret card was used to decide the winner. The winning alliance earned the song selection order for that turn, and their firepower points were deducted only upon a successful bid and card comparison. After completing the card rounds, the alliances chose their songs and the themes for their original songs (X-Songs) in the order earned. Based on the remaining firepower points, the alliance with the highest points won the right to arrange the performance order for the vocal round, while the runner-up earned the right to arrange the performance order for the X-Song round.

During the Performance 4 show, all alliances competed in two rounds:

- Vocal Round: The first alliance performed, followed by a live audience vote. The second alliance then compared scores with the first, and the final alliance compared scores with the leading team. The alliance with the highest total score in this round claimed victory.
- Original Song Round (X-Song): Alliances performed in sequence based on their chosen ethnic cultural themes: Nguyên tố mỹ mãn chose Lạc Long Quân – Âu Cơ, Quý tử bềnh bồng selected Thánh Gióng, and Hợp lực rực rỡ opted for Thạch Sanh. The audience voted immediately following each performance.

Additionally, Performance 4 featured a "Warrior Stage" performance. Talents were free to register as warriors, undergo training, and participate in an individual video audition for the professional panel to select three official talents. After performing the warrior stage act, the audience voted for their favorite talent. The winning talent became the warrior of the performance round, receiving 100 firepower points and the privilege to save one teammate within their alliance who faced elimination. If two talents in a vulnerable alliance were at risk, only the one with the higher individual firepower score could be protected. At the end of the night, audience members cast individual popularity votes for up to three talents.

Based on the total votes of the performance round, the alliance with the highest overall score secured safety and preserved its entire roster, while the remaining two alliances fell into danger and faced member eliminations. At the conclusion of Performance 4, Quý tử bềnh bồng emerged as the safe alliance, while Tùng Mint and Toki Thành Thỏ were the two talents eliminated from the show.

Episode 10 – Fourth performance round – Part 1 (September 5th 2026)
Vocal battles
Order	Alliance	Performing songs (Songwriter/Composer)	Members	First points		Personal "firepower" points (Note: With brothers who performed many songs, their "firepower" points will only be shown once at their final performance..)	Result
1	Hợp lực rực rỡ	"Đi tìm lời ru nữ thần Mặt Trời" [] [Y Phôn Ksor)	Thái VG	2580		170	Advanced
1	Hợp lực rực rỡ	"Đi tìm lời ru nữ thần Mặt Trời" [] [Y Phôn Ksor)	Thanh Duy	2580		320	Advanced
1	Hợp lực rực rỡ	"Đi tìm lời ru nữ thần Mặt Trời" [] [Y Phôn Ksor)	Trịnh Thăng Bình	2580		510	Advanced
1	Hợp lực rực rỡ	"Đi tìm lời ru nữ thần Mặt Trời" [] [Y Phôn Ksor)	Đinh Mạnh Ninh	2580		550	Advanced
1	Hợp lực rực rỡ	"Đi tìm lời ru nữ thần Mặt Trời" [] [Y Phôn Ksor)	Hoàng Rob	2580		—N/a	Advanced
2	Quý tử bềnh bồng	"Vùng xám" [Grey zone] (J4RDIN, Harosé, Dlight, DuongK, Katzilla, It's CHARLES.)	Hoàng Tôn	2660		—N/a	Advanced
2	Quý tử bềnh bồng	"Vùng xám" [Grey zone] (J4RDIN, Harosé, Dlight, DuongK, Katzilla, It's CHARLES.)	Thơm (Da LAB)	2660		—N/a	Advanced
2	Quý tử bềnh bồng	"Vùng xám" [Grey zone] (J4RDIN, Harosé, Dlight, DuongK, Katzilla, It's CHARLES.)	It's CHARLES.	2660		—N/a	Advanced
2	Quý tử bềnh bồng	"Vùng xám" [Grey zone] (J4RDIN, Harosé, Dlight, DuongK, Katzilla, It's CHARLES.)	Hồ Đông Quan	2660		—N/a	Advanced
2	Quý tử bềnh bồng	"Vùng xám" [Grey zone] (J4RDIN, Harosé, Dlight, DuongK, Katzilla, It's CHARLES.)	Thái Lê Minh Hiếu	2660		—N/a	Advanced
3	Nguyên tố mỹ mãn	"Giọt buồn để lại" (Dương Khắc Linh, Hakoota Dũng Hà)	Thuận Nguyễn	2440		—N/a	Advanced
3	Nguyên tố mỹ mãn	"Giọt buồn để lại" (Dương Khắc Linh, Hakoota Dũng Hà)	Đông Hùng	2440		—N/a	Advanced
3	Nguyên tố mỹ mãn	"Giọt buồn để lại" (Dương Khắc Linh, Hakoota Dũng Hà)	Toki Thành Thỏ	2440		—N/a	Eliminated
3	Nguyên tố mỹ mãn	"Giọt buồn để lại" (Dương Khắc Linh, Hakoota Dũng Hà)	Cheng	2440		—N/a	Advanced
3	Nguyên tố mỹ mãn	"Giọt buồn để lại" (Dương Khắc Linh, Hakoota Dũng Hà)	Hà An Huy	2440		—N/a	Advanced
Episode 11 – Fourth performance round – Part 2 (September 12th 2026)
X-song battles
Order	Alliance	Performining songs (Songwriter/Composer)	Members	Second points	Total points	Personal "firepower" points	Results
1	Hợp lực rực rỡ	X-Song: "Tích tịch tình tang" (Will, Hoàng Dũng, GRVITY) (Note: Song uses samples from "Khúc hát then Thần Sa" by Duy Quang and "Đường về bản em" by Đàm Thanh. Performance also had supporting acts from Suối Ngàn then choir and Duy Quang.)	Tùng Mint	2590	5170	130	Eliminated
1	Hợp lực rực rỡ	X-Song: "Tích tịch tình tang" (Will, Hoàng Dũng, GRVITY)	Thỏ (Da LAB)	2590	5170	490	Advanced
1	Hợp lực rực rỡ	X-Song: "Tích tịch tình tang" (Will, Hoàng Dũng, GRVITY)	Will	2590	5170	370	Advanced
1	Hợp lực rực rỡ	X-Song: "Tích tịch tình tang" (Will, Hoàng Dũng, GRVITY)	Hoàng Rob	2590	5170	300	Advanced
1	Hợp lực rực rỡ	X-Song: "Tích tịch tình tang" (Will, Hoàng Dũng, GRVITY)	Hoàng Dũng	2590	5170	230	Advanced
2	Nguyên tố mỹ mãn	X-Song: "Tiếng ru cội nguồn" (Cheng, OSAD, Hà An Huy, Javix)	Thuận Nguyễn	2720	5160	430	Advanced
2	Nguyên tố mỹ mãn	X-Song: "Tiếng ru cội nguồn" (Cheng, OSAD, Hà An Huy, Javix)	Đông Hùng	2720	5160	270	Advanced
2	Nguyên tố mỹ mãn	X-Song: "Tiếng ru cội nguồn" (Cheng, OSAD, Hà An Huy, Javix)	Toki Thành Thỏ	2720	5160	200	Eliminated
2	Nguyên tố mỹ mãn	X-Song: "Tiếng ru cội nguồn" (Cheng, OSAD, Hà An Huy, Javix)	Duy Khánh	2720	5160	560	Advanced
2	Nguyên tố mỹ mãn	X-Song: "Tiếng ru cội nguồn" (Cheng, OSAD, Hà An Huy, Javix)	Cheng	2720	5160	380	Advanced
2	Nguyên tố mỹ mãn	X-Song: "Tiếng ru cội nguồn" (Cheng, OSAD, Hà An Huy, Javix)	K.O	2720	5160	430	Advanced
2	Nguyên tố mỹ mãn	X-Song: "Tiếng ru cội nguồn" (Cheng, OSAD, Hà An Huy, Javix)	OSAD	2720	5160	770	Advanced
2	Nguyên tố mỹ mãn	X-Song: "Tiếng ru cội nguồn" (Cheng, OSAD, Hà An Huy, Javix)	Hà An Huy	2720	5160	240	Advanced
3	Quý tử bềnh bồng	X-Song: "Trên đất mình" [In Our Land] (Jun Phạm, Mew Amazing, Monotape, Hà Trà Đá) (Note: Song uses sample from "Lý đất giống", a Southern Vietnamese folk song and Hoài Cầu tune, a tune with origins from Hồ Quảng music.)	Hoàng Tôn	2860	5520	250	Advanced
3	Quý tử bềnh bồng	X-Song: "Trên đất mình" [In Our Land] (Jun Phạm, Mew Amazing, Monotape, Hà Trà Đá)	Thơm (Da LAB)	2860	5520	390	Advanced
3	Quý tử bềnh bồng	X-Song: "Trên đất mình" [In Our Land] (Jun Phạm, Mew Amazing, Monotape, Hà Trà Đá)	Jun Phạm	2860	5520	800	Advanced
3	Quý tử bềnh bồng	X-Song: "Trên đất mình" [In Our Land] (Jun Phạm, Mew Amazing, Monotape, Hà Trà Đá)	Mew Amazing	2860	5520	560	Advanced
3	Quý tử bềnh bồng	X-Song: "Trên đất mình" [In Our Land] (Jun Phạm, Mew Amazing, Monotape, Hà Trà Đá)	BB Trần	2860	5520	460	Advanced
3	Quý tử bềnh bồng	X-Song: "Trên đất mình" [In Our Land] (Jun Phạm, Mew Amazing, Monotape, Hà Trà Đá)	Huỳnh Lập	2860	5520	170	Advanced
3	Quý tử bềnh bồng	X-Song: "Trên đất mình" [In Our Land] (Jun Phạm, Mew Amazing, Monotape, Hà Trà Đá)	It's CHARLES.	2860	5520	270	Advanced
3	Quý tử bềnh bồng	X-Song: "Trên đất mình" [In Our Land] (Jun Phạm, Mew Amazing, Monotape, Hà Trà Đá)	Hồ Đông Quan	2860	5520	410	Advanced
3	Quý tử bềnh bồng	X-Song: "Trên đất mình" [In Our Land] (Jun Phạm, Mew Amazing, Monotape, Hà Trà Đá)	Thái Lê Minh Hiếu	2860	5520	340	Advanced
Warrior stage
Performing songs (Songwriter/Composer)			Members	Points			Results
"Đại khải hoàn" [The Great Triumph] (The Flob, Will, OSAD, Tiêu Minh Phụng)			Hoàng Tôn	830			Lost
"Đại khải hoàn" [The Great Triumph] (The Flob, Will, OSAD, Tiêu Minh Phụng)			Will	1120			Lost
"Đại khải hoàn" [The Great Triumph] (The Flob, Will, OSAD, Tiêu Minh Phụng)			OSAD	1330			Won

- Brothers who are house leaders.
- Round's MVPs.
- Warrior brothers.

=== Fifth performance round: Flicker flicker ===
At the fifth performance round, the merger and transfer format was applied to form the Talents' final Houses. The process of establishing new Houses took place across two rounds according to the following rules:

- In the first round, six Houses from the previous performance rounds were separated into individual rooms, where the bottom two Houses in Firepower points were officially dissolved. These two Houses had ten minutes to discuss and designate two members to be transferred to other Houses, with the fifth-placed House given priority for the transfer process. After the discussion period, the designated members moved to the common lounge to wait. For the remaining four Houses, each sent a representative to the common lounge within fifteen minutes to recruit their desired members. If a mutual agreement was reached, the Talents signed a merger commitment. If recruitment failed, the transferred members returned to their rooms to await their turn in the next round.
- In the following round, the process proceeded similarly with all transferred members who had not found a House in the previous round, with the condition that transferred members were required to select a House to join. A total of four Houses debuted after this process.

The fifth performance round featured a total of eight songs, competed in a paired head-to-head format. The Houses went through two rounds of song selection as follows:

- In the first round, the four Houses received their Firepower points, then returned to their private rooms to listen to the song demos of the eight tracks. Based on their points, each House divided and distributed their score evenly across seven cards, then brought any five cards to match against their opponent's. The House that won three out of five cards earned the right to select their desired song while surrendering all Firepower points placed on the matching table; the losing House lost one random Firepower card placed on the table and continued to the next matchup until successfully securing a song.
- In the second round, based on the remaining points after the previous round's card matching, each House divided and distributed their points evenly across five cards, then brought any three cards to match against their opponent's. The House that won two out of three cards earned the same right, while the losing House lost one random Firepower card on the table and proceeded to the next matchup until successfully securing a song. Based on the remaining Firepower points after two rounds of card matching, the top-ranked House won the right to arrange the matchups, and the second-ranked House won the right to set the performance order.

On Performance Night 5, all Houses had to participate in two rounds: the "Ignition Round" and the "Finalizing Round." Before starting, each House received 50 Firepower points from the show to allocate across their performances. Houses competed head-to-head in each round, with the audience voting immediately after each performance for a direct score comparison. The winning House in each round collected all points invested in that performance, including both their own and their opponent's. At the end of the night, audience members voted for up to three Talents through personal popularity votes.

Based on the combined score of the performances and the total Firepower points won after two head-to-head rounds, the top two Houses advanced with their full lineups intact, while the remaining two Houses entered the danger zone, facing potential member eliminations. At the conclusion of Performance Round 5, House Hào Môn and House Lẫy Lừng emerged safe, while Will and Thuận Nguyễn were the two individuals eliminated from the competition.

Episode 12 – Fifth performance round – Part 1 (September 19th 2026)
Ignition round
Order	Houses	Performing songs (Songwriter/Composer)	Members	Round 1 points		Betting points	Round results (Note: The result of each round is recorded simply as a win or a loss, while the individual outcome for each Talent is recorded as advanced or eliminated.)		
1	Lục lạc [Rattles]	"Chuyện chàng cô đơn" [Tale of a lonely boy] (Hoàng Bách, Thanh Duy, Cheng, K.O)	Thanh Duy	2450		50 (35)	Won		
1	Lục lạc [Rattles]	"Chuyện chàng cô đơn" [Tale of a lonely boy] (Hoàng Bách, Thanh Duy, Cheng, K.O)	Thỏ (Da LAB)	2450		50 (35)	Won		
1	Lục lạc [Rattles]	"Chuyện chàng cô đơn" [Tale of a lonely boy] (Hoàng Bách, Thanh Duy, Cheng, K.O)	Will	2450		50 (35)	Won		
1	Lục lạc [Rattles]	"Chuyện chàng cô đơn" [Tale of a lonely boy] (Hoàng Bách, Thanh Duy, Cheng, K.O)	Duy Khánh	2450		50 (35)	Won		
1	Lục lạc [Rattles]	"Chuyện chàng cô đơn" [Tale of a lonely boy] (Hoàng Bách, Thanh Duy, Cheng, K.O)	Cheng	2450		50 (35)	Won		
1	Lục lạc [Rattles]	"Chuyện chàng cô đơn" [Tale of a lonely boy] (Hoàng Bách, Thanh Duy, Cheng, K.O)	K.O	2450		50 (35)	Won		
2	Hào môn [wealthy family]	"Lỗi tại mưa" (Vicky Nhung, Hoàng Tôn, Mew Amazing)	Trịnh Thăng Bình	2280		0 (15)	Danger		
2	Hào môn [wealthy family]	"Lỗi tại mưa" (Vicky Nhung, Hoàng Tôn, Mew Amazing)	Hoàng Tôn	2280		0 (15)	Danger		
2	Hào môn [wealthy family]	"Lỗi tại mưa" (Vicky Nhung, Hoàng Tôn, Mew Amazing)	Đinh Mạnh Ninh	2280		0 (15)	Danger		
2	Hào môn [wealthy family]	"Lỗi tại mưa" (Vicky Nhung, Hoàng Tôn, Mew Amazing)	Mew Amazing	2280		0 (15)	Danger		
2	Hào môn [wealthy family]	"Lỗi tại mưa" (Vicky Nhung, Hoàng Tôn, Mew Amazing)	BB Trần	2280		0 (15)	Danger		
2	Hào môn [wealthy family]	"Lỗi tại mưa" (Vicky Nhung, Hoàng Tôn, Mew Amazing)	Thái Lê Minh Hiếu	2280		0 (15)	Danger		
3	Thăng hoa (Note: The remaining members of the Thăng Hoa House appeared as supporting performers for the act "Cảm ơn tình yêu tôi.")[Sublimation]	"Cảm ơn tình yêu tôi" [Thank you my love] (Phương Uyên, Hoàng Dũng, Hà An Huy)	Hoàng Dũng	2040		0 (28)	Danger		
3	Thăng hoa[Sublimation]	"Cảm ơn tình yêu tôi" [Thank you my love] (Phương Uyên, Hoàng Dũng, Hà An Huy)	Hà An Huy	2040		0 (28)	Danger		
4	Lẫy lừng	"Xinh" [Pretty] (Nathan Lee, Thái VG, It's CHARLES., Long Nón Lá)	Thái VG	2680		40 (12)	Won		
4	Lẫy lừng	"Xinh" [Pretty] (Nathan Lee, Thái VG, It's CHARLES., Long Nón Lá)	Thơm (Da LAB)	2680		40 (12)	Won		
4	Lẫy lừng	"Xinh" [Pretty] (Nathan Lee, Thái VG, It's CHARLES., Long Nón Lá)	Jun Phạm	2680		40 (12)	Won		
4	Lẫy lừng	"Xinh" [Pretty] (Nathan Lee, Thái VG, It's CHARLES., Long Nón Lá)	Huỳnh Lập	2680		40 (12)	Won		
4	Lẫy lừng	"Xinh" [Pretty] (Nathan Lee, Thái VG, It's CHARLES., Long Nón Lá)	It's CHARLES.	2680		40 (12)	Won		
4	Lẫy lừng	"Xinh" [Pretty] (Nathan Lee, Thái VG, It's CHARLES., Long Nón Lá)	Hồ Đông Quan	2680		40 (12)	Won		
Episode 13 – Fifth performance round – Part 2 (September 26th 2026)
Finalizing round
Order	Houses	Performing songs (Songwriter/Composer)	Members	Round 2 points	Betting points	Total points	Personal "firepower" points	Round results	Final results
1	Hào môn	"Tìm lại" Microwave, Trịnh Thăng Bình, Hoàng Tôn, Đinh Mạnh Ninh)	Trịnh Thăng Bình	2530	50 (35)	4860	490	Won	Advanced
1	Hào môn	"Tìm lại" Microwave, Trịnh Thăng Bình, Hoàng Tôn, Đinh Mạnh Ninh)	Hoàng Tôn	2530	50 (35)	4860	620	Won	Advanced
1	Hào môn	"Tìm lại" Microwave, Trịnh Thăng Bình, Hoàng Tôn, Đinh Mạnh Ninh)	Đinh Mạnh Ninh	2530	50 (35)	4860	520	Won	Advanced
1	Hào môn	"Tìm lại" Microwave, Trịnh Thăng Bình, Hoàng Tôn, Đinh Mạnh Ninh)	Mew Amazing	2530	50 (35)	4860	250	Won	Advanced
1	Hào môn	"Tìm lại" Microwave, Trịnh Thăng Bình, Hoàng Tôn, Đinh Mạnh Ninh)	BB Trần	2530	50 (35)	4860	320	Won	Advanced
1	Hào môn	"Tìm lại" Microwave, Trịnh Thăng Bình, Hoàng Tôn, Đinh Mạnh Ninh)	Thái Lê Minh Hiếu	2530	50 (35)	4860	320	Won	Advanced
2	Lục lạc	"Có khi" (Hoài Lâm, Thanh Duy, Will, K.O)	Thanh Duy	2210	0 (15)	4710	300	Lost	Advanced
2	Lục lạc	"Có khi" (Hoài Lâm, Thanh Duy, Will, K.O)	Thỏ (Da LAB)	2210	0 (15)	4710	800	Lost	Advanced
2	Lục lạc	"Có khi" (Hoài Lâm, Thanh Duy, Will, K.O)	Will	2210	0 (15)	4710	230	Lost	Eliminated
2	Lục lạc	"Có khi" (Hoài Lâm, Thanh Duy, Will, K.O)	Duy Khánh	2210	0 (15)	4710	400	Lost	Advanced
2	Lục lạc	"Có khi" (Hoài Lâm, Thanh Duy, Will, K.O)	Cheng	2210	0 (15)	4710	300	Lost	Advanced
2	Lục lạc	"Có khi" (Hoài Lâm, Thanh Duy, Will, K.O)	K.O	2210	0 (15)	4710	360	Lost	Advanced
3	Lẫy lừng	X-Song: "Như ngày đầu" [Like the first day] (Thái VG, Thơm (Da LAB), It's CHARLES., Long Nón Lá, BeepBeepChild)	Thái VG	2680	60 (38)	5460	250	Won	Advanced
3	Lẫy lừng	X-Song: "Như ngày đầu" [Like the first day] (Thái VG, Thơm (Da LAB), It's CHARLES., Long Nón Lá, BeepBeepChild)	Thơm (Da LAB)	2680	60 (38)	5460	450	Won	Advanced
3	Lẫy lừng	X-Song: "Như ngày đầu" [Like the first day] (Thái VG, Thơm (Da LAB), It's CHARLES., Long Nón Lá, BeepBeepChild)	Jun Phạm	2680	60 (38)	5460	630	Won	Advanced
3	Lẫy lừng	X-Song: "Như ngày đầu" [Like the first day] (Thái VG, Thơm (Da LAB), It's CHARLES., Long Nón Lá, BeepBeepChild)	Huỳnh Lập	2680	60 (38)	5460	250	Won	Advanced
3	Lẫy lừng	X-Song: "Như ngày đầu" [Like the first day] (Thái VG, Thơm (Da LAB), It's CHARLES., Long Nón Lá, BeepBeepChild)	It's CHARLES.	2680	60 (38)	5460	250	Won	Advanced
3	Lẫy lừng	X-Song: "Như ngày đầu" [Like the first day] (Thái VG, Thơm (Da LAB), It's CHARLES., Long Nón Lá, BeepBeepChild)	Hồ Đông Quan	2680	60 (38)	5460	540	Won	Advanced
4	Thăng hoa	"Và tôi cũng yêu em" [And I love you too] (Đức Huy, OSAD)	Hoàng Rob	2410	0 (22)	4450	280	Lost	Advanced
4	Thăng hoa	"Và tôi cũng yêu em" [And I love you too] (Đức Huy, OSAD)	Thuận Nguyễn	2410	0 (22)	4450	270	Lost	Eliminated
4	Thăng hoa	"Và tôi cũng yêu em" [And I love you too] (Đức Huy, OSAD)	Đông Hùng	2410	0 (22)	4450	290	Lost	Advanced
4	Thăng hoa	"Và tôi cũng yêu em" [And I love you too] (Đức Huy, OSAD)	Hoàng Dũng	2410	0 (22)	4450	280	Lost	Advanced
4	Thăng hoa	"Và tôi cũng yêu em" [And I love you too] (Đức Huy, OSAD)	OSAD	2410	0 (22)	4450	380	Lost	Advanced
4	Thăng hoa	"Và tôi cũng yêu em" [And I love you too] (Đức Huy, OSAD)	Hà An Huy	2410	0 (22)	4450	340	Lost	Advanced

- Brothers who are house leaders
- MVPs

== Elimination chart and "firepower" points ==
Elimination chart
Round	Reunion round (Episode 1–2)		Round 1 (Episode 3-4)		Round 2 (Episode 5-7)		Round 3		Round 4		Round 5		Finale	
Round	Performances' points	Personal "firepower" points	Performances' points	Personal "firepower" points	Performances' points	Personal "firepower" points	Performances' points	Personal "firepower" points	Performances' points	Personal "firepower" points	Performances' points	Personal "firepower" points	Finale points	Personal "firepower" points
"Talented" brothers	Result													
Mew Amazing	Win (1650)	340	Advanced (2150)	360	Advanced (3940)	290	Advanced (4500)	330	Advanced (5520)		Advanced (4280)			
Huỳnh Lập	Win (1650)	350	Advanced ()	210	Advanced (2880)	150	Advanced (5430)	180	Advanced (5520)		Advanced (4280)			
Hồ Đông Quan	Lost (1350)	210	Advanced ()	250	Advanced (2620)	310	Advanced (5430)	230	Advanced (5520)		Advanced (4280)			
K.O	Lost (1350)	110	Advanced ()	180	Advanced (2620)	369	Advanced (4800)	410	Advanced (5160)					
Thỏ (Da LAB)	Lost (1450)	270	Advanced ()	170	Advanced (2620)	100	Advanced (5280)	290	Advanced (5170)					
Hà An Huy	Lost (1450)	320	Advanced ()	290	Advanced (4210)	650	Advanced (4860)	360	Advanced (5160)					
Trịnh Thăng Bình	Lost (1450)	150	Advanced ()	180	Advanced (4210)	330	Advanced (4550)	320	Advanced (5170)		Advanced (4280)			
Đinh Mạnh Ninh	Win (1510)	290	Advanced ()	150	Advanced (2880)	469	Advanced (4550)	320	Advanced (5170)		Advanced (4280)			
Thơm (Da LAB)	Win (1510)	280	Advanced ()	370	Advanced (2620)	320	Advanced (5430)	410	Advanced (5520)		Advanced (4280)			
Đông Hùng	Win (1680)	260	Advanced ()	220	Advanced (3940)	200	Advanced (4860)	280	Advanced (5160)					
Hoàng Rob	Win (1680)	140	Advanced ()	160	Advanced (3940)	270	Advanced (5280)	200	Advanced (5170)					
OSAD	Win (1500)	120	Advanced ()	180	Advanced (2620)	290	Advanced (4860)	320	Advanced (5160)					
Thái Lê Minh Hiếu	Win (1500)	340	Advanced ()	310	Advanced (2880)	390	Advanced (4500)	400	Advanced (5520)		Advanced (4280)			
Hoàng Tôn	Win (1500)	350	Advanced ()	200	Advanced (3940)	150	Advanced (4500)	390	Advanced (5520)		Advanced (4280)			
Cheng	Lost (1480)	270	Advanced ()	260	Advanced (2880)	300	Advanced (4800)	300	Advanced (5160)					
It's CHARLES.	Lost (1480)	150	Advanced ()	200	Advanced (3940)	170	Advanced (5430)	280	Advanced (5520)		Advanced (4280)			
Thái VG	Lost (1480)	350	Advanced ()	320	Advanced (3940)	200	Advanced (4550)	260	Advanced (5170)		Advanced (4280)			
BB Trần	Win (1660)	490	Advanced (2110)	300	Advanced (4210)	590	Advanced (4500)	400	Advanced (5520)		Advanced (4280)			
Thanh Duy	Win (1660)	390	Advanced (2150)	400	Advanced (4210)	600	Advanced (5280)	450	Advanced (5170)					
Duy Khánh	Win (1660)	460	Advanced (2110)	350	Advanced (2880)	640	Advanced (4800)	510	Advanced (5160)					
Jun Phạm	Win (1660)	480	Advanced (2150)	550	Advanced (3940)	840	Advanced (5430)	680	Advanced (5520)	800	Advanced (5460)	630		
Hoàng Dũng	Lost (1340)	420	Advanced ()	350	Advanced (3940)	370	Advanced (5280)	270	Advanced (5170)	230	Advanced (4450)	280		
Thuận Nguyễn	Lost (1300)	290	Advanced (2110)	170	Advanced (4210)	200	Advanced (4860)	270	Advanced (5160)	430	Eliminated (4450)	270		
Will	Lost (1350)	120	Advanced ()	260	Advanced (2880)	610	Advanced (4280)	400	Advanced (5170)	370	Eliminated (4710)	230		
Tùng Mint	Lost (1300)	190	Advanced ()	120	Advanced (3940)	40	Advanced (4550)	200	Eliminated (5170)					
Toki Thành Thỏ	Lost (1350)	330	Advanced (2110)	220	Advanced (2880)	160	Advanced (4800)	280	Eliminated (5160)					
Phùng Minh Cương	Win (1680)	230	Advanced ()	190	Advanced (4210)	90	Eliminated (4800)	160						
Neko Lê	Win (1660)	250	Advanced ()	210	Advanced (2880)	620	Eliminated (4500)	380						
Đại Nghĩa	Win (1650)	180	Advanced ()	160	Advanced (4210)	120	Eliminated (4860)	150						
Nguyễn Văn Chung	Lost (1340)	170	Advanced ()	130	Advanced (4210)	170	Eliminated (4550)	170						
Lê Xuân Tiền	Lost (1300)	280	Advanced (2110)	270	Eliminated (2620)	90								
Vương Anh Tú	Lost (1340)	120	Eliminated ()	80										
14 Casper	Lost (1340)	110	Eliminated ()	110										
Dũng DT	WIN (1510)	130	QUIT											

- "Talented" brothers in the safe/win zone of any round.
- "Talented" brothers named MVP of the rounds.
- "Talented" brothers in the danger/lost zone of any round.
- "Talented" brothers in the danger zone and got eliminated.
- “Talented” brothers who quit the competition.
- "Talented" brothers not participating due to being eliminated.
