= Call Me by Fire Vietnam =

- Genre: Reality show; Music competition
- Based on: Call Me by Fire by Mango TV
- Directed by: Đinh Hà Uyên Thư
- Creative director: Vĩ Khang
- Presented by: Anh Tuấn; Khánh Vy (season 1); Trần Ngọc (season 2)
- Theme music composer: It's Charles
- Opening theme: Hoả ca (season 1); Hỏa tâm (season 2)
- Country of origin: Vietnam
- Original language: Vietnamese
- No. of seasons: 2
- No. of episodes: 30

Production
- Executive producers: Ngô Thị Vân Hạnh; Trần Hồng Hà
- Camera setup: Multiple camera setup
- Running time: 90 mins (TV tracks, including advertising); 120 – 180 mins (streamlined)
- Production companies: Arts Department, Vietnam Television; 1Production (YeaH1) LLC

Original release
- Network: VTV3
- Release: June 29, 2024 – October 10, 2026

Related
- Hot Bros "Say Hi"

Anh trai vượt ngàn chông gai (lit. 'Brothers overcoming thousands of obstacles') is a music reality show broadcast on VTV3 and produced by Yeah1. It is a Vietnamese adaptation of the Chinese show Call Me by Fire.

== Format ==
The show features male artists (referred to as "anh tài" (lit. 'Talented brothers')) who perform together in teams for different performance rounds, in order to compete for a spot in the "all-powerful family" (alternative form of a musical group), consisting of the final winners. Originally, the show only allowed for artists who are near the age of 30 or more, but recent changes have allowed for artists under 30 years old to compete. Additionally, following the original Call Me by Fire format, after each performance round, members of the losing team would have some of their members be eliminated.

All the "talented brothers" will split into teams to compete. They will undergo training to perform in official competition nights, to select the top "talented brothers" for the "all-powerful family." Throughout the competition, in addition to performing, there will be special rules: bidding for songs and performance order. The studio audiences would evaluate and vote for the "talented brothers" to determine the ranking of the performances as well as each person's "firepower points" after every show.

== Production ==
On January 25, 2024, the producers announced via the official fan page of Sisters Who Make Waves Vietnam that they would be producing and airing the adaptation of Call Me By Fire. The producers stated that the Vietnamese version will maintain the spirit and values of the original while making appropriate changes to meet the tastes and entertainment culture of the local audience. In response to opinions suggesting that Call Me By Fire is simply a male version of Sisters Who Make Waves, a representative for the producers denied this, stating that the criteria, rules, and methods for resolving conflicts in this show are completely different from the latter.

In early April 2024, the producers announced the key members of the production team for the show's first season. Accordingly, Đinh Hà Uyên Thư serves as the stage director, SlimV as the music director, Anh Tuấn and Khánh Vy as the show's hosts, Đặng Thiếu Ngân as the content consultant, and Trần Quốc Vương as the stage visual director. The identities of the participants for the first season were revealed throughout April and May 2024.

Starting June 23 (about a week before the official premiere), the show released its identity bumpers, teasers, the official MV teaser, and the official trailer. Before the air date, a representative for the producers further revealed that the contestants "don't just compete in singing but also in wits," demonstrated through the song auction rules. With this signature gameplay, the producers aim to portray men who, while friendly in real life, are highly strategic and resourceful when competing against one another. On June 28, the show's official theme song MV, titled "Hỏa ca" (Song of Fire), was released.

The official press conference took place on June 26 with the participation of almost all the "talented brothers" (except for artist Tự Long, who was absent due to his own schedule) along with several guest artists. During the press conference, the production representative stated that the show is not looking to form a group like in *Sisters Who Make Waves*, but rather to find an "all-around family," meaning the winners. The producers view this as a beautiful journey with a meaningful destination, and the participants are not required to perform together after the show ends. Additionally, addressing opinions that the votes from the 350 audience members do not represent the majority, the production representative confirmed there will be an independent auditing firm to oversee the results. The representative asserted that the on-site audience voting is only momentary and does not represent all viewers. Furthermore, the audience can also vote to choose the winners for seven sub-awards for the "talented brothers."

At the beginning of 2025, the producer announced that they would not be producing Season 2 of Call Me by Fire in 2025, along with Season 3 of Sisters Who Make Waves, giving up the airtime for the show Gia đình Haha. The program is expected to resume production for Season 2 in 2026.

The program is produced by the Arts Department of Vietnam Television in collaboration with 1Production (a subsidiary of YeaH1).

=== Filming ===
The program is filmed at 1Studio (located at 41–49 An Phu, An Phu Ward, Thu Duc, Ho Chi Minh City), which, according to the production unit Yeah1, will "produce high-quality content" for the producer in 2024. Filming had to be temporarily suspended at one point to dismantle unauthorized construction at the filming location. According to Tuoi Tre, the site was designated in the construction contract as a "residential building combined with offices," signed between Yeah1 and the Dandelion Advertising Joint Stock Company for a value of over 142 billion VND.

=== Theme song ===
Anh trai vượt ngàn chông gai season 1 theme song is "Hỏa ca", produced by SlimV and co-written with It's Charles, and performed by the 33 "talents" from the first season. The MV teaser was released on June 26 and the official MV was released two days later. SlimV stated that this song was created to convey the spirit of unity and create a bond among the artists participating in the show. The song combines the modernity of electronic music with rock music and symphonic music pieces. According to SlimV, the inspiring nature is the most attractive aspect of this theme song, and through it, he hopes the audience can feel the fiery spirit that the "talents" want to convey, which may include memories from each person's music career.

Anh trai vượt ngàn chông gai season 2 theme song is "Hỏa tâm", produced by SlimV and co-written with It's Charles, and performed by the 34 "talents" from the second season.

== Broadcast ==
Anh trai vượt ngàn chông gai season 1 broadcasts every Saturday from June 29, 2024, at 8:00 PM on VTV3 and premiered at 8:30 PM on the same day on the channel YouTube YeaH1 Show.

Anh trai vượt ngàn chông gai season 2 broadcasts every Saturday from June 27, 2026, at 8:00 PM on VTV3 and premiered at 8:30 PM on the same day on the channel YouTube YeaH1 Show.

== Season overview ==
Season overview
Season	No. of contestants	Episodes	Originally released	
Season	No. of contestants	Episodes	First released	Last released
1	33	15	June 29, 2024	October 19, 2024
2	34	15	June 27, 2026	October 10, 2026

== Reception ==
Right from the announcement of the contestants' identities, Brothers Overcoming Thousands of Thorns attracted audience attention by consistently ranking among the most discussed programs on social media, according to Kompa's statistics. With the program Brothers "Say Hi" – a program with the same theme, content, and motif – airing at the same time as this program, many viewers predict there will be a competition in terms of popularity and the ambitions of the producers, as well as an expectation that the programs will have their own special elements to attract audiences. However, according to Người Lao Động, the participation of many artists in the same show can become a disadvantage; the article cited the example of the show Sisters Who Make Waves by the same producer, Yeah1, where too many 'beautiful sisters' caused the audience's attention to be dispersed. Each artist has their own audience and fans, so arguments and accusations to protect idols constantly occur, thereby affecting the producers to some extent.

The MV for the show's theme song "Hỏa ca" (Fire Song) received much support and praise from the audience upon its release. A review by Znews stated that in addition to the captivating and attractive music and meaningful lyrics, the MV's content was also highly appreciated, and giving all the talented brothers equal vocal time was also a big plus.

When the first episode aired, the show received widespread audience support; most of the controversial issues in Sisters Who Make Waves were reportedly resolved in Brothers Overcoming Thousands of Obstacles. A review by Law Life stated that it had been a long time since the first seasons of The Voice of Vietnam, Vietnam Idol, or The Remix, that a television program broadcast on national television was as "attractive, impressive, and enjoyable for audiences of all ages" as this one. The review also mentioned that the discussions and comments from the audience about the talents, songs, etc., after each episode on social media were a sight that had not been seen again for a long time. Writing in the online newspaper Communist Party of Vietnam, Anh Tuan commented, "the program has attracted the attention of the audience because of the artistic and humanistic values that a national television channel needs to do in the 4.0 era, the digital age, and at the same time opens up opportunities for producers to aim for a further goal of jointly developing Vietnam's cultural industry." According to Tien Phong, through the program, artists past their peak regained their appeal, and a series of other artists had their appeal elevated. The program achieved the top 1 rating on VTV3 for most of its broadcast time, based on female audiences in four major cities according to Kantar Media data.

The program has also been recognized as a testament to the development of the cultural industry with attractive programs and great social effects. Prime Minister Pham Minh Chinh in his speech at a conference mentioned the success of two concerts Anh trai "say hi" and Anh trai vượt ngàn chông gai, and highly appreciated the creativity of young Vietnamese people participating: "Through these two concerts, we have seen that we are capable enough, intelligent enough, and creative enough to develop the cultural industry and entertainment industry. We have a culture rich in national identity, with internal strength, traditions, and potential to enhance cultural enjoyment..."

== Awards and nominations ==
Year	Award	Category	Nomination as	Result
2024	Vietnam iContent Awards	Inspiring TV show	Anh trai vượt ngàn chông gai	Won
2024	Vietnam iContent Awards	Digital Icon of the Year	Anh trai vượt ngàn chông gai	Nominated
2024	Ngôi sao của năm (Star of the year)	Entertainment Icon	Anh trai vượt ngàn chông gai	Nominated
2025	Ấn tượng VTV (VTV impressive awards)	Most impressive TV show	Anh trai vượt ngàn chông gai	Won
2025	Giải Mai Vàng (Golden shell award)	Best program on digital and TV	Anh trai vượt ngàn chông gai	Won
2025	Giải Mai Vàng (Golden shell award)	Best MC	Anh Tuấn	Won
2025	Giải Mai Vàng (Golden shell award)	Best song	"Mẹ yêu con" (composer: Nguyễn Văn Tý; performer: Tinh hoa house)	Nominated
2025	Giải Mai Vàng (Golden shell award)	Best song	"Trống cơm" (composer: Dân ca Bắc Bộ; performer: Sao sáng house)	Nominated
2025	Giải Mai Vàng (Golden shell award)	Best song	"Thuận nước đẩy thuyền" (composer: S.T Sơn Thạch, Thanh Hưng, Andiez, performer: S.T Sơn Thạch)	Won
2025	Giải Mai Vàng (Golden shell award)	Best comedian	Tự Long	Won
2025	WeChoice Awards	Entertainment show of the year	Anh trai vượt ngàn chông gai	Won
2025	WeChoice Awards	Artists with notable activities	Tự Long	Nominated
2025	WeChoice Awards	Artists with notable activities	SlimV	Nominated
2025	WeChoice Awards	Artists with notable activities	Đinh Hà Uyên Thư	Nominated
2025	WeChoice Awards	Artists with notable activities	Bùi Công Nam	Won
2025	WeChoice Awards	Singer/Rapper with breakthrough activities	Binz	Nominated
2025	WeChoice Awards	Singer/Rapper with breakthrough activities	SOOBIN	Won
2025	WeChoice Awards	Best performance	"Trống cơm" – Cường Seven, SOOBIN, Tự Long	Won
2025	WeChoice Awards	Producer of the year	Kriss Ngô	Won
2025	WeChoice Awards	Inspiring individuals	SOOBIN	Won
2025	WeChoice Awards	Inspiring individuals	Tự Long	Won
2025	WeChoice Awards	Inspiring ambassador	Tự Long	Won
2025	WeChoice Awards	Z-Slang – Slang of the year	"Đỉnh nóc, kịch trần, bay phấp phới" (translation: Over the roof, over the top, fluttering)	Won
2025	Làn Sóng Xanh (Green wave awards)	Male singer/rapper of the year	SOOBIN	Won
2025	Làn Sóng Xanh (Green wave awards)	Breakthrough singer	Quốc Thiên	Nominated
2025	Làn Sóng Xanh (Green wave awards)	Mix and master category	"Trống cơm" – Kriss Ngô & Touliver	Won
2025	Làn Sóng Xanh (Green wave awards)	Mix and master category	"Hỏa ca (Call Me by Fire)" – GRVITY, Touliver (55), SlimV, Duy Sơn, Hà Trà Đá, TINLE	Nominated
2025	Làn Sóng Xanh (Green wave awards)	Producer of the year	SlimV	Won
2025	Làn Sóng Xanh (Green wave awards)	Best collaboration	"Trống cơm" – Cường Seven, SOOBIN, Tự Long, APJ, It’s Charles., SlimV, Kriss Ngô & Touliver	Won
2025	Làn Sóng Xanh (Green wave awards)	Music video of the year	"Hỏa ca (Call Me by Fire)" – Đạo diễn: Đinh Hà Uyên Thư	Nominated
2025	Làn Sóng Xanh (Green wave awards)	Program of the year	Anh trai vượt ngàn chông gai	Won
2025	Giải Âm nhạc Cống hiến (Contributing music awards)	Program series of the year	Live Concert series Anh trai vượt ngàn chông gai	Won
2025	Giải Âm nhạc Cống hiến (Contributing music awards)	Producer of the year	SlimV	Won
2025	Giải Âm nhạc Cống hiến (Contributing music awards)	Male singer of the year	Quốc Thiên	Nominated
2025	Giải Âm nhạc Cống hiến (Contributing music awards)	Male singer of the year	SOOBIN	Won
2025	Vietnam iContent Awards	Inspiring video	Anh trai vượt ngàn chông gai concert	Won
2025	Vietnam iContent Awards	Digital icon of the year	Anh trai vượt ngàn chông gai concert	Nominated
2025	WeYoung	Iconic Concert	Anh trai vượt ngàn chông gai concert	Nominated
2025	FChoice	Sponsor bank of the year	Techcombank	Won
2026	Giải Mai Vàng (Golden shell award)	Most favorite group	Chín Muồi house	Won
2026	Giải Mai Vàng (Golden shell award)	Most favorite group	Xương Rồng house	Nominated

=== Achievements ===
- VTV awarded certificates of merit to the program Anh trai vượt ngàn chông gai as an "impressive entertainment program, which has made contributions to honoring cultural and national values" at the finale of the show on December 14, 2024.
- The show's series of concerts was awarded by Ministry of Culture, Sports & Tourism in the category of "Outstanding Performance Program of the Year" at the 2024 Program Introducing Outstanding Artists and Notable Books in the Field of Performing Arts and Literature.
- The show's third concert in Ho Chi Minh City on March 22, 2025 was recognized by Guinness World Records as the "Event with the largest number of participants wearing Vietnamese traditional costumes" with over 5,000 people participated.

== Aftermath ==
Jun Phạm, BB Trần, S.T Sơn Thạch, Kay Trần and Bùi Công Nam officially formed the group B.O.F after the show. The name B.O.F has multiple layers of meaning, combining "Boys On Fire" (passion on stage), "Boys Over Flower" (attraction from individual brilliance), and "Boys Friend" (a close, warm spirit). Operating under the management of 1Label company, the group released their debut song "Tết đỉnh nóc" (Over the top Tết) on January 4, 2025. Then, on the evening of May 14, 2025, the group officially launched a "debut" single titled "No Fair," inspired by villains from fairy tales, cartoons, comics, and classic legends.

== Side activities ==
=== Anh trai vượt ngàn chông gai 2024 concerts ===
On August 31, 2024, the show's producer announced plans to organize the first Anh trai vượt ngàn chông gai 2024 Concert. The event was held on October 19, 2024, at Ravopark by the Saigon River, part of The Metropole Thu Thiem (Song Viet) complex, in Thủ Đức Ward, Hồ Chí Minh City. The concert attracted approximately 20,000 attendees, and the organizers donated 1 billion VND to the Thủ Đức Nghĩa Tình fund. During the concert, the show's producers announced a second date at Hanoi, with the venue being in Vinhomes Ocean Park 3, Hưng Yên.

The show then announced a double date concert (being the third and fourth show) at The Global City, An Phu Ward, Thu Duc City, Ho Chi Minh City. After the 4th night, in response to the audience's call, the producer confirmed that the fifth and sixth shows would be held on June 14 and 15 of the same year at Vinhomes Ocean Park 3 in Van Giang, Hung Yen, where the second concert was previously held. The producer later announced that the 2 concerts on September 6 and 7 at The Global City, Bình Trưng, Ho Chi Minh City will officially be the final leg of the concert series, although this statement is rather false as later on, the show had organized a ninth date at Ocean Park 3 on April 26, 2026.

==== Concert dates ====
Date	City	Country	Venue
October 19, 2024	Ho Chi Minh City	Vietnam	Ravopark
December 14, 2024	Hanoi	Vietnam	Vinhomes Ocean Park 3
March 22, 2025	Ho Chi Minh City	Vietnam	The Global City
March 23, 2025	Ho Chi Minh City	Vietnam	The Global City
June 14, 2025	Hanoi	Vietnam	Vinhomes Ocean Park 3
June 15, 2025	Hanoi	Vietnam	Vinhomes Ocean Park 3
September 6, 2025	Ho Chi Minh City	Vietnam	The Global City
September 7, 2025	Ho Chi Minh City	Vietnam	The Global City
April 26, 2026	Hanoi	Vietnam	Vinhomes Ocean Park 3

=== Mưa lửa: Anh trai vượt ngàn chông gai The Movie ===
At the show's second concert at December 14, 2024, the producer announced a special documentary project called Mưa lửa: Anh trai vượt ngàn chông gai The Movie, along with the third concert schedule expected to take place in March 2025. According to the producer, this is an authentic film about the journey of creating a memorable summer with 33 talented individuals.

On April 28, 2025, the official poster along with the title "Rain of Fire" for the film was announced. The film officially premiered on May 16, 2025, almost a year after the broadcast, compiling moments from the show as well as performances.

=== Anh trai vượt ngàn chông gai 2026 concerts ===
In August 2026, the show's producer announced plans to organize the first Anh trai vượt ngàn chông gai 2026 Concert.

==== Concert dates ====
Date	City	Country	Venue
October 17, 2026	Ho Chi Minh City	Vietnam	The Global City
October 18, 2026	Ho Chi Minh City	Vietnam	The Global City
