= Call Me by Fire season 1 =

Chinese reality television show

- Traditional Chinese: 披荊斬棘的哥哥
- Simplified Chinese: 披荆斩棘的哥哥
- Literal meaning: Big brothers cutting through thorns
- Hanyu Pinyin: pī jīng zhǎn jí de gēgē
- Genre: Reality
- Presented by: Liu Tao
- Country of origin: China
- Original language: Mandarin
- No. of seasons: 1
- No. of episodes: 12

Production
- Camera setup: Multi-camera
- Running time: 94–208 minutes

Original release
- Network: Mango TV
- Release: 12 August – 29 October 2021

Related
- Call Me by Fire season 2 Sisters Who Make Waves; Boyhood (哥哥的少年时代); Definition (定义); Night in the Greater Bay (大湾仔的夜); Braving Life (我们的滚烫人生); Call Me by Fire Vietnam

Call Me by Fire (Chinese: 披荆斩棘的哥哥; pinyin: pī jīng zhǎn jí de gēgē; lit. 'Big brothers cutting through thorns') is a 2021 Chinese singing reality television show broadcast on Mango TV. It features 33 male celebrities who have been in the entertainment industry for close to ten years or more competing to form a 17-member performance group. The show aired from August 12 to October 29, 2021, with 12 episodes in total.

It is a spin-off of the well-received Sisters Who Make Waves, which featured a similar premise with female celebrities. Both shows followed in the footsteps of trending idol group audition programs like Produce 101 and Idol Producer, with Call Me by Fire aiming to put together a range of experienced male entertainers and provide them opportunities to collaborate on stage.

Aside from the main episodes, there are also special "Plus" episodes that can be accessed through paid subscription to Mango TV, featuring additional behind-the-scenes footage not aired in the main show.

A second season premiered on August 19, 2022, featuring 4 members of Season 1's final "Singing Family" group, alongside 28 new celebrity contestants.

In 2024, the Vietnamese production company named YeaH1 purchased the rights to the show's format and broadcast a reality show titled Call Me by Fire Vietnam. The program is jointly produced by the Arts Department of Vietnam Television (VTV) and 1Production, a subsidiary of YeaH1.

== Format ==
The competition is carried out through a series of concerts, with the contestants performing in groups. Depending on the round's specific rules, the audience and a panel of industry experts vote for their favourite group performances and/or individual contestants. The resulting rankings determine which contestants are eliminated and/or how groupings are shuffled. Voting scores are also tabulated as "firepower," which acts as currency for contestant groups during bidding for the following concert's song selection and performance order.

The show opened with a "Premiere Concert" introducing the 33 contestants. This was followed by five rounds with different groupings and concert themes. At the end of the fifth round, the remaining 22 contestants competed in a final "Family Formation Night" concert that determined the successful members of the ultimate 17-member performance group.

Aside from segments related to the formal competition such as rehearsals and bidding, the show also features contestants' dormitory life and informal group activities like a talent show or cook-off.

== Contestants ==
The contestants' names within both the English and Chinese language entertainment industries are shown. Top 17 contestants will debut as a group on the show's finale.

Name		Profession	Birthdate (Age)
Bridge	布瑞吉	Rapper	November 4, 1993 (age 32)
Cannon Hu Haiquan (Member of rock duet Yu Quan)	胡海泉	Actor, singer, host	August 13, 1975 (age 51)
Chen Hui (Member of rock band Faces Band)	陈辉	Lead singer	January 1, 1973 (age 53)
Edmond Leung Hon-man	梁漢文	Singer-songwriter, actor	November 5, 1971 (age 54)
GAI	周延	Rapper	March 22, 1987 (age 39)
Henry Huo Zun	霍尊	Singer-songwriter	September 18, 1990 (age 36)
Henry Prince Mak (Former member of JJCC)	麦亨利	Singer	May 24, 1990 (age 36)
James Lee (Former member of Royal Pirates)	李铢衔	Bassist, keyboardist	June 9, 1988 (age 38)
Jerry Lamb Hiu-fung	林曉峰	Actor	September 28, 1970 (age 56)
Jerry Yan	言承旭	Actor, singer	January 1, 1977 (age 49)
Jordan Chan Siu-chun	陈小春	Actor, singer	July 8, 1967 (age 59)
Julian Cheung Chi-lam	张智霖	Actor, singer	August 27, 1971 (age 55)
Kido Gao Hanyu	高瀚宇	Actor, singer	February 6, 1989 (age 37)
Leon Zhang Yunlong	张云龙	Actor, singer	March 2, 1988 (age 38)
Li Xiang	李响	Dancer	January 4, 1992 (age 34)
Li Yundi	李云迪	Pianist	October 7, 1982 (age 44)
Liu Cong / Key.L	刘聪	Rapper	August 13, 1988 (age 38)
Liu Duanduan	刘端端	Actor, singer	June 4, 1986 (age 40)
Liu Jia	刘迦	Dancer	September 20, 1991 (age 35)
Max Zhang Jin	张晋	Actor, martial artist	May 19, 1974 (age 52)
MC HotDog	热狗	Rapper	April 10, 1978 (age 48)
MC Jin	欧阳靖	Rapper, actor	June 4, 1982 (age 44)
Michael Tse Tin-wah	谢天华	Actor, singer	July 15, 1967 (age 59)
Nathan Lee Seung-hyun	李承铉	Singer, actor	October 30, 1984 (age 41)
Owodog	敖犬	Singer, actor	October 30, 1982 (age 43)
Paul Wong Koon-chung (Member of Beyond)	黄贯中	Lead singer	March 31, 1964 (age 62)
Pax Congo / Bai Jugang	白举纲	Singer-songwriter	November 2, 1993 (age 32)
Ricky (Member of rock band Click#15)	瑞奇	Lead singer, guitarist	December 19, 1988 (age 37)
Shawn Huang Zheng	黄征	Singer, actor	December 12, 1973 (age 52)
Terry Lin	林志炫	Singer	July 6, 1966 (age 60)
Vincent Zhao Wenzhuo (Also known as Chiu Man-cheuk)	赵文卓	Actor, martial artist	April 10, 1972 (age 54)
Welly Zhang Qi (Member of Black Panther 黑豹乐队)	张淇	Lead singer	January 22, 1981 (age 45)
Yin Zheng	尹正	Actor	December 30, 1986 (age 39)

== Synopsis ==
=== Premiere Concert ===
Theme: The First Meeting, Pleased to Meet You

The contestants are introduced to the rules and to one another. They are then assigned to groups of similar skills for their first introductory performances. Each group stage featured short individual performances of different songs, with the final song continuing into a full group performance to end off. After each stage, the audience voted for their favourite member in the group, with the top-ranking member gaining 100 firepower for the next round. After all 8 group stages, the 33 contestants performed a closing song together.

This premiere concert was hosted by Qi Sijun alongside three contestants from Sisters Who Make Waves: Baby Zhang and Shen Mengchen from Season 1, and Yang Yuying from Season 2.

Group	Members	Songs
Singers	Julian Cheung, Edmond Leung, Terry Lin	祝君好 (Wish You Well), 拔河 (Tug of War), 瞬间永恒 (Instant Eternity)
Singers	Pax Congo, Cannon Hu, Shawn Huang	玫瑰玫瑰我爱你 (Rose, Rose, I Love You), 飞鸟 (Stray Bird), 奔跑 (Run)
Dancers	James Lee, Nathan Lee, Henry Mak, Kido Gao	水星记 (Mercury), 天上飞 (Fly in the Sky), 神奇 (Magical), 情人 (Lover)
Dancers	Max Zhang, Yin Zheng, Liu Jia, Li Xiang, Owodog	倩女幽魂 (A Chinese Ghost Story), 独一无二 (Only One), 刀剑如梦 (Dream-like Sword), 不染 (Unstained), 失恋阵线联盟 (Lovelorn Front Alliance)
Actors	Vincent Zhao, Liu Duanduan, Leon Zhang, Li Yundi, Jerry Yan	漫漫人生路 (Long Road of Life), 心太软 (Too Softhearted), 心云 (Heart Cloud), 爱是永恒 (Love is Eternal), 流星雨 (Meteor Shower)
Actors	Jordan Chan, Michael Tse, Jerry Lamb	叱咤红人 (All-Star), 原来你什么都不想要 (So You Didn't Want Anything), 友情岁月 (Friendship Years)
Musicians	Ricky, Chen Hui, Welly Zhang, Paul Wong	夜夜夜夜 (Every Night), 幻觉 (Hallucination), 别来纠缠我 (Don't Bother Me), 不再犹豫 (No Longer Hesitating)
Rappers	MC HotDog, MC Jin, Bridge, Liu Cong, GAI	差不多先生 (Mr. Not Bad), Brother Man, 爱就爱了 (Love Love), 单身公寓 (Single Apartment), 沧海一生笑 (A Lifetime of Laughter)
Whole cast		笨小孩 (Stupid Child) by Andy Lau

=== First Performance ===
Theme: Outer Space Message Board

The contestants are split into 8 tribes with three to five members each, named after the respective tribe leader. Every tribe performed one song in the concert, with the two lowest-ranking tribes having to select one member to transfer out to another tribe.

Tribe	Members	Song
Jordan Chan Tribe	Michael Tse, Jordan Chan, Jerry Lamb, Julian Cheung, Edmond Leung	3189
Nathan Lee Tribe	Welly Zhang, Nathan Lee, James Lee, Henry Huo	Yellow (by Coldplay)
MC Jin Tribe	Shawn Huang, MC Jin, Owodog, Henry Mak	彩虹西服 Rainbow Suit
Bridge Tribe	GAI, Ricky, Bridge	站在高岗上 Stand on a High Hill
Terry Lin Tribe	Terry Lin, Li Yundi, Liu Jia, Li Xiang	爱 Love
Chen Hui Tribe	Paul Wong, Chen Hui, Jerry Yan, Liu Duanduan, Leon Zhang	淒美地 Poignantly
Max Zhang Tribe	Max Zhang, Kido Gao, Pax Congo	MMA
Vincent Zhao Tribe	Vincent Zhao, Cannon Hu, MC HotDog, Yin Zheng, Liu Cong	离开地球表面 Leaving Earth's Surface

=== Second Performance ===
Theme: The 25th Hour

In this round, tribes had to form an alliance with a second tribe to perform one "Vocal" category song and one "Perform" category song together. A limit of six performers per song was imposed. The voting scores for both songs were combined, with the lowest-ranking alliance having to select three members to send home.

Alliance	Performing Members	Song	Category
Chen Hui Tribe + MC Jin Tribe	Jerry Yan, Owodog, Liu Duanduan, Leon Zhang, Henry Mak	被驯服的象 Tamed Elephant	Perform
Chen Hui Tribe + MC Jin Tribe	Paul Wong, Chen Hui, Shawn Huang, MC Jin	明天更漫長 Tomorrow is Longer	Vocal
Max Zhang Tribe + Nathan Lee Tribe	Welly Zhang, Henry Huo, Pax Congo	悟空 Wu Kong / Monkey King	Vocal
Max Zhang Tribe + Nathan Lee Tribe	Max Zhang, Nathan Lee, Henry Huo, James Lee, Kido Gao, Pax Congo	鞋子特大号 Extra Large Shoes	Perform
Terry Lin Tribe + Vincent Zhao Tribe	Terry Lin, Cannon Hu, MC HotDog, Liu Jia	飞云之下 Under the Clouds	Vocal
Terry Lin Tribe + Vincent Zhao Tribe	Vincent Zhao, Li Yundi, Yin Zheng, Liu Cong, Ricky, Li Xiang	大艺术家 Great Artist	Perform
Jordan Chan Tribe + Bridge Tribe	Jordan Chan, Michael Tse, Julian Cheung, Edmond Leung, GAI, Bridge	往事只能回味 The Past Can Only Be Reminisced	Perform
Jordan Chan Tribe + Bridge Tribe	Jordan Chan, Michael Tse, Jerry Lamb, Edmond Leung, GAI, Bridge	你要如何我们就如何 We'll Do As You Wish	Vocal

=== Third Performance ===
Theme: Wait for Me to Find You

The alliances of the previous round were dissolved and the eight tribes reorganised into four larger camps, named after the respective camp leader. Like the previous round, each camp had to perform one "Vocal" category song and one "Perform" category song. However, this round was conducted in two halves, with two camps competing directly in each half. Audience and expert panel voting determined the losing camp of each half, as well as the individual contestant ranking in each camp. The losing camp would then have to vote within itself to eliminate one of its three lowest-ranking members.

Camp	Performing Members	Song	Category
First Half
Nathan Lee Camp	Paul Wong, Welly Zhang, Nathan Lee, James Lee	花祭 Flower Festival	Vocal
Nathan Lee Camp	Paul Wong, Welly Zhang, MC Jin, Ricky, Liu Jia	不超级的马里奥 Non-Super Mario	Perform
Vincent Zhao Camp	Terry Lin, Shawn Huang, Jerry Yan, Leon Zhang	偶然 Accidentally	Vocal
Vincent Zhao Camp	Vincent Zhao, MC HotDog, Liu Cong, Henry Mak	夏夜晚风 Summer Night Wind	Perform
Second Half
Max Zhang Camp	Max Zhang, Cannon Hu, Yin Zheng, Kido Gao, Pax Congo	什么是快乐星球 What is a Happy Planet	Vocal
Max Zhang Camp	Max Zhang, Yin Zheng, Owodog, Kido Gao, Li Xiang	好春光 Good Spring	Perform
Jordan Chan Camp	Julian Cheung, Edmond Leung, Jerry Lamb, Li Yundi	护花使者 Messenger of Flowers	Vocal
Jordan Chan Camp	Jordan Chan, Michael Tse, GAI, Bridge	摇滚怎么了 What's Up With Rock	Perform

=== Fourth Performance ===
Theme: Thirty Thousand Days

Continuing with the camps from the previous round, this round was further divided into three showdowns featuring solo, duet and full camp performances. Only the camp with the top overall ranking would be safe from elimination and proceed to the next round without reshuffling members. Meanwhile, the four lowest-ranking members across the remaining three camps were sent home.

	Camp	Performing Member(s)	Song
Solo	Nathan Lee Camp	Welly Zhang	战 War
Solo	Jordan Chan Camp	Jordan Chan	算你狠 You Are Vicious
Solo	Vincent Zhao Camp	Terry Lin	空 Empty
Solo	Max Zhang Camp	Yin Zheng	一剪梅 A Spray of Plum Blossoms
Duet	Max Zhang Camp	Max Zhang, Kido Gao	跳舞街 Dancing Street
Duet	Vincent Zhao Camp	Terry Lin, MC HotDog	曾经我也想过一了百了 I've Thought About It a Hundred Times
Duet	Nathan Lee Camp	MC Jin, Nathan Lee	你要跳舞吗 Do You Want to Dance
Duet	Jordan Chan Camp	Edmond Leung, GAI	无名之辈 Anonymous
Camp	Vincent Zhao Camp	Vincent Zhao, MC HotDog, Leon Zhang, Jerry Yan, Terry Lin, Shawn Huang, Liu Cong	这世界那么多人 Empty World
Camp	Nathan Lee Camp	Paul Wong, Welly Zhang, MC Jin, Nathan Lee, James Lee, Ricky, Liu Jia	达拉崩吧 Dalabengba
Camp	Max Zhang Camp	Max Zhang, Yin Zheng, Owodog, Kido Gao, Pax Congo, Canon，Li Xiang	舍离断 Let Go
Camp	Jordan Chan Camp	Jordan Chan, Michael Tse, Julian Cheung, Edmond Leung, Jerry Lamb, GAI, Bridge	当年情 Past Love

=== Fifth Performance ===
Theme: Another Me in this World

The final group reshuffle occurred at the start of this round to form two main camps: "Qilin (麒麟) Camp" and "One Flower (一枝花) Camp," led by Nathan Lee and Max Zhang respectively. The two camps faced off in three group rounds, with members allowed to participate in only one performance each. One elimination slot was added each time a camp lost a group round, with the lowest-ranking member(s) in that camp filling in the slot(s) to be sent home.

	Camp	Performing Members	Song
Group 1	One Flower Camp	Jordan Chan, Cannon Hu, Jerry Yan, Kido Gao, Li Xiang	无所求必满载而归 Returning Full of Nothing
Group 1	Qilin Camp	Michael Tse, Ricky, Leon Zhang, Liu Jia	男孩別哭 Boy, Don't Cry
Group 2	One Flower Camp	Max Zhang, Julian Cheung, Yin Zheng	给电影人的情书 Love Letter to Filmmakers
Group 2	Qilin Camp	Edmond Leung, Jerry Lamb, Li Yundi, Nathan Lee	她来听我的演唱会 She Came to My Concert
Group 3	One Flower Camp	Terry Lin, Chen Hui, MC HotDog, GAI, Pax Congo	See You Again (Furious 7 soundtrack)
Group 3	Qilin Camp	Paul Wong, Vincent Zhao, James Lee, Welly Zhang, MC Jin	如果还有明天 If There's Still Tomorrow

=== Family Formation Night ===
This last competition stage to determine the winning members of the ultimate 17-member "Singing Family" was held in three rounds. The Qilin and One Flower Camps were maintained, with the winning camp gaining 3 Family slots in the first two rounds and 5 Family slots in the third round. These 11 slots were filled based on the individual member rankings in each camp. The last 6 Family slots were awarded to the 6 highest-ranking contestants from the remaining 11 without considering their camp.

Two special titles were also awarded:

- "X-Fire" — top-ranking member of each camp
- "X-Leader" — the leader of the camp with the higher total number of performance votes at the end of the night was crowned leader of the Family

	Camp	Performing Members	Song
Round 1 Camp Leader Battle	One Flower Camp	Julian Cheung, Max Zhang, Cannon Hu, Yin Zheng, Kido Gao, Li Xiang, Pax Congo	My Boo
Round 1 Camp Leader Battle	Qilin Camp	Nathan Lee, Leon Zhang, James Lee, Liu Jia	Papillon
Round 2 Small Group Showdown	Qilin Camp	Paul Wong, Michael Tse, Jerry Lamb, Vincent Zhao, Welly Zhang, MC Jin	友情岁月 Years of Friendship
Round 2 Small Group Showdown	One Flower Camp	Terry Lin, Jordan Chan, MC HotDog, Jerry Yan, GAI	海阔天空 Wide Sea and Sky
Round 3 Camp Final Face-off	Qilin Camp	Nathan Lee, Welly Zhang, Paul Wong, Michael Tse, Jerry Lamb, Vincent Zhao, MC Jin, Leon Zhang, James Lee, Liu Jia	星辰大海 Sea of Stars
Round 3 Camp Final Face-off	One Flower Camp	Max Zhang, Terry Lin, Jordan Chan, Julian Cheung, MC HotDog, Cannon Hu, Yin Zheng, Jerry Yan, GAI, Kido Gao, Li Xiang, Pax Congo	存在 Existence

The concert also featured special celebratory performances by guests and eliminated contestants.

Performer(s)	Song
Faces Band (Chen Hui, Ouyang, Wu Jindi, Liu Zong); Piping Hot Band (Edmond Leung, Shawn Huang, Liu Cong, Ricky, Henry Mak, Bridge)	滚烫乐队.唱演人生 Piping Hot Band, Singing Life
Karen Mok, Jerry Yan, MC Jin, James Lee	如果沒有你 If There Wasn't You
Faces Band (Ouyang, Wu Jindi), Piping Hot Band (Shawn Huang, Owodog, Ricky, Liu Duanduan)	滚烫乐队.滚烫友谊 Piping Hot Band, Piping Hot Friendship
Max Zhang, Ada Choi	倩女幽魂 A Chinese Ghost Story
Nathan Lee, Stephy Qi	天上飞 Fly in the Sky
Edmond Leung, Chen Hui, Owodog, Liu Cong	滚烫乐队.滚烫告别 Piping Hot Band, Piping Hot Farewell
Ning Jing (Sisters Who Make Waves Season 1 contestant)	Call Me by Fire
Whole cast of Call Me by Fire (including eliminated contestants)	敬酒歌 Toast Song

== Results ==
The contestants' names within both the English and Chinese language entertainment industries are shown. Top 17 contestants will debut as a group on the show's finale.

Eliminated	Revived	Did not participate	Withdrew

Name		Premiere Concert	First Performance (Note: In this round, only the tribe rankings were tabulated.)	Second Performance	Third Performance (Note: In this round, only the losing camps' individual rankings were announced.)	Fourth Performance	Fifth Performance	Final Ranking
Jordan Chan Siu-chun	陈小春	2	4	3	4	1	4	1 (X-Fire)
Nathan Lee Seung-hyun	李承铉	6	1	11	—	2	3	2 (X-Fire)
Julian Cheung Chi-lam	张智霖	7	4	1	7	6	2	3
Welly Zhang Qi	张淇	15	1	9	—	5	8	4
Jerry Yan	言承旭	5	6	2	5	8	7	5
Paul Wong Koon-chung	黄贯中	4	6	12	—	9	5	6
Max Zhang Jin	张晋	9	5	13	—	3	1	7 (X-Leader)
Terry Lin	林志炫	1	3	4	3	4	6	8
MC HotDog	热狗	8	2	6	13	12	9	9
MC Jin	欧阳靖	14	8	17	— (Note: Following Henry Huo's departure from the show, MC Jin was brought back as he had the highest ranking of the previous round's eliminated members.)	7	19	10
Vincent Zhao Wenzhuo	赵文卓	19	2	22	16	15	16	11
Liu Jia	刘迦	22	3	10	—	11	10	12
GAI	周延	3	7	7	14	19	17	13
Kido Gao Hanyu	高瀚宇	24	5	15	—	10	13	14
Michael Tse Tin-wah	谢天华	23	4	21	17	16	12	15
Pax Congo / Bai Jugang	白举纲	25	5	22	—	22	21	16
Leon Zhang Yunlong	张云龙	28	6	8	12	17	14	17
Cannon Hu Hai Quan	胡海泉	16	2	14	—	21	11	18
Jerry Lamb Hiu-fung	林曉峰	17	4	18	24	23	18	19
Yin Zheng	尹正	27	2	16	—	13	23	20
Li Xiang	李响	29	3	19	—	14	15	21
James Lee	李铢衔	13	1	24	—	18	22	22
Edmond Leung Hon-man	梁漢文	26	4	26	21	24	25	—
Ricky	瑞奇	11	7	27	—	20	24	—
Shawn Huang Zheng	黄征	31	8	30	28	—	—	—
Owodog	敖犬	33	8	32	—	—	—	—
Bridge	布瑞吉	18	7	25	27	—	—	—
Liu Cong / Key.L	刘聪	21	2	— (Note: Liu Cong was unable to perform in this round due to COVID-19 quarantine measures.)	25	—	—	—
Henry Prince Mak	麦亨利	30	8	28	30	—	—	—
Chen Hui	陈辉	20	6	29	—	—	26 (Note: Chen Hui was brought back as a "reserve member" in this round, but he was ultimately eliminated again.)	—
Liu Duanduan	刘端端	32	6	31	—	—	—	—
Li Yundi	李云迪	12	3	19	22	—	— (Note: Li Yundi was brought back as a "reserve member" in this round and made the cut for the next round, but was edited out and pulled from the show due to a personal scandal.)	—
Henry Huo Zun	霍尊	10	1	5	—	—	—	—

== Spin-offs ==
Two spin-off shows aired concurrently with Call Me by Fire, featuring various contestants: Brothers' Boyhood (哥哥的少年时代) put contestants in a schoolroom setting to play various games, while Definition (定义) served as a talkshow with sit-down interviews.

Cooking reality show Night in the Greater Bay (大湾仔的夜) premiered in November 2021, shortly after the final episode of Call Me by Fire, featuring Jordan Chan, Julian Cheung, Michael Tse, Jerry Lamb and Edmond Leung. These five Hong Kong celebrities were known informally as the "Greater Bay Brothers" after forming the "Jordan Chan tribe" in the First Performance round. They were tasked with running a small eatery modelled after dai pai dong, an iconic part of Hong Kong food culture.

In December 2021, another spin-off show Braving Life (我们的滚烫人生) began airing, featuring various contestants such as Jordan Chan, Julian Cheung, Max Zhang, Welly Zhang and Nathan Lee. The cast experienced six different ordinary yet extraordinary professions such as firefighting and teaching, with each visit ending with a live concert to thank and celebrate the people in each profession.

== International versions ==
Country	Title	Network	Release	Notes
Vietnam	Call Me by Fire Vietnam	VTV	29 June – 19 October 2024 (season 1) 27 June 2026 (season 2)	
