= Nguyễn Văn Chung =

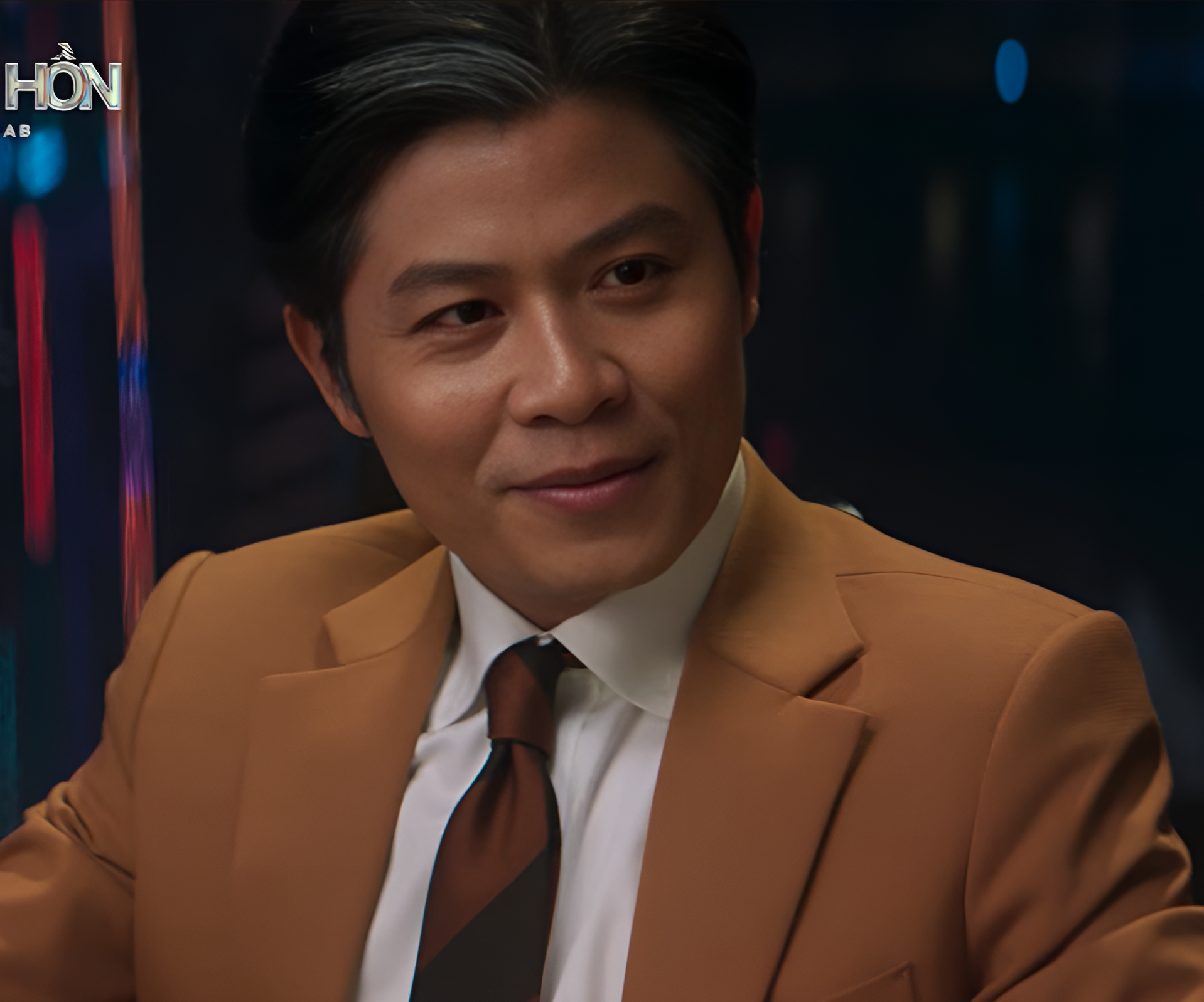
- Nguyễn Văn Chung in 2026
- Born: April 12, 1983 (age 43); Ho Chi Minh City, Vietnam
- Years active: 2003–present
- Musical career
- Origin: Ho Chi Minh City, Vietnam
- Genres: V-pop; ballad; R&B; romantic; country
- Instruments: Vocals; piano

Nguyễn Văn Chung (born April 12, 1983) is a Vietnamese musician and singer. He was honored four times in a row in the "Top 10 Most Loved Songwriters" of the Green Wave Awards from 2009 to 2012, as well as receiving four nominations for the Dedication Music Awards in 2013 and 2020.

== Life and career ==
Nguyen Van Chung was born on April 12, 1983 in Ho Chi Minh City. After graduating from Le Hong Phong High School, he studied at the Faculty of Foreign Languages, majoring in Tourism, Ho Chi Minh City University of Foreign Languages – Information Technology. In his first year of university, Nguyen Van Chung fell in love with a girl from Long Xuyen. Later, this girl settled in the US, and Nguyen Van Chung received no news from her. He began composing music to share his sadness and longing for his first love.

Initially, Chung's songwriting was amateur. But his works were very well received by the public and he gained a firm foothold in the music industry. The first song when Nguyen Van Chung started his career was "The Old Teacher," which was bought and performed by singer Nguyen Vu, achieving great success. After that, Nguyen Van Chung signed a professional contract with Nhac Xanh company and released his first songs such as "Night of Love," "Crying Moon," "Love That I Carry," "Crystal Dream," etc.

Sometime later, Nguyen Van Chung met and fell in love with another girl named Kim Thanh, who would later become his wife. This tumultuous but ultimately happy love story gave Nguyen Van Chung endless inspiration for his creative work. Nguyen Van Chung said that there was a time when he thought he would lose her forever, but in the end, they were able to see each other again and bring each other happy smiles. In August 2020, he confirmed that he had divorced Kim Thanh.

Currently, Nguyen Van Chung is running Silver Lion Entertainment, a company specializing in training and managing singers. By November 2025, Nguyen Van Chung officially announced that he had become a student at the Ho Chi Minh City Conservatory of Music, majoring in music pedagogy, with a score of 21.17.

== Collaboration ==
Musician Nguyen Van Chung has collaborated musically with many singers. During the period of about 2003–2007, he collaborated with the group GMC, Nhat Tinh Anh and Khanh Ngoc, most notably with hit songs like "Night of Love Under the Moonlight" and "Crying Moon". The albums "Rain Starts Love", "My Love Remains the Same" (Nhat Tinh Anh); "Like a Dream", "Crystal Love" (Khanh Ngoc) used Chung's songs as the title tracks of the albums.

=== Phan Dinh Tung ===
This was featured in Tùng Chung's album (December 2008, combining the singer's name with the songwriter's name). A mishap occurred in the album: the song "If You Weren't a Dream," composed by Nguyễn Văn Chung, shared the same title and concept as a song by Thủy Tiên. The reason was that both artists collaborated on the song after reading the novel of the same name by author Marc Levy.

"Rap came to me like a friend. We shared emotions, feelings, and thoughts together. Rap gave me many opportunities to get closer to my audience and those who love me. Now, rap is no longer just a job; it's more like a life partner."

When Chung goes through difficult times or experiences in life, all of that becomes the raw material and inspiration for his music. If he can maintain his passion and dedication, Chung believes he can write music for the rest of his life.

Musician Nguyen Van Chung speaks at the launch of his music book commemorating his 20-year songwriting journey, in Tuoi Tre newspaper.

Prior to the Tùng Chung album, Phan Đinh Tùng had also performed many songs by Nguyễn Văn Chung, most notably "Ngồi bên em" (Sitting Beside You). After the Tùng Chung album, Nguyễn Văn Chung collaborated with Phan Đinh Tùng on several more songs, such as "Hãy cứ là em" (Just Be You) (lyrics added).

=== Cao Thai Son ===
Composed 4 exclusive songs including the title track for the album Vol.7 Rainy Road in 2009, continued to collaborate on the title track and another song in the album Vol.8 – Rainbow After the Rain in 2010.

=== Akira Phan ===
Akira Phan's success with his first album, "Stand Up and Stretch" (August 2008), was largely due to Nguyen Van Chung. His two songs, "Winter Is Not Cold" and "Stand Up and Stretch," were very popular with young people, especially "Winter Is Not Cold," which brought Akira Phan closer to his audience. After this album, Akira Phan performed many more songs by Nguyen Van Chung, such as "Frozen Memories," "Paper Star Tree," etc.

=== Khanh Phuong ===
Following the success of "The Warm Wind Scarf," other songs by Chung performed by Khanh Phuong include "Suddenly I Love You," "Far Beyond the Clouds," "Just the Past," etc.

=== Miu Le ===
Miu Lê has performed songs by Nguyễn Văn Chung such as: "The Poem in Purple Ink," "The Picture in My Heart," "A Gift for You," and "Forget as If You Never Loved."

=== Ngo Trac Linh ===
Ngo Trac Linh is one of the four members of the Angels music group, trained by musician Nguyen Van Chung.

=== Other singers ===
There are many other singers who have performed Nguyen Van Chung's compositions, most notably Cam Ly, Xuan Mai, Quang Vinh, Tan Khanh, Chuong Dan, Nguyen Vu, Hoang Yen Chibi, Quan A.P, Dong Nhi...

Nguyen Van Chung's songwriting project is not limited to top singers but also extends to young singers who want to find their place in the current V-Pop market. Besides the names mentioned above, we can also mention: Tim (Cat Vu) (Priceless Gift), Huynh Nha Lam (Hill of Sunflowers), Nakun Nam Cuong (Flying in the Milky Way), Hoang Nhan (Reaching for Love), Tan Khanh (Love Story Under the Rain), JK Tuan Minh (Need a Love)... In addition, his songs have also been covered by a few singers such as Hoang Yen Chibi (Hill of Sunflowers...), Quan A.P and Dong Nhi (Crying Moon).

Composer Nguyen Van Chung has also tried his hand at singing (the song "The Shadow of the Clouds"), but he has no intention of becoming a singer yet.

Nguyen Van Chung has made many top hits in the V-Pop scene.

In 2024, Nguyen Van Chung composed a song in the sentimental folk music genre with the song "Xot Luc Binh Troi" performed by Chan Minh.

In 2025, Nguyen Van Chung composed the song "Pain Amidst Peace" performed by singer Hoa Minzy. The song is the ending theme of the movie Red Rain. The MV "Pain Amidst Peace" – Hoa Minzy is considered a spin-off of the movie about the character Ta and his family.

== Personal life ==
Nguyen Van Chung married Kim Thanh in 2012, but divorced her 8 years later. He and Kim Thanh have a son together named Hieu Long (Bu). He has an adopted daughter named Kim Anh (Suri) (who is the daughter of his sister).

== Comment ==
Nguyen Van Chung's compositions are all meticulously crafted and have achieved considerable success. Even renowned musicians have praised his talent. Composer Nguyen Ngoc Thien commented: "Honestly, when I heard 'The Warm Wind Scarf,' I was captivated. From a professional perspective, Nguyen Van Chung has made significant progress in developing the song's structure. The love story in 'The Warm Wind Scarf' truly has a clear progression and climax. Clearly, Chung has invested time and effort into this song. From a listener's perspective, I am convinced by this love that involves sacrifice. A noble love is the easiest thing to melt a person's heart. I'm not surprised that this song is so popular with audiences."

== Awards and honors ==
=== Awards ===
Year	Award	Category	Nominee	Result	Ref.
2009	Làn Sóng Xanh	Top 10 Most Popular Composers	Himself	Won	
2010	Làn Sóng Xanh	Top 10 Most Popular Composers	Himself	Won	
2011	Làn Sóng Xanh	Top 10 Most Popular Composers	Himself	Won	
2012	Làn Sóng Xanh	Top 10 Most Popular Composers	Himself	Won	
2013	Dedication Awards	Song of the Year	"Nhật ký của mẹ" (Mother's Diary)	Nominated	
2013	Dedication Awards	Composer of the Year	Himself	Nominated	
2020	Dedication Awards	Album of the Year	Chung 36	Nominated	
2020	Dedication Awards	Composer of the Year	Himself	Nominated	
2025	Harper's Bazaar Star Awards	Composer of the Year (Patriotic Pop)	Himself	Won	
2025	Vietnam iContent Awards	Inspirational Music	"Viết tiếp câu chuyện hòa bình"	Nominated	
2025	Vietnam iContent Awards	Special Song of the Year	"Viết tiếp câu chuyện hòa bình"	Won	
2025	VCEP Awards	Creative and Impressive Composer	Himself	Won	
2025	Vạn Xuân Awards	Commercial Composer of the Year	Himself	Won	
2025	HTV Chào Xuân 2026	Impressive Song of the Year	"Viết tiếp câu chuyện hòa bình"	Won	
2025	HTV Chào Xuân 2026	Impressive MV of the Year	"Viết tiếp câu chuyện hòa bình"	Nominated	
2025	HTV Chào Xuân 2026	Impressive MV of the Year	"Nỗi đau giữa hòa bình"	Nominated	
2025	HTV Chào Xuân 2026	Impressive MV of the Year	"Việt Nam tự hào tiếp bước tương lai"	Nominated	
2025	Đẹp Awards	Outstanding Collaboration	Tùng Dương and Nguyễn Văn Chung	Won	
2025	Tinh hoa Việt	Composer of the Year	Himself	Nominated	
2025	Producer's Inside Picks & Awards	Composer of the Year	Himself	Nominated	
2025	Mai Vàng Award 2025	Music Video	"Việt Nam tự hào tiếp bước tương lai"	Nominated	
2025	Làn Sóng Xanh	Song of the Year	"Viết tiếp câu chuyện hòa bình"	Nominated	
2025	Làn Sóng Xanh	Special Award	"Viết tiếp câu chuyện hòa bình"	Won	
2025	Làn Sóng Xanh	Phenomenal Song	"Viết tiếp câu chuyện hòa bình"	Nominated	
2025	Làn Sóng Xanh	Favorite Movie Soundtrack	"Nỗi đau giữa hòa bình"	Nominated	
2025	WeChoice Awards	Inspirational Figure	Himself	Won	
2025	WeChoice Awards	Inspirational Ambassador	Himself	Nominated	
