= Mai Ngô =

Vietnamese model

Ngô Thị Quỳnh Mai
- Born: Hồ Chí Minh City, Vietnam
- Other name: Mai Ngô
- Occupation: Model
- Years active: 2012–

Ngô Thị Quỳnh Mai known professionally as Mai Ngô, is a Vietnamese model. She was the runner up of The Face Vietnam 2016, and fourth runner-up at Miss Grand Vietnam 2022.

== Career ==
Mai won F-Idol 2012 (Fashion Idol). In 2013, she reached the top 30 of So You Think You Can Dance season 2. Mai then participated in Vietnam's Next Top Model season 4 and reached the top 18.

In 2015, Mai entered Miss Universe Vietnam 2015, and reached the top 45. In 2016, she entered Asia's Next Top Model season 4, and reached the top 12. After that, Mai entered The Face Vietnam season 1 and was chosen to join the team of mentor Lan Khuê and was runner-up. In 2017, she reentered Miss Universe Vietnam 2017, and withdrew under pressure from public opinion and the press. Mai was voted Influencer Of The Year at Influence Asia 2017 by WeChoice Awards. In 2018, she played Mi Ngor in the movie Thạch Thảo directed by Mai Thế Hiệp. In 2020, Mai appeaered in Kẻ săn tin produced by Minh Hằng, in the same year she released the album Đoán xem. In 2022, she entered Miss Grand Vietnam 2022 and was fourth runner-up, and won six other awards.

In 2023, Mai was a coach for Miss International Queen Vietnam 2023 with Thủy Tiên, Quỳnh Châu, Quỳnh Hoa and her contestant Nguyễn Hà Dịu Thảo who won. In 2024, she became a mentor for The Next Gentleman Vietnam along with Mâu Thủy, Hương Ly, and Hoàng Thùy. Same year, Mai participated in The New Mentor program founded by Nguyễn Hương Giang. She became a runner-up of team Thanh Hằng.

In 2025, Mai represented Vietnam at Miss Charm 2025 in Vietnam, reaching the top 12, and winning the Miss Tourism award.

Awards and achievements
Preceded by Céline Duong	Vietnam at Asia's Next Top Model; 2016	Succeeded by Nguyễn Minh Tú
Preceded by First	Runner Up The Face Vietnam; 2016	Succeeded by Trương Mỹ Nhân
Preceded by First	4th Runner-Up Miss Grand Vietnam; 2022	Succeeded by Đặng Hoàng Tâm Như
Preceded by Nguyễn Thị Quỳnh Nga	Miss Charm Vietnam; 2025	Succeeded by Nguyễn Ngọc Trà My
Preceded by Võ Cao Kỳ Duyên	Miss Supranational Vietnam; 2026	Succeeded by Incumbent
