= Nguyễn Minh Tú =

Vietnamese actor and model

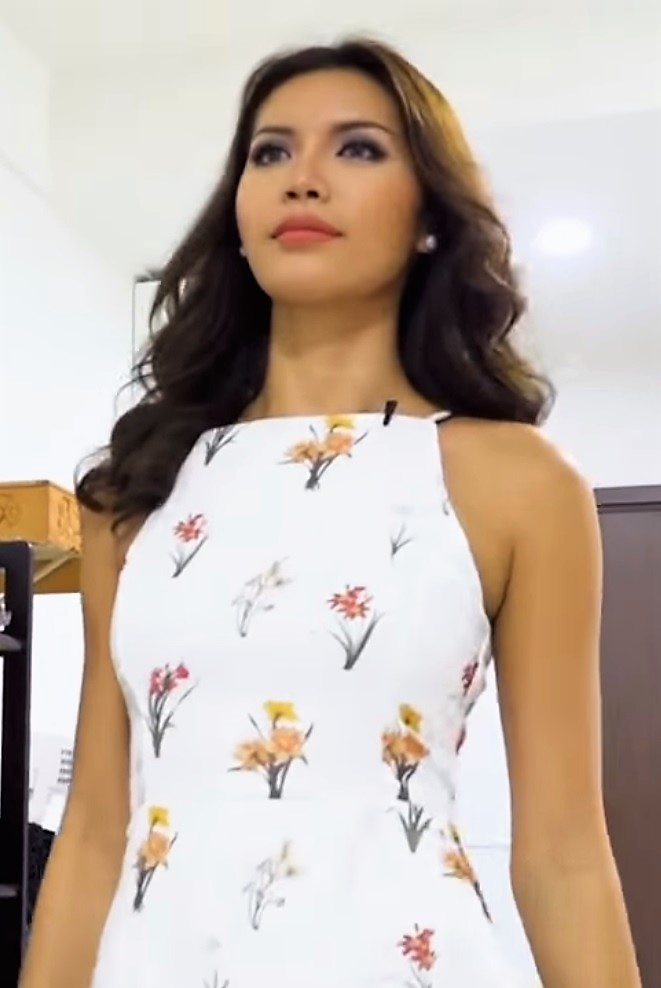
- Tú in 2017
- Born: Nguyễn Minh Tú; Hồ Chí Minh City, Vietnam
- Other names: Stella Tình, Thuý Liễu
- Occupations: Model; actor
- Years active: 2010–

Nguyễn Minh Tú is a Vietnamese model and actress. She was the runner-up in Asia's Next Top Model (season 5). In 2018, Tú represented Vietnam at Miss Supranational 2018, and reached the top 10.

== Career ==
In 2013, Tú won the silver prize of Vietnam Supermodel 2013.

In 2017, Tú was the runner-up of Asia's Next Top Model season 5. She was a mentor in The Face Vietnam season 2 with Lan Khuê, Hoàng Thùy and "The Look Vietnam" with Phạm Hương, Kỳ Duyên.

In 2018, Tú was an alumni mentor in Asia's Next Top Model season 6. She won Miss Supranational Asia 2018, and the awards for Best National Costume, Best Evening Performance and Top Model.

In 2019, Tú appeared in the movie Miss Gangster by director Lương Mạnh Hải. She was the guest judge of I am Miss Universe Vietnam 2019 with Mâu Thủy.

In 2020, Tú was the coach of Miss International Queen Vietnam 2020 contest with Hoàng Thùy, "Kiều Loan". In 2021, she appeared in the movie Dad, I'm Sorry by director Trấn Thành Tú was a judge for The Face Online by Vespa, a spin-off of The Face Vietnam.

In 2022, Tú and Duyên, Vân were the coaches for Miss Fitness Vietnam. She was a judge at Miss Grand Vietnam 2022, along with Anh Thư. In 2023, she continued as a judge for Miss Grand Vietnam 2023, along with "Diễm My 9X".

Awards and achievements
Preceded by Patricia Gunawan, Indonesia; Kim Sang In, South Korea	Asia's Next Top Model; Runners-up; Shikin Gomez, Malaysia; 2017 (season 5)	Succeeded by Adela Marshall, Philippines; Mia Sabathy, Taiwan
Preceded by Nguyễn Đình Khánh Phương	Miss Supranational Vietnam; 2018	Succeeded by Nguyễn Thị Ngọc Châu
Preceded by Gift Jiraprapa Boonnuang, Thailand	Miss Supranational Asia; 2018	Succeeded by Nguyễn Thị Ngọc Châu, Vietnam
Preceded by Ngô Thị Quỳnh Mai	Vietnam at Asia's Next Top Model; 2017	Succeeded by Nguyễn Phương Thanh Vy
