= Xuân Hạnh =

Vietnamese beauty pageant winner (born 2001)

Bùi Xuân Hạnh
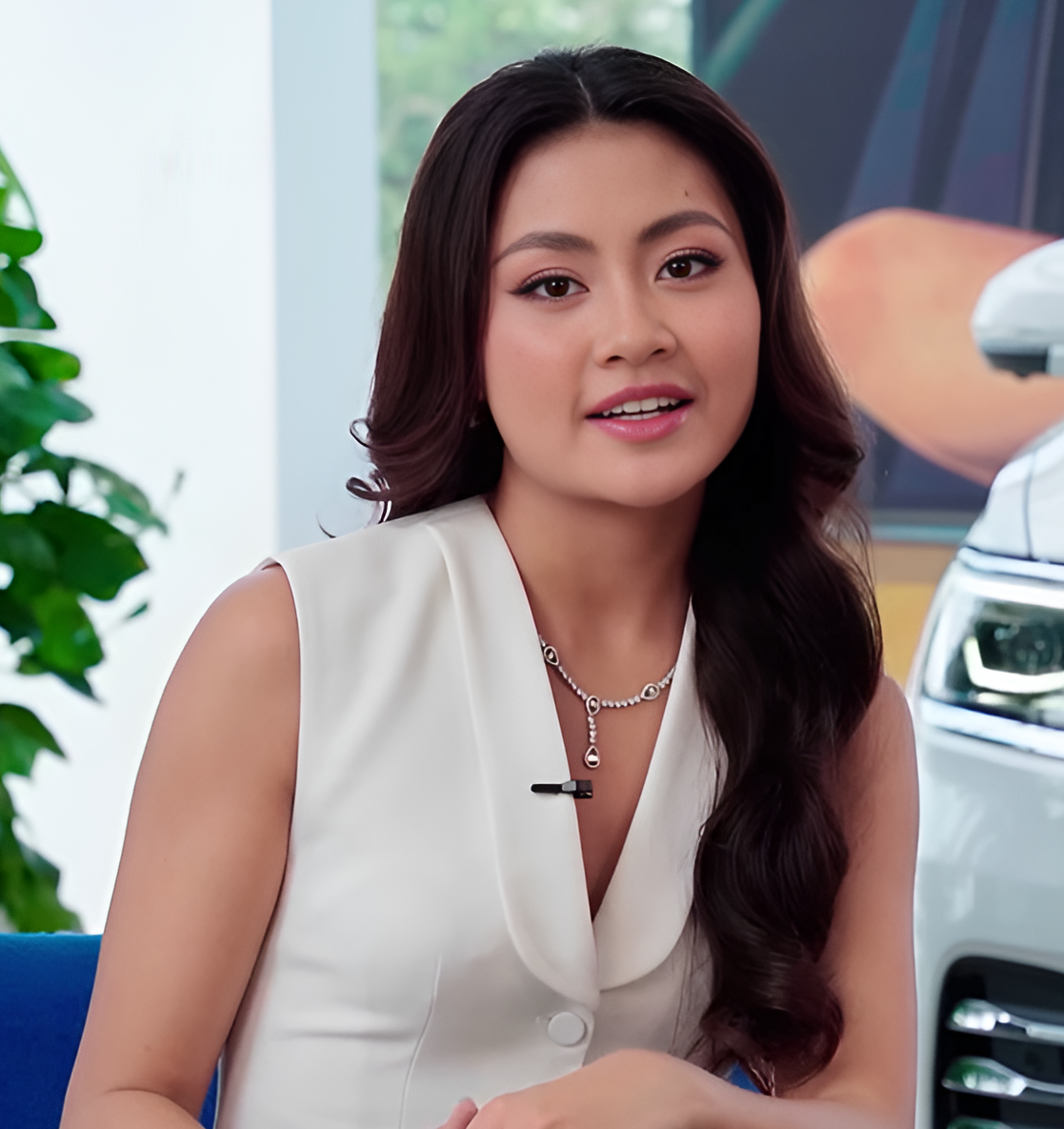
- Xuân Hạnh in 2024
- Born: Bùi Thị Xuân Hạnh; 21 October 2001 (age 24); Ninh Bình, Vietnam
- Education: National Economics University
- Beauty pageant titleholder
- Title: Miss Cosmo Vietnam 2023
- Major competitions: Miss Fitness Vietnam 2022 (Unplaced); Miss Cosmo Vietnam 2023 (Winner); Miss Cosmo 2024 (Top 5)

Bùi Thị Xuân Hạnh is a Vietnamese beauty pageant titleholder who won Miss Cosmo Vietnam 2023, and represented Vietnam at Miss Cosmo 2024 on 5 October 2024 in Vietnam. She was the runner-up of The Face Vietnam 2023.

== Early career ==
Xuan Hanh was born in 2001 in Ninh Bình, she studied at Luong Van Tuy High School for the Gifted and graduated from National Economics University.

== Career ==
=== The Face Vietnam 2023 ===
Xuan Hanh appeared in The Face Vietnam 2023 as a contestant of coach Vũ Thu Phương. In the final night of the competition, she won the runner-up position to Huỳnh Tú Anh from coach Anh Thư's team.

=== Miss Cosmo Vietnam 2023 ===
Xuan Hanh won Miss Cosmo Vietnam 2023, her first beauty pageant.

=== Miss Cosmo 2024 ===
As the winner of Miss Cosmo Vietnam 2023, represented Vietnam at Miss Cosmo 2024 in September 2024 in Ho Chi Minh City, and reached the top five.

== Filmography ==
- Người thừa kế không danh phận (2025)

Awards and achievements
Preceded by Nguyễn Thị Ngọc Châu	Miss Cosmo Vietnam; 2023	Succeeded by Nguyễn Hoàng Phương Linh
Preceded by Nguyễn Quỳnh Anh	Runner-up The Face Vietnam; 2023	Succeeded by Incumbent
Preceded by None	Miss Cosmo (Top 5); 2024	Succeeded by (Brazil) Gabriela Borges (Myanmar) Myint Myat Moe (Panama) Italy Mora
