= Nguyễn Quỳnh Anh =

Vietnamese model and beauty pageant titleholder

- Born: 14 November 1999 (age 27); Hanoi, Vietnam
- Education: Trade Union University
- Television: The Face Vietnam season 3; Supermodel Me season 6 (winner)
- Beauty pageant titleholder
- Major competitions: Miss Universe Vietnam 2024; (1st Runner-Up); Miss Universe Vietnam 2026; (Winner; Dethroned); Miss Universe 2026; (Withdrew)

Nguyễn Quỳnh Anh (born 14 November 1999) is a Vietnamese model and beauty pageant titleholder who won Miss Universe Vietnam 2026 but was stripped of her title after violating conditions of a six-month suspension. She previously won the sixth season of the multi-platform series Supermodel Me (2021).

== Early life and education ==
Quỳnh Anh was born in Hanoi. She studied human resource management at the Trade Union University and Ho Chi Minh City College of Tourism.

== Television career ==
=== 2018–2019: The Face Vietnam and Face of Asia ===
In 2018, Quỳnh Anh participated in the third season of the modeling reality television series The Face Vietnam as a contestant on Võ Hoàng Yến's team, finishing as the runner-up with contestant Trâm Anh (Minh Hằng's team); the winner belonged to Mạc Trung Kiên (Thanh Hằng's team).

In 2019, she entered the Top 10 of the Face of Asia with fellow Vietnamese contestants Trâm Anh and Tuấn Kiệt.

=== 2021: Supermodel Me ===
In 2021, Quỳnh Anh competed in the sixth season of the multi-platform series Supermodel Me, where she won, becoming the first Vietnamese contestant to win the competition.

== Pageantry ==
Quỳnh Anh entered her first beauty pageant Miss Universe Vietnam 2024, where she finished as the first runner-up. She won the Miss Universe Vietnam 2026 title, but after it was revealed Quỳnh Anh and runner-up Trịnh Mỹ Anh had made disparaging remarks about fellow contestants, the company that produces the pageant suspended Quỳnh Anh from performing activities related to her title for six months. Quỳnh Anh continued these activities and was stripped of her title 48 days after being crowned.

== Fashion show ==
Year	Role	Collection	Venue	Designer/ Brand	Ref
2020	Vedette	Hàng trống trong tôi	Vietnam International Fashion Week	Tùng Chinh	
2022		Fiori di Lillà	Milan Fashion Week	Vitelli	

Awards and achievements
Preceded by Nguyễn Hương Giang	Miss Universe Vietnam (Dethroned); 2026	Vacant
Preceded by Alexandria Brouhard (South Korea)	Winner of Supermodel Me; Season 6 (2021)	Succeeded by Habie Mondido (Philippines)
Preceded by Trương Mỹ Nhân	Runner-up of The Face Vietnam; Season 3 (2018)	Succeeded by Bùi Thị Xuân Hạnh
Preceded by Nguyễn Thị Hương Ly	1st Runner-up Miss Universe Vietnam; 2024	Succeeded by Trịnh Mỹ Anh
