= Miss Cosmo Vietnam 2023 =

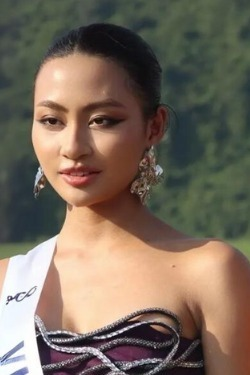
- Bùi Thị Xuân Hạnh, Miss Cosmo Vietnam 2023
- Date: December 31, 2023
- Presenters: Đức Bảo; Thanh Thanh Huyền
- Venue: Tea Resort Prenn, Đà Lạt, Lâm Đồng, Vietnam
- Broadcaster: VTV3
- Entrants: 59
- Placements: 16
- Winner: Bùi Thị Xuân Hạnh; Ninh Bình

Miss Cosmo Vietnam 2023 was the sixth edition of the Hoa hậu Hoàn vũ Việt Nam pageant, held at Tea Resort Prenn, Đà Lạt, Lâm Đồng, Vietnam on December 31, 2023. This was also the first Miss Cosmo Vietnam competition held by Công ty Cổ phần Hoàn vũ Sài Gòn (Unicorp) under the name Hoa hậu Hoàn vũ Việt Nam, before being granted to a new national license holder.

Miss Cosmo Vietnam 2022 Nguyễn Thị Ngọc Châu from Tây Ninh crowned Bùi Thị Xuân Hạnh from Ninh Bình as her successor at the end of the event as Miss Cosmo Vietnam 2023. The new Miss Cosmo Vietnam will represent Vietnam at Hoa hậu Hoàn vũ Quốc tế 2024 - (English name: "Miss Cosmo 2024") organized by UNI Media.

== Change ==
- This is the first year that Unicorp will stop cooperating with Uni Media in nominating Vietnamese representatives to attend Miss Universe but will still retain the exclusive rights to the contest brand, Hoa hậu Hoàn vũ Việt Nam. and will still be held.
- On February 18, 2023, Saigon Universe Joint Stock Company (Unicorp) - the organizer of the Miss Universe Vietnam contest announced that it will continue to be the organizer of the Miss Universe Vietnam contest. Nam, at the same time announced the temporary suspension of copyright cooperation in nominating Vietnamese representatives to participate in Miss Universe with the Miss Universe organization.
- Starting from the 2023 season, the audience will vote for "Miss Popular Vote" to put contestants in the Top 16 like the 2022 season, but will contribute these points as an official judge to choose the contestant. win (Unlike the 2022 season, only the contestant with the highest number of votes can be put into the Top 16). At the same time, from the Top 5, only the Top 2 will be announced, and finally the Miss will be announced, meaning the remaining person will be the Runner-up.

== Results ==
=== Placements ===
Color keys

- Declared as the winner in an International pageant.
- Ended as Runner-up in an International pageant.
- Ended as finalist or semifinalist in an International pageant.
- Unplaced.

Placement	Contestant	International pagent	International placement
Miss Cosmo Vietnam 2023	Ninh Bình – Bùi Thị Xuân Hạnh	Miss Cosmo 2024	Top 5
Runner-Up	Hà Nội – Hoàng Thị Nhung		
Top 5	Hồ Chí Minh – Cao Thị Thiên Trang; Hồ Chí Minh – Ngô Bảo Ngọc; Điện Biên – Vũ Thúy Quỳnh		
Top 10	Hồ Chí Minh – Phan Lê Hoàng An; Nghệ An – Đậu Hải Minh Anh; Hà Nội – Kiều Thị Thúy Hằng; Hải Phòng – Phạm Thu Huyền; Bình Phước – Lê Thị Tuyết Nhi §		
Top 16	Hồ Chí Minh – Đặng Trần Ngọc; Hồ Chí Minh – Thomas Iris Thanh; Đắk Lắk – Nguyễn Thị Bích Thùy; Phú Yên – Bùi Thị Thanh Thủy; Nghệ An – Nguyễn Thị Quỳnh Trang; Long An – Huỳnh Đào Diễm Trinh		

§ – Voted into Top 16 by viewers.

=== Special Awards ===
Award	Contestant
Best in National Costume (Miss Aodai)	676 – Hoàng Thị Nhung
Best Smile	684 – Đặng Trần Ngọc
Best Face	696 – Vũ Thúy Quỳnh
Best Catwalk	678 – Ngô Bảo Ngọc
Best Interview	382 – Phan Lê Hoàng An
Miss Popular Vote	696 – Vũ Thúy Quỳnh
Miss Congeniality	181 – Trần Minh Quyên
Miss Talent	080 – Trương Thanh Diễm
Miss Beach	678 – Ngô Bảo Ngọc
Miss Photogenic	686 – Đậu Hải Minh Anh
Miss Sport	188 – Trần Thu Huyền
Best Social Media	789 - Cao Thị Thiên Trang

==== Miss Beach ====
Final result	Contestants
Winner	678 – Ngô Bảo Ngọc
Top 6	382 – Phan Lê Hoàng An; 676 – Hoàng Thị Nhung; 696 – Vũ Thúy Quỳnh; 088 – Nguyễn Thanh Thanh

==== Miss Talent ====
Final result	Contestants
Winner	* 080 – Trương Thanh Diễm
Top 4	375 – Huỳnh Ngọc Lan Anh; 575 – Kiều Thị Thúy Hằng; 288 – Bùi Thị Thanh Thủy
Top 10	382 – Phan Lê Hoàng An; 289 – Trần Thị Thùy Trâm; 686 – Đặng Trần Ngọc; 188 – Trần Thu Huyền; 099 – Đỗ Thị Minh Tâm; 100 – Lê Ngọc Phương Thảo

==== Best Smile ====
Final Results	Contestants
Winner	684 – Đặng Trần Ngọc
Top 10	088 – Nguyễn Thanh Thanh; 181 – Trần Minh Quyên; 696 – Vũ Thúy Quỳnh; 288 – Bùi Thị Thanh Thủy; 292 – Nguyễn Thị Quỳnh Trang; 195 – Nguyễn Thị Thanh Thùy; 678 – Ngô Bảo Ngọc; 789 – Cao Thị Thiên Trang; 578 – Trần Thị Thanh Thanh

==== Miss Fashion ====
Final Results	Contestants
Winner	* 579 – Bùi Thị Xuân Hạnh
Top 10	575 – Kiều Thị Thúy Hằng; 182 – Phạm Thu Huyền; 678 – Ngô Bảo Ngọc; 676 – Hoàng Thị Nhung; 696 – Vũ Thúy Quỳnh; 099 – Đỗ Thị Minh Tâm; 289 – Trần Thị Thùy Trâm; 789 – Cao Thị Thiên Trang; 086 – Huỳnh Đào Diễm Trinh

==== Best Face ====
Final Results	Contestants
Winner	696 – Vũ Thúy Quỳnh
Top 10	090 – Thomas Iris Thanh; 092 – Hồ Nguyễn Ngọc Như; 288 – Bùi Thị Thanh Thủy; 292 – Nguyễn Thị Quỳnh Trang; 181 – Trần Minh Quyên; 684 – Đặng Trần Ngọc; 795 – Đỗ Thị Cẩm Tiên; 686 – Đậu Hải Minh Anh; 578 – Trần Thị Thanh Thanh

==== Best Catwalk ====
Final Results	Contestants
Winner	678 – Ngô Bảo Ngọc
Top 15	185 – Trần Nhật Vy; 088 – Nguyễn Thị Bích Thùy; 797 – Phạm Thị Hằng Nga; 579 – Bùi Thị Xuân Hạnh; 182 – Phạm Thu Huyền; 086 – Huỳnh Đào Diễm Trinh; 575 – Kiều Thị Thúy Hằng; 097 – Nguyễn Thị Lan; 676 – Hoàng Thị Nhung; 181 – Trần Minh Quyên; 099 – Đỗ Thị Minh Tâm; 292 – Nguyễn Thị Quỳnh Trang; 696 – Vũ Thúy Quỳnh; 095 – Đặng Thị Yến

==== Best Interview ====
Final Results	Contestants
Winner	382 – Phan Lê Hoàng An
Top 10	579 – Bùi Thị Xuân Hạnh; 097 – Nguyễn Thị Lan; 676 – Hoàng Thị Nhung; 696 – Vũ Thúy Quỳnh; 684 – Đặng Trần Ngọc; 195 – Nguyễn Thị Thanh Thùy; 793 – Huỳnh Thị Cẩm Tiên; 789 – Cao Thị Thiên Trang; 185 – Trần Nhật Vy

==== Best Body ====
Final Results	Contestants
Winner	289 – Trần Thị Thùy Trâm
Top 10	182 – Phạm Thu Huyền; 797 – Phạm Thị Hằng Nga; 678 – Ngô Bảo Ngọc; 692 – Lê Thị Tuyết Nhi; 181 – Trần Minh Quyên; 696 – Vũ Thúy Quỳnh; 088 – Nguyễn Thanh Thanh; 288 – Bùi Thị Thanh Thủy; 789 – Cao Thị Thiên Trang

==== Miss Purité ====
Final Results	Contestants
Winner	696 – Vũ Thúy Quỳnh
Top 15	382 – Phan Lê Hoàng An; 686 – Đậu Hải Minh Anh; 375 – Huỳnh Ngọc Lan Anh; 579 – Bùi Thị Xuân Hạnh; 188 – Trần Thu Huyền; 080 – Trương Thanh Diễm; 575 – Kiều Thị Thúy Hằng; 692 – Lê Thị Tuyết Nhi; 676 – Hoàng Thị Nhung; 288 – Bùi Thị Thanh Thủy; 289 – Trần Thị Thùy Trâm; 292 – Nguyễn Thị Quỳnh Trang; 195 – Nguyễn Thị Thanh Thùy; 095 – Đặng Thị Yến

== Contestants ==
=== Top 40 semi-finalists and finalists ===
Initially, there were 40 contestants who passed the real traffic challenge, but there were only 38 backup contestants left for the semi-finals tonight because some contestants withdrew from the competition before the semi-final night.

Name of contestants	Year of Birth	No	Height	Hometown	Note
Phan Lê Hoàng An	2000	382	1,69 m	Thành phố Hồ Chí Minh	Win "Cosmo Space"; Best Interview
Đậu Hải Minh Anh	1999	686	1,69 m	Nghệ An	Cosmo Pass - Was featured in the top 59
Huỳnh Ngọc Lan Anh	2001	375	1,73 m	Vĩnh Long	
Trương Thanh Diễm	1994	080	1,70 m	Kiên Giang	Cosmo Pass - Was featured in the top 59
Kiều Thị Thúy Hằng	2000	575	1,77 m	Hà Nội	Cosmo Pass - Was featured in the top 59
Bùi Thị Xuân Hạnh	2001	579	1,72 m	Ninh Bình	Cosmo Pass - Was featured in the top 59; Win "Cosmo Look"
Trần Thị Thu Hiền	2002	799	1,63 m	Đà Nẵng	
Phạm Thu Huyền	1999	182	1,71 m	Hải Phòng	
Trần Thu Huyền	2003	188	1,73 m	Đà Nẵng	
Nguyễn Thị Ngọc Khánh	2003	586	1,63 m	Hà Nội	
Nguyễn Thị Lan	2000	097	1,63 m	Ninh Bình	
Quách Thị Lệ	1999	475	1,69 m	Thanh Hóa	
Lý Thị Linh	2002	488	1,64 m	Lạng Sơn	Withdrawed before the semi-finals due to personal reasons
Phạm Thị Hằng Nga	1999	797	1,71 m	Hà Nam	
Đặng Trần Ngọc	1997	684	1,64 m	Thành phố Hồ Chí Minh	Win "Cosmo Woman"; Best Smile
Ngô Bảo Ngọc	1995	678	1,74 m	Thành phố Hồ Chí Minh	Cosmo Pass - Was featured in the top 59; Best Catwalk
Đặng Tú Nhàn	1998	178	1,72 m	Hà Nội	
Lê Thị Tuyết Nhi	2001	692	1,72 m	Bình Phước	
Hoàng Thị Nhung	1996	676	1,79 m	Hà Nội	Cosmo Pass - Was featured in the top 59
Nguyễn Thị Diễm Quyên	2004	091	1,72 m	Quảng Nam	
Trần Minh Quyên	1994	181	1,70 m	Hà Nội	
Vũ Thúy Quỳnh	1998	696	1,74 m	Điện Biên	Cosmo Pass - Was featured in the top 59; Win "Cosmo Portrait"; Best Face; Miss Purité
Đỗ Thị Minh Tâm	1998	099	1,69 m	Hà Nội	Cosmo Pass - Was featured in the top 59; Withdrawed before the semi-finals due to personal reasons
Nguyễn Thanh Thanh	1999	088	1,68 m	Trà Vinh	
Thomas Iris Thanh	1999	488	1,80 m	Thành phố Hồ Chí Minh	
Trần Thị Thanh Thanh	2002	578	1,70 m	Bắc Giang	
Lê Ngọc Phương Thảo	1995	100	1,75 m	Bến Tre	
Lê Đàm Hồng Thọ	2003	777	1,73 m	Phú Yên	
Nguyễn Thị Bích Thùy	2001	800	1,72 m	Đắk Lắk	
Nguyễn Thị Thanh Thùy	1995	195	1,66 m	Thành phố Hồ Chí Minh	
Bùi Thị Thanh Thủy	1997	288	1,68 m	Phú Yên	Winner Online Contest; Cosmo Pass - Was featured in the top 59
Huỳnh Thị Cẩm Tiên	1993	793	1,66 m	An Giang	
Trần Thị Thùy Trâm	1996	289	1,68 m	Quảng Nam	Best Body
Nguyễn Hoàng Bảo Trân	2001	593	1,70 m	Thành phố Hồ Chí Minh	
Cao Thị Thiên Trang	1993	789	1,76 m	Thành phố Hồ Chí Minh	Cosmo Pass - Was featured in the top 59; Win "Cosmo Pride"; Best Social Media
Triệu Thiên Trang	1998	596	1,67 m	Thành phố Hồ Chí Minh	
Nguyễn Thị Quỳnh Trang	2000	292	1,67 m	Nghệ An	
Huỳnh Đào Diễm Trinh	1998	086	1,77 m	Long An	Cosmo Pass - Was featured in the top 59
Trần Nhật Vy	2002	185	1,70 m	Bình Thuận	
Đặng Thị Yến	2004	095	1,68 m	Kon Tum	

=== Top 59 reality TV contestants ===
Name of contestants	Year of Birth	No	Height	Hometown	Note
Eliminated in episode 2
Nguyễn Thị Hồng Mỹ	2003	592	1,70 m	Đồng Nai	
Hồ Nguyễn Kiều Oanh	2004	581	1,68 m	Vũng Tàu	
Eliminated in episode 3
Lê Thị Yến Ngọc	1994	079	1,69 m	Bến Tre	Withdrawal due to personal reasons
Lê Huỳnh Ni	1998	487	1,70 m	Cà Mau	
Eliminated in episode 5
Hoàng Thị Vân Anh	2001	176	1,67 m	Lạng Sơn	
Đàng Thị Kim Lệ	2000	293	1,63 m	Bình Thuận	
Lê Thị Thanh Ngân	1998	287	1,68 m	Thành phố Hồ Chí Minh	
Nguyễn Thị Thanh Vân	2005	783	1,69 m	An Giang	
Eliminated in episode 6
Phạm Mỹ Duyên	2005	590	1,65 m	Hà Nội	
Bùi Hạnh Nguyên	1997	089	1,80 m	Long An	
Eliminated in episode 7
Lê Thị Ngọc Bích	1996	576	1,70 m	Đà Nẵng	Withdrawal due to personal reasons
Nguyễn Thị Thanh Thủy	1999	591	1,75 m	Đồng Nai	
Võ Thị Thủy Tiên	2001	094	1,70 m	Hà Tĩnh	
Lê Huỳnh Thảo Uyên	1998	077	1,69 m	Thành phố Hồ Chí Minh	
Eliminated in episode 9
Đặng Lâm Giang Anh	1999	175	1,68 m	Đồng Nai	
Lương Thị Trúc Hà	2004	700	1,75 m	Đà Nẵng	
Hồ Nguyễn Ngọc Như	1996	092	1,71 m	Thành phố Hồ Chí Minh	
Đỗ Thị Cẩm Tiên	1997	795	1,64 m	Kiên Giang	
Huỳnh Nguyễn Thanh Trúc	2003	279	1,66 m	Đồng Nai	

== Judges ==
Name	Title, profession	Role
Lê Diệp Linh	Doctor of Anthropometry	Member
Trần Thị Hương Giang	Miss Hải Dương 2006; Miss Grand Slam Asia	Member
Vũ Thu Phương	Supermodel, businessmen	Member
Nguyễn Trần Khánh Vân	Runner-up Supermodel Vietnam 2018; Miss Universe Vietnam 2019	Member
H'Hen Niê	Miss Universe Vietnam 2017	Member
Kathy Uyên	Director, Educator	Member
Quỳnh Hoa	MC, Singer	Member
