= The Face Vietnam =

Vietnamese reality television series

- Logo of The Face Vietnam
- Genre: Competition; Reality show
- Created by: Naomi Campbell
- Showrunners: Đỗ Mạnh Cường (5); Nam Trung (3–4); Hữu Vi (2); Vĩnh Thụy (1)
- Directed by: Lê Thị Quỳnh Trang 3–5; Anh Dương (3); Tùng Jin (1–2); Nguyễn Thị Long An (2); Trịnh Mai Anh (1)
- Starring: Võ Hoàng Yến (3, 5); Anh Thư (4–5); H'Hen Niê (5); Vũ Thu Phương (4); Kỳ Duyên (4); Minh Triệu (4); Minh Hằng (3); Thanh Hằng (3); Hoàng Thùy (2); Minh Tú (2); Lan Khuê (1–2); Hồ Ngọc Hà (1); Phạm Hương (1)
- Opening theme: "Dark Horse" by Katy Perry
- Country of origin: Vietnam
- Original language: Vietnamese
- No. of seasons: 5
- No. of episodes: 53 (present) (list of episodes)

Production
- Running time: 60-180 minutes
- Production companies: Multimedia (3–4); Cát Tiên Sa (1–2)

Original release
- Network: VTV9 (3–4); VTV3 (1–2)
- Release: 18 June 2016 – present

Related
- The Face (U.S.)

The Face Vietnam (Vietnamese: Gương mặt thương hiệu in season 1–2 or Gương mặt Người mẫu Việt Nam in season 3–5) is a Vietnamese modeling–themed reality television series, based on the US television series of the same name, and one of several national editions in the international The Face franchise.

The show is where coaches, often famous models and actors, compete to find "the face" for brands, through modeling and advertising challenges.

In The Face, only the Vietnamese version includes both male and female contestants in the same season, unlike the U.S., U.K., and Australian versions which only feature female contestants, and the Thai version which separates male and female contestants.

== Hosts and mentors ==
Mentors	Seasons				
Mentors	1	2	3	4	5
Lan Khuê	✔				
Hồ Ngọc Hà	✔				
Phạm Hương	✔				
Hoàng Thùy		✔			
Minh Tú		✔			
Võ Hoàng Yến			✔		✔
Minh Hằng			✔		
Thanh Hằng			✔		
Anh Thư				✔	
Vũ Thu Phương				✔	
Nguyễn Cao Kỳ Duyên				✔	
Minh Triệu				✔	
H'Hen Niê					✔
Hosts	Seasons				
Hosts	1	2	3	4	5
Vĩnh Thụy	✔				
Hữu Vi		✔			
Nam Trung			✔		
Đỗ Mạnh Cường					✔

== Seasons ==
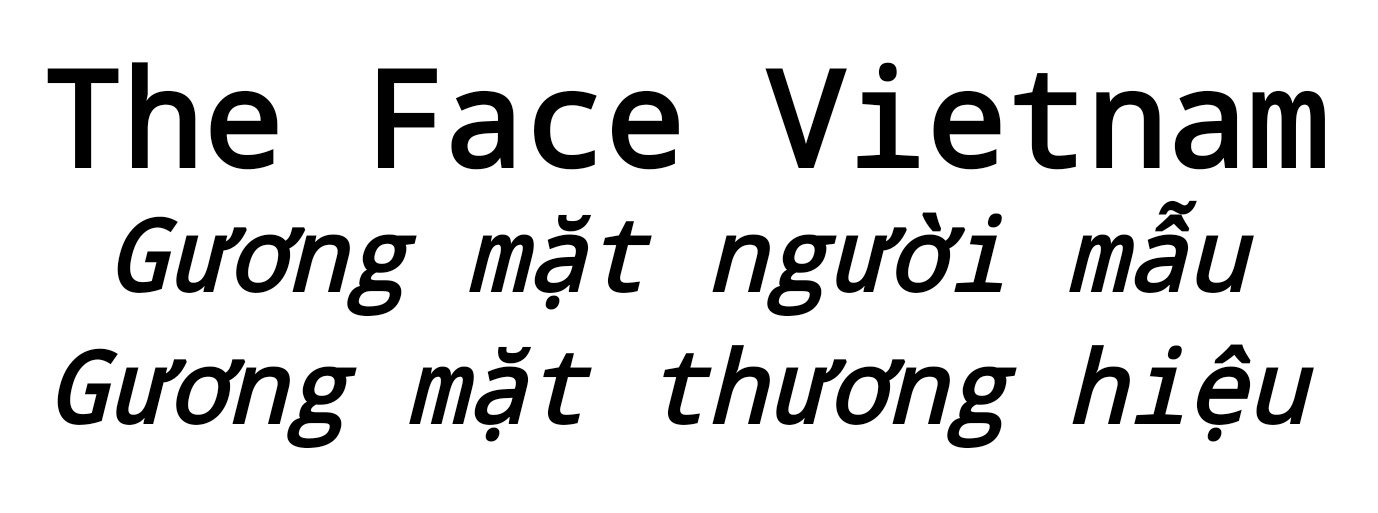
The Face Vietnam reality television series.

Season	Premiere date	Winner	Runners-up	Other contestants in order of elimination	Number of contestants
1	18 June 2016	Phí Phương Anh	Ngô Thị Quỳnh Mai; Đỗ Trần Khánh Ngân; Chúng Huyền Thanh	Nguyễn Thị Thành & Nguyễn Thị My Lê & Tô Uyên Khánh Ngọc, Lê Thị Ngọc Út, Ngụy Thiên An, Nguyễn Thu Hiền, Trần Thị Kim Chi, Diệp Linh Châu, Lilly Nguyễn, Trần Thị Ngọc Loan, Lê Thị Ngân Hà,	15
2	11 June 2017	Nguyễn Bạch Tú Hảo	Trương Mỹ Nhân; Đồng Ánh Quỳnh; Nguyễn Đặng Tường Linh	Nguyễn Thiếu Lan, Nguyễn Đặng Khánh Linh, Trình Thị Mỹ Duyên, Phan Quỳnh Như, Lê Trúc Anh (quit), Nguyễn Thiên Nga, Phan Ngọc Ngân, Đặng Phạm Phương Chi	12
3	30 September 2018	Mạc Trung Kiên	Nguyễn Quỳnh Anh; Lê Thị Trâm Anh	Nguyễn Huy Quang, Brian Trần Đắc Lộc, Nguyễn Xuân Phúc, "Mid" Nguyễn Phạm Minh Đức, Trần Tuyết Như, Hồ Thu Anh, Nguyễn Thị Lệ Nam, Hoàng Như Mỹ, H'Bella H'Đok, Trương Thanh Long, Tôn Thọ Tuấn Kiệt, Bùi Linh Chi	15
4	4 June 2023	Huỳnh Thị Tú Anh	Bùi Thị Xuân Hạnh; Võ Minh Toại; Nguyễn Ngọc Phương Vy	Nguyễn Trần Đức Ân (quit), Nguyễn Hoàng Học, "Vio" Hồ Hải Triều, Hoàng Kim Ngân, Vũ Tuấn Anh, Phạm Thu Huyền, Lương Thùy Dương, Phạm Tuấn Ngọc, Nguyễn Hương Liên, Nguyễn Thị Cẩm Đan, Lâm Hoàng Oanh, Nguyễn Thanh Trâm	16
5	4 October 2026			Lê Thị Giang & Nguyễn Huỳnh Nhựt, Nông Thị Hằng, Nguyễn Trường Giang & Đỗ Hồng Linh, Lãnh Thanh & Trần Ánh Vy, Nguyễn Minh Anh & Mai Bảo Vinh, Vũ Hà An; Still in the running: Nguyễn Nam Hoàng, Phạm Bùi Hương Nguyên, Đỗ Hoàng Sơn, Nguyễn Xuân Thắng, Vũ Quỳnh Hải Yến, Trần Hoàng Sơn, Trần Anh Thư, Ngô Trần Hải Yến	18

Mentor's color symbols

Team Lan Khuê (Season 1–2)
Team Hồ Ngọc Hà (Season 1)
Team Phạm Hương (Season 1)
Team Hoàng Thùy (Season 2)
Team Minh Tú (Season 2)
Team Võ Hoàng Yến (Season 3, 5)
Team Minh Hằng (Season 3)
Team Thanh Hằng (Season 3)
Team Anh Thư (Season 4–5)
Team Thu Phương (Season 4)
Team Kỳ Duyên & Minh Triệu (Season 4)
Team H'Hen Niê (Season 5)
