= The Face Vietnam (season 5) =

- Season 5
- No. of episodes: 10

Release
- Original network: VTV9
- Original release: October 4 – December 19, 2026

Season chronology
- ← Previous; Season 4 Next → Season 6

The Face Vietnam season 5 (Vietnamese: Gương Mặt Người Mẫu) is the fifth season of a Vietnamese modeling-themed reality television series. It is based on the US television series The Face, and part of the international The Face franchise.

After 3-year hiatus, the show returned with supermodel and actress Anh Thư, supermodel Võ Hoàng Yến and Miss Universe Vietnam 2017 H'Hen Niê became mentors, while former Vietnam's Next Top Model judge Đỗ Mạnh Cường served as host. The fifth season premiered on 4 October 2026 on VTV9.

== Contestants ==
(ages stated are at start of filming)

Name	Model coach	Finish	Rank
Lê Thị Giang	Hoàng Yến	Episode 3	18-17
Nguyễn Huỳnh Nhựt	H'Hen Niê	Episode 3	18-17
Nông Thị Hằng	Anh Thư	Episode 4	16
Nguyễn Trường Giang	H'Hen Niê	Episode 5	15-14
Đỗ Hồng Linh	Anh Thư	Episode 5	15-14
Hoàng Văn Thanh (Lãnh Thanh)	Anh Thư	Episode 6	13-12
Trần Ánh Vy	H'Hen Niê	Episode 6	13-12
Nguyễn Minh Anh	Hoàng Yến	Episode 7	11-10
Mai Bảo Vinh	Hoàng Yến	Episode 7	11-10
Vũ Hà An	Hoàng Yến	Episode 8	9
Nguyễn Nam Hoàng	Hoàng Yến		
Phạm Bùi Hương Nguyên	Hoàng Yến		
Đỗ Hoàng Sơn	H'Hen Niê		
Nguyễn Xuân Thắng	H'Hen Niê		
Vũ Quỳnh Hải Yến	H'Hen Niê		
Trần Hoàng Sơn	Anh Thư		
Trần Anh Thư	Anh Thư		
Ngô Trần Hải Yến	Anh Thư		

== Episodes ==
=== Episode 1: The "Clique" Returns: Who Holds the Trump Card? ===
First aired 4 October 2026

"The Face" series extended the range of contestants. Both men and women could become "The Face Vietnam". Contestants faced four challenges: 'Catwalk with personal style', 'Catwalk whilst hiding their faces in a hat', 'Taking a photo showing their true beauty' and 'Video shoot with Canon camera'. After many months of casting in Ho Chi Minh City & Hanoi, 37 semi-finalists have been chosen and they face their final conference runway challenge, which 18 models passed to the pick-team round.

- Team Hoàng Yến: Vũ Hà An, Nguyễn Minh Anh, Lê Thị Giang, Nguyễn Nam Hoàng, Phạm Bùi Hương Nguyên, Mai Bảo Vinh
- Team H'Hen Niê: Nguyễn Trường Giang, Nguyễn Huỳnh Nhựt, Đỗ Hoàng Sơn, Nguyễn Xuân Thắng, Trần Ánh Vy, Vũ Quỳnh Hải Yến
- Team Anh Thư: Nông Thị Hằng, Đỗ Hồng Linh, Trần Hoàng Sơn, Lãnh Thanh, Trần Anh Thư, Ngô Trần Hải Yến
- Special guest: Đỗ Long, Trần Thị Nam Thư

=== Episode 2: The Great Battle Of The Peonies ===
First aired 11 October 2026

- Winning master class: Trần Hoàng Sơn
- Winning coach and team: H'Hen Niê
- Booked for job: Trần Ánh Vy
- Bottom two: Nguyễn Minh Anh & Nông Thị Hằng
- Eliminated: None
- Special guest: Hồ Kim (Saigondance), Milor Trần

=== Episode 3: Iron A Piece Forward A Mile — Where Will The Game Lead? ===
First aired 18 October 2026

- Winning master class: Team Anh Thư
- Winning coach and team: Team Anh Thư
- Booked for job: Trần Anh Thư
- Bottom four: Nguyễn Minh Anh, Lê Thị Giang, Nguyễn Huỳnh Nhựt & Nguyễn Xuân Thắng
- Eliminated: Lê Thị Giang & Nguyễn Huỳnh Nhựt
- Special guest: Đỗ Như Cát Phượng, Celeste Tan

=== Episode 4: Two Tournament Groups — One "Zero" Point? ===
First aired 25 October 2026

- Winning master class: Nguyễn Xuân Thắng & Vũ Hà An
- Winning coach and team: Team Hoàng Yến
- Bottom four: Nông Thị Hằng, Trần Hoàng Sơn, Nguyễn Trường Giang & Vũ Quỳnh Hải Yến
- Eliminated: Nông Thị Hằng
- Special guest: Hoàng Trần Kỳ Duyên, Trần Ngọc, Liêu Hà Trinh, Trương Đình Quốc Huy, Phùng Thị Nhật Lệ

=== Episode 5: The Never-Ending Controversy Over "Earpieces" Used in Denunciation Sessions? ===
First aired 1 November 2026

- Winning master class: Trần Anh Thư
- Winning coach and team: Team Hoàng Yến
- Bottom four: Nguyễn Trường Giang, Nguyễn Xuân Thắng, Đỗ Hồng Linh & Ngô Trần Hải Yến
- Eliminated: Nguyễn Trường Giang & Đỗ Hồng Linh
- Special guest: Cho Sang Bum, Bùi Châu Sang, Dương Tuấn Anh

=== Episode 6 ===
First aired 8 November 2026

- Winning master class:
- Winning coach and team: Team Hoàng Yến
- Bottom four: Lãnh Thanh, Ngô Trần Hải Yến, Đỗ Hoàng Sơn & Trần Ánh Vy
- Eliminated: Lãnh Thanh & Trần Ánh Vy
- Special guest: Nguyễn Trần Khánh Vân, Dương Tuấn Anh, Huỳnh Tú Anh, Tom Trandt, Lê Minh Ngọc, Hoàng Minh Hà, Trần Đạt, Phạm Phạm

== Summaries ==
=== Elimination table ===
Team Hoàng Yến	Team H'Hen Niê	Team Anh Thư

Contestant	Episodes							
Contestant	1	2	3	4	5	6	7	8
Challenge winner	N/A	Sơn T.	Team; Anh Thư	An; Thắng	Thư	Yến V. Hoàng	Thư	Yến V. Thắng
Hoàng	IN	IN	IN	WIN	WIN	WIN	IN	IN
Nguyên	IN	IN	IN	WIN	WIN	WIN	IN	IN
Sơn Đ.	IN	WIN	IN	IN	IMM.	LOW	LOW	IN
Thắng	IN	WIN	LOW	IN	LOW	IN	IN	IN
Yến V.	IN	WIN	IN	LOW	IN	IMM.	LOW	LOW
Sơn T.	IN	IN	WIN	LOW	IN	IN	WIN	WIN
Thư	IN	IN	WIN*	IN	IMM.	IMM.	WIN	WIN*
Yến N.	IN	IN	WIN	IMM.	LOW	LOW	WIN	WIN
An	IN	IMM.	IN	WIN	WIN	WIN	IN	OUT
Anh	IN	LOW	LOW	WIN	WIN	WIN	OUT	
Vinh	IN	IN	IN	WIN	WIN	WIN	OUT	
Vy	IN	WIN*	IN	IMM.	IN	OUT		
Thanh	IN	IMM.	WIN	IMM.	IN	OUT		
Linh	IN	IN	WIN	IN	OUT			
Giang N.	IN	WIN	IN	LOW	OUT			
Hằng	IN	LOW	WIN	OUT				
Giang L.	IN	IN	OUT					
Nhựt	IN	WIN	OUT					

(*) The contestant performed the best overall and booked the job from that client.

The contestant was part of the winning team for the episode.
The contestant was immune from elimination.
The contestant was at risk of elimination.
The contestant was eliminated from the competition.
The contestant was a runner-up.
The contestant won The Face Vietnam 2026.

=== Campaigns ===
- Episode 2: Harness on air photoshoot for Sixdo (Individual & Group)
- Episode 3: TVC for Philips
- Episode 4: Video clip for Dynik & Cindy Bloom
- Episode 5: Video clip for Torriden Skincare
- Episode 6: Space Moon obstacle fashion show
