= Ho Chi Minh City University of Social Sciences and Humanities =

University in Vietnam

Coordinates: 10°47′41.24″N 106°42′10.53″E

VNU-HCM University of Social Sciences and Humanities
- Trường Đại học Khoa học Xã hội và Nhân văn, Đại học Quốc gia Thành phố Hồ Chí Minh
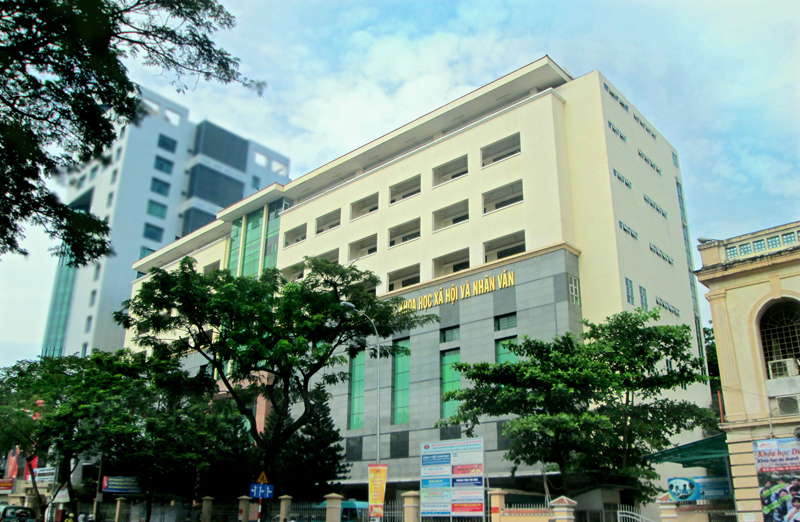
- Type: Public
- Established: 1957; 69 years ago
- Parent institution: Vietnam National University, Ho Chi Minh City
- Rector: Ngô Thị Phương Lan
- Address: 10–12 Đinh Tiên Hoàng, Saigon, Ho Chi Minh City, Vietnam
- Campus: Urban
- Website: www.hcmussh.edu.vn

The Ho Chi Minh City University of Social Sciences and Humanities (HCMUSSH; Vietnamese: Trường Đại học Khoa học Xã hội và Nhân văn, Đại học Quốc gia Thành phố Hồ Chí Minh), or VNU-HCM University of Social Sciences and Humanities, is one of the members of Vietnam National University, Ho Chi Minh City system (VNU-HCM).

It holds the 158th position in the QS University Rankings for Asia (QS 2021). VNU-HCM is also ranked in top 101–150 on QS Top Under 50 (QS 2021), in top 301 - 500 among the 786 higher education institutions from 78 countries by QS GER 2022, in top 601 - 800 on World's Universities for Social Sciences (THE 2022) and in top 193 of the world on the QS Graduate Employability Ranking (QS GER 2022).

HCMUSSH was formerly known as the College of Letters, University of Saigon (Vietnamese: Trường Đại học Văn khoa, Viện Đại học Sài Gòn). It is now the biggest research and training center in the field of social sciences and humanities in Southern Vietnam. In October 2021, HCMUSSH officially claimed their autonomy in the development strategy.

== History ==
The Beginning (1955-1975):

After the 1954 Geneva Accords, the French Preparatory College of Letters, an affiliate member of the University of Saigon, was founded in November 1955, marking the establishment of the university. On 1 March 1957, the College of Letters, University of Saigon was officially established.

After the Vietnam War in October 1975, there were various changes in objectives, curricula and programs under the new socialist government.

The Development into the University of Ho Chi Minh City (1976-1996):

In April 1976, following national reunification, the College of Letters and the College of Science (which is now The University of Science) merged, forming the University of Ho Chi Minh City, which became the biggest training and basic scientific research center in the South of Vietnam. During this period, the former College of Letters functioned as the Faculty of Social Sciences and Humanities within the university.

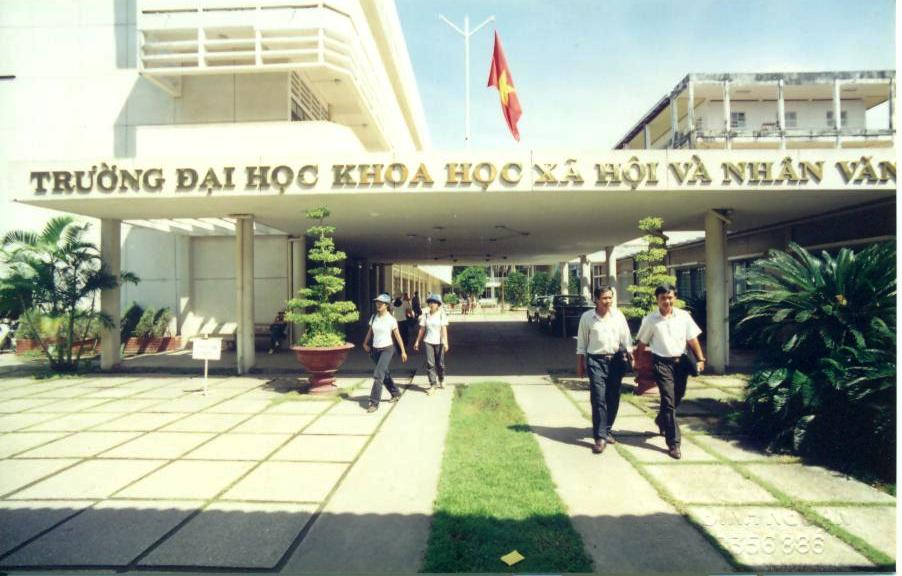

Autonomy (1996-now):

The institution became the social sciences and humanities branch in The University of Ho Chi Minh City from 1976 to 1996. On March 30, 1996, under the Decision No. 1233/QĐ-BGD&ĐT of the Ministry of Education and Training, the College of Letters was separated from The University of Ho Chi Minh City, and was renamed as University of Social Sciences and Humanities.

== Current status ==
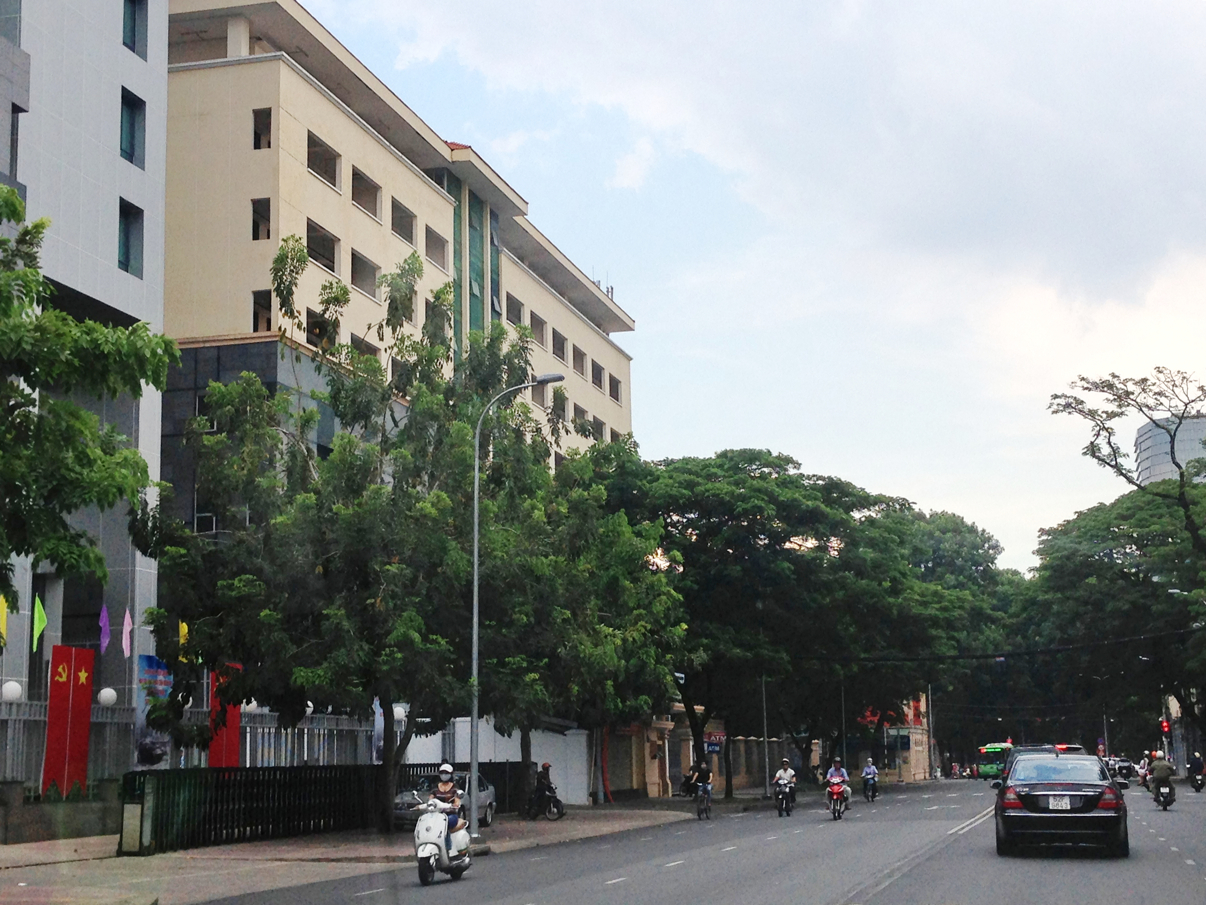

The university has more than 890 faculty members and non-teaching staff. The percentage of the academic staff holding professorial titles or postgraduate degrees is 98.4%. There are more than 22,000 students enrolled in 28 undergraduate programs, 38 postgraduate programs and over 10 joint programs in collaboration with international partners.

the University of Social Sciences and Humanities is regarded as one of the major institutions in the field of social sciences and humanities in Vietnam. The university is the pioneering institution in offering new academic programs to meet societal demands such as Vietnamese Studies, Oriental Studies, Anthropology, International Relations, Urban Studies, Spanish Linguistics and Literature, Italian Linguistics and Literature. In addition, the university is the leading institution nationwide in having over 300 registered international students — from Japan, South Korea, Laos, Cambodia, the United States, Singapore, Austria, Turkey, Thailand, and Australia — in degree programs and over 2,000 students enrolled in short-term courses each year.

The university has about 22,000 undergraduate and postgraduate students in 28 undergraduate programs, 38 postgraduate programs and over 10 joint programs in collaboration with international partners.

== Training ==
As of February 2021, there were 897 officers and lecturers. Amongst the 522 lecturers, there are 44 professors and assistant professors, 211 doctors, 271 masters. Those who have a doctoral degree account for 48% of the total number.

There are hundreds of international lecturers teaching at USSH, VNU - HCM.

== Alumni ==
The university's notable alumni are some of Vietnam's leading politicians:

- Mr. Truong Tan Sang (President of the Socialist Republic of Vietnam, 2011–2016 tenure)
- Ms. Trương Mỹ Hoa (Vice President of the Socialist Republic of Vietnam, 2022–2007 tenure)
- Ms. Đặng Thị Ngọc Thịnh (Vice President of the Socialist Republic of Vietnam, 9/2018–10/2018)
- Ms. Nguyễn Thị Kim Ngân (Chairwoman of the National Assembly of Vietnam, 2016-2021 tenure)
- Mr. Võ Văn Thưởng (Member of the Politburo, Standing member of the Communist Party of Vietnam (CPV) Central Committee's Secretariat, Head of Central Propaganda Department of the CPV, 2016–2021 tenure).

Among the alumni of the university are prominent artists that have made significant contributions for Vietnam Art and Literature:

- Trần Long Ẩn (Musician)
- Vũ Đức Sao Biển (Musician)
- Tôn Thất Lập (Musician)
- Đức Huy (Musician, singer)
- Duong Thuy (Author)
- Hồ Trung Dũng (Singer)
- Hari Won (Singer, Actress)
- Trần Ngọc Lan Khuê (Beauty queen, Model)
- Hoài Anh (Presenter of VTV)
- Trần Tuấn Tài (Presenter of HTV)
- Đinh Ngọc Diệp (Actress)
- Ribi Sachi (Model, Actress)
- Orange (Vietnamese singer).

== See also ==
- List of universities in Vietnam
