= The Face Vietnam season 3 =

The Face Vietnam
- Season 3
- Mentors and Host for The Face Vietnam Season 3
- No. of episodes: 13

Release
- Original network: VTV9
- Original release: September 30 – December 30, 2018

Season chronology
- ← Previous; Season 2 Next → Season 4

The Face Vietnam season 3 (Vietnamese: Gương Mặt Người Mẫu) is the third season of a Vietnamese modeling-themed reality television series. It is based on the US television series The Face, and part of the international The Face franchise.

After two seasons of The Face Vietnam produced by Cat Tien Sa, the show was acquired by Multimedia JSC and was modified from the broadcast channel to the panel of mentors and host. Supermodel Võ Hoàng Yến, singer and actress Minh Hằng, and supermodel Thanh Hằng became mentors, while former Vietnam's Next Top Model judge Nam Trung served as host. The third season premiered on 30 September 2018 on VTV9.

Male and female contestants competed. Team Thanh Hằng's Mạc Trung Kiên won the final round on December 30, 2018.

== Contestants ==
(ages stated are at start of filming)

Name	Age	Model coach	Finish	Rank
Nguyễn Huy Quang	23	Hoàng Yến	Episode 2	15
"Brian" Trần Đắc Lộc	27	Hoàng Yến	Episode 3	14
Nguyễn Xuân Phúc	26	Minh Hằng	Episode 4	13
"Mid" Nguyễn Phạm Minh Đức	28	Thanh Hằng	Episode 5	12
Trần Tuyết Như	23	Hoàng Yến	Episode 6	11
Hồ Thu Anh	22	Thanh Hằng	Episode 8	10
Nguyễn Thị Lệ Nam	22	Thanh Hằng	Episode 9	9
Hoàng Như Mỹ	21	Minh Hằng	Episode 10	8
H'Bella H'Đok	26	Minh Hằng	Episode 11	7
Trương Thanh Long	35	Minh Hằng	Episode 12	6-4
Bùi Linh Chi	22	Thanh Hằng	Episode 12	6-4
Tôn Thọ Tuấn Kiệt	23	Hoàng Yến	Episode 12	6-4
Lê Thị Trâm Anh	23	Minh Hằng	Episode 13	3-2
Nguyễn Quỳnh Anh	19	Hoàng Yến	Episode 13	3-2
Mạc Trung Kiên	21	Thanh Hằng	Episode 13	1

== Episodes ==
=== Episode 1 ===
First aired 30 September 2018

In this casting episode, "The Face" series extended the range of contestants. Both men and women could become "The Face Vietnam". Contestants face two challenges: a 'Catwalk whilst hiding their faces in a hat' and 'taking a group photo showing their true beauty with two or three models'. The four mentors appear in the introduction video. The judges for Vietnam's Next Top Model: Thanh Hằng and show host Nam Trung with new mentor Võ Hoàng Yến. Minh Hằng (replacing Hồ Ngọc Hà after the controversy surrounding her in season 2). After three months of casting, thirty-five models passed to the pick-team round. The mentors' personalities were revealed in the pick-team ring. Hoàng Yến was cast as an evil girl, in contrast to Minh Hang who was sweet. Thanh Hằng seemed to be a calm and decisive leader. Fifteen models entered the model's house.

- Team Võ Hoàng Yến: Brian Trần Đắc Lộc "Brian Trần", Tôn Thọ Tuấn Kiệt, Trần Tuyết Như, Nguyễn Quỳnh Anh, Nguyễn Huy Quang
- Team Thanh Hằng: Mạc Trung Kiên, Bùi Linh Chi, Hồ Thu Anh, Nguyễn Phạm Minh Đức "Mid Nguyễn", Nguyễn Thị Lệ Nam
- Team Minh Hằng: Hoàng Như Mỹ, Trương Thanh Long, Lê Thị Trâm Anh, Bella H'Đơk, Nguyễn Xuân Phúc

=== Episode 2 ===
First aired 14 October 2018

In this episode, the 15 models faced a mini-challenge from host Nam Trung, who have to run to dispute the rooms. Later, they meet Minh Hang at the master class about spoken skills inspired by the speech. Thanh Long was a convincing winner.

- Mentor master class: Minh Hằng
- Winning master class: Trương Thanh Long

The models had to make a video with black-and-white articles of clothing in this challenge's main theme "The Golden Has Returned". Three mentors were in extreme conflict. Mrs. Thiên Hương - who represented Her World magazine, chose team Thanh Hằng. Minh Hằng and Hoàng Yến decided to gamble by putting Thanh Long and Huy Quang, their team's strongest member respectively, up for elimination. This shocked Thanh Hằng because both of them were acquainted with her prior to the show. In the end, Huy Quang had to leave the competition, leading Hoàng Yến to be loud with Thanh Hằng and she declared a war.

- Winning coach and team: Thanh Hằng
- Bottom two: Nguyễn Huy Quang & Trương Thanh Long
- Eliminated: Nguyễn Huy Quang
- Special guest: Trấn Thành, Thanh Duy, Trần Nguyễn Thiên Hương

=== Episode 3 ===
First aired 21 October 2018

14 contestants moved to CITIGYM and they had a lesson in body liberation with music under Hoàng Yến's guidance. They learned 3 dancing styles: Hip-hop, Strong by Zumba, and Sexy dance. Tuyết Như, Xuân Phúc and Mid balanced the score of the teams. Tuấn Kiệt won the final victory for team Hoàng Yến.

- Mentor master class: Võ Hoàng Yến
- Winning master class: Tôn Thọ Tuấn Kiệt

They took part in a promotion video for CITIGYM. Hoàng Yến was defeated with the weakest performance by her contestants. Thảo Quân chose team Minh Hằng to win, while the other two teams showed a disapproving attitude because Thảo Quân used to be the representative for this brand. In the black room, Brian and Trung Kiên landed in the bottom two. Minh Hằng organized a dancing challenge. In the end, she gave Trung Kiên a chance to change in upcoming challenges and eliminated Brian for being the weakest member of Hoàng Yến's team. Hoàng Yến was not unexpected, she would like to change the show into "The Bè Lũ"!

- Winning coach and team: Minh Hằng
- Bottom two: Brian Trần Đắc Lộc & Mạc Trung Kiên
- Eliminated: Brian Trần Đắc Lộc
- Special guest: Jacinda, Nguyễn Thảo Quân

=== Episode 4 ===
First aired 28 October 2018

13 contestants were taken to Vietnam's shopping center - ROBINS. They wore Mix-and-Match with different outfits by mentor Thanh Hằng. At the challenge, one member of each team had to choose a style such as: Street style, Sporty, Office, Rock and Glamour. Only team Hoàng Yến had fewer contestants among three teams, so Hoàng Yến's models would do more than once. Tuyết Như was criticized for her disrespectful attitude by the judges. Xuân Phúc, Như Mỹ and Trung Kiên, Linh Chi added one point for team Minh Hằng and Thanh Hằng. Lệ Nam received the final victory

- Mentor master class: Thanh Hằng
- Winning master class: Nguyễn Thị Lệ Nam "Nam Anh"

Three teams had to take part in a video for MAC Cosmetics on a turning table tagged in a sidestep with the camera hung in the air. The video required them to use their dancing skills, without speaking. After two weeks, Hoàng Yến suddenly won the first victory, before saying she would send Tuyết Như into the elimination room in the upcoming episodes due to her poor attitude. Although they were not the worst members of their teams, Xuân Phúc (who volunteered) and Linh Chi (who did not volunteer) went up for elimination. Hoàng Yến then eliminated Xuân Phúc from the competition.

- Winning coach and team: Võ Hoàng Yến
- Bottom two: Bùi Linh Chi & Nguyễn Xuân Phúc
- Eliminated: Nguyễn Xuân Phúc
- Special guest: Hà Đỗ, Abigail Baniqued, Adam Lâm

=== Episode 5 ===
First aired 4 November 2018

Minh Hằng once again held a master class on acting skills. She taught about eye contact. At this challenge, the models have to pose covering their eyes in an artificial forest. Linh Chi won the challenge.

- Mentor master class: Minh Hằng
- Winning master class: Bùi Linh Chi

12 contestants had to make a video of a Rohto's "Because The Eyes Are Priceless" poster. Team Hoàng Yến won the challenge for a second time in a row. Minh Hằng nominated Như Mỹ for elimination. However, she immediately left the show's studio after learning that Thanh Hằng discovered Như Mỹ went into the elimination room through a main gate from above. This led to Thanh Hằng nominating Mid, much to Linh Chi's dismay, as she felt Trung Kiên deserved to be nominated rather than Mid. In the elimination room, Hoàng Yến gave Mid a chance to stay by telling him to convince Thanh Hằng to rethink and change her nomination. Since Mid denied to do so, he was automatically eliminated, although Hoàng Yến acknowledged that he had potential. After Mid's elimination, Thanh Hằng warned Trung Kiên that if he did not perform better in the upcoming challenges, he would be sent into the elimination room.

- Winning coach and team: Võ Hoàng Yến
- Bottom two: Nguyễn Phạm Minh Đức & Hoàng Như Mỹ
- Eliminated: Nguyễn Phạm Minh Đức

=== Episode 6 ===
First aired: 11 November 2018

- Mentor master class: Võ Hoàng Yến
- Winning master class: Team Minh Hằng
- Winning coach and team: Thanh Hằng
- Bottom two: Trần Tuyết Như & Bella H'Đơk
- Eliminated: Trần Tuyết Như
- Special guest: Trần Uyên Phương

=== Episode 7 ===
First aired 18 November 2018

- Mentor master class: Minh Hằng
- Winning master class: Nguyễn Quỳnh Anh
- Winning coach and team: Minh Hằng
- Bottom two: Tôn Thọ Tuấn Kiệt & Mạc Trung Kiên
- Eliminated: None
- Special guest: Hirofumi Shiramatsu

=== Episode 8 ===
First aired 25 November 2018

- Mentor master class: Thanh Hằng
- Winning master class: Hồ Thu Anh
- Winning coach and team: Minh Hằng
- Bottom two: Tôn Thọ Tuấn Kiệt & Hồ Thu Anh
- Eliminated: Hồ Thu Anh
- Special guest: Gael Hornebeck

=== Episode 9 ===
First aired 2 December 2018

- Mentor master class: Võ Hoàng Yến
- Winning master class: Trương Thanh Long
- Winning coach and team: Võ Hoàng Yến
- Bottom two: Lê Thị Trâm Anh & Nguyễn Thị Lệ Nam
- Eliminated: Nguyễn Thị Lệ Nam
- Special guest: Trần Nguyễn Thiên Hương

=== Episode 10 ===
First aired 9 December 2018

- Winning master class: Team Minh Hằng
- Winning coach and team: Thanh Hằng
- Bottom two: Tôn Thọ Tuấn Kiệt & Hoàng Như Mỹ
- Eliminated: Hoàng Như Mỹ
- Special guest: Kirk McDonald Park

=== Episode 11 ===
First aired 16 December 2018

- Winning master class: Bùi Linh Chi
- Winning coach and team: Võ Hoàng Yến
- Bottom two: Mạc Trung Kiên & Bella H'Đơk
- Eliminated: Bella H'Đơk
- Special guest: Stefan Reicherstorfer, Trần Uyên Phương

=== Episode 12 ===
First aired: 23 December 2018

- Winning master class: Nguyễn Quỳnh Anh
- Winning coach and team: Minh Hằng
- Eliminated: Trương Thanh Long, Tôn Thọ Tuấn Kiệt & Bùi Linh Chi
- Special guest: Trang Lê, Nadav Eschar, Galit Gutman, Doron Lebovich, Keren Naftali

=== Episode 13: Final Walk Live ===
First aired 30 December 2018

- Final three: Nguyễn Quỳnh Anh, Lê Thị Trâm Anh & Mạc Trung Kiên
- Special guests: Trang Lê, Nguyễn Công Trí
- Musical performances: Minh Hằng, Chi Pu
- The Face Vietnam: Mạc Trung Kiên
- Winning coach and team: Thanh Hằng

== Summaries ==
=== Elimination table ===
Team Võ Hoàng Yến	Team Thanh Hằng	Team Minh Hằng

Contestant	Episodes												
Contestant	1	2	3	4	5	6	7	8	9	10	11	12	13
Challenge winner	N/A	Long	Kiệt	Nam	Chi	Anh L.	Anh N.	Anh H.	Long	N/A	Chi	Anh N.	N/A
Kiên	IN	WIN	LOW	IN	IN	WIN	LOW	IN	IN	WIN	LOW	LOW	WINNER
Anh L.	IN	IN	WIN	IN	IN	IN	WIN	WIN	LOW	IN	IN	WIN	RUNNER-UP
Anh N.	IN	IN	IN	WIN	WIN	IN	IN	IN	WIN	IN	WIN	LOW	RUNNER-UP
Kiệt	IN	IN	IN	WIN	WIN	IN	LOW	LOW	WIN	LOW	WIN	OUT	
Chi	IN	WIN	IN	LOW	IN	WIN	IN	IN	IN	WIN	IN	OUT	
Long	IN	LOW	WIN	IN	IN	IN	WIN	WIN	IN	IN	IN	OUT	
Bella	IN	IN	WIN	IN	IN	LOW	WIN	WIN	IN	IN	OUT		
Mỹ	IN	IN	WIN	IN	LOW	IN	WIN	WIN	IN	OUT			
Nam	IN	WIN	IN	IN	IN	WIN	IN	IN	OUT				
Anh H.	IN	WIN	IN	IN	IN	WIN	IN	OUT					
Như	IN	IN	IN	WIN	WIN	OUT							
Đức	IN	WIN	IN	IN	OUT								
Phúc	IN	IN	WIN	OUT									
Brian	IN	IN	OUT										
Quang	IN	OUT											

The contestant was part of the winning team for the episode.
The contestant was at risk of elimination.
The contestant was eliminated from the competition.
The contestant withdrew from the competition.
The contestant was a runner-up.
The contestant won The Face Vietnam 2018.

- In episode 7, team Minh Hằng won the campaign. Võ Hoàng Yến nominated Tuấn Kiệt while Thanh Hằng nominated Trung Kiên for elimination. Minh Hằng did not eliminate either of them.
- In episode 12, team Minh Hằng won the campaign but still can choose only one contestant to send to the Final Walk. Team Minh Hằng's win only means that they will be given the middle position on stage in the Final Walk.

=== Campaigns ===
- Episode 1: Casting.
- Episode 2: One Shot Video Theme: "The Golden Age Has Returned".
- Episode 3: CITYGYM One Shot Video.
- Episode 4: MAC Viral Clip.
- Episode 5: Rohto's "Because The Eyes Are Priceless" Poster.
- Episode 6: Macchiato Milk Tea One Shot Video.
- Episode 7: Rohto's Products Viral Clip.
- Episode 8: ROBINS - Central Group's Brands TVC.
- Episode 9: Herworld's Fashion Video.
- Episode 10: ALMA Resort TVC & Poster.
- Episode 11: Macchiato Milk Tea TVC.
- Episode 12: Israel Viral Clip.
- Episode 13: Final Walk.
