= The Face Vietnam season 2 =

The Face Vietnam
- Season 2
- Promotional poster
- No. of episodes: 12

Release
- Original network: VTV3
- Original release: 11 June – 27 August 2017

Season chronology
- ← Previous; Season 1 Next → Season 3

The Face Vietnam season 2 (Vietnamese: Gương Mặt Thương Hiệu Mùa 2) is a Vietnamese modeling-themed reality television series, based on the US television series of the same name, and one of several national editions in the international The Face franchise. Lan Khuê, Hoàng Thùy and Minh Tú served as model coaches, Hữu Vi served as a host for the second season. The second season premiered on 11 June 2017 on VTV3.

Team Lan Khuê's Nguyễn Bạch Tú Hảo won the final round on 27 August 2017.

== Contestants ==
(ages stated are at start of filming)

Contestant	Age	Model coach	Finish	Rank
Nguyễn Thiếu Lan	20	Hoàng Thùy	Episode 2	12
Nguyễn Đặng Khánh Linh	23	Minh Tú	Episode 3	11
Trình Thị Mỹ Duyên	22	Lan Khuê	Episode 4	10
Phan Quỳnh Như	25	Hoàng Thùy	Episode 6	9
Lê Trúc Anh	21	Minh Tú	Episode 7	8 (quit)
Nguyễn Thị Thiên Nga	23	Minh Tú	Episode 8	7
Phan Ngọc Ngân	22	Lan Khuê	Episode 9	6
Đặng Phạm Phương Chi	23	Hoàng Thùy	Episode 10	5
Nguyễn Đặng Tường Linh	23	Hoàng Thùy	Episode 12	4
Đồng Ánh Quỳnh	22	Minh Tú	Episode 12	3
Trương Mỹ Nhân	22	Lan Khuê	Episode 12	2
Nguyễn Bạch Tú Hảo	22	Lan Khuê	Episode 12	1

== Episodes ==
No. overall	No. in season	Title	Original release date
13	1	"Episode 1"	11 June 2017
The 23 girls chose from the casting online. They will overcome 3 challenges, whom determined a "Gương mặt thương hiệu" for this season. They had a photo shoot with "smiley" theme and a video clip with their original face with dance. And last challenge, they divided into 5 group, they will choose typical locations in Ho Chi Minh City and a OPPO smartphone with slogan "selfie make connections". At pick-up challenge, Lan Khuê still acted as a mentor model. Hoàng Thùy and Minh Tú announced as new mentor role. They selected for their team to 4 members. In addition, Lukkade Matinee also appeared as the model coach for "The Look" and she selected 8 contestants.: Special guest: Phí Phương Anh, Lilly Nguyễn, Lukkade Metinee
14	2	"Episode 2"	18 June 2017
12 girls got in common house after the casting episode. At master class, they had a mix-and-match clothes together with Hoàng Thùy and stylist- Hoàng Ku. Hảo from team Lan Khuê won the challenge. At challenge, they were catwalk and shaping on runway with costumes of Chung Thanh Phong designer. Lan Khuê won the challenge with as a victory mentor. At elimination, Lan and Nga landed in the bottom two. And Lan from team Hoàng Thùy was the first model to leave the competition at placed 12th.

== Summaries ==
=== Elimination table ===
Team Hoàng Thùy	Team Lan Khuê	Team Minh Tú

Contestant	Episodes												
Contestant	1	2	3	4	5	6	7	8	9	10	11	12	
Challenge winner	Như	Hảo	Quỳnh	Như	Nga	Anh	Nga	Ngân	Chi & Ngân	Linh	Hảo	N/A	
Hảo	IN	WIN	WIN	IN	IN	WIN	IN	WIN	IN	LOW	LOW	WINNER	
Nhân	IN	WIN	WIN	IN	OUT							BACK	RUNNER-UP
Quỳnh	IN	IN	IN	WIN	WIN	IN	IN	IN	LOW	WIN	WIN	RUNNER-UP	
T. Linh	IN	IN	IN	IN	IN	IN	WIN	IN	WIN	IN	LOW	RUNNER-UP	
Chi	IN	IN	IN	LOW	LOW	IN	WIN	LOW	WIN	OUT			
Ngân	IN	WIN	WIN	IN	IN	WIN	LOW	WIN	OUT				
Nga	IN	LOW	IN	WIN	WIN	IN	IN	OUT					
Anh	IN	IN	IN	WIN	WIN	LOW	QUIT						
Như	IN	IN	LOW	IN	IN	OUT							
Duyên	IN	WIN	WIN	OUT									
K. Linh	IN	IN	OUT										
Lan	IN	OUT											

The contestant was part of the winning team for the episode.
The contestant was at risk of elimination.
The contestant was eliminated from the competition.
The contestant withdrew from the competition.
The contestant was originally eliminated but returned to the competition.
The contestant was a Runner-Up.
The contestant won The Face.

- Episode 1 was the casting episode. The final twelve were divided into individual teams of four as they were selected.
- In episode 6, Lukkade Metinee replaced Lan Khuê as a mentor during elimination.
- In episode 7, Trúc Anh quit the competition while she was in the bottom two with Phan Ngân before Hoàng Thùy had made her decision.
- In episode 11, team Minh Tú won the campaign. Hoàng Thùy nominated Tường Linh while Lan Khuê nominated Tú Hảo for elimination. Minh Tú decided not to eliminate either of them.
- In episode 12, Mỹ Nhân returned to the competition after winning a popular vote out of the previously eliminated contestants.

=== Campaigns ===
- Episode 1: Shooting with smiley theme, video clip original face and selfie make connections (casting)
- Episode 2: Catwalk and shaping
- Episode 3: Catwalk on gravel
- Episode 4: Acting in music video
- Episode 5: Photography on sailboat and catwalk on the jetty
- Episode 6: Catwalk on the banquet table
- Episode 7: Photography in cold weather
- Episode 8: Roleplay "beauty blogger" for L'Oréal Paris
- Episode 9: Photography selfie color
- Episode 10: Filming of "Nữ Chiến Binh"
- Episode 11: Photography and record TVC TV Ads for LG
- Episode 12: Final Walk
