= The Face Vietnam season 4 =

The Face Vietnam
- Season 4
- No. of episodes: 10

Release
- Original network: VTV9
- Original release: June 4 – August 13, 2023

Season chronology
- ← Previous; Season 3 Next → Season 5

The Face Vietnam season 4 (Vietnamese: Gương Mặt Người Mẫu) is the fourth season of a Vietnamese modeling-themed reality television series. It is based on the US television series The Face, and part of the international The Face franchise.

After 5-year hiatus, the show returned with supermodel Vũ Thu Phương, supermodel and actress Anh Thư, and supermodel Minh Triệu and Miss Vietnam 2014 Kỳ Duyên became mentors, while former Vietnam's Next Top Model judge Nam Trung continue served as host. The fourth season premiered on 4 June 2023 on VTV9.

Team Anh Thư's Huỳnh Thị Tú Anh won the final round on August 13, 2023.

== Contestants ==
(ages stated are at start of filming)

Name	Age	Model coach	Finish	Rank
Nguyễn Trần Đức Ân	20	Anh Thư	Episode 1	16 (quit)
Nguyễn Hoàng Học	26	Kỳ Duyên/Minh Triệu	Episode 3	15
"Vio" Hồ Hải Triều	26	Thu Phương	Episode 4	14
Hoàng Kim Ngân	22	Anh Thư	Episode 5	13
Vũ Tuấn Anh	28	Thu Phương	Episode 6	12
Phạm Thu Huyền	24	Anh Thư	Episode 6	11
Lương Thùy Dương	24	Kỳ Duyên/Minh Triệu	Episode 7	10
Phạm Tuấn Ngọc	24	Kỳ Duyên/Minh Triệu	Episode 8	9
Nguyễn Hương Liên	20	Thu Phương	Episode 9	8
Nguyễn Thị Cẩm Đan	21	Kỳ Duyên/Minh Triệu	Episode 9	7-5
Lâm Hoàng Oanh	19	Thu Phương	Episode 9	7-5
Nguyễn Thanh Trâm	21	Anh Thư	Episode 9	7-5
Bùi Thị Xuân Hạnh	22	Thu Phương	Episode 10	4-2
Võ Minh Toại	24	Anh Thư	Episode 10	4-2
Nguyễn Ngọc Phương Vy	23	Kỳ Duyên/Minh Triệu	Episode 10	4-2
Huỳnh Thị Tú Anh	21	Anh Thư	Episode 10	1

== Episodes ==
=== Episode 1: Beginning the war of the 4 generations ===
First aired 4 June 2023

"The Face" series extended the range of contestants. Both men and women could become "The Face Vietnam". Contestants faced five challenges: 'Catwalk with personal style', 'Catwalk whilst hiding their faces in a hat', 'Taking a photo showing their true beauty', 'Show their talent' and 'Interview with the mentors'. After many months of casting in Ho Chi Minh City & Hanoi, fifteen models passed to the pick-team round.

- Team Anh Thư: Nguyễn Trần Đức Ân, Huỳnh Thị Tú Anh, Phạm Thu Huyền, Nguyễn Thanh Trâm, Võ Minh Toại, Hoàng Kim Ngân
- Team Thu Phương: Bùi Thị Xuân Hạnh, Nguyễn Hương Liên, Lâm Hoàng Oanh, Hồ Hải Triều "Vio", Vũ Tuấn Anh
- Team Kỳ Duyên/Minh Triệu: Phạm Tuấn Ngọc, Nguyễn Hoàng Học, Nguyễn Ngọc Phương Vy, Nguyễn Thị Cẩm Đan, Lương Thùy Dương

Due to health condition, Đức Ân had to withdraw from the competition. As a result, mentor Anh Thư had to pick another contestant for her team and Hoàng Kim Ngân entered the competition. Later, the models entered to their team's apartment.

- Quit: Nguyễn Trần Đức Ân
- Entered: Hoàng Kim Ngân

=== Episode 2: Who is the real chess player? ===
First aired 11 June 2023

In this episode, the 15 models got to see a dance performance from the Fansie Family and dancers, before having a master class from them about choreography dance that they perform earlier. Later, each team had to perform the dance they just learnt and team Anh Thư won.

- Winning master class: Team Anh Thư

The models had to make a commercial video for Viaggio Refreshing Smoothie Cleanser. Johnny Cai & Lê Phương - who represented Viaggio skincare, chose team Thu Phương as the winner and Hương Liên was the best performer overall and she would receive a 6-month contract with Viaggio along with products worth 10.000.000VND. Anh Thư nominated Thu Huyền and Kỳ Duyên/Minh Triệu nominated Cẩm Đan to get into the darkroom for elimination. In the end, Thu Phương eliminated Cẩm Đan for having a childish attitude, which was worse than her potential.

- Winning coach and team: Thu Phương
- Booked for job: Nguyễn Hương Liên
- Bottom two: Nguyễn Thị Cẩm Đan & Phạm Thu Huyền
- Eliminated: Nguyễn Thị Cẩm Đan
- Special guest: Nguyễn Minh Phương & Nguyễn Phúc Thắng (Fansie Family), Johnny Cai, Lê Phương

=== Episode 3: Thousands of pounds hanging on the catwalk ===
First aired 18 June 2023

In this episode, the 14 models had 2 minutes to perform catwalk from the backstage. The mentors of the other teams could bring any challenges and judged their performances. With a total of 14 points, Tuấn Ngọc had the highest scores from the mentors, therefore he won the master class.

- Winning master class: Phạm Tuấn Ngọc

Each team had to send one person to perform a continuous catwalk through five obstacles in five groups. Because team Kỳ Duyên/Minh Triệu was down by one member, one of their models had to perform the challenge twice. Team Anh Thư won the challenge with a total of 100 points, and all 5 members of the team will be walking for Adrian Anh Tuấn's latest fashion show. Although Tuấn Ngọc & Tuấn Anh were mainly considered for elimination, the losing mentors ultimately nominated Hoàng Học & Hoàng Oanh. Anh Thư gave the two nominees a challenge in which they had to change their outfits and performed catwalk once again. After seeing Hoàng Học failed to wear shoes when wearing an oversized fishtail dress, Anh Thư eliminated her from the competition.

- Winning coach and team: Anh Thư
- Booked for job: All members of team Anh Thư
- Bottom two: Nguyễn Hoàng Học & Lâm Hoàng Oanh
- Eliminated: Nguyễn Hoàng Học
- Special guest: Trang Lê, Lê Minh Ngọc, Adrian Anh Tuấn

=== Episode 4: The risky move ===
First aired 25 June 2023

In this episode, each model had to choose for themselves at least three outfits. Only male models were able to coordinate with Elise T-shirts. Teams had 10 minutes to choose the outfits and 30 minutes to shoot a clip following the Transfiguration trend. Each video had a duration of no more than 1 minute 30 seconds, including a scene with the Elise logo and a fixed slogan of the brand. Team Kỳ Duyên/Minh Triệu won the challenge.

- Winning master class: Team Kỳ Duyên/Minh Triệu

Teams experienced the role of representing fashion brand Elise and convincing clients to download the Elise app and experience shopping on the app through an online livestream. Teams could invite anyone (including contestants who were eliminated in previous episodes) to support their team's livestream. Lưu Nga, the founder of Elise, declared Thanh Trâm as the representative of Elise brand. While team Kỳ Duyên/Minh Triệu had their first victory, Minh Toại & Vio were nominated. After a reconcilement between Anh Thư & Kỳ Duyên/Minh Triệu, the latter ultimately eliminated Vio, leading Thu Phương to leave the show's studio in frustration.

- Winning coach and team: Kỳ Duyên/Minh Triệu
- Booked for job: Nguyễn Thanh Trâm
- Bottom two: Võ Minh Toại & Vio Hồ
- Eliminated: Vio Hồ
- Special guest: Thanh Thanh Huyền, Lưu Nga, Phạm Thoại, Trương Nhã Dinh, Long Chun

=== Episode 5: Peace before the storm? ===
First aired 2 July 2023

- Winning master class: Nguyễn Ngọc Phương Vy
- Winning coach and team: Thu Phương
- Booked for job: Bùi Thị Xuân Hạnh & Nguyễn Ngọc Phương Vy
- Bottom two: Hoàng Kim Ngân & Phạm Tuấn Ngọc
- Eliminated: Hoàng Kim Ngân
- Special guest: Annie Quách, Trần Anh Vũ

=== Episode 6: Kisses don't "faded" ===
First aired 9 July 2023

- Winning master class: Huỳnh Thị Tú Anh
- Winning coach and team: Kỳ Duyên/Minh Triệu
- Booked for job: Phạm Tuấn Ngọc & Nguyễn Thanh Trâm
- Bottom four: Vũ Tuấn Anh, Bùi Thị Xuân Hạnh, Phạm Thu Huyền & Võ Minh Toại
- Eliminated: Vũ Tuấn Anh & Phạm Thu Huyền
- Special guest: Phạm Anh Tuấn, Ann Nguyễn

=== Episode 7: "Happy - Angry - Lovely - Sad" ===
First aired 23 July 2023

- Winning master class: Team Kỳ Duyên/Minh Triệu
- Winning coach and team: Thu Phương
- Booked for job: Lâm Hoàng Oanh
- Bottom two: Huỳnh Thị Tú Anh & Lương Thùy Dương
- Eliminated: Lương Thùy Dương
- Special guest: Trần Thị Nam Thư, Liudmila Zueva

=== Episode 8: The Spectacular Comeback ===
First aired 30 July 2023

In this episode, the 7 eliminated models were shot a set of between 5 and 8 photos for a furniture brand named Phố Xinh. After that, they had to present their products and photos by themselves. Cẩm Đan, Tuấn Anh & Kim Ngân were deemed the best performer of each team. Despite being scolded by guest judge Naomi Thủy Nguyễn for failing to control her emotions, Cẩm Đan had the best photo, therefore she won the challenge and returned to the competition.

- Return: Nguyễn Thị Cẩm Đan

The remaining 8 models were filmed a 90-second promotional video for Phố Xinh furniture brand. Each team wrote their own script and cast their roles in the settings and locations, before having 1 hour to film (All three teams were required to do it at the same time). While Tuấn Ngọc & Hương Liên were chosen by the brand, team Anh Thư won the challenge. Tuấn Ngọc, despite having booked for job, was nominated to protect his teammates. Team Thu Phương, on the other hand, nominated Xuân Hạnh because they thought Phương Vy would be in the darkroom. Anh Thư was angered by Tuấn Ngọc's appearance in the darkroom, therefore she called Kỳ Duyên/Minh Triệu. She even forced them to sacrifice one of them if they wanted Tuấn Ngọc to stay. After an intense argument between the three mentors and producer Trang Lê, Anh Thư temporarily spared the nominees and gave the other mentors 10 minutes to reconsider their nominations. Since the mentors did not change their nominees (especially Kỳ Duyên/Minh Triệu did not care), Anh Thư ultimately eliminated Tuấn Ngọc, although she acknowledged that he was a strong contender.

- Winning coach and team: Anh Thư
- Booked for job: Nguyễn Hương Liên & Phạm Tuấn Ngọc
- Bottom two: Bùi Thị Xuân Hạnh & Phạm Tuấn Ngọc
- Eliminated: Phạm Tuấn Ngọc
- Special guest: Dương Quốc Nam, Naomi Thủy Nguyễn

=== Episode 9: The last battle ===
First aired 6 August 2023

- Winning coach and team: Anh Thư
- Booked for job: Huỳnh Thị Tú Anh
- Bottom two: Nguyễn Hương Liên & Nguyễn Ngọc Phương Vy
- First Eliminated: Nguyễn Hương Liên
- Final four was chosen by Coach: Nguyễn Ngọc Phương Vy, Bùi Thị Xuân Hạnh, Huỳnh Thị Tú Anh & Võ Minh Toại
- Second Eliminated: Nguyễn Thị Cẩm Đan, Lâm Hoàng Oanh & Nguyễn Thanh Trâm
- Special guest: Phạm Anh Tuấn, Ann Nguyễn, Niklas Wagner

=== Episode 10: Final Walk - Live ===
First aired 13 August 2023

- Final four: Nguyễn Ngọc Phương Vy, Bùi Thị Xuân Hạnh, Huỳnh Thị Tú Anh & Võ Minh Toại
- The Face Vietnam: Huỳnh Thị Tú Anh
- Winning coach and team: Anh Thư
- Special guests: Lý Giám Tiền, Nguyễn Tiến Truyển, Hà Nhật Tiến
- Musical performances: Double2T, BigDaddy & Emily, DJ Akuti

== Summaries ==
=== Elimination table ===
Team Thu Phương	Team Kỳ Duyên/Minh Triệu	Team Anh Thư

Contestant	Episodes										
Contestant	1	2	3	4	5	6	7	8	9		10
Challenge winner	N/A	Team; Anh Thư	Ngọc	Team; Kỳ Duyên/ Minh Triệu	Vy	Anh H.	Team; Kỳ Duyên/ Minh Triệu	N/A	N/A		N/A
Anh H.	IN	IN	WIN*	IN	IN	IN	LOW	WIN	WIN*	IN	WINNER
Hạnh	IN	WIN	IN	IN	WIN*	LOW	WIN	LOW	IN	IN	RUNNER-UP
Toại	IN	IN	WIN*	LOW	IN	LOW	IN	WIN	WIN	IN	RUNNER-UP
Vy	IN	IN	IN	WIN	IN*	WIN	IN	IN	LOW	IN	RUNNER-UP
Trâm	IN	IN	WIN*	IN*	IN	IN*	IN	WIN	WIN	OUT	
Oanh	IN	WIN	LOW	IN	WIN	IN	WIN*	IN	IN	OUT	
Đan	IN	OUT		JOIN				RET	IN	OUT	
Liên	IN	WIN*	IN	IN	WIN	IN	WIN	IN*	OUT		
Ngọc	IN	IN	IN	WIN	LOW	WIN*	IN	OUT*			
Dương	IN	IN	IN	WIN	IN	WIN	OUT	JOIN			
Anh V.	IN	WIN	IN	IN	WIN	OUT		JOIN			
Huyền	IN	LOW	WIN*	IN	IN	OUT		JOIN			
Ngân	SAVED	IN	WIN*	IN	OUT			JOIN			
Vio	IN	WIN	IN	OUT				JOIN			
Học	IN	IN	OUT	JOIN				JOIN			
Ân	QUIT			JOIN							

(*) The contestant performed the best overall and booked the job from that client.

The contestant was part of the winning team for the episode.
The contestant was at risk of elimination.
The contestant was eliminated from the competition.
The contestant withdrew from the competition.
The contestant was originally eliminated, but was saved.
The contestant was originally eliminated but was returned to the competition on their original team for winning the Comeback challenge.
The contestant was originally eliminated but returned to the competition as guest in Campaign.
The contestant was a runner-up.
The contestant won The Face Vietnam 2023.

- In episode 1, after 15 contestants were chosen from the 4 mentors, Đức Ân from team Anh Thư had to withdraw due to health issues. As a result, Anh Thư was asked to pick a new member and Kim Ngân was chosen to compete.
- In episode 6, there was a double elimination. The mentors of the two losing teams had to nominate two people from their team for elimination.
- In episode 8, guest judge Naomi Thủy Nguyễn chose Cẩm Đan to return to the competition for performing the best in the Comeback challenge.
- In episode 9, there were two separate eliminations. The first elimination was usual, in which the mentor of the winning team had to eliminate a member from the other team. The second one required each mentor(s) to eliminate one person in their team.

=== Campaigns ===
- Episode 2: Viral Clip for Viaggio Refreshing Smoothie Cleanser
- Episode 3: Continuous Catwalk
- Episode 4: Live Streaming for Elise Fashion
- Episode 5: TVC swinging in the chandelier for Label.m
- Episode 6: Viral Clip hanging upside down for MAC Cosmetics
- Episode 7: One-shot TVC for Philips
- Episode 8: TVC for Pho Xinh
- Episode 9: Photoshoot and TVC for MAC Cosmetics
- Episode 10: Final Walk
