= The Face Vietnam season 1 =

The Face Vietnam
- Season 1
- Promotional poster
- No. of episodes: 12

Release
- Original network: VTV3
- Original release: 18 June – 3 September 2016

Season chronology
- Next → Season 2

The Face Vietnam season 1 (Vietnamese: Gương Mặt Thương Hiệu Mùa 1) is a Vietnamese modeling-themed reality television series, based on the US television series of the same name, and one of several national editions in the international The Face franchise. Hồ Ngọc Hà, Phạm Hương and Lan Khuê served as model coaches and Vĩnh Thụy served as a host for the first season. The first season premiered on 18 June 2016 on VTV3.

Team Hồ Ngọc Hà's Phí Phương Anh won the final round on September 3, 2016.

== Contestants ==
(Ages stated are at start of filming)

Contestant	Age	Model coach	Finish	Rank
Tô Uyên Khánh Ngọc	25	Hồ Ngọc Hà	Episode 2	15-13
Nguyễn Thị Thành	20	Phạm Hương	Episode 2	15-13
Nguyễn Thị My Lê	26	Lan Khuê	Episode 2	15-13
"Bảo Ngọc" Lê Thị Ngọc Út	22	Lan Khuê	Episode 3	12
"An Nguy" Ngụy Thiên An	29	Phạm Hương	Episode 5	11
Nguyễn Thu Hiền	22	Lan Khuê	Episode 5	10
Trần Thị Kim Chi	24	Lan Khuê	Episode 6	9
Diệp Linh Châu	22	Phạm Hương	Episode 7	8
Lilly Nguyễn	23	Hồ Ngọc Hà	Episode 8	7
Trần Thị Ngọc Loan	23	Phạm Hương	Episode 9	6
"Lê Hà" Lê Thị Ngân Hà	23	Hồ Ngọc Hà	Episode 11	5
Chúng Huyền Thanh	19	Hồ Ngọc Hà	Episode 12	4
Đỗ Trần Khánh Ngân	22	Phạm Hương	Episode 12	3
"Mai Ngô" Ngô Thị Quỳnh Mai	21	Lan Khuê	Episode 12	2
Phí Phương Anh	19	Hồ Ngọc Hà	Episode 12	1

== Episodes ==
=== Episode 1 ===
First aired 18 June 2016

- Team Hồ Ngọc Hà : Tô Uyên Khánh Ngọc, Phí Phương Anh, Chúng Huyền Thanh, Lê Thị Ngân Hà “Lê Hà”, Lilly Nguyễn.
- Team Phạm Hương : Đỗ Trần Khánh Ngân, Diệp Linh Châu, Trần Thị Ngọc Loan, Nguỵ Thiên An “An Nguy”, Nguyễn Thị Thành.
- Team Lan Khuê : Ngô Thị Quỳnh Mai “Mai Ngô”, Lê Thị Ngọc Út “Bảo Ngọc”, Trần Thị Kim Chi, Nguyễn Thu Hiền, Nguyễn Thị My Lê.
- Special guest: Tóc Tiên

=== Episode 2 ===
First aired 25 June 2016

- Team Hồ Ngọc Hà : Phí Phương Anh, Chúng Huyền Thanh, Lê Thị Ngân Hà “Lê Hà”, Lilly Nguyễn.
- Team Phạm Hương : Đỗ Trần Khánh Ngân, Diệp Linh Châu, Trần Thị Ngọc Loan, Nguỵ Thiên An “An Nguy”.
- Team Lan Khuê : Ngô Thị Quỳnh Mai “Mai Ngô”, Lê Thị Ngọc Út “Bảo Ngọc”, Trần Thị Kim Chi, Nguyễn Thu Hiền.
- Eliminated: Tô Uyên Khánh Ngọc, Nguyễn Thị Thành & Nguyễn Thị My Lê

=== Episode 3 ===
First aired 2 July 2016

- Winning coach and team: Phạm Hương
- Bottom two: Lê Thị Ngọc Út “Bảo Ngọc” & Chúng Huyền Thanh
- Eliminated: Lê Thị Ngọc Út “Bảo Ngọc”
- Special guest: Mai Phương Thúy

=== Episode 4 ===
First aired 9 July 2016

- Winning coach and team: Hồ Ngọc Hà
- Bottom two: Nguỵ Thiên An “An Nguy” & Ngô Thị Quỳnh Mai “Mai Ngô”
- Eliminated: Nguỵ Thiên An “An Nguy”
- Special guest: Jay L Lingeswara

=== Episode 5 ===
First aired 16 July 2016

- Winning coach and team: Phạm Hương
- Bottom two: Lilly Nguyễn & Nguyễn Thu Hiền
- Eliminated: Nguyễn Thu Hiền
- Special guest: Thụy Vi, Trần Ngọc Nhật, Richard Mehr, Thoại Yến, Anh Thư, Nguyễn Bích Trâm, Quân Ngọc, Lê Minh Ngọc, Nhật Bình, Nguyễn Danh Quý, MLee, Chung Thanh Phong, Travis Nguyễn, Kelbin Lei, Nguyễn Thanh Hưởng, Hensi Lê, Tuấn Trần, Yến Trang, Yến Nhi, Nguyễn Vũ Sơn, ST, Khánh My, Thu Thủy, Hà Thanh Huy, Hùng Lâm, Trác Thúy Miêu, Trương Ngọc Tình, Phúc Nguyễn, Ngọc Phú, Đoàn Tùng

=== Episode 6 ===
First aired 23 July 2016

- Winning coach and team: Phạm Hương
- Bottom two: Lê Thị Ngân Hà “Lê Hà” & Trần Thị Kim Chi
- Eliminated: Trần Thị Kim Chi
- Special guest: Nguyễn Ngọc Thụy, Tạ Nguyên Phúc, Christian Mark Jacobs, Châu Đăng Khoa, Nguyễn Tuấn Kiệt, Huỳnh Anh, Hoàng Oanh, Hương Tràm, Trương Minh Cường, Thu Hoài, Trịnh Thăng Bình, Tân Thế Giới, Vân Shi, Diệu Hân, Trà Linh, Yamanouchi Masatoshi, Theron Thanh, Tuấn Trấn, Trương Quỳnh Anh, Diệu Huyền, Randy G.Dobson, Anh Thư, Minh Trung, Nathan Lee, Hoàng Ngân, Khánh Vy, Đại Ngô, Lê Thanh Hoà, Diệu Ngọc

=== Episode 7 ===
First aired 30 July 2016

- Winning coach and team: Lan Khuê
- Bottom two: Phí Phương Anh & Diệp Linh Châu
- Eliminated: Diệp Linh Châu
- Special guest: Tóc Tiên, Trường Huỳnh Diễm Chi

=== Episode 8 ===
First aired 6 August 2016

- Winning coach and team: Lan Khuê
- Bottom two: Lilly Nguyễn & Trần Thị Ngọc Loan
- Eliminated: Lilly Nguyễn
- Special guest: Nguyễn Văn Sơn

=== Episode 9 ===
First aired 13 August 2016

- Winning coach and team: Hồ Ngọc Hà
- Bottom two: Trần Thị Ngọc Loan & Ngô Thị Quỳnh Mai “Mai Ngô”
- Eliminated: Trần Thị Ngọc Loan
- Special guest: Tóc Tiên, BTV Minh Quang, BTV Lê Phát, PV Vân An, PV Quang Phong, PV Quỳnh Trang, PV Phương Giang

=== Episode 10 ===
First aired 20 August 2016

- Winning coach and team: Phạm Hương
- Bottom two: Ngô Thị Quỳnh Mai “Mai Ngô” & Chúng Huyền Thanh
- Eliminated: Ngô Thị Quỳnh Mai “Mai Ngô”
- Eliminated coach: Lan Khuê
- Special guest: John Cook

=== Episode 11 ===
First aired 27 August 2016

- Winning coach and team: Hồ Ngọc Hà
- Bottom three: Đỗ Trần Khánh Ngân, Chúng Huyền Thanh & Lê Thị Ngân Hà “Lê Hà”
- Eliminated: Lê Thị Ngân Hà “Lê Hà”
- Special guest: ST, Tóc Tiên, Noo Phước Thịnh

=== Episode 12 ===
First aired 3 September 2016

- Winning coach and team: Hồ Ngọc Hà
- Returned: Ngô Thị Quỳnh Mai “Mai Ngô”
- Final four: Phí Phương Anh, Chúng Huyền Thanh, Đỗ Trần Khánh Ngân & Ngô Thị Quỳnh Mai “Mai Ngô”
- The Face Vietnam 2016: Phí Phương Anh
- Special guest: S-Girls, Nguyễn Văn Sơn, Lưu Hương Giang, Tóc Tiên, Sơn Tùng M-TP

== Summaries ==
=== Elimination table ===
Team Hồ Ngọc Hà	Team Phạm Hương	Team Lan Khuê

Contestant	Episodes											
Contestant	1	2	3	4	5	6	7	8	9	10	11	12
Challenge winner	Thanh C.	—N/a	Châu	Mai	Hiền	Ngân	Mai	—N/a	Anh	Anh	Ngân	N/A
Anh	IN	IN	IN	WIN	IN	IN	LOW	IN	WIN	IN	WIN	WINNER
Mai	IN	IN	IN	LOW	IN	IN	WIN	WIN	LOW	OUT		RUNNER-UP
Ngân	IN	IN	WIN	IN	WIN	WIN	IN	IN	IN	WIN	LOW	RUNNER-UP
Thanh C.	IN	IN	LOW	WIN	IN	IN	IN	IN	WIN	LOW	WIN	RUNNER-UP
Hà	IN	IN	IN	WIN	IN	LOW	IN	IN	WIN	IN	OUT	
Loan	IN	IN	WIN	IN	WIN	WIN	IN	LOW	OUT			
Lilly	IN	IN	IN	WIN	LOW	IN	IN	OUT				
Châu	IN	IN	WIN	IN	WIN	WIN	OUT					
Chi	IN	IN	IN	IN	IN	OUT						
Hiền	IN	IN	IN	IN	OUT							
An	IN	IN	WIN	OUT								
Út	IN	IN	OUT									
Lê	IN	OUT										
Thành N.	IN	OUT										
Ngọc	IN	OUT										

The contestant was part of the winning team for the episode.
The contestant was at risk of elimination.
The contestant was eliminated from the competition.
The contestant was a runner-up.
The contestant won The Face.

- Episode 1 was the casting episode. The final fifteen were divided into teams of five as they were selected.
- In episode 2, Hồ Ngọc Hà, Phạm Hương and Lan Khuê were asked to choose any one contestant to eliminate from their team. Hồ Ngọc Hà chose Khánh Ngọc, Phạm Hương chose Nguyễn Thị Thành, and Lan Khuê chose My Lê.
- In episode 4, team Hồ Ngọc Hà won the campaign. Lan Khuê nominated Quỳnh Mai while Phạm Hương nominated Thiên An for elimination. The episode ended in a cliffhanger and their fate remained unknown until the beginning of episode 5.
- In episode 11, team Hồ Ngọc Hà won the campaign. Hồ Ngọc Hà nominated Lê Hà and Huyền Thanh for elimination with Khánh Ngân, and chose to eliminate Lê Hà.
- In episode 12, Quỳnh Mai returned to the competition after winning a popular vote out of the previously eliminated contestants.

=== Campaigns ===
- Episode 1: Natural beauty and street style (casting)
- Episode 2: Catwalk for swimsuits and dress by Chung Thanh Phong designer (casting)
- Episode 3: Apollo silicone commercial shoot
- Episode 4: VietJet campaign
- Episode 5: Runway party table
- Episode 6: Bridal runway show
- Episode 7: Gender reversal for L'Oréal Paris
- Episode 8: TVC filming with male models
- Episode 9: Press conference for OPPO
- Episode 10: Apolo Silicone TVC filming
- Episode 11: OPPO TVC filming
- Episode 12: Final walk
