= Anh Thư =

Vietnamese famous actor and model

Vietnam's photogenic queen Anh Thư Supermodel of Vietnam
- Nguyễn Thị Anh Thư
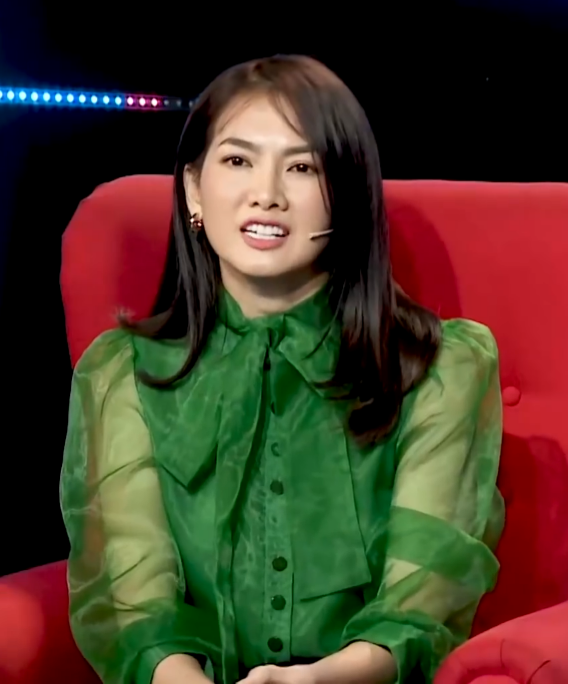
- Anh Thư in 2020
- Born: Nguyễn Thị Anh Thư; April 26, 1982 (age 44); Hồ Chí Minh City, Vietnam
- Other name: Ma mười (Note: Originated from the horror film Muoi: The Legend of a Portrait)
- Education: Nguyễn Hiền High School
- Occupation: Model • Actor
- Years active: 1999–present
- Known for: The role of Thủy in the movie Những cô gái chân dài
- Spouse: Trần Thanh Long (m. 2004–2016)
- Children: Trần Tiểu Long (born 2007)
- Awards: Golden Apricot Award 2004 for Actress in Film and Television; Best model by Golden Rose Award 2006
- Modeling information
- Height: 1.72 m (5 ft 8 in)
- Hair color: Black
- Eye color: Brown
- Agency: Professional Look (2003–present); Việt Model Company (Closed)
- Beauty pageant titleholder
- Major competitions: Miss Vietnam 2000 (Top 22); Miss Vietnam Photogenic 2001 (Top 10)

Anh Thư

Vietnamese name
- Vietnamese: Anh Thư
- Chữ Hán: 英姐
- Literal meaning: heroine

Nguyễn Thị Anh Thư (born April 26, 1982) is a Vietnamese fashion model and actor. She was one of the public icons of in the 2000s and was dubbed "The First Vedette of the 2000s". She is the first model in Vietnam to successfully build the image of a versatile model.

Her career is described as "glorious" with many outstanding achievements in both fields. In 2013, she began to gradually reduce her activities to take care of her family. It was not until 2022 that she returned to the stage with new roles.

== Career ==
=== The pinnacle of career ===
She started her career while still in high school. In 2000, she won the runner-up prize of Miss Nguyễn Hiền High School. In the same year, the school sent her to participate in the Giọt mực tím dễ thương (Cute purple ink drops) organized by the City Youth Union and the Youth Cultural House and won the "Giọt mực tím dễ thương thứ ba" prize (i.e. the second Runner-up) and the Miss Hazeline award from the sponsor, becoming the representative face of Hazeline.

After that, she participated in Miss Vietnam 2000 organized by Tiền Phong newspaper and reached the top 22.

Anh Thư first ventured into acting when director Hồ Ngọc Xum invited her to star in his TV series "Sương gió biên thùy" (2002), which received a nomination in the Golden Kite category for TV dramas in 2002.

In 2002, modeling in Vietnam was still new and prejudiced, not yet recognized as a profession by the Ministry of Culture and was only considered a supporting role in art programs, such as Charming Vietnam Gala, Huế Festival, Anh Thư became the first Vietnamese female model and the second model in history to appear in a national television commercial (TVC) officially when she was chosen as the main advertising model for Ajinomoto and then became an ambassador for many other brands and programs. Even before that, in 1999, she and Ngô Thanh Vân co-starred in a TVC for the campaign to launch the Sirius line of motorbikes in the Vietnamese market of the Yamaha brand, but at that time, Thanh Vân was working as a singer and had not yet worked as a model, so she was the first model to be recorded in a nationally televised commercial. By 2003, Anh Thư continued to participate in advertising campaigns and TVCs for Acecook and Enchanteur. Her influence along with other big names in the fashion industry such as designers Minh Hạnh, Sỹ Hoàng, Đức Hùng, ... models Trương Ngọc Ánh, Vũ Cẩm Nhung, Ngô Mỹ Uyên, Ngọc Thúy, ... created conditions for the establishment of official catwalks dedicated to models, such as: Vietnam Fashion Week, Fashion and Life, Fashion and Passion, Đẹp Fashion Show.

After 3 years of successful activities and making her mark as a pioneering commercial model in the modeling industry, along with the formation of mainstream fashion shows, Anh Thư began to focus on developing a high fashion career. She appeared more and more on major domestic shows, and reached her peak when she took on the lead role in the movie "Long-legged Girls" (2004).

On November 7, 2004, Long-Legged Girls won the Silver Lotus Award at the 14th Vietnam Film Festival, which was also the first time a film by a private company participated in the Vietnam Film Festival and won an award. A resounding commercial success, the film became a milestone that brought Anh Thư's name to the spotlight, recognized as the most successful and highest-paid model of the 2000s. She appeared frequently in many famous major magazines such as Cinema Theater, Marketing and Family, Fine Arts, Beauty, Women's World, Women's World, Sports World and Men. (Note: In Vietnamese: Điện ảnh Kịch trường, Tiếp thị và Gia đình, Mỹ thuật, Đẹp, Thế giới Phụ nữ, Thế giới Thanh nữ, Thế giới Thể thao và Đàn ông.)

On January 29, 2005, Anh Thư won Golden Apricot Award 2004 for Actress in Film and Television, becoming the first Vietnamese female model in history to be honored at a national film award. Her success consolidated and created an influence on the movement of models acting in films later on, followed by faces such as Bằng Lăng, Ngô Thanh Vân, Trương Ngọc Ánh, Thanh Hằng, Trang Trần. Two days later, at the Model of the Year awards ceremony organized by Thanh Niên Fashion Club, she received two awards for best model and most favorite model voted by fashion enthusiasts and audiences nationwide, bringing her a hat-trick of awards with the fastest record of being awarded, in just 3 days, until it was broken by singer Mỹ Tâm with 3 consecutive music awards at the 2011 Green Wawe Awards, however, as a female model and actress in particular, she is still the only one holding this record until now.

During the golden age of her career, Anh Thư's image was not only covered in newspapers, magazines, and fashion shows, but also on banners, advertising campaigns, and major TVCs at that time. She was a pioneer in opening the era of exclusive advertising between models and brands that developed strongly in Vietnam. She was often considered one of the iconic fashion models invited to appear in the first generation of advertisements. Anh Thư works as a brand ambassador for all three famous cosmetics and skin care brands belonging to the multinational Unilever system: Pond's, Lux, Sunsilk, participating in Lux's cross-Southeast Asia trade promotion advertising campaign with Thai supermodel Marsha Vadhanapanich, and is also the representative face for Pepsi, Anlene, Yamaha, Ajinomoto,... Her family's model management company, Professional Look, is also the agency with the largest number of exclusive models in the country, leading in the number of exclusive contracts at that time.

After the "Long-legged Girls", Anh Thư accepted the invitation to star alongside actor Bình Minh in the short film called "Nửa phía bên kia" by veteran director Le Hoàng Hoa. The completed film is considered the premise for his favorite project, "The Ghost of Hui Family Returns", a follow-up to the success of the hit film "The Ghost of Hui Family" (1973) from decades ago. He died while the project was still in its gestation stage.

In 2006, the Golden Rose Awards were held to honor the achievements of young women in the fields of culture and arts including literature, cinema, theater, music and fashion. Anh Thư won the Best Model category. In the same year, she starred in two works: the movie Truong Ba's Soul, Butcher's Skin (2006) by Nguyễn Quang Dũng and the TV series Tropical Snow (2006) by Vũ Ngọc Đãng. Rooted in a muddy, stagnant land and exploited in the direction of idol dramas with the main inspiration of fairy tales of love in everyday life, "Tropical Snow" has attracted many audiences from young to old and has become one of the small screen fever phenomena in 2006, bringing M&T Pictures a Silver Kite in the category of long-running dramas organized by the Vietnam Cinema Association VCA for the 5th time. At the same time, Anh Thư received two nominations in the category of film and television actress of the year at the Mai Vang Awards and the category of most favorite leading actress at the HTV Awards. Having worked closely with the director of the film "Mouse" (Chuột) through two famous films recognized by the academic community, Anh Thư is often called the first muse of Vũ Ngọc Đãng.

In 2007, Anh Thư returned to the big screen with the classic "Muoi: The Legend of a Portrait", co-starring with Bình Minh and Hồng Ánh. This was the first horror film in Vietnam after 1975, and was the first shot that opened the horror film movement in Vietnam later on. In the film, she played the female ghost Muoi, a haunting image that made her known as one of the most typical female horror ghosts of Vietnamese cinema at that time. In 2008, she starred in "Bird of Paradise" after a period of absence from the small screen, the film won the 7th Silver Kite Award.

=== Reduce activities ===
At the peak of her career, she gradually reduced her activities to take care of her family. During her ten years of absence, a new name appeared and became the second "Vietnam's photogenic queen" Thanh Hằng.

In 2017, Anh Thư made a return to the stage with 10 closing shows and a guest role in "Tháng năm rực rỡ" by director Nguyễn Quang Dũng. Despite creating a strong impact on the public and being sought after at the time of its premiere, she did not choose to continue her career.

In 2021, she participated in the movie "Sám hối". Then she was a judge of Miss Grand Vietnam 2022. In 2023, she participated in the movie "Flower King" of VieOn, she caused a surprise effect when participating in the movie "Muoi: The Curse Returns", during this time she appeared continuously on fashion shows. She was a coach at the program The Face Vietnam with Vũ Thu Phương, Kỳ Duyên and Minh Triệu, in final walk her contestant Huỳnh Tú Anh winner.

== List of roles ==
=== Movies ===
Year	Movie		Role	Note
Year	In Vietnamese	In English	Role	Note
2004	Những cô gái chân dài	The Long-Legged Girls	Thủy	
2006	Hồn Trương Ba, da hàng thịt	Trương Ba's Soul, Butcher's Body	Thị	
2007	Mười: Truyền thuyết về bức chân dung	Muoi: The Legend of a Portrait	Mười	
2010	Em hiền như ma sơ	You are as gentle as a nun	Sơ/Sir	
2013	Những thiên thần nhanh nhạy	The Angels Are Quick	Anh Thư	Guest
2018	Tháng năm rực rỡ	—N/a	Tuyết Anh	Guest
2021	Sám hối	—N/a	Thủy	
2021	Mười: Lời nguyền trở lại	Muoi: The Curse Returns	Mười	
TBA	Giã từ cô đơn	—N/a	TBA	TBA

=== TV series ===
Year	Movie		Role	Note
Year	In Vietnamese	In English	Role	Note
2002	Sương gió biên thùy	—N/a	Trâm	
2006	Tuyết nhiệt đới	Tropical Snow	Hằng	
2008	Hoa thiên điểu	—N/a	Nhã Lan	
2009	Có lẽ nào ta yêu nhau	—N/a	Ẩn Lan	
2010	Lối sống sai lầm	—N/a	Hiền	
2010	Dòng sông huynh đệ	—N/a	Trang	
2011	Anh và em	—N/a	Kim Anh	
2011	Dây leo hạnh phúc	—N/a	Ánh Băng	
2012	Chữ T danh vọng	The letter T of fame	Phương Thuý	
2013	Yêu đến tận cùng	—N/a	Hà An	
2013	Nữ xế	—N/a	Châu	
2014	Lồng son	—N/a	Mai	
2014	Khi người đàn ông trở lại	—N/a	Vy Nguyễn	
2015	Hạnh phúc bất tận	Endless happiness	Thục Uyên	
2016	Bốn cuộc tình một người đàn ông	—N/a	Huyền Anh/Ngà	
2016	Truy tìm hung thủ	—N/a	Minh Nguyệt	
2016	Sống để chuộc lỗi (Bông trang đỏ)	—N/a	Chi Mai	
2016	Biệt thự trắng	Orphanage Murder	Quỳnh Như	
2016	Vạch trần tội ác	—N/a	Minh Anh	
2016	Chạy án 3: Đặc biệt nguy hiểm	—N/a	Minh Thuý	
2016	Một thời ngang dọc	A horizontal and vertical time	Mộc Lâm	
2017	Nhà có hai cửa chính	—N/a	An Nhiên	
2017	Tình kỹ nữ	—N/a	Chi Mai	
2017	Gió vẫn thổi từ biển	—N/a	Phương	
2017	Dạo chơi giữa Sài Gòn	—N/a	Cẩm Nhung	
2018	Tơ duyên	—N/a	Designer Ngọc	
2023	Hoa vương	Flower King	Anh Thư	

=== Music video ===
Year	MV	Singer
2002	Đi tìm tình yêu	Diễm Liên ft D&D
2004	Nhan sắc	Minh Thư
2004	Giấc mơ Aikia	Viết Thanh
2004	Thật thà cho một tình yêu	Hồ Ngọc Hà ft Viết Thanh
2004	Tình lỡ cách xa	Mỹ Tâm
2004	Tình cuối mây ngàn	Quang Dũng
2004	Về đi thôi hỡi em	Đàm Vĩnh Hưng
2005	Xin lỗi tình yêu	Đàm Vĩnh Hưng ft Mỹ Tâm ft Hồng Ngọc
2022	Cô đơn trên sofa	Hồ Ngọc Hà

=== Programme ===
Year	Title (in Vietnamese/English)	Ep.	Role	TV
2008	Phong cách và Đam mê/Style and Passion	All Ep.	Guest	HTV9
2015	Người bí ẩn	Ep. 11	Guest	HTV7
2016	Làng hài mở hội/The comedy village opens a festival	Ep. 08	Judger	THVL
2017	Ơn giới, câu đây rồi!	Ep. 12	Guest	VTV3
2018	Sáng Phương Nam/South Sun	All Ep.	Guest	VTV9
2019	Siêu nhân mẹ/My Mon is Super	Ep. 03	Guest	VTV3
2019	Ô hay gì thế này/TBA	Ep. 07	Guest	VTV3
2019	Người ấy là ai	Ep. 08	Guest	HTV2
2019	Giác quan thứ 6/TBA	Ep. 12	Guest	VTV3
2019	7 nụ cười xuân	Ep. 16	Guest	HTV7
2019	Giọng ải giọng ai	Ep. 16	Guest	HTV7
2019	Khẩu vị ngôi sao/TBA	Ep. 21	Guest	HTV7
2019	Ký ức vui vẻ	Ep. 08	Guest	VTV3
2019	Quý ông đại chiến/TBA	Ep. 02	Guest	VTV3
2020	9 người 10 ý/TBA	Ep. 06	Guest	THVL
2020	Showbiz secret	#167	Guest	HTV9
2023	The Face Vietnam	All Ep.	Mentor	VTV9

=== Judger/Contestant ===
Color keys

- : Judger
- : Contestant

Year	Title
1999	Cute purple ink drops
2000	Miss Vietnam
2001	Miss Vietnam Photogenic
2009	Teen Model
2010	Vietnam Model Star
2012	Teen Star 2012
2013	Elegant Men 2013
2014	Vietnam Model Star
2016	Đồng Nai province Elegant Student Contest
2016	The Face Vietnam
2017	Promising Face of Cinema and Theatre
2018	Vietnam Star of Fame 2018
2019	Miss Đồng Nai Tourism 2019
2022	Miss Grand Vietnam

== Achievements ==
Awards and nominations by Anh Thư
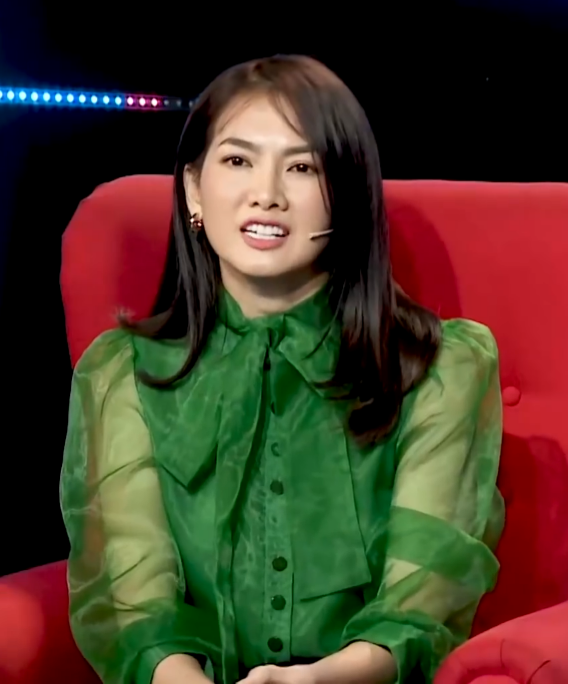
- Anh Thư
Awards and nominations
Award	Win	Nomination
Total
Cute purple ink drops	2	0
Miss Vietnam	0	Top 22
Miss Vietnam Photogenic	0	Top 10
Model of the Year Award	2	0
Golden Apricot Award	2	1
HTV Awards	0	1
Vietnam Film Festival	1	0
Asian Model Awards	1	0
Won	8
Nominated	4

Year	Prize	Category	Nominated works	Result	Note
2000	Cute purple ink drop	Cute purple ink drop	Anh Thư	2nd Runner-up	
2000	Cute purple ink drop	Miss Hazazaline	Anh Thư	Won	
2000	Miss Vietnam	Miss Vietnam	Anh Thư	Top 22	
2012	Universal Dance	Bronze Award	Anh Thư	Won	
2001	Miss Vietnam Photogenic	Miss Vietnam Photogenic	Anh Thư	Top 10	
2001	Miss Vietnam Photogenic	Miss Civic White 2001	Anh Thư	Won	
2001	Miss Vietnam Photogenic	The most popular beauty	Anh Thư	Won	
2004	Golden Apricot Award	Film–television actress	The Long-Legged girls	Won	
2004	Model of the Year Award	The most popular model	Anh Thư	Won	
2004	Model of the Year Award	Best model	Anh Thư	Won	
2006	Golden Rose Award 2006	Best model	Anh Thư	Won	
2006	Golden Apricot Award	Film–television actress	Tropical Snow	Nominated	
2006	HTV Awards	Best Actress	Tropical Snow	Nominated	
2010	Asian Model Awards	Vietnam Model Star	Anh Thư	Won	
2023	Golden Apricot Award	Film–television actress	Flower King	Nominated	

== Read more ==
- "Biography of Model Anh Thu". Thông tin Người nổi tiếng (in Vietnamese). No. Hồ Chí Minh City, Vietnam. 2017-03-16. Archived from the original on 2024-06-18.
- Phạm Ngọc Thạch Medical College; MPod (2021-06-25). "Tóm tắt tiểu sử ngắn gọn của người mẫu diễn viên Anh Thư" [Brief biography of model and actress Anh Thu]. MPod (in Vietnamese). No. Hồ Chí Minh City, Vietnam: June 25, 2021. Archived from the original on 2025-04-27.
