= Nguyễn Thị Ngọc Châu =

Vietnamese model and beauty pageant titleholder (born 1994)

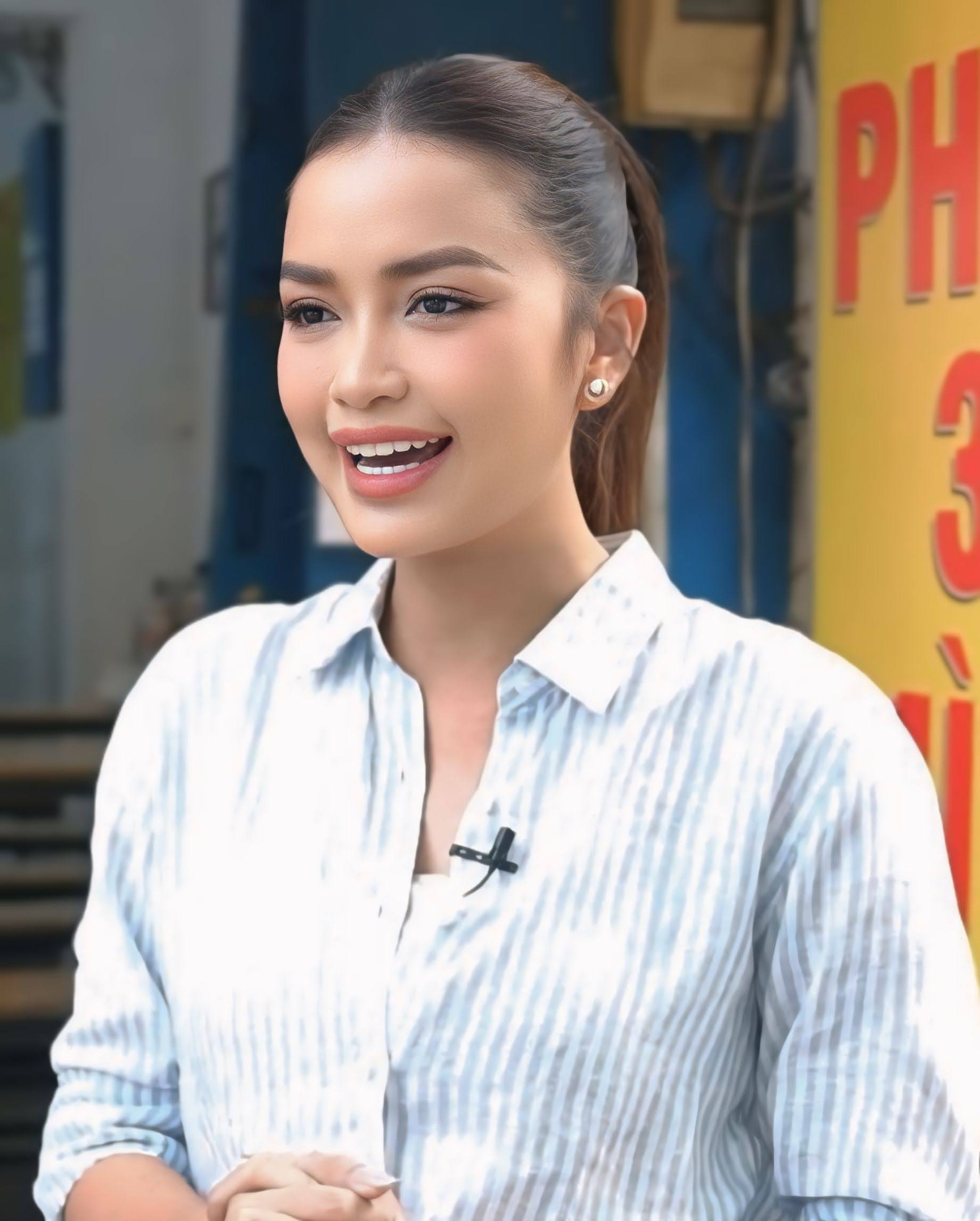
- Châu in 2024
- Born: Nguyễn Thị Ngọc Châu; December 6, 1994 (age 31); Tây Ninh, Vietnam
- Education: Ton Duc Thang University
- Beauty pageant titleholder
- Title: Miss Supranational Vietnam 2018; Miss Supranational Asia 2019; Miss Universe Vietnam 2022
- Major competitions: Miss Supranational Vietnam 2018; (Winner); Miss Supranational 2019; (Top 10); (Miss Supranational Asia); Miss Universe Vietnam 2022; (Winner); Miss Universe 2022; (Unplaced)

Nguyễn Thị Ngọc Châu (born December 6, 1994) is a Vietnamese model, and beauty pageant titleholder who won Miss Universe Vietnam 2022. She represented Vietnam in Miss Universe 2022, and was unplaced.

Châu won Miss Supranational Vietnam 2018 and Vietnam's Next Top Model 2016. She represented Vietnam at Miss Supranational 2019 pageant and reached the top 10.

== Early life ==
Nguyễn Thị Ngọc Châu was born on December 6, 1994 in Tây Ninh province, Vietnam. She studied Biotechnology at Ton Duc Thang University.

== Television ==
Châu won the seventh season of Vietnam's Next Top Model in 2016.

== Pageantry ==
Châu won Miss Supranational Vietnam 2018 at the Walker Hill Theater in Seoul, South Korea. She went on to represent Vietnam at Miss Supranational 2019, and reached the top 10. She also won the Miss Supranational Asia award. On June 25, 2022, Châu won Miss Universe Vietnam 2022, held at the Saigon Exhibition and Convention Center in Ho Chi Minh City. She represented Vietnam at Miss Universe 2022, and was unplaced. After the competition, she won the Swimsuit Cape Vote.

Awards and achievements
Preceded by Nguyễn Thị Hương Ly	Vietnam's Next Top Model; 2016	Succeeded by Lê Thị Kim Dung
Preceded by First	Hoa hậu Siêu quốc gia Việt Nam; 2018	Succeeded by Võ Cao Kỳ Duyên
Preceded by Nguyễn Huỳnh Kim Duyên	Miss Universe Vietnam; 2022	Succeeded by Bùi Quỳnh Hoa
Preceded by Nguyễn Trần Khánh Vân	Miss Cosmo Vietnam; 2022	Succeeded by Bùi Thị Xuân Hạnh
Preceded by Nguyễn Minh Tú, Vietnam	Miss Supranational Asia; 2019	Succeeded by Jihane Almira Chedid, Indonesia
Preceded by Nguyễn Minh Tú	Miss Supranational Vietnam; 2019	Succeeded by Nguyễn Huỳnh Kim Duyên
Preceded by First	Miss Universe Swimsuit Cape Vote; 2022	Succeeded by Incumbent
Preceded by Katia Mekhi Lobos, El Salvador	Miss Elegance Supranational 1st Runner Up; 2019	Succeeded by Dindi Pajares, Philippines
