= The Ghost of Hui Family =

1973 film by Lê Hoàng Hoa

- Directed by: Lê Hoàng Hoa; Bùi Nhật Quang
- Screenplay by: Nguyễn Thành Châu; Nguyễn Phương
- Based on: Play The Shadow of Lady Hui by Nguyễn Thành Châu
- Produced by: Diệp Nam Thắng
- Starring: Bạch Tuyết; Thanh Tú; Ba Vân; Dũng Thanh Lâm; Năm Châu
- Cinematography: Nguyễn Văn Để; Đường Tuấn Ba
- Music by: Nguyễn Minh Trí
- Production company: Dạ Lý Hương Films
- Distributed by: Vietnam National Institute of Film; Lê Quang Thanh Tâm
- Release date: 1973
- Running time: 90 minutes
- Country: Republic of Vietnam
- Language: Vietnamese

The Ghost of Hui Family (Vietnamese: Con ma nhà họ Hứa, Chinese: 許家女鬼) is a 1972 Vietnamese 35mm black and white film directed by Lê Hoàng Hoa.

== Plot ==
The film is based on a tale about a wealthy family in Saigon. It was the first horror film made in Vietnam.

== Background ==
In the early 1970s, many managers of cailuong theater chains were forced to shut due to the financial pressure that foreign language films put them under. The Dạ Lý Hương Theatre was able to avoid the crash and, in a gamble to save the troupe, and inspired by the successes of MGM's 1959 film Ben-Hur, tycoon Xuân (bầu Xuân) founded Dạ Lý Hương Films and employed filmmaker Lê Hoàng Hoa.

Screenplayer Nguyễn Thành Châu named the movie The Ghost of Uncle Hoa's Family, which was based on a tale involving the family of Jean-Baptist Hui Bon Hoa. However, Hui Bon Hoa's descendants sued the studio and forced them to change the name to The Ghost of Hui Family. It was filmed in Thủ Đức, Biên Hòa and Da Lat in 1972, and was the only product of Dạ Lý Hương company.

The final scene was filmed in the real private cemetery of the Hui Bon Hoa family with the permission of the family.

== Production ==
- Studio : Dạ Lý Hương Films (Dạ-Lí-Hương Điện-ảnh Công-ti)
- Print : National Cinema Centre (Trung-tâm Quốc-gia Điện-ảnh)
- Sound : Nghiêm Xuân Trường, Lê Văn Kính

== Cast ==
- Bạch Tuyết... Thúy Hồng
- Thanh Tú
- Dũng Thanh Lâm
- Tư Rọm
- Bà Năm Sa Đéc
- Ba Vân
- Nguyễn Thành Châu
- Tâm Phan
- Khả Năng
- Thanh Việt
- Minh Ngọc
- Tùng Lâm
- Thy Mai

== In popular culture ==
The film title Con ma nhà họ Hứa has become a conversational phrase that means the "disappointed one", because the word Hứa means "promise" in Vietnamese language.

== See also ==
- Saigon Museum of Fine Arts
- Gerhard Armauer Hansen
- The Canterville Ghost
