= Trần Ngọc Lan Khuê =

Vietnamese model (born 1992)

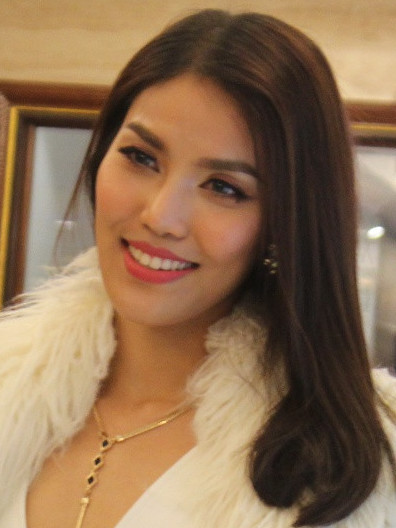
- Lan Khuê in 2016
- Born: Ho Chi Minh City, Vietnam
- Education: Ho Chi Minh City University of Social Sciences and Humanities
- Occupations: Model, actress, businesswoman
- Height: 1.76 m (5 ft 9 in)
- Spouse: John Tuấn Nguyễn (m. 2018)
- Beauty pageant titleholder
- Title: Golden award – Vietnam Supermodel 2013; Miss Aodai Vietnam 2014
- Years active: 2012–present
- Major competitions: Miss Aodai Vietnam 2014 (Winner); Miss World 2015 (Top 11)
- Website: elitemodel.vn

Trần Ngọc Lan Khuê is a Vietnamese model and beauty pageant titleholder. Lan Khuê won the gold award at Vietnam supermodel 2013. In 2014, she won Miss Aodai Vietnam (the previous name of Miss World Vietnam). Then represented Vietnam at Miss World 2015 and reached the top 11. She then became one of the mentors in the reality show The Face Vietnam. Lan Khuê is the CEO of Elite Model Management, Elite Vietnam in Ho Chi Minh City, and the managing editor of L'Officiel Vietnam.

== Early life ==
Trần Ngọc Lan Khuê was born in Ho Chi Minh City. Her family has an academic background, both of her parents are professors in Ho Chi Minh City Pedagogical University. Her grandfather, the late Professor Tran Thanh Dam, was the first chairman of Ho Chi Minh City University of Education.

After graduating from high school, Lan Khue was accepted into Ho Chi Minh City University of Social Sciences and Humanities, and majored in German language and Literature.

Lan Khuê is married to John Tuan Nguyen.

== Career ==
In 2011 Lan Khuê's first modelling event was Vietnam Supermodel 2011, but she fell in the casting round and was unable to continue the in contest.

In 2012, Lan Khuê entered and won the most potential model award at Vietnam Supermodel 2012, held in Hanoi. She then competed in Asian Supermodel contest 2012, in Nanning, China and was second runner-up, she also won the Photogenic Model award. She participated in the New Silk Road Model Look contest in Clark, Philippines. She was placed first runner-up in the final, the winner was from Miss China, and the second runner-up was from Miss Thailand.

On 20 October 2013, she won Vietnam Supermodel 2013.

Early 2014, she was cast by film director Trương Quang Thịnh to play a singer named Trang Nhi in movie Handsome Sơn, which aired in early 2015.

In September, Khuê won Miss Aodai Vietnam 2014, as was eligible to represent Vietnam at Miss World 2015. Where on 5 January 2015, she won the Confidently Shining award.

Lan Khuê represented Vietnam and reached the top 11 at Miss World 2015 in Sanya, China. She also won the People's Choice award.

Lan Khuê was master of ceremonies for Vietnam Supermodel 2015.

On 23 April, Lan Khuê was announced as one of three mentors of The Face Vietnam 2016 which is hosted by - Vĩnh Thụy, Mister International 2009. On 15 November, Khuê became CEO of Elite Model Management in Hồ Chí Minh City, Vietnam.

On 17 April, the three mentors of The Face Vietnam (season 2) were announced including Lan Khuê. After 12 episodes, the Final Walk took place on 27 August and the winner was Tú Hảo her team member.

In 2019, Lan Khuê became a judge of the first Miss Charm pageant and crowned the winner.

On 16 January 2023, Universe Vietnam Trading Joint Stock Company began operation from Hanoi headed by Mrs. Nguyen Thi Thuy Nga, with Lan Khue as the southern regional director of Miss Universe Vietnam.

She was appointed Managing Editor of L'Officiel Vietnam in May 2025.

== Judge ==
Year	Competition/Show	Position	Note	Source
2016	The Face Vietnam (season 1)	Mentor	Team Chameleon Warriors	
2016	Cười Xuyên Việt	Guest judge	Episode 10	
2016	Dance Your FAT Off season 2	Guest judge	Episode 3, 9	
2016	So you Think you can dance: Vietnam 2016	Guest judge	Show 8	
2016	Người đẹp xứ Dừa 2016	Judge	–	
2017	Elle Beauty award	Judge	–	
2017	Sparktacular season 2	Judge	Singapore	
2017	The Face Vietnam (season 2)	Mentor	Team LanKhue – winning team	
2017	Muscle Contest	Judge for catalogue of Model	Leep Asia	
2017	Miss Ocean Vietnam	Judge	–	
2017	The Look Vietnam	Guest judge	–	
2018	Vietnam Supermodel 2018	Host	–	
2018	The Bachelor Vietnam	Judges	Casting round	
2018	The Look Vietnam	Judges	Casting round	
2018	Yan Music award	Judge	–	
2019	Miss Charm Vietnam	Master judges	–	
2023	Miss Charm 2023	Judges	–	
2023	The New Menter	Judges	–	
2023	Miss Universe Vietnam 2023	Judges	-	

=== Competitions and pageants ===
Year	Competition/Pageant	Placement	Note
2012	Vietnam Supermodel 2012	Top 16	Awards: Most Potential Model.
2012	Asian Supermodel 2012	2nd Runner-up	The competition took place in China. She won Photogenic Award.
2013	New Silkroad Model Look	1st Runner-up	The competition took place in the Philippines.
2013	Vietnam Supermodel 2013	Gold Prize	She reached the highest rank in the contest.
2015	Miss Aodai Vietnam 2014	Won	She won Confidently Shining Award.
2015	Miss World 2015	Top 11	She won World Designer, People's Choice awards.

=== Master of Ceremony ===
Year	Event	Channel	Note	Ref
2015	Thay lời muốn nói	HTV9	Lead the event with MC Quỳnh Hương	
2015	Sinh viên vì biển đảo	–	Lead the event with Trần Long	
2015	Vietnam Super model contest	VTV3	Lead the event with Anh Quan and Phuong Mai	
2016	Live broadcast on Lunar new year eve	ANTV	–	
2016	Dep 360	YanTV	partnership between YanTV and L'Oreal	

== Filmography ==
=== Movies ===
Year	Title	Role	Note	Ref
2015	Handsome Son (Sơn Đẹp Trai)	Trang Nhi (singer)	female lead	
2017	Mother in law (me chong)	Tư Thì	second female lead	

=== Television series ===
Year	Title	Channel	Role	Note	Ref
2013	Tiệm Bánh Hoàng Tử Bé	VTV9	herself	Episode 235 – trying to be a model	

=== Short film ===
Year	Short film	Competition	Role	Note	Ref
2018	Đền – một ước mơ	321action	big boss	gold award-winning short film	

Awards and achievements
Preceded by Nguyễn Thị Loan	Miss World Vietnam; 2015	Succeeded by Trương Thị Diệu Ngọc
Preceded by First Edition	Miss Aodai Vietnam; 2014	Succeeded by Trương Thị Diệu Ngọc
Preceded by (Thailand) Nonthawan Thongleng	Miss World - People Choice Award; 2015	Succeeded by (Mongolia) Bayartsetseg Altangerel
