= Minh Hằng =

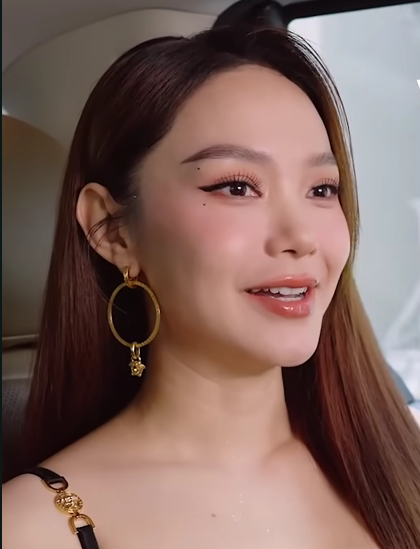

Background information
- Born: Lê Ngọc Minh Hằng; June 22, 1987 (age 39); Ho Chi Minh City, Vietnam
- Genre: Pop
- Occupations: Singer-songwriter, actress, dancer, model
- Instrument: Vocals
- Years active: 2003–present
- Label: Contest

Lê Ngọc Minh Hằng (born June 22, 1987, in Ho Chi Minh City) better known as Minh Hằng, is a Vietnamese singer, actress and model.

Lê Ngọc Minh Hằng stepped into her career at the age of 16 as a member of several girlgroups, and has been cast in several dramas but failed to make much of a mark. In 2007, after the success of the film Gọi Giấc Mơ Về (Calling The Dream), Minh Hang's name began to attract a lot of attention and interest. With successive successes in music and film projects, she was considered one of the most promising faces of Vietnamese entertainment at the time.

In 2009 and 2011, Lê Ngọc Minh Hằng was voted "Favorite Actress of the Year" by HTV Awards. She has released a music album for Hanco Food, Casio and Cyberworld, a game company.

In 2011, she officially departed from Thien Thi Entertainment and started embarking her career as a solo singer. Her career began to bloom as the audiences name her "Queen of Commercial" for being the face of many brands. In 2018, she becomes a coach of The Face Vietnam 2018 alongside Thanh Hang and Vo Hoang Yen. At the same time, she is the producer of her first movie ever named Mùa Viết Tình Ca (Season of Love Songs).

== Early life ==
Lê Ngọc Minh Hằng was born in Ho Chi Minh City. She has a younger brother named Lê Ngọc Minh Hải. At age 13, her parents divorced, she and her brother came to live with her mother in Bình Thạnh district.

It was said that her music career started from "Dreams within reach of the hands" music class of Ho Chi Minh City Culture House of Youth where famous musicians will primarily give short term vocal training course, dance lesson and basic how-to form a music band. She registered and luckily got enrolled.

In 2003, she and three other girls together established a girl group named Pha Lê (Crystal) causing her busy for being responsible of show order and costume shopping,... During this time, she won the first prize of Nữ Sinh Thanh Lịch (Graceful Student) competition held by her then high school, also became a model of some local magazines.

After quite a time performing, the Pha Lê girlgroup did not gain much attention. One year later, she departed from the group to join another girl group named Tiamo that often performed at music shows in the city. Despite certain recognition, the group did not reach their expectation. While participating and performing at Culture House of Children of District 4, she accidentally knew that Giai Phong Films was casting for the movie Gió Thiên Đường (Heaven Breeze), she submitted her portfolio and later invited to the audition. After rehearsing one line of the script, director Lam Le Dung immediately cast her for the starring role of the movie.

Her role in Gió Thiên Đường garnered much attention despite not having proper training in acting. In 2005, she signed a two-year contract with Lasta Entertainment, following the contract deal that she would be Lasta's exclusive actress that made sure to make an appearance in 80 episodes per year.

=== Music career continuation ===
In 2007, she began working with Thiên Thi Entertainment as her contract with Lasta Entertainment had ended previously. She claimed to stop acting temporarily so she could have time to focus on music instead. To make her teen idol, a big campaign was put out to promote a modern, innocent-looking, active and sexy idol for her.

In 2008, she debuted first album titled Một Vòng Trái Đất which later became a hit as a variety of teenage audiences widely loved it, especially on the Internet. The debut album consisted of ten songs and most of them were composed by songwriter Nhat Trung, the album release set a record on sale as to be the highest sale of all times in Vietnam music industry. In October 2008, she held first ever national wide live show, starting from Middle Regions to North Regions such as: Nghe An, Thanh Hoa, Nam Dinh, Hai Phong, Ha Noi,... Singer Duy Khanh, rapper Young Uno and ABC dance group were guests in her live show.

=== The success of "Dream Calling" ===
Despite acting in numerous TV dramas such as: Mộng Phù Du, Vì Đó Là em, Cái Bóng Bên Chồng, Gọi Giấc Mơ Về (Calling The Dream) was the most favorite TV drama by the audience, it received big attention from them as well. She starred as Phụng, a high school girl who owns weird personality living a simple life, has a golden heart as well. In order to make a good appearance of the character, she had to gain 9 kg of weight, as the film ended, she was on diet to stay in shape again. For this role, she won Favorite Actress of The Year award from HTV Awards 2008 with 17,000 votes via phones.

After focusing on music, in 2008, she was invited to be the leading role of the movie Giải Cứu Thần Chết (Rescuing the God of Death) (the sequel of Nụ Hôn Thần Chết (Kiss of the God of Death), this was a romance comedy film which was released in Lunar New Year of 2009. The movie's revenue was 14 billion Vietnam Dong after 15 days since the release.

In 2009, director Vu Ngoc Dang was in charged of remaking the successful Korean drama titled "Full House". The cast included many famous artists from various fields. In the drama, Minh Hang starred as Minh Minh, Luong Manh Hai as Vuong Hoang – leading male role of the drama. Beside, there were many guests such as singer Lam Truong (as Dinh Phong), singer Thuy Tien (as Bao Yen), actress Tang Thanh Ha,...The remake started filming in May 2009 with 26 episodes, however it was cut shorter later with only 23 episodes instead.

== Albums and prizes ==
- Một vòng trái đất (2008)
- Cô nàng đáng yêu (2010)
- Giờ em đã biết (2014)
- Yolo – You only live once (2015)
- 2008: got HTV Award prize as "The Best Actress" of "Goi Giac Mo Ve" film
- 2010: got HTV Award prize as "The Best Actress" of "Doi Mat" film
- 2011: got "Singer of Prospect" award of "Lan Song Xanh"
- 2013: was the winner in the third season of Dancing with the Star, with dancer, Atanas Georgiev Malamov
- 2015: was a jurywoman of "Bước nhảy hoàn vũ nhí" – Dancing with the Star for Kid
- 2015: got "Mai Vang" prize as "The Best Actress" of "Vua Di Vua Khoc" film

== Filmography ==
Year	Title	Role	Notes
2005	Gió thiên đường	Dung	
2005	Mộng phù du	Băng Châu	
2005	Vì đó là em	Như	
2006	Ngã rẽ cuộc đời	Như	
2007	Cái bóng bên chồng	Hiền	
2007	Gọi giấc mơ về	Phụng	
2008	Trinh thám Sài Gòn	Thanh Hằng	
2008	Giải cứu thần chết	Phạm An An	
2009	Ngôi nhà hạnh phúc	Minh Minh	Vietnamese remake of Full House
2009	Những nụ hôn rực rỡ	An	
2010	Đối mặt	Xoan Trà / Phương Linh	
2011	Tối nay, 8 giờ!	Minh Hằng (singer)	
2011	Rio	Jewel	Vietnamese version
2012	Lệ phí tình yêu	Diệu	
2013	Vừa đi vừa khóc	Đông Dương	
2016	Bao giờ có yêu nhau	Linh	
2017	Sắc đẹp ngàn cân	Hà My/Lilly	
