= Vũ Thu Phương =

Vietnamese actress and model

Vũ Thu Phương (born October 8, 1985) is a Vietnamese actress and model.

== Biography ==
Phương was born in Nam Dinh; the family moved to Ho Chi Minh City in 1997. She started her career as a model, and in 2008 she won two awards in a national modelling competition: best model and most talented model.

In 2008, the Weinstein Company offered Phương a bilingual speaking role as a supporting character in the film Shanghai. During production, the scope of the role was reduced and in editing, many of the scenes featuring her were omitted. She was invited by the company's executive Harvey Weinstein to discuss appearing in other Weinstein Company films. Phuong has stated that Weinstein behaved inappropriately towards her during the meeting, and that she left Hollywood and acting as a result of the experience.

In 2011, she announced her retirement from acting, citing media rumours and slander regarding her lifestyle as the cause. Phương completed filming her final movie, Khát vọng thượng lưu, in October of that year.

In 2019, she was a judge for the Miss Universe Vietnam pageant.
