= List of Vietnam's Next Top Model contestants =

This articles shows the full summary or complete list of contestants from Vietnam's Next Top Model in all cycles together with their active participation in their respective cycles and placements they had finished. Each cycle's prizes may vary depending on the season's winner.

== Contestants ==
(ages stated are at time of contest)

The contestant was previously participated in any of the first 7 cycles in this series in order to participate for the second time in the All-stars cycle.
The contestant participated in the mainstream regional franchise.
The contestant who was announced as the winner of the particular cycle.
The contestant who won in the Online Edition of this series.
The contestant is a male who participated in the Co-ed edition of this series from Cycles 4-7.

Contestant	Age	Hometown	Height	Finish	Place	Cycle
Trần Lê Hoài Thương	22	Ho Chi Minh City	1.75 m (5 ft 9 in)	Episode 4	15-14	Cycle 1
Lại Thị Thanh Hương	18	Haiphong	1.68 m (5 ft 6 in)	Episode 4	15-14	Cycle 1
Bùi Thị Thu Thùy	19	Hanoi	1.73 m (5 ft 8 in)	Episode 5	13	Cycle 1
Nguyễn Thanh Hằng	18	Hanoi	1.68 m (5 ft 6 in)	Episode 6	12	Cycle 1
Bùi Thị Hoàng Oanh	20	Bà Rịa–Vũng Tàu	1.70 m (5 ft 7 in)	Episode 7	11	Cycle 1
Nguyễn Diệp Anh	21	Hanoi	1.67 m (5 ft 5 1/2 in)	Episode 8	10	Cycle 1
Hồ Mỹ Phương	21	Thừa Thiên–Huế	1.66 m (5 ft 5 1/2 in)	Episode 9	9	Cycle 1
Phạm Thị Hương	19	Haiphong	1.73 m (5 ft 8 in)	Episode 10	8	Cycle 1
Nguyễn Giáng Hương	20	Phú Thọ	1.70 m (5 ft 7 in)	Episode 11	7	Cycle 1
Đàm Thu Trang	21	Lạng Sơn	1.73 m (5 ft 8 in)	Episode 12	6	Cycle 1
Trần Thị Thu Hiền	21	Vĩnh Phúc	1.72 m (5 ft 7 1/2 in)	Episode 13	5	Cycle 1
Đỗ Thị Thanh Hoa	20	Ha Noi	1.68 m (5 ft 6 in)	Episode 14	4	Cycle 1
Nguyễn Thu Thủy	20	Hanoi	1.71 m (5 ft 7 1/2 in)	Episode 15	3	Cycle 1
Nguyễn Thị Tuyết Lan	20	Ho Chi Minh City	1.75 m (5 ft 9 in)	Episode 15	2	Cycle 1
Khiếu Thị Huyền Trang	20	Bắc Giang	1.78 m (5 ft 10 in)	Episode 15	1	Cycle 1
Lưu Khánh Linh	18	Haiphong	1.77 m (5 ft 9 1/2 in)	Episode 4	15	Cycle 2
Kikki Le	22	Malmö, Sweden	1.74 m (5 ft 8 1/2 in)	Episode 5	14	Cycle 2
Huỳnh Thị Kim Tuyền	21	Cần Thơ	1.70 m (5 ft 7 in)	Episode 6	13	Cycle 2
Dương Thị Dung	23	Bắc Giang	1.76 m (5 ft 9 1/2 in)	Episode 7	12	Cycle 2
Phan Ngọc Phương Nghi	19	Ho Chi Minh City	1.81 m (5 ft 11 1/2 in)	Episode 8	11-10	Cycle 2
Nguyễn Thị Hoàng Oanh	24	Ho Chi Minh City	1.73 m (5 ft 8 in)	Episode 8	11-10	Cycle 2
Nguyễn Thùy Dương	21	Ho Chi Minh City	1.74 m (5 ft 8 1/2 in)	Episode 9	9	Cycle 2
Lê Thị Phương	20	Thanh Hóa	1.73 m (5 ft 8 in)	Episode 10	8-7	Cycle 2
Trần Thanh Thủy	22	Khánh Hòa	1.77 m (5 ft 9 1/2 in)	Episode 10	8-7	Cycle 2
Nguyễn Thị Tuyết	18	Hanoi	1.75 m (5 ft 9 in)	Episode 11	6	Cycle 2
Nguyễn Thị Phương Anh	23	Hanoi	1.74 m (5 ft 8 1/2 in)	Episode 12	5	Cycle 2
Nguyễn Thị Thùy Trang	23	Đắk Lắk	1.77 m (5 ft 9 1/2 in)	Episode 13	4	Cycle 2
Lê Thị Thúy	20	Quảng Bình	1.80 m (5 ft 11 in)	Episode 14	3	Cycle 2
Nguyễn Thị Trà My	19	Hanoi	1.78 m (5 ft 10 in)	Episode 14	2	Cycle 2
Hoàng Thị Thùy	19	Thanh Hóa	1.76 m (5 ft 9 1/2 in)	Episode 14	1	Cycle 2
Nguyễn Thị Châm	20	Quảng Ninh	1.81 m (5 ft 11 1/2 in)	Episode 4	15	Cycle 3
Nguyễn Thị Hằng	21	Phú Thọ	1.72 m (5 ft 7 1/2 in)	Episode 5	14	Cycle 3
Lương Thị Kim Loan	23	An Giang	1.71 m (5 ft 7 1/2 in)	Episode 6	13	Cycle 3
Lê Thị Hằng	19	Vĩnh Phúc	1.81 m (5 ft 11 1/2 in)	Episode 7	12-11	Cycle 3
Cao Thị Hà	20	Hanoi	1.77 m (5 ft 9 1/2 in)	Episode 7	12-11	Cycle 3
Lê Thanh Thảo	19	Vĩnh Long	1.74 m (5 ft 8 1/2 in)	Episode 8	10	Cycle 3
Đỗ Thu Hà	20	Hanoi	1.75 m (5 ft 9 in)	Episode 9	9	Cycle 3
Vũ Thị Minh Nguyệt	18	Hà Nam	1.78 m (5 ft 10 in)	Episode 10	8	Cycle 3
Nguyễn Thị Ngọc Thuý	21	Ho Chi Minh City	1.81 m (5 ft 11 1/2 in)	Episode 14	7-4	Cycle 3
Nguyễn Thị Nhã Trúc	23	Long An	1.72 m (5 ft 7 1/2 in)	Episode 14	7-4	Cycle 3
Dương Thị Thanh	22	Thái Nguyên	1.77 m (5 ft 9 1/2 in)	Episode 14	7-4	Cycle 3
Nguyễn Thị Ngân	22	Hanoi	1.78 m (5 ft 10 in)	Episode 14	7-4	Cycle 3
Cao Thị Thiên Trang	19	Ho Chi Minh City	1.75 m (5 ft 9 in)	Episode 15	3	Cycle 3
Kha Mỹ Vân	23	Ho Chi Minh City	1.77 m (5 ft 9 1/2 in)	Episode 15	2	Cycle 3
Mai Thị Giang	21	Hai Phong	1.76 m (5 ft 9 1/2 in)	Episode 15	1	Cycle 3
Nguyễn Quốc Minh Tòng	22	Đắk Lắk	1.85 m (6 ft 1 in)	Episode 3	18-15	Cycle 4
Lê Uyên Phương Thảo	23	Đồng Nai	1.71 m (5 ft 7 1/2 in)	Episode 3	18-15	Cycle 4
Đỗ Thị Kim Ngân	20	Lạng Sơn	1.74 m (5 ft 8 1/2 in)	Episode 3	18-15	Cycle 4
Ngô Thị Quỳnh Mai	18	Ho Chi Minh City	1.72 m (5 ft 7 1/2 in)	Episode 3	18-15	Cycle 4
Tạ Thúc Bình	21	Hà Nội	1.80 m (5 ft 11 in)	Episode 4	14-13	Cycle 4
Phan Thị Thùy Linh	21	Lâm Đồng	1.73 m (5 ft 8 in)	Episode 4	14-13	Cycle 4
Phạm Thị Kim Thoa	24	Lào Cai	1.74 m (5 ft 8 1/2 in)	Episode 5	12	Cycle 4
Trần Mạnh Kiên	21	Vĩnh Phúc	1.85 m (6 ft 1 in)	Episode 6	11	Cycle 4
Nguyễn Trần Trung	20	Hanoi	1.83 m (6 ft 0 in)	Episode 7	10-9	Cycle 4
Đinh Hà Thu	24	Hải Phòng	1.72 m (5 ft 7 1/2 in)	Episode 7	10-9	Cycle 4
Nguyễn Thị Thanh	20	Thái Bình	1.75 m (5 ft 9 in)	Episode 8	8	Cycle 4
Trần Quang Đại	21	Vũng Tàu	1.84 m (6 ft 1/2 in)	Episode 9	7	Cycle 4
Dương Mạc Anh Quân	24	Hanoi	1.86 m (6 ft 1 in)	Episode 10	6-5	Cycle 4
Nguyễn Thị Hằng	20	Đồng Nai	1.75 m (5 ft 9 in)	Episode 10	6-5	Cycle 4
Lê Văn Kiên	20	Thanh Hóa	1.89 m (6 ft 2 1/2 in)	Episode 11	4-3	Cycle 4
Nguyễn Thị Chà Mi	19	Phú Thọ	1.74 m (5 ft 8 1/2 in)	Episode 11	4-3	Cycle 4
Vũ Tuấn Việt	21	Hải Dương	1.82 m (5 ft 11 1/2 in)	Episode 11	2	Cycle 4
Mâu Thị Thanh Thủy	21	Ho Chi Minh City	1.78 m (5 ft 10 in)	Episode 11	1	Cycle 4
Hồ Văn Năm	23	Nghệ An	1.81 m (5 ft 11 1/2 in)	Episode 2	16-15	Cycle 5
Nguyễn Văn Thắng	23	Berlin	1.79 m (5 ft 10 1/2 in)	Episode 2	16-15	Cycle 5
Nguyễn Thị Thanh Tuyền	19	Ho Chi Minh City	1.81 m (5 ft 11 1/2 in)	Episode 3	14	Cycle 5
Lê Đức Anh	20	Hà Nội	1.86 m (6 ft 1 in)	Episode 4	13	Cycle 5
Lê Thị Kim Dung	21	Nam Định	1.77 m (5 ft 9 1/2 in)	Episode 5	12	Cycle 5
Trần Yến Nhi	23	Kiên Giang	1.76 m (5 ft 9 1/2 in)	Episode 6	11-10	Cycle 5
Phạm Công Toàn	24	Đồng Nai	1.86 m (6 ft 1 in)	Episode 6	11-10	Cycle 5
Chế Nguyễn Quỳnh Châu	20	Đà Lạt	1.74 m (5 ft 8 1/2 in)	Episode 7	9-8	Cycle 5
Lê Đăng Khánh	19	Ho Chi Minh City	1.86 m (6 ft 1 in)	Episode 7	9-8	Cycle 5
Phạm Tấn Khang	18	Los Angeles	1.85 m (6 ft 1 in)	Episode 8	7	Cycle 5
Đặng Văn Hội	20	Thái Bình	1.93 m (6 ft 4 in)	Episode 10	6	Cycle 5
Cao Thị Ngân	22	Cần Thơ	1.78 m (5 ft 10 in)	Episode 11	5-3	Cycle 5
Phạm Duy Anh	19	Hà Nội	1.89 m (6 ft 2 1/2 in)	Episode 11	5-3	Cycle 5
Tiêu Ngọc Linh	20	Hải Dương	1.78 m (5 ft 10 in)	Episode 11	5-3	Cycle 5
Tạ Quang Hùng	20	Gia Lai	1.88 m (6 ft 2 in)	Episode 11	2-1	Cycle 5
Nguyễn Thị Oanh	18	Quảng Ninh	1.83 m (6 ft 0 in)	Episode 11	2-1	Cycle 5
Nguyễn Thành Quốc	22	Vĩnh Long	1.85 m (6 ft 1 in)	Episode 2	14	Cycle 6
Nguyễn Thị Kim Phương	19	Cần Thơ	1.77 m (5 ft 9 1/2 in)	Episode 4	13-12	Cycle 6
Trần Hải Đăng	22	Nam Định	1.93 m (6 ft 4 in)	Episode 4	13-12	Cycle 6
Hoàng Gia Anh Vũ	20	Hà Nội	1.81 m (5 ft 11 1/2 in)	Episode 5	11	Cycle 6
Hoàng Anh Tú	22	Hải Phòng	1.84 m (6 ft 1/2 in)	Episode 7	10	Cycle 6
H'Hen Niê	23	Đắk Lắk	1.75 m (5 ft 9 in)	Episode 8	9-8	Cycle 6
Đào Thị Thu	22	Hà Tĩnh	1.74 m (5 ft 8 1/2 in)	Episode 8	9-8	Cycle 6
Nguyễn Thị Hồng Vân	19	Hà Nội	1.81 m (5 ft 11 1/2 in)	Episode 9	7	Cycle 6
Đinh Đức Thành	20	Hà Tĩnh	1.85 m (6 ft 1 in)	Episode 10	6-5	Cycle 6
K' Brơi	23	Lâm Đồng	1.80 m (5 ft 11 in)	Episode 10	6-5	Cycle 6
Võ Thành An	21	Đà Lạt	1.84 m (6 ft 1/2 in)	Episode 11	4-2	Cycle 6
Nguyễn Thị Hợp	23	Quảng Ninh	1.73 m (5 ft 8 in)	Episode 11	4-2	Cycle 6
Lương Thị Hồng Xuân	19	Vũng Tàu	1.90 m (6 ft 3 in)	Episode 11	4-2	Cycle 6
Nguyễn Thị Hương Ly	20	Gia Lai	1.76 m (5 ft 9 1/2 in)	Episode 11	1	Cycle 6
Phạm Gia Long	19	Hà Nội	1.77 m (5 ft 9 1/2 in)	Episode 2	18-17	Cycle 7
Nguyễn Thị Thùy Dung	22	Bắc Ninh	1.76 m (5 ft 9 1/2 in)	Episode 2	18-17	Cycle 7
Trương Bùi Hoài Nam	21	Thanh Hoá	1.72 m (5 ft 7 1/2 in)	Episode 4	16-14	Cycle 7
Hà Thị Út Trang	20	Quảng Nam	1.73 m (5 ft 8 in)	Episode 4	16-14	Cycle 7
Nguyễn Duy Minh	19	Hà Nội	1.79 m (5 ft 10 1/2 in)	Episode 4	16-14	Cycle 7
Nguyễn Anh Thư	22	Long An	1.79 m (5 ft 10 1/2 in)	Episode 6	13	Cycle 7
Hoàng Minh Tùng	24	Lạng Sơn	1.80 m (5 ft 11 in)	Episode 7	12	Cycle 7
Nguyễn Thị Phương	19	Hà Nội	1.72 m (5 ft 7 1/2 in)	Episode 8	11-10	Cycle 7
Bùi Huy Dương	20	Hà Nội	1.90 m (6 ft 3 in)	Episode 8	11-10	Cycle 7
Vũ Trần Kim Nhã	26	Ho Chi Minh City	1.70 m (5 ft 7 in)	Episode 9	9	Cycle 7
Trần Thị Thùy Trâm	20	Quảng Nam	1.68 m (5 ft 6 in)	Episode 10	8	Cycle 7
Nguyễn Thiếu Lan	19	Đồng Nai	1.71 m (5 ft 7 1/2 in)	Episode 11	7-6	Cycle 7
Trịnh Thu Hường	21	Hà Nội	1.75 m (5 ft 9 in)	Episode 11	7-6	Cycle 7
Trần Thị Thùy Trang	19	Hà Nội	1.77 m (5 ft 9 1/2 in)	Episode 12	5-4	Cycle 7
Nguyễn Minh Phong	23	Tiền Giang	1.86 m (6 ft 1 in)	Episode 12	5-4	Cycle 7
La Thanh Thanh	23	Bình Dương	1.54 m (5 ft 1/2 in)	Episode 12	3-2	Cycle 7
Nguyễn Huy Quang	21	Hải Dương	1.88 m (6 ft 2 in)	Episode 12	3-2	Cycle 7
Nguyễn Thị Ngọc Châu	22	Tây Ninh	1.74 m (5 ft 8 1/2 in)	Episode 12	1	Cycle 7
Nguyễn Thị Phương Oanh	18	Điện Biên	1.78 m (5 ft 10 in)	Episode 2	13	Cycle 8
Lương Thị Hồng Xuân	21	Vũng Tàu	1.90 m (6 ft 3 in)	Episode 4	12	Cycle 8
Nguyễn Hồng Anh	19	Nghệ An	1.70 m (5 ft 7 in)	Episode 5	11-10	Cycle 8
Trần Thị Thùy Trâm	21	Quảng Nam	1.68 m (5 ft 6 in)	Episode 5	11-10	Cycle 8
Nguyễn Thị Hoàng Oanh	30	Ho Chi Minh City	1.73 m (5 ft 8 in)	Episode 6	9	Cycle 8
Lại Thị Thanh Hương	25	Hải Phòng	1.68 m (5 ft 6 in)	Episode 7	8	Cycle 8
Kikki Lê	28	Malmö, Sweden	1.74 m (5 ft 8 1/2 in)	Episode 8	7	Cycle 8
Nguyễn Thị Hợp	25	Quảng Ninh	1.73 m (5 ft 8 in)	Episode 10	6	Cycle 8
Cao Thị Ngân	25	Cần Thơ	1.78 m (5 ft 10 in)	Episode 11	5-4	Cycle 8
Cao Thị Thiên Trang	24	Ho Chi Minh City	1.75 m (5 ft 9 in)	Episode 11	5-4	Cycle 8
Nguyễn Thùy Dương	27	Ho Chi Minh City	1.74 m (5 ft 8 1/2 in)	Episode 12	3-2	Cycle 8
Nguyễn Thị Chà Mi	23	Phú Thọ	1.74 m (5 ft 8 1/2 in)	Episode 12	3-2	Cycle 8
Lê Thị Kim Dung	24	Nam Định	1.77 m (5 ft 9 1/2 in)	Episode 12	1	Cycle 8

== See also ==
- List of Asia's Next Top Model contestants
- List of America's Next Top Model contestants
