= Vietnam's Next Top Model season 8 =

Vietnam's Next Top Model
- Season 8

Release
- Original network: VTV3
- Original release: June 24 – September 9, 2017

Season chronology
- ← Previous; Cycle 7 Next → Season 9

The eighth cycle of Vietnam's Next Top Model (subtitled as Vietnam's Next Top Model: All Stars and stylized as Vietnam's Next Top Model ALL ★ STARS) premiered on June 24, 2017 on VTV3. The cycle was originally announced to be an all-stars co-ed cycle, but was later changed to the original format of an all-female cycle. This cycle featured contestants who had previously competed in cycles 1-7 who were not the winners. In addition to the all-star cast, a separate search was held for all-new aspiring contestants. For this cycle, the entire panel of judges was replaced. The jury consisted of model-actress Trương Ngọc Ánh, make-up artist Đinh Nam Trung, and model Võ Hoàng Yến. Ngọc Ánh acted as the show's host, while Nam Trung served as the show's creative director, and Hoàng Yến served as a model mentor.

The winner of the competition was 24-year-old Lê Thị Kim Dung, who originally placed 12th in cycle 5.

== Overview ==
=== Auditions ===
In addition to the returning contestants, an online contest organized by Kenh14.vn in partnership with Maybelline was held to find an additional a best contestant, who would enter the model house alongside the all-star cast. The winner of the Top Model Online search, Nguyễn Hồng Anh, was chosen through a popular vote. An additional contestant scouted in the same search, Nguyễn Thị Phương Oanh, was also chosen by the judges.

=== Prizes ===
- 3-year modeling contract with YGKPlus in South Korea under BeU Models' assistance.
- A cover feature in Harper's Bazaar Vietnam.
- Opening face for Vietnam International Fashion Week Fall/Winter on November 1–5, 2017 in Hanoi.
- A voucher from the interior furniture brand Pho Xinh valued 100,000,000 VND (US$4,399).
- A trip to one of the largest cotton fields in the United States sponsored by CANIFA.
- A trip to Seoul, South Korea, for the final top 3 contestants.

== Cast ==
=== Contestants ===
Contestant	Age	Height	Hometown	Original cycle	Original placement	Finish	Place
Nguyễn Thị Phương Oanh	18	1.78 m (5 ft 10 in)	Điện Biên	Top Model Online (Note: Oanh P. and Anh were scouted through a separate process from the all-star cast, through the Top Model Online search organized by Kenh14.vn. Anh was the winner of this search, while Oanh P. was selected by the judges.)		Episode 2	13
Lương Thị Hồng Xuân	21	1.90 m (6 ft 3 in)	Vũng Tàu	Cycle 6	4-2	Episode 4	12
Nguyễn Hồng Anh	19	1.70 m (5 ft 7 in)	Nghệ An	Top Model Online		Episode 5	11-10
Trần Thị Thùy Trâm	21	1.68 m (5 ft 6 in)	Quảng Nam	Cycle 7	8	Episode 5	11-10
Nguyễn Thị Hoàng Oanh	30	1.73 m (5 ft 8 in)	Hồ Chí Minh City	Cycle 2	11-10	Episode 6	9
Lại Thị Thanh Hương	26	1.68 m (5 ft 6 in)	Hải Phòng	Cycle 1	15-14	Episode 7	8
Minh Thúy 'Kikki' Lê	28	1.74 m (5 ft 8 1/2 in)	Malmö, Sweden	Cycle 2	14	Episode 8	7
Nguyễn Thị Hợp	25	1.74 m (5 ft 8 1/2 in)	Quảng Ninh	Cycle 6	4-2	Episode 10	6
Cao Thị Ngân	25	1.78 m (5 ft 10 in)	Kiên Giang	Cycle 5	5-3	Episode 11	5-4
Cao Thị Thiên Trang	24	1.76 m (5 ft 9 1/2 in)	Hồ Chí Minh City	Cycle 3	3	Episode 11	5-4
Nguyễn Thùy Dương	27	1.74 m (5 ft 8 1/2 in)	Hồ Chí Minh City	Cycle 2	9	Episode 12	3-2
Nguyễn Thị Chà Mi	23	1.74 m (5 ft 8 1/2 in)	Phú Thọ	Cycle 4	4-3	Episode 12	3-2
Lê Thị Kim Dung	24	1.78 m (5 ft 10 in)	Nam Định	Cycle 5	12	Episode 12	1

=== Judges ===
- Trương Ngọc Ánh (host)
- Võ Hoàng Yến
- Đinh Nam Trung

== Episodes ==
=== Episode 1 ===
Original airdate: June 24, 2017

The show recapped the achievements of the previous winners and contestants from the show, before introducing former models of the previous cycles who would be competing again as models for an all stars cycle. In addition to the returning models, there were also two new models, Oanh P. and Anh, who were chosen through a separate online search. After the judges had introduced themselves, the models had a photo shoot where they were hung upside down. They later attended a red carpet challenge at the Grand Palace Events Centre in Ho Chi Minh City. At elimination, the models were divided into two groups - one of which was safe from elimination. The best performing contestants from the challenge; Trâm, Oanh P., Dung, Hợp, Hương, Mi, and Dương were declared safe. Trang was deemed to be the best performer from the photo shoot, followed by Oanh H., Ngân, and Kikki. Anh and Xuân landed in the bottom two, but neither of them was eliminated.

- Best photo: Trần Thị Thùy Trâm
- Bottom 2: Lương Thị Hồng Xuân & Nguyễn Hồng Anh
- Eliminated: None

=== Episode 2 ===
Original airdate: July 1, 2017

The models had a timed runway challenge individually and in teams. The winner of the individual challenge was Trâm, while Ngân, Hương, and Oanh H. won the group challenge.

- Challenge winners: Trần Thị Thùy Trâm (individual round) - Cao Thị Ngân, Lại Thị Thanh Hương & Nguyễn Thị Hoàng Oanh (group round)

At the photo shoot, the contestants were dressed in Peking opera-inspired outfits, and had to pose in pairs whilst wearing stilts to resemble marionettes. At elimination, Dương and Trang received best photo as a pair, while Xuân and Oanh P. landed in the bottom two. Xuân was allowed to remain in the competition, and Oanh P. was eliminated. After becoming the leaders of the house, Dương and Trang told Hop to give them her bed. However, Hop flatly refused. Hop then told Kikki to get out of her room, which sparked a heated argument between Hop and team Sang (which consists of Duong, Kikki Le, Trang and later Tram and Xuan).

- Best photo: Cao Thiên Trang & Nguyễn Thuỳ Dương
- Bottom 4: Lương Thị Hồng Xuân & Nguyễn Thị Phương Oanh & Cao Thị Ngân & Lê Thị Kim Dung
- Eliminated: Nguyễn Thị Phương Oanh

=== Episode 3 ===
Original airdate: July 8, 2017

The models were interviewed by various local and international fashion designers for casting on upcoming fashion week events. Xuân, Kikki, Dung, and Trang were the only ones who could speak English, especially Kikki, as she was the most fluent English speaker among them.

At the runway challenge, all of them had to show how they perform their catwalk using the clothes that were designed by various local and international designers. In the end, Hợp (4 shows) and Trang (3 shows with one opening and one closing position) scored the highest.

At the photo shoot, the girls have to fly away their scarf for them to be taken by a camera click. Dương, Anh, Trang, Oanh H., and Ngân struggled while the rest of them impressed the judges. Hợp prevailed by receiving her first call-out, while Ngân and Oanh H. fell down in bottom two. Oanh H. was the last person to be saved, leaving Ngân eliminated. But, in a surprising twist, Ngọc Ánh gave her a second chance to stay.

- First call-out: Nguyễn Thị Hợp
- Bottom 2: Nguyễn Thị Hoàng Oanh & Cao Thị Ngân
- Originally eliminated: Cao Thị Ngân

=== Episode 4 ===
Original airdate: July 15, 2017

Tension in the model house began to brew over Hợp's unexpected emergence as the winner of best photo at the previous elimination. Hop told team Sang to move out of the leader room in 3 hours. However, when Hop came back, team Sang was still there and hadn't moved their belongings out of the room. Hop got hot under the collar and threw team some of Sang's belongings out of the room. Trang and Kikki threw water at Hop. The fight only ended after the camera intervened. The models were then taken to the IVY Moda store for their challenge, in which they had to mix and match various articles of clothing to out-style one another. The winner of the challenge was Dung.

- Challenge winner: Lê Thị Kim Dung

At the photo shoot, the models had to walk down a catwalk as they danced to music, as part of a recreation of Tom Ford's Spring/Summer 2016 campaign with Lady Gaga. At elimination, Kikki was awarded best photo, which she considered a very meaningful victory as she was eliminated 6 years before in season 2 by the photoshoot of the same theme. Oanh landed in the bottom two with Xuân, for the latter's third time. Oanh was given another chance, and Xuân was eliminated from the competition.

- First call-out: Kikki Lê
- Bottom 2: Lương Thị Hồng Xuân & Nguyễn Thị Hoàng Oanh
- Eliminated: Lương Thị Hồng Xuân

=== Episode 5 ===
Original airdate: July 22, 2017

The girls went to Suoi Tien Amusement Park. The Spooky Maze Challenge to tested their courage in the high fashion stint, as they pick up their lost fashion elements to wear until the end of the maze. Hop was scared out of her wits but eventually overcame her fear and completed the challenge. Anh succeeded with courage, earning herself a challenge win.

- Challenge winner: Nguyễn Hồng Anh

At the photo shoot, the girls had to lay down on a floor covered with rocks as they pose with two huge snakes. After Ngân was on the verge of being eliminated in episode 3, she was awarded her first best photo. Anh, despite being the challenge winner, landed to the bottom 3 with Hợp and Trâm. Hợp was the first to be called safe, leaving Anh & Trâm in the bottom two. However, Ngọc Ánh showed a blank photo, eliminating them both from the competition, much to Trâm's disappointment.

- First call-out: Cao Thị Ngân
- Bottom 3: Nguyễn Hồng Anh & Nguyễn Thị Hợp & Trần Thị Thùy Trâm
- Eliminated: Nguyễn Hồng Anh & Trần Thị Thùy Trâm

=== Episode 6 ===
Original airdate: July 29, 2017

The remaining girls cried over the departure letters that came from Anh and Trâm. As the week's winner of best photo, Ngân ordered a house meeting, which was met with mockeries from Dương, Kikki, and Trang. The contestants learned paso doble from dance-sport master Khánh Thy. They then competed in groups, with Dương, Hương and Ngân winning. Contestants then posed for photo shoots with paso-doble moves. Hợp won the individual challenge.

- Challenge winner: Nguyễn Thị Hợp (individual) - Nguyễn Thùy Dương, Lại Thị Thanh Hương and Cao Thị Ngân (group)

The week's photo shoot involved posing on a rope ladder while being splashed with water. Mi was awarded best photo, while Oanh and Trang landed in the bottom two. Ngọc Ánh gave them their photos, but then asked both of them to flip their photos. Ngọc Ánh then told them that who had the model's photo with the All-Stars logo would stay. Both Oanh and Trang flipped their photos, and it was revealed that Oanh was eliminated.

- First call-out: Nguyễn Chà Mi
- Bottom 2: Nguyễn Thị Hoàng Oanh & Cao Thiên Trang
- Eliminated: Nguyễn Thị Hoàng Oanh

=== Episode 7 ===
Original airdate: August 5, 2017

In the challenge, the contestants have to roll the circular platform when they do their catwalks, which also brought up to photo shoots but in different stunts which contestants teamed up to two which they have to portray their most flexible pose together. Duong & Huong, Mi & Dung, Trang & Hop, and Kikki & Ngan paired up together for their big gown face-off challenge when they were in the judging panel. Hop, Dung, Kikki and Duong won immunity, while the others are in the bottom four, who performed an additional cat walking challenge. Ngoc Anh announced that Huong was eliminated while Trang, Ngan & Mi were saved.

- Immune: Nguyễn Hợp, Kikki Lê, Nguyễn Thùy Dương, Lê Thị Kim Dung
- First call-out: Lê Thị Kim Dung
- Bottom 4: Cao Thị Ngân & Cao Thiên Trang & Lại Thị Thanh Hương & Nguyễn Thị Chà Mi
- Eliminated: Lại Thị Thanh Hương

=== Episode 8 ===
Original airdate: August 12, 2017

For the first time in this series, this is the first episode where the scoring chart system which was evaluated through challenge scores and judges during the deliberation of photo shoots.

The 7 remaining girls have to face their heights with courage. Dung prevailed as the top performer for the second time after she gained her first best photo in the previous episode. Subsequently, Ngan, Duong, Trang & Mi were saved despite their fear of heights and tension in the judging panel. Hop & Kikki slipped down to bottom two. Both of them gained a best photo during the cycle. To Trang's disapproval Kikki was eventually eliminated for having a slightly lower progress score than Hop. This episode sparked controversy on social media as Kikki was thought to have performed better than Hop throughout the cycle.

Score
#	Model	Judges	Chall.	Progress	Total
1	Dung	26.49			
2	Ngân	25.83			
3	Dương	24.07			
4	Trang	23.46			
5	Mi	22.97			
6	Hợp	8.00	6.33	8.23	22.56
7	Kikki	7.33	6.66	7.76	21.75

- First call-out Lê Thị Kim Dung
- Bottom 2: Kikki Lê & Nguyễn Thị Hợp
- Eliminated: Kikki Lê

=== Episode 9 ===
Original airdate: August 19, 2017

The 6 remaining contestants have to do their action-themed acting skills and stunts for them to appear either on TV, Movies or even in Theater Stage. This was a non-competition round.

- Challenge Winner: Cao Thiên Trang
- Eliminated : None

=== Episode 10 ===
Original airdate: August 26, 2017

The 6 remaining models went to IVY Moda store in order to conduct a meeting with an executive for the upcoming campaign. They need balancing for them to cross the seesaw to reach the male model who offers something to each and everyone of them.

At the judging panel, Hop was eliminated because she refused to perform an acting challenge despite having the third best photo of the week. She left in tears and apologized to other contestants. Ngan and Mi are placed in a non-elimination bottom two spots.

- Eliminated before panel: Nguyễn Thị Hợp
- First call-out: Nguyễn Thùy Dương
- Bottom 2: Cao Thị Ngân & Nguyễn Thị Chà Mi
- Eliminated: None

=== Episode 11 ===
Original airdate: September 2, 2017

The models had to feature in a fashion campaign video as a group and stand out amongst the rest. They were then tasked to promote Vietnam International Fashion Week in a video shoot, testing both their modelling abilities and eloquence. Dương came out on top once again, Ngân & Trang were eliminated.

After the elimination, the final 3 were flown to Seoul, where they met with YGKPlus and shot a commercial for Canifa and for BeU Models.

- First call-out: Nguyễn Thuỳ Dương
- Bottom 3: Cao Thiên Trang & Lê Thị Kim Dung & Cao Thị Ngân
- Eliminated: Cao Thiên Trang & Cao Thị Ngân
- Special guest: Trang Lê, Morten Andersen, Eun-young Ko, Sora Choi

=== Episode 12 ===
Original airdate: September 9, 2017

- Final three: Lê Thị Kim Dung & Nguyễn Thuỳ Dương & Nguyễn Chà Mi
- Vietnam's Next Top Model 2017: Lê Thị Kim Dung

== Summaries ==
=== Call-out order ===
Order	Episodes										
Order	1 (Note: In episode 1, the call-out order did not reflect each model's performance.)	2 (Note: In episode 2, the call-out order did not reflect each model's performance. The models were called in groups, with the exception of the bottom four.)	3 (Note: In episode 3, Ngân was originally eliminated from the competition but was saved.)	4 (Note: In episode 4, Hợp left the judging panel after she was evaluated, as she was not feeling well. At elimination, she was called out in absence.)	5	6 (Note: In episode 6, H. Oanh and Trang both landed in the bottom two. Ánh gave both of them a copy of their photo from the shoot, but revealed that only the contestant whose photo was stamped with the show's All-Star logo would be allowed to stay. Trang received the photo with the logo, and H. Oanh was eliminated.)	7 (Note: In episode 7, The judges granted Dung, Dương, Hợp and Kikki immunity for performing well in the challenge. Hương, Mi, Ngân, and Trang participated in a runway challenge to keep them in the competition. Mi left the judging panel after she was evaluated in the challenge after fainting backstage. Ánh then told the bottom group that it was Hương who would be going home.)	8	10 (Note: In episode 10, Ánh called Hợp forward before judging and told her that she was eliminated due to her attitude and not participating at the challenge resulting a non-elimination between Mi and Ngân.)	11	12
1	Trang	Mi; H. Oanh	Hợp	Kikki	Ngân	Mi	Dung	Dung	Dương	Dương	Dung
2	P. Oanh	Mi; H. Oanh	Trang	Trâm	Trang	Kikki	Hợp	Ngân	Trang	Mi	Mi; Dương
3	Dung	Dương; Trang	Dung	Hương	Dương	Dương	Dương	Dương	Dung	Dung	Mi; Dương
4	Hợp	Dương; Trang	Kikki	Dương	Mi	Ngân	Kikki	Trang	Mi; Ngân	Ngân; Trang	
5	Hương	Anh; Hương; Trâm	Mi	Hợp	Hương	Dung	Mi; Ngân; Trang	Mi	Mi; Ngân	Ngân; Trang	
6	Mi	Anh; Hương; Trâm	Trâm	Mi	Kikki	Hương	Mi; Ngân; Trang	Hợp	Hợp		
7	Dương	Anh; Hương; Trâm	Dương	Dung	Dung	Hợp	Mi; Ngân; Trang	Kikki			
8	Trâm	Hợp; Kikki	Hương	Trang	H. Oanh	Trang	Hương				
9	H. Oanh	Hợp; Kikki	Anh	Ngân	Hợp	H. Oanh					
10	Ngân	Dung	Xuân	Anh	Anh; Trâm						
11	Kikki	Ngân	H. Oanh	H. Oanh	Anh; Trâm						
12	Anh; Xuân	Xuân	Ngân	Xuân							
13	Anh; Xuân	P. Oanh									

The contestant was immune from elimination
The contestant won best photo of the week
The contestant was part of a non-elimination bottom two
The contestant was eliminated
The contestant was originally eliminated from the competition but was saved
The contestant was eliminated before panel
The contestant won the competition

=== Average call-out order ===
Episode 1,2 and 9 are not included

Rank by average	Place	Model	Call-out total	Number of call-outs	Call-out average
1	2-3	Dương	27	9	3.00
2	1	Dung	31	9	3.44
3-4	2-3	Mi	36	9	4.00
3-4	7	Kikki	24	6	4.00
5	4-5	Trang	36	8	4.50
6	6	Hợp	36	7	5.14
7	4-5	Ngân	42	8	5.25
8-9	8	Hương	30	5	6.00
8-9	10-11	Trâm	18	3	6.00
10	10-11	Anh	29	3	9.67
11	9	H.Oanh	39	4	9.75
12	12	Xuân	22	2	11.00
13	13	P.Oanh	13	1	13.00

=== Photo shoot guide ===
- Episode 1 photo shoot: Futuristic fashion hanging upside down
- Episode 2 photo shoot: Peking opera in pairs wearing stilts
- Episode 3 video shoot: Fashion film with silk and wind
- Episode 4 video shoot: Tom Ford S/S 2016 campaign recreation
- Episode 5 photo shoot: Posing with pythons
- Episode 6 photo shoot: Posing on a wire ladder with splashing water
- Episode 7 photo shoot: Posing on a rotating wheel in pairs
- Episode 8 photo shoot: Suspended in the air
- Episode 9 video shoot: Action video-shoot
- Episode 10 photo shoot: On a seesaw with a male model for Ivy Moda
- Episode 11 video shoots: Vietnam International Fashion Week promo; Canifa campaign
- Episode 12 photo shoot: Posing as a star
