= Vietnam's Next Top Model season 9 =

Vietnam's Next Top Model
- Season 9
- Hosted by: Thanh Hằng
- Judges: Thanh Hằng; Đỗ Mạnh Cường; Nam Trung; Hà Đỗ
- No. of contestants: 15
- Winner: Lại Mai Hoa
- No. of episodes: 11

Release
- Original network: VTV9; YouTube
- Original release: August 3 – October 12, 2025

Season chronology
- ← Previous; Season 8 Next → Season 10

The ninth cycle of Vietnam's Next Top Model started airing August 3, 2025 and ended airing October 2025, on VTV9, produced by Multimedia JSC. This marks the first time a season of this show is not aired on VTV3.

After an 8-year hiatus, the show returned with supermodel, actress & former host Thanh Hằng as the host of this season. Along with her, the judges who also return for this season are creative director & make-up artist Nam Trung, fashion designer Đỗ Mạnh Cường and Cannes Lions 2024 judge & editor-in-chief of Đẹp magazine Hà Đỗ.

The winner was 20 year-old Lại Mai Hoa from Hanoi.

== Overview ==
=== Top Model Online ===
Similar to several cycles, the organizers of the show began a contest named "Top Model Online", an online contest in partnership with L'Oréal & Philips was held to find an additional best contestant, who would enter the model house alongside the chosen cast. The winner of the Top Model Online search, Lại Mai Hoa, was chosen through a popular vote.

=== Auditions ===
Audition City	Date	Venue
Hanoi	May 14, 2025	Trong Dong Palace
Ho Chi Minh City	May 19, 2025	Grand Palace

=== Prizes ===
The winner wil receive:

- A two-year modeling contract with BeU Models
- Appears on the magazine cover of Harper's Bazaar
- An advertising contract with Chanté Detergent which include a photoshoot in Paris
- Becomes the face of Vietnam International Fashion Week Fall–Winter 2025
- A training course on "building and shaping style" by Image Coach
- A cash prize of 300.000.000VND
- An experience trip to the fashion capitals of the world

=== History ===
Following the conclusion of Season 8 in 2017, MultiMedia JSC announced in 2019 that production for season 9 would commence. Supermodel Võ Hoàng Yến was revealed as the new host, with former Vietnam's Next Top Model champion Mâu Thủy joining as a professional consultant and Nam Trung returning as creative director. Concurrently, the Top Model Online 2019 competition was launched to scout potential contestants for the season.

However, due to the global outbreak of the COVID-19 pandemic in 2020, the show was postponed indefinitely. After a six-year hiatus, Vietnam's Next Top Model resumed in 2025, beginning with the Top Model Online 2025 contest. The judging panel saw significant changes, as both Võ Hoàng Yến and Mâu Thủy stepped down from their roles, having become mothers during the extended postponement.

In this season, several rules was introduced as:

- In episode 2, which the contestants who were declared safe each week were given the right to vote for the contestant they believed should be eliminated from the danger zone. The contestant who received the fewest votes would remain in the competition. This format is similar to that used in Greece's Next Top Model season 4.
- From episode 6 to 8, each contestant will be presented with their 3 best shots from the photoshoot and they will have to choose the best one to the judges.

During the competition take place in Ho Chi Minh City, contestants will travel to many locations in Vietnam including: Hanoi and Phan Thiết (Lâm Đồng province). In particular, the finalist of this season will have an experience trip to Paris.

Chanté, Comfort, Philips, L'Oréal and Harper's Bazaar are the major sponsors of the program.

== Contestants ==
Contestant	Age	Height	Hometown	Finish	Place
Trương Thị Huyền Thương	30	1.71 m (5 ft 7 1/2 in)	Thanh Hoá	Episode 2	15
Phạm Hoài An	21	1.71 m (5 ft 7 1/2 in)	Ho Chi Minh City	Episode 3	14-13
Trần Tâm Thanh	25	1.68 m (5 ft 6 in)	Lào Cai	Episode 3	14-13
Ngô Thị Hằng	21	1.75 m (5 ft 9 in)	Quảng Trị	Episode 4	12-11
Đỗ Thu Uyên	27	1.71 m (5 ft 7 1/2 in)	Đà Nẵng	Episode 4	12-11
Trần Thị Ngọc Diệp	23	1.73 m (5 ft 8 in)	Ninh Bình	Episode 6	10-9
Dương Kim Thanh	22	1.77 m (5 ft 9 1/2 in)	Ho Chi Minh City	Episode 6	10-9
Lê Ngọc Ái Băng	19	1.78 m (5 ft 10 in)	Lâm Đồng	Episode 7	8 (quit)
Lê Mi Lan	21	1.78 m (5 ft 10 in)	Đắk Lắk	Episode 8	7
Trương Thị Tuyết Mai	26	1.78 m (5 ft 10 in)	Ho Chi Minh City	Episode 10	6-5
Lê Minh Trà My	18	1.68 m (5 ft 6 in)	Hanoi	Episode 10	6-5
Đỗ Phùng Hương Giang	20	1.77 m (5 ft 9 1/2 in)	Hanoi	Episode 11	4-2
Vũ Mỹ Ngân	25	1.82 m (5 ft 11 1/2 in)	Quảng Ninh	Episode 11	4-2
Lê Thị Bảo Ngọc	19	1.78 m (5 ft 10 in)	Đồng Tháp	Episode 11	4-2
Lại Mai Hoa	20	1.84 m (6 ft 1/2 in)	Hanoi	Episode 11	1

== Episode ==
No. overall	No. in season	Title	Original release date
103	1	"Doing like that then I will eliminated all 5 at once"	3 August 2025
From thousand of girls audition in Hanoi & Ho Chi Minh City, 15 girls got chosen and met each other at Parc Mall in Ho Chi Minh City, before moving to their penthouse. Then, they had their first photoshoot at Creative Park in Ba Son Bridge, as they posed in couture dresses while standing in a swinging 5-meter pole, only having 15 minutes to shoot. The next day, they had a welcome party organized by Parc Mall, before a surprising judging took place in the party. Then Thanh Hằng announced that Ngọc got the best photo, before the remaining contestants had to open their plate dome one by one to receive their results. The ones who received the pink chocolate remained in the competition, while Diệp, Giang, Lan, My & Ngân received the black chocolate, eliminating them from the competition. The five eliminated models took turn saying their final words, before the judges took a further deliberation on them. As a result, Thanh Hằng decided to give all of them one more chance.: Best photo: Lê Thị Bảo Ngọc; Originally eliminated but saved: Trần Thị Ngọc Diệp, Đỗ Phùng Hương Giang, Lê Mi Lan, Lê Minh Trà My & Vũ Mỹ Ngân; Featured photographer: Mạnh Bi; Special guest: Bùi Nguyệt Nga, Nguyễn Trần Đăng Khoa
104	2	"A long road tests the strength of a horse"	10 August 2025
The models arrived at Vietgangz Horse Club & Glamping for their next photoshoot. Set against a backdrop inspired by the style of Western cinema, with bright sunlight, cowboy costumes, and horses, the contestants were required to embody elements of cowboy culture in their poses. Interacting with horses demanded confidence, while each look, gesture, and movement had to be carefully controlled to create images that reflected the theme of "Glam Cowgirls". For winning the best photo last week, Ngọc gets to pose with the best horse in this photoshoot and learn how to work with it, along with the chance to take away 5-minute shooting time from Băng. At the deliberation panel, An got the best photo of the week while Hằng, Hoa, Lan & Thương landed in bottom four. Host Thanh Hằng then asked the eleven safe contestants to vote for two models they believed should be eliminated. Hằng & Hoa received the fewest votes, which granted them another chance. After further deliberation, the results were revealed through stage lighting, with Lan receiving the final (14th) photo of the week, eliminating Thương as she has to return to the model house to pack her bags and leave the competition.: Best photo: Phạm Hoài An; Bottom four: Ngô Thị Hằng, Lại Mai Hoa, Lê Mi Lan & Trương Thị Huyền Thương; Eliminated: Trương Thị Huyền Thương; Featured photographer: Mạnh Bi
105	3	"Elegant strut with Chanté"	17 August 2025
The remaining girls have a catwalk training with Thanh Hằng, before each of them pair up for 3 rounds of catwalk challenges consist of a dual walk, a 3-minute chereograph walk and catwalk in gowns design by Đỗ Mạnh Cường. Mai won the challenge and receive a shopping spree at Parc Mall worth 10.000.000đ and get to share with others as they will get a bonus for the trip. The next day, the girls face up a fashion show for designer Hoàng Minh Hà in an obstacle catwalk consist of stairs, swirls, high podiums and a pebbles road, and they will have to perform both individual and in pairs on a conjoined outfit in front of a live audience. They then randomly pair up before An got the chance to switch partners for winning the best photo last week. At the deliberation panel with guest judge Trang Lê, Giang got the best performance of the week while An, Băng, Thanh T. & Uyên landed in bottom four. After further deliberation, the results were revealed through stage lighting, with Băng & Uyên received the spotlight and remains, eliminating An & Thanh T. in a double elimination.: Challenge winner: Trương Thị Tuyết Mai; Best photo: Đỗ Phùng Hương Giang; Bottom four: Phạm Hoài An, Lê Ngọc Ái Băng, Trần Tâm Thanh & Đỗ Thu Uyên; Eliminated: Phạm Hoài An & Trần Tâm Thanh; Featured photographer: Katsu Phương; Special guest: Hoàng Minh Hà
106	4	"The era of rising"	24 August 2025
The remaining girls learn how to release their bodies through a dance lesson with chereographer Huỳnh Mến, before each of them pair up for 3 rounds of dance challenge in different music and My won the challenge, received a manicure voucher worth 3.000.000đ. After the dances, Thanh Hằng come up to present them a photoshoot challenge with virtual effects, as their will pose on a steeping platform with a white backdrop and 3D artist Trần Đại will edit the photo result as they are rising up on top of a building. My once again take the victory of this challenge, before Thanh Hằng told the girls to pack their bags as they are heading to Phan Thiết. Upon arriving, the girls enjoy an fun adventure day at Bau Trang U&Me. The next day, they arrived at Trinh Nữ sand dune for their next photoshoot as prideful woman in red gown, while posing with a flowing red fabric hanging on the steel frame. For winning the best photo last week, Giang gets to re-order her turn to shoot and the chance to take away 5-minute shooting time from Ngọc. At the deliberation panel back in Ho Chi Minh city, Lan rise up and won the best photo of the week while Hằng & Uyên landed in bottom two and the stage lighting result reveal the spotlight in no one, eliminating both Hằng & Uyên in a shocking double elimination.: First & Second challenge winner: Lê Minh Trà My; Best photo: Lê Mi Lan; Bottom two: Ngô Thị Hằng & Đỗ Thu Uyên; Eliminated: Ngô Thị Hằng & Đỗ Thu Uyên; Featured photographer: Vương Huy; Special guest: Huỳnh Mến, Trần Đại
107	5	"Proud to be Vietnamese model"	31 August 2025
The top 10 got a lesson on how to control facial expressions with vocals from singer Võ Hạ Trâm. Then, they were up for a challenge to lip-sync a part of Trâm's song which they were judged on their expressions and upper body movement, and My once again take the victory of this challenge. Back at the house, they were ecstatic to know they will pack their bags and fly to Hanoi. As Vietnam was celebrating its 80th National Day on September 2, the girls were met by CEO Trang Lê and fashion designer Đức Hùng at Ba Đình Square for the next challenge where they were challenged not only in their professional skills but also in their responsibility as young people in spreading love for their homeland and country. They are divided into 3 teams and their task is to film a short video of maximum 3 minutes, telling the story of Vietnamese youth in the new era.: Team A: Lan, Giang and Diệp; Team B: Hoa, Ngọc and Thanh D.; Team C: Băng, My, Mai and Ngân; At the deliberation panel back in Ho Chi Minh city with guest judges Trang Lê and Đức Hùng, Hoa stand out with her story about her grandmother and won the best performance of the week while Diệp, Giang & Lan landed in bottom three due to lacks of teamwork. Diệp got another chance and the stage lighting result reveal the spotlight in no one, as both Giang & Lan will be leaving the competition. In the surprise twist, Thanh Hằng declared that this episode is about celebrating the joy and decided to give both Giang & Lan one more chance.: Challenge winner: Lê Minh Trà My; Best photo: Lại Mai Hoa; Bottom three: Trần Thị Ngọc Diệp, Đỗ Phùng Hương Giang & Lê Mi Lan; Originally eliminated but saved: Đỗ Phùng Hương Giang & Lê Mi Lan; Special guest: Võ Hạ Trâm, Trang Lê, Đức Hùng, Lan Hương
108	6	"Underwater photoshoot "Blue Ballad""	7 September 2025
The remaining girls arrive to a swimming pool for their next photoshoot with the theme "Blue Ballad", as they will pose inside a giant hoop underwater. But before the shoot, they have a training with diver coach Thủy Phan on how to hold their breath properly under water. At the deliberation panel, another twist has been made as each of them will be presented with 3 of their best shots and they have to choose which one is their best photo to presented. As the result, My rise above the others and won the best photo of the week while Diệp & Thanh D. landed in bottom two and the stage lighting result reveal the spotlight in no one, eliminating both Diệp & Thanh D. in a shocking double elimination.: Best photo: Lê Minh Trà My; Bottom two: Trần Thị Ngọc Diệp & Dương Kim Thanh; Eliminated: Trần Thị Ngọc Diệp & Dương Kim Thanh; Featured photographer: Vương Huy; Special guest: Thủy Phan
109	7	"Mid-autumn concept return "The Veil of Moonlight""	14 September 2025
Former contestants of season 8 Nguyễn Thùy Dương & Cao Thị Thiên Trang arrived to help the remaining girls showing their personalities in photoshoot, before they were split into 2 teams with each member of the team will pair up for a duel posing challenge on high poles and judge Do Manh Cuong will decided who did the best. As the result, the challenge end up in a tie which he decided all of them won the challenge and receive a shopping voucher at DMC Fashion worth 20.000.000đ in total, with My & Ngọc received an extra voucher worth 10.000.000đ each as the strongest pair in the challenge. The next day, they met the judges and ecstatic when Thanh Hằng announced that the 3 finalists of this season will going to Paris. The girls then have their next photoshoot transform into high fashion lion dancer while posing with a Chinese guardian lions head on high poles. For winning the best photo last week, My gets to re-order her turn to shoot and the chance to take away 5-minute shooting time from Lan. Before the photoshoot, Thanh Hằng announced that the 3 girls who make it to the final will be heading to Paris. At the deliberation panel, each of them will be presented with 3 of their best shots and they have to choose which one is their best photo to presented. As the result, Ngân surprise everyone and won the best photo of the week while Băng & Lan landed in bottom two and the results were revealed through stage lighting, with Băng receiving the spotlight and remain in the competition. However, she shocked everyone by announcing she want to quit the competition to focus on her study and her own path which led to a confrontation between her and the judges along with CEO Trang Lê. In the end, Băng stand with her choice and give Lan another chance to remain.: Challenge winner: All 8 girls (with Lê Minh Trà My & Lê Thị Bảo Ngọc as the best pair); Best photo: Vũ Mỹ Ngân; Bottom two: Lê Ngọc Ái Băng & Lê Mi Lan; Quit: Lê Ngọc Ái Băng; Originally eliminated but saved: Lê Mi Lan; Featured photographer: Milor Trần; Special guest: Nguyễn Thùy Dương, Cao Thị Thiên Trang, Katsu Phương, Trang Lê
110	8	"Dance of a Muse"	21 September 2025
CEO Trang Lê met the remaining girls to remind them to step up their games as the finale approached, before learning how to release their bodies through dancing from dancer Hoàng Mỹ An. After the lesson, they have a photoshoot challenge with a male dancer which result in Hoa win the challenge and receive a shopping voucher worth 10.000.000đ. The next day, the girls one by one received advices from Mỹ An, before having their next photoshoot in the set of 1920-1930s dance stage as they will transform into elegant vintage party women dancing with 1 of the 4 male models who pose as musicians. For winning the best photo last week, Ngân gets to re-order her turn to shoot and the chance to take away 5-minute shooting time from Mai. At the deliberation panel with guest judge Trang Lê, each of them will be presented with 3 of their best shots and they have to choose which one is their best photo to presented. As the result, Hoa charm the judges and won the best photo of the week while Lan & Ngân landed in bottom two and the results were revealed through stage lighting, with Ngân receiving the spotlight and the final (6th) photo of the week, eliminating Lan as she has to return to the model house to pack her bags and leave the competition.: Challenge winner: Lại Mai Hoa; Best photo: Lại Mai Hoa; Bottom two: Lê Mi Lan & Vũ Mỹ Ngân; Eliminated: Lê Mi Lan; Featured photographer: Milor Trần; Special guest: Trang Lê, Hoàng Mỹ An, Katsu Phương, Trần Anh Kiệt, Tạ Công Phát, Trần Hoàng Sơn, Nguyễn Hồng Sơn
111	9	"Energetic Chanté - Elegant even when you work out"	28 September 2025
The remaining girls have a lesson about the art of public speaking from 3 MCs Tùng Leo, Nguyễn Phong Linh & Phạm Quý Linh. In an unaired scene, the girls have a speaking challenge which result in Mai & My won the challenge and receive a gift from Nói Academy. Back at the model house, they have a workshop of flower arrangement lesson from Tao Florist's founder Phúng Nguyễn. The next day, the girls have a videoshoot for the new product of Chanté detergent in pairs with the help from former contestants of season 6's winner Nguyễn Thị Hương Ly and season 8 runner-up Nguyễn Thùy Dương, as they will act in the pickleball field and finish at the pink carpet with paparazzi around them. For winning the best photo last week, Hoa gets to re-order her turn to shoot and get to choose My to pair up with her, while the remaining will pair up randomly. At the deliberation panel with guest judge Trang Lê, Giang & Ngân show the most enegetic and won the best performance of the week while the remaining landed in bottom and they will face a duel catwalk challenge which each member of the pair will walk with the other. The results were revealed through stage lighting, with all 4 receiving a little spotlight meaning everybody will remain in the competition.: Challenge winner: Lại Mai Hoa & Lê Minh Trà My; Best photo: Đỗ Phùng Hương Giang & Vũ Mỹ Ngân; Bottom four: Lại Mai Hoa, Trương Thị Tuyết Mai, Lê Minh Trà My & Lê Thị Bảo Ngọc; Eliminated: None; Special guest: Trang Lê, Tùng Leo, Nguyễn Phong Linh, Phạm Quý Linh, Phúng Nguyễn, Nguyễn Thùy Dương, Nguyễn Thị Hương Ly
112	10	"Who will make it to the fashion capital of Paris?"	8 October 2025
The remaining girls met Thanh Hằng and creative director Khuất Năng Vĩnh for their next photoshoot for Harper's Bazaar, as they will tell the stories of solar eclipse through 3 looks to pose with. At the deliberation panel with guest judges Trang Lê & Trần Nguyễn Thiên Hương, they have an emotional lookback at the entire journey and express their feeling about the experience. As the result, Ngọc has bounced back and won the final best photo of the week, Ngân became the second finalist while Giang, Hoa, Mai & My landed in bottom four and Thanh Hằng announced Hoa is the last finalist, which mean Giang, Mai & My have been eliminated. After the elimination, the final 3 begin their adventure in Paris and have a day of sightseeing upon arrival. The next day, they have a casting with 4 modeling agencies of Women Management, Supreme Management, Ford Models & Elite Model Management and appeared in front of streetstyle paparazzi at Paris Fashion Week. The next day, they arrived at Montmartre to shoot the cover and editorials for Harper's Bazaar.: Best photo: Lê Thị Bảo Ngọc; Bottom four: Đỗ Phùng Hương Giang, Lại Mai Hoa, Trương Thị Tuyết Mai & Lê Minh Trà My; Eliminated: Đỗ Phùng Hương Giang, Trương Thị Tuyết Mai & Lê Minh Trà My; Featured photographer: Nguyễn Du, Luis Monteiro; Special guest: Khuất Năng Vĩnh, Trần Nguyễn Thiên Hương, Lydia Vilanova, Antoine Lim
113	11	"Live Finale"	12 October 2025
Warrior Model: Đỗ Phùng Hương Giang; Final four: Đỗ Phùng Hương Giang, Lại Mai Hoa, Vũ Mỹ Ngân & Lê Thị Bảo Ngọc; Fan Favorite: Đỗ Phùng Hương Giang; Runner-ups: Đỗ Phùng Hương Giang, Vũ Mỹ Ngân & Lê Thị Bảo Ngọc; Vietnam's Next Top Model 2025: Lại Mai Hoa; Featured photographer: "Kiếng Cận" Phạm Phúc Lợi; Special guest: Kay Trần, MLee, Tùng Leo, Thanh Thanh Huyền, Trang Lê, Trần Nguyễn Thiên Hương, Nguyễn Thị Hương Ly, Nguyễn Thị Ngọc Châu, Lê Thị Kim Dung

== Summaries ==
=== Call-out order ===
Hằng's call-out order
Order	Episodes										
Order	1 (Note: In episode 1, the call-out order did not reflect each model's performance. Ngọc got called out first for the best photo.)	2	3	4	5	6	7	8	9	10	11 (Note: In episode 11, Giang was brought back into the competition after winning a fan vote competition online.)
1	Ngọc	An	Giang	Lan	Hoa	My	Ngân	Hoa	Giang; Ngân	Ngọc	Hoa
2	An	Băng	Mai	Giang	Băng	Hoa	Giang	Mai	Giang; Ngân	Ngân	Giang; Ngân; Ngọc
3	Thương	Giang	Ngân	Diệp	Ngọc	Băng	My	Ngọc	Hoa; Mai; My; Ngọc	Hoa	Giang; Ngân; Ngọc
4	Thanh T.	Mai	Hoa	Băng	Mai	Lan	Mai	My	Hoa; Mai; My; Ngọc	Giang; Mai; My	Giang; Ngân; Ngọc
5	Hằng	My	My	Thanh D.	My	Ngọc	Ngọc	Giang	Hoa; Mai; My; Ngọc	Giang; Mai; My	
6	Hoa	Thanh D.	Lan	Ngân	Ngân	Ngân	Hoa	Ngân	Hoa; Mai; My; Ngọc	Giang; Mai; My	
7	Thanh D.	Ngân	Diệp	Mai	Thanh D.	Giang	Băng	Lan			
8	Mai	Ngọc	Ngọc	Hoa	Diệp	Mai	Lan				
9	Uyên	Thanh T.	Thanh D.	Ngọc	Giang; Lan	Diệp; Thanh D.					
10	Băng	Diệp	Hằng	My	Giang; Lan	Diệp; Thanh D.					
11	Diệp; Giang; Lan; My; Ngân	Uyên	Băng; Uyên	Hằng; Uyên							
12	Diệp; Giang; Lan; My; Ngân	Hoa	Băng; Uyên	Hằng; Uyên							
13	Diệp; Giang; Lan; My; Ngân	Hằng	An; Thanh T.								
14	Diệp; Giang; Lan; My; Ngân	Lan	An; Thanh T.								
15	Diệp; Giang; Lan; My; Ngân	Thương									

The contestant quit the competition
The contestant was part of a non-elimination bottom two
The contestant was eliminated
The contestant was originally eliminated from the competition but was saved
The contestant won the competition

=== Photo shoot guide ===
- Episode 1 photo shoot: Posing in height in couture dresses
- Episode 2 photo shoot: Cowgirls with horses
- Episode 3 runway show: Obstacle catwalk (individual and pair)
- Episode 4 photo shoot: Prideful women in red with flowing fabric
- Episode 5 video shoot: The beauty and the history of National Day in Hanoi
- Episode 6 photo shoot: Underwater blue ballad
- Episode 7 photo shoot: Lion dancer of Mid-Autumn Festival
- Episode 8 photo shoot: Dance of the muse
- Episode 9 video shoot: Energetic for Chanté Detergent
- Episode 10 photo shoots: Solar eclipse editorials for Harper's Bazaar; Harper's Bazaar cover and editorials in Paris
- Episode 11 photo shoot: Roses in glass cloche
