= Nguyễn Thị Hương Ly =

Vietnamese model and beauty pageant titleholder (born 1995)

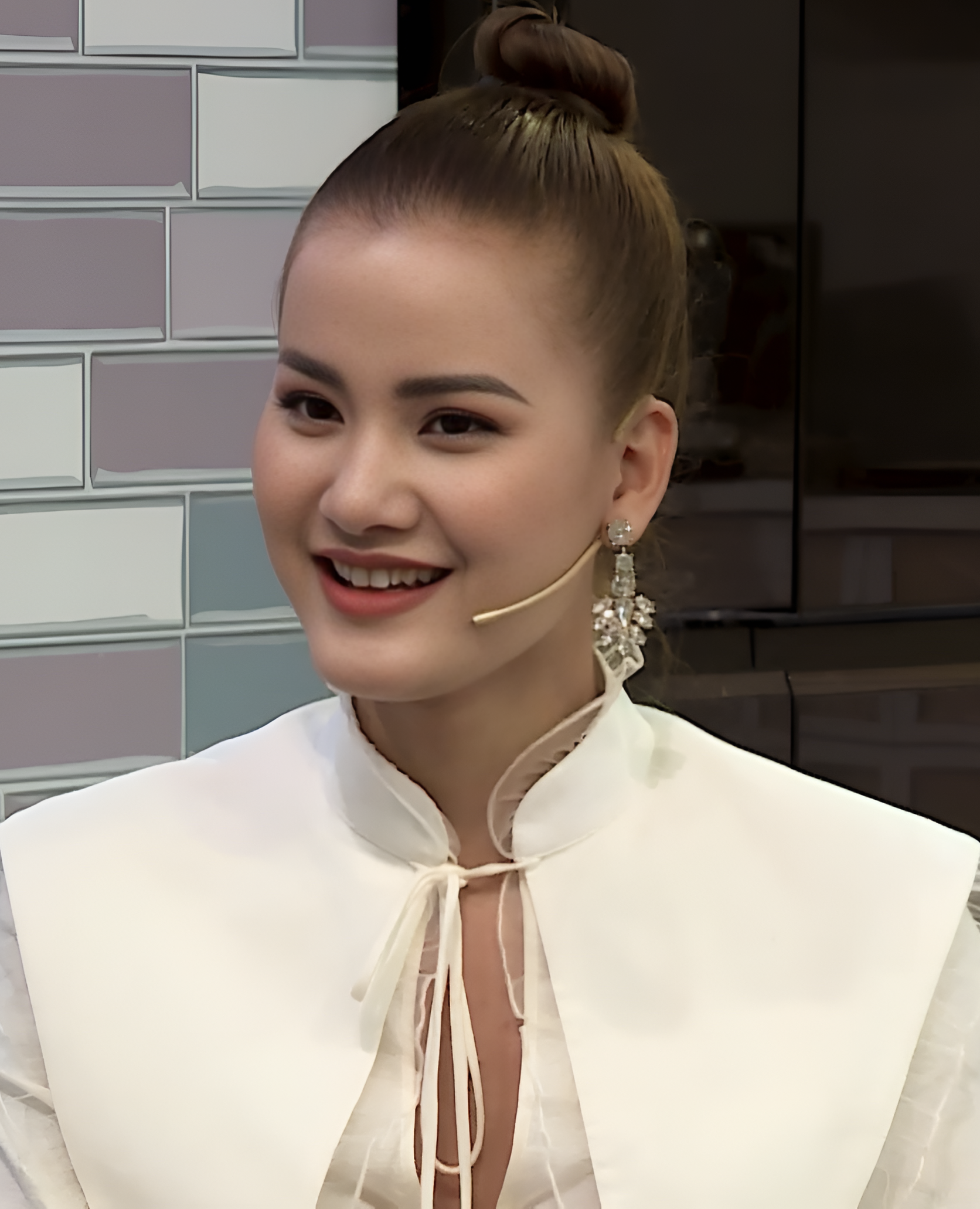
- Ly in 2020
- Born: December 9, 1995 (age 30); Gia Lai, Vietnam
- Education: Saigon Technology University
- Title: Vietnam's Next Top Model 2015; 1st Runner-up Miss Universe Vietnam 2023
- Modeling information
- Height: 173 cm (5 ft 8 in)
- Hair color: Black
- Eye color: Black

Nguyễn Thị Hương Ly (born December 9, 1995) is a Vietnamese model and beauty pageant titleholder. She was the winner of Vietnam's Next Top Model season 6 and was the first runner-up of Miss Universe Vietnam 2023.

== Career ==
Nguyễn Thị Hương Ly was born on December 9, 1995, in Gia Lai. She won Vietnam's Next Top Model season 6 in 2015.

In 2017, she entered Miss Universe Vietnam 2017, but withdrew due to health reasons. In 2019, she entered Miss Universe Vietnam 2019 and reached the top five. In 2022, she entered Miss Universe Vietnam 2022 and again reached the top five. In 2023, she entered Miss Universe Vietnam 2023 and was first runner-up.

In 2019, she was a coach of Model Kid Vietnam 2019. In 2020 and 2021, she was a judge at Aquafina Fashion Week.

== TV show ==
Year	Program	Role	Broadcast on	References
2015	Vietnam's Next Top Model season 6	Candidates	VTV3	
2016	Bữa trưa vui vẻ	Guest	VTV6	
2017	Vietnam's Next Top Model season 7	Guest judge episode 9	VTV3	
2017	Bữa trưa vui vẻ	Guest	VTV6	
2018	Vietnam's Next Top Model season 8	Guest episode 1	VTV3	
2019	Model Kid Vietnam	Mentor	BeU Channel	Winner team
2019	Miss Universe Vietnam 2019	Candidates	VTV9	Top 5
2020	Vietnam Why Not	Player	VTV9	
2020	Million Dollar Minute: Vietnam	Player	VTV3	
2020	Future Designer Kids	Judge	VTV9	
2020	Aquafina Fashion Week	Judge	BeU Channel	
2022	Miss Universe Vietnam 2022	Candidates	VTV9	Top 5
2022	Thank God You're Here: Vietnam season 8	Player	VTV3	
2023	Miss Universe Vietnam 2023	Candidates	VTV9	1st Runner-Up
2024	The Next Gentleman	Mentor	YouTube	Winner team
2024	Vietnam Miss University 2024	Mentor	YouTube	Winner team
2025	Vietnam's Next Top Model season 9	Guest judge casting	YouTube	
2025	Vietnam Miss University 2025	Mentor	YouTube	

Awards and achievements
Preceded by Nguyễn Thị Oanh	Vietnam's Next Top Model; 2015	Succeeded by Nguyễn Thị Ngọc Châu
Preceded by Lê Thảo Nhi	1st Runner-Up Miss Universe Vietnam; 2023	Succeeded by Nguyễn Quỳnh Anh
