= Vietnam's Next Top Model season 3 =

Vietnam's Next Top Model
- Season 3

Release
- Original network: VTV3
- Original release: August 19 – November 25, 2012

Season chronology
- ← Previous; Season 2 Next → Season 4

The third season of Vietnam's Next Top Model premiered on August 19, 2012 on VTV3.

Among the prizes was: a 2-year modeling contract with BeU Models worth 1,000,000,000₫ (approximately $50,000), be on the cover in Cosmopolitan magazine along with 200,000,000₫ in cash, a 2-year VIP Diamond Membership card at California Fitness & Yoga Center worth 300,000,000₫. a 1 year gift from Shiseido cosmetic and a short training course in Tokyo sponsored by Shiseido.

The winner was 20-year-old Mai Thị Giang from Hải Phòng.

== Overview ==
=== Auditions ===
Audition City	Date	Venue
Ho Chi Minh City	June 7, 2012	Grand Palace
Hanoi	June 17, 2012	The Garden Shopping Center

== Contestants ==
Contestant	Age	Height	Hometown	Finish	Place
Nguyễn Thị Châm	19	1.81 m (5 ft 11 1/2 in)	Quảng Ninh	Episode 4	15
Nguyễn Thị Hằng	20	1.73 m (5 ft 8 in)	Phú Thọ	Episode 5	14
Lương Thị Kim Loan	22	1.71 m (5 ft 7 1/2 in)	An Giang	Episode 6	13
Cao Thị Hà	20	1.77 m (5 ft 9 1/2 in)	Hà Nội	Episode 7	12-11
Lê Thị Hằng	19	1.81 m (5 ft 11 1/2 in)	Vĩnh Phúc	Episode 7	12-11
Lê Thanh Thảo	19	1.74 m (5 ft 8 1/2 in)	Vĩnh Long	Episode 8	10
Đỗ Thu Hà	19	1.75 m (5 ft 9 in)	Hà Nội	Episode 9	9
Vũ Thị Minh Nguyệt	17	1.78 m (5 ft 10 in)	Hà Nam	Episode 10	8
Nguyễn Thị Ngân	22	1.80 m (5 ft 11 in)	Hà Nội	Episode 14	7-4
Dương Thị Thanh	21	1.77 m (5 ft 9 1/2 in)	Thái Nguyên	Episode 14	7-4
Nguyễn Thị Ngọc Thúy	21	1.81 m (5 ft 11 1/2 in)	TP.HCM	Episode 14	7-4
Nguyễn Thị Nhã Trúc	23	1.72 m (5 ft 7 1/2 in)	Long An	Episode 14	7-4
Cao Thị Thiên Trang	19	1.75 m (5 ft 9 in)	TP.HCM	Episode 15	3
Kha Mỹ Vân	22	1.77 m (5 ft 9 1/2 in)	TP.HCM	Episode 15	2
Mai Thị Giang	20	1.76 m (5 ft 9 1/2 in)	Hải Phòng	Episode 15	1

== Judges ==
- Xuân Lan (Host)
- Đinh Nam Trung
- Đỗ Mạnh Cường
- Phạm Hoài Nam

== Episodes ==
=== Episode 1 ===
Original Airdate: August 19, 2012

The judges selected the best 31 contestants from hundreds of girls to step into the journey of becoming Vietnam's Next Top Model.

- Advanced to the semi-final: Nguyễn Thị Thuý, Lê Thanh Thảo, Trần Nguyễn Phương Uyên, Huỳnh Thị Linh Ngân, Nguyễn Thị Kiều Ngân, Nguyễn Thị Nhã Trúc, Tôn Nữ Minh Thi, Cao Thị Thiên Trang, Lương Thị Kim Loan, Nguyễn Thị Ngọc Thuý, Hồng Nguyên Phụng, Kha Mỹ Vân, Nguyễn Thị Ngần, Vũ Thị Minh Nguyệt, Vũ Xuân Nhung, Vũ Huyền Trang, Nguyễn Thị Vân, Bùi Thuỳ Dương, Dương Thị Thanh, Đỗ Thu Hà, Lê Thị Thuỳ Trang, Lê Thị Hằng, Mai Thị Giang, Cao Thị Hà, Nguyễn Thị Vinh, Nguyễn Thị Hằng, Trần Thị Hồng Tâm, Nguyễn Thị Hà, Trần Hải Yến, Nguyễn Thị Châm, Nguyễn Thị Ngân.

=== Episode 2 ===
Original Airdate: 26 August 2012

- Challenge Winner: Nguyễn Thị Ngần, Mai Thị Giang
- Withdraw: Nguyễn Thị Ngần
- Eliminated: None

=== Episode 3 ===
Original Aridate: September 2, 2012

- Challenge Winner: Mai Giang, Nguyễn Thị Ngân
- Featured Designer: Do Manh Cuong
- Eliminated: Nguyen Thi Thuy, Tran Nguyen Phuong Quyen, Huynh Thi Linh Ngan, Nguyen Thi Kieu Van, Ton Nu Minh Thi, Hong Nguyen Phung, Vu Xuan Nhung, Vu Huyen Trang, Nguyen Thi Van, Bui Thuy Duong, Le Thi Thuy, Nguyen Thi Vinh, Tran Thi Hong Tam, Nguyen Thi Ha, Tran Hai Yen

=== Episode 4 ===
Original Airdate: September 9, 2012

- Challenge Winner: Nha Truc
- First Call-out: Mai Giang
- Bottom Two: Thu Ha, Nguyen Cham
- Eliminated: Nguyen Cham
- Featured Photographer: An Le
- Featured Designer: Do Manh Cuong

=== Episode 5 ===
Original Airdate: September 16, 2012

- Challenge Winner: Kim Loan
- First Call-out: Thanh Thao
- Bottom Two: My Van, Nguyen Hang
- Eliminated: Nguyen Hang
- Featured Designer: Do Manh Cuong

=== Episode 6 ===
Original Airdate: September 23, 2012

- First Call-Out: Thanh Thao
- Bottom Two: Kim Loan, Le Hang
- Eliminated: Kim Loan
- Featured Designer: Do Manh Cuong, Truong Thanh Long

=== Episode 7 ===
Original Airdate: September 30, 2012

For the weekly photo challenge, the girls were divided into 4 groups and rotate as a girl lead singer and will do the remaining two friends behind, same pose for 1 minute on the band "One Night Only"

Group	Contestants
1	Thanh Thảo, Thu Hà, Ngọc Thúy
2	Minh Nguyệt, Nhã Trúc, Nguyễn Ngân
3	Lê Hằng, Dương Thanh, Thiên Trang
4	Mỹ Vân, Mai Giang, Cao Hà

- First Call-Out: My Van
- Bottom Three: Thanh Thao, Le Hang, Cao Ha
- Eliminated: Le Hang, Cao Ha
- Featured Designer: Kim Khanh, Le Thanh Hoa

=== Episode 8 ===
Original Airdate: October 7, 2012

- First Call-Out: Thanh
- Bottom Two: Thanh Thao, Duong Thanh
- Eliminated: Thanh Thao
- Featured Designer: Le Kha

=== Episode 9 ===
Original Airdate: October 14, 2012

- First Call-Out: Thiên Trang
- Bottom Two: Nhã Trúc, Đỗ Hà
- Eliminated: Đỗ Hà
- Featured Designer: Mai Lâm, Đỗ Mạnh Cường

=== Episode 10 ===
Original Airdate: October 21, 2012

- First Call-Out: Ngoc Thuy
- Bottom Two: Minh Nguyet, Mai Giang
- Eliminated: Minh Nguyet
- Featured Designer: Sabina

=== Episode 11 ===
Original Airdate: October 28, 2012

- First Call-Out: Duong Thanh
- Bottom Two: Ngoc Thuy, Nguyen Ngan
- Eliminated: Nguyen Ngan
- Featured Designer: Rise Above

=== Episode 12 ===
Original Airdate: November 4, 2012

- First Call-Out: Mai Giang
- Bottom Two: Thanh Duong, Thien Trang
- Eliminated: None
- Featured Designer: Kimono

=== Episode 13 ===
Original Airdate: November 11, 2012

The contestants went on a casting trip to New York City for New York Fashion Week Spring-Summer 2013. No one was eliminated in this episode.

- Returned: Nguyen Ngan

=== Episode 14 ===
Original Airdate: November 18, 2012

The episode continued in New York.

- Eliminated: Ngoc Thuy, Ngan Nguyen, Nha Truc, Duong Thanh

=== Final ===
Original Airdate: November 25, 2012

- Final three: Mai Giang, Mỹ Vân & Thiên Trang
- Eliminated: Thien Trang
- Final two: Mỹ Vân & Mai Giang
- Vietnam's Next Top Model 2012: Mai Giang

== Summaries ==
=== Call-out order ===
Order	Episodes												
Order	3	4	5	6	7	8	9	10	11	12	13	14	15
1	Giang	Giang	Thảo	Thảo	Vân	Thanh	Trang	Thúy	Thanh	Giang	Vân	Vân	Giang
2	Trúc	Thanh	Thanh	Nguyệt	Trang	Vân	Nguyệt	Ngân	Trang	Trúc	Trúc	Giang	Vân
3	Thanh	Thúy	Giang	Trang	Thanh	Thúy	Giang	Trang	Vân	Vân	Thúy	Trang	Trang
4	Thảo	Thảo	Trúc	Trúc	Thúy	Ngân	Thanh	Thanh	Giang	Thúy	Trang	Ngân; Thanh; Thúy; Trúc	
5	Trang	Trúc	Thúy	Hà C.	Trúc	Trang	Ngân	Trúc	Trúc	Thanh	Thanh	Ngân; Thanh; Thúy; Trúc	
6	Ngân	Trang	Nguyệt	Ngân	Giang	Nguyệt	Vân	Vân	Thúy	Trang	Giang	Ngân; Thanh; Thúy; Trúc	
7	Vân	Hằng L.	Loan	Thanh	Hà Đ.	Trúc	Thúy	Giang	Ngân		Ngân	Ngân; Thanh; Thúy; Trúc	
8	Thúy	Loan	Hà Đ.	Giang	Ngân	Hà Đ.	Trúc	Nguyệt					
9	Hà C.	Vân	Hằng L.	Hà Đ.	Nguyệt	Giang	Hà Đ.						
10	Loan	Ngân	Ngân	Thúy	Thảo	Thảo							
11	Nguyệt	Nguyệt	Trang	Vân	Hà C. Hằng L.								
12	Hằng N.	Hà C.	Hà C.	Hằng L.	Hà C. Hằng L.								
13	Hà Đ.	Hằng N.	Vân	Loan									
14	Châm	Hà Đ.	Hằng N.										
15	Hằng L.	Châm											

The contestant was eliminated
The contestant was originally eliminated from the competition but was saved
The contestant won the competition

- In episode 12, Trang was originally eliminated from the competition but was saved.
- In episode 13, No one was eliminated. Ngân was brought back into the competition.
- In episode 14, The contestants was called in random order into 2 groups and Giang, Trang & Vân's group was chosen to be in the final. Beside, Mai Giang's photo was considered the best one due to the only photo was chosen by Cosmopolitan Vietnam and published later on the Cosmopolitan issues in December 2012.

=== Average call-out order ===
Rank by average	Place	Model	Call-out total	Number of call-outs	Call-out average
1	3	Trang	50	13	3.85
2	4-7	Thanh	49	12	4.08
3	10	Thảo	27	6	4.50
4	4-7	Thúy	55	12	4.58
5	1	Giang	66	14	4.71
6	4-7	Trúc	57	12	4.75
7	2	Vân	70	14	5.00
8	8	Nguyệt	53	8	6.63
9	4-7	Ngân	78	11	7.09
10	13	Loan	32	4	8.00
11	9	Hà Đ.	62	7	8.86
12	11-12	Hằng L.	48	5	9.60
13	11-12	Hà C.	52	5	10.40
14	15	Châm	25	2	12.50
15	14	Hằng N.	40	3	13.33

=== Photo shoot Guide ===
- Episode 1 Photo Shoot: Promo Shoots (casting)
- Episode 2 Photo Shoot: "White Summer" Editorial By The Lake (casting)
- Episode 3 Photo Shoot: Futuristic Shots (casting)
- Episode 4 Photo Shoot: Beauty Shots With Cats
- Episode 5 Photo Shoot: Good Morning
- Episode 6 Photo Shoot: Editorial With Snakes
- Episode 7 Photo Shoot: Divas Night In Groups
- Episode 8 Photo Shoot: Fighters On a Ring
- Episode 9 Photo Shoot: Vietnamese Souls
- Episode 10 Photo Shoot: Pin-Up Girls
- Episode 11 Photo Shoot: Posing Over The Vietnamese Skyline
- Episode 12 Commercial: Shiseido cosmetic in geisha outfit
- Episode 13 Photo Shoot: Blowing In New York
- Episode 14 Photo Shoot: Editorials for Cosmopolitan
- Episode 15 Photo Shoots: Cosmopolitan Cover; Diva on the ring
