= Vietnam's Next Top Model season 7 =

Vietnam's Next Top Model
- Season 7

Release
- Original network: Multimedia JSC (domestically); VTV (domestically); CBS Television Distribution (internationally)
- Original release: July 17 – October 2, 2016

Season chronology
- ← Previous; Cycle 6 Next → Cycle 8

Vietnam's Next Top Model, Cycle 7 is the seventh season of Vietnam's Next Top Model. It premiered on July 17, 2016 on VTV3. For the fourth time, males were still featured as part of the show. This year, host Phạm Thị Thanh Hằng and Samuel Hoàng reprised their roles in the judging panel. Fashion designer Lý Quí Khánh and fashion stylist & Editor-in-Chief of Đẹp Magazine Hà Đỗ were introduced as new judges. This season's theme is: "Break The Rules: #PhaBoMoiGioiHan".

The winner was 22 year-old Nguyễn Thị Ngọc Châu from Tây Ninh.

== Overview ==
=== Requirements ===
All applying contestants for the show had to meet the following requirements:

- Young men and women had to be Vietnamese citizens or foreigners of Vietnamese origin.
- Over the age of 18.
- Not be managed exclusively by companies, agencies, or products.
- Have no criminal record

=== Auditions ===
Audition City	Date	Venue
Hà Nội	May 24, 2016	The Garden Shopping Center
Đà Nẵng	May 27, 2016	Eden Plaza 5
Hồ Chí Minh City	May 31, 2016	Grand Palace

=== Prizes ===
The winner will receive the following prizes are:

- A 2-year modelling contract with BeU Models
- A cover spread of Harper's Bazaar Vietnam magazine
- A 1-year contract with IVYmoda worth VND 500 million
- A contract with Hanvico My Youth furniture cover collection worth VND 100 million
- A 1-year membership worth VND 200 million courtesy of Elite Fitness & Spa
- VND 100 million worth of PNJ Jewelry
- VND 100 million worth of package by Pho Xinh furniture
- Will be opening at Vietnam International Fashion week on November 1–6, 2016 at Hanoi

=== Next Top Model Online ===
Similar to the last cycle, the organizers of the show began a contest named Next Top Model Online on Kenh14.vn. After the contest, the contestant with the highest number of votes will be allowed to advance to the model house. As a result, that was shown in this cycle's first episode, BB&BG actress and Social Media Personality Vu Tran Kim Nha from Ho Chi Minh City, who was 26 years old (as the oldest of all contestants in this cycle) was advanced to the bikini round leading her advancement to the selection of Top 24 semifinalists from the pool of auditionees, both online & casting venues.

== Contestants ==
Contestant	Age	Height	Hometown	Finish	Place
Nguyễn Thị Thùy Dung	22	1.76 m (5 ft 9 1/2 in)	Bắc Ninh	Episode 2	18-17
Phạm Gia Long	18	1.77 m (5 ft 9 1/2 in)	Hà Nội	Episode 2	18-17
Nguyễn Duy Minh	19	1.79 m (5 ft 10 1/2 in)	Hà Nội	Episode 4	16-14
Trương Bùi Hoài Nam	21	1.72 m (5 ft 7 1/2 in)	Thanh Hoá	Episode 4	16-14
Hà Thị Út Trang	20	1.73 m (5 ft 8 in)	Quảng Nam	Episode 4	16-14
Nguyễn Anh Thư	22	1.79 m (5 ft 10 1/2 in)	Long An	Episode 6	13
Hoàng Minh Tùng	24	1.80 m (5 ft 11 in)	Lạng Sơn	Episode 7	12
Bùi Huy Dương	20	1.90 m (6 ft 3 in)	Hà Nội	Episode 8	11-10
Nguyễn Thị Phương	19	1.72 m (5 ft 7 1/2 in)	Hà Nội	Episode 8	11-10
Vũ Trần Kim Nhã	26	1.70 m (5 ft 7 in)	Hồ Chí Minh City	Episode 9	9
Trần Thị Thùy Trâm	20	1.68 m (5 ft 6 in)	Quảng Nam	Episode 10	8
Trịnh Thu Hường	21	1.75 m (5 ft 9 in)	Hà Nội	Episode 11	7-6
Nguyễn Thiếu Lan	19	1.71 m (5 ft 7 1/2 in)	Đồng Nai	Episode 11	7-6
Nguyễn Minh Phong	23	1.86 m (6 ft 1 in)	Tiền Giang	Episode 12	5-4
Trần Thị Thùy Trang	19	1.77 m (5 ft 9 1/2 in)	Hà Nội	Episode 12	5-4
Nguyễn Huy Quang	20	1.88 m (6 ft 2 in)	Hải Dương	Episode 12	3-2
La Thanh Thanh	23	1.54 m (5 ft 1/2 in)	Bình Dương	Episode 12	3-2
Nguyễn Thị Ngọc Châu	21	1.74 m (5 ft 8 1/2 in)	Tây Ninh	Episode 12	1

== Episodes ==
=== Episode 1 ===
Original Airdate: July 17, 2016

This was the casting episode. It shows that many people who really wanted to aspire to become Vietnam's Next Top Model. The judges have their different reactions when it comes to modelling skills and talents of many aspirants. After three rounds of catwalk in swimsuit, photoshoot and interview with the judges, only twenty-four out of multitudes of aspirants across Vietnam are chosen to the final challenge.

The next day, the 24 semifinalists arrive at a cargo port for a runway challenge above the air, while holding a tray of water glass. In the end, only eighteen are chosen as the finalists of this cycle. These aspirants are selected in no particular order by performance level that they achieved.

- Advanced: Bùi Huy Dương, Phạm Gia Long, Hoàng Minh Tùng, Nguyễn Duy Minh, Nguyễn Huy Quang, Nguyễn Minh Phong, Trương Bùi Hoài Nam, Trần Thị Thùy Trâm, Trần Thị Thùy Trang, Hà Thị Út Trang, Vũ Trần Kim Nhã, Nguyễn Thị Thùy Dung, Nguyễn Thị Phương, La Thanh Thanh, Nguyễn Anh Thư, Nguyễn Thiếu Lan, Nguyễn Thị Ngọc Châu & Trịnh Thu Hường

=== Episode 2 ===
Original Airdate: July 24, 2016

After selecting the 18 appointed finalists after the casting episode, the finalists moved into Phu Long Dragon Hills Suites & Residences, which was used in cycle 6. The next day, the boys & girls were shocked to know that they will have a makeover. Back at the model suites, tension rises between Thanh & Trâm during the house meeting.

At the photo shoot, the saw a ceiling-suspended 3-dimensional pyramid or cube that was made of circular tube bars which are assembled as one & they used this as a gymnastic exhibition. Some of them could adapt to learn new things while a lot of them struggled, especially for Dung & Long who performed the worst leading to their elimination. But except for one of them, Thanh impressed the judges the most, despite being the shortest among the contestants. At the end of the episode, Long & Dung bid goodbye to the 16 remaining contestants, packed their bags & left the competition.

The next day, judge Lý Quí Khánh came to the model suites to hand out their photos, before announce who has won the best photo and Thanh is the one who got the best photo of the week.

- Best photo: La Thanh Thanh
- Eliminated outside of judging panel: Phạm Gia Long & Nguyễn Thị Thùy Dung
- Featured Photographer: Mạnh Bi

=== Episode 3 ===
Original Airdate: July 31, 2016

On the next day, they saw the flatscreen TV displaying Thanh Thanh's image for her best performance & "Thank You" messages from Long & Dung that lead them to emotional cry when they bid farewell.

At the photo shoot, they split up into 8 pairs which consist of a combination of a man and a woman or an all-female or all-male combination. Only 6 pairs made up of man & woman partnership as couples while the 2 pairs made up of all-female best friends.

At the deliberation panel, Phương, Nam, Dương, Tùng, Châu, Phong, Quang & Thanh impressed the judges for showing up their best creative shots by their inventive poses, especially Phuong, who garnered the best photo of the week for her strong performance with Nam, who is behind her, gains a runner-up photo of this week. The 6 women, Hường, Lan, Trang T., Nhã, Trang H. & Thư received a "just right" feedback because they have some uncertain factors that they need to improve well. Minh & Trâm performed the worst in the photo shoot because they thought way too much with several uncertain factors that brought them to bottom two. At the end of deliberation, Minh received the last photo, before the host announced that it was a non-elimination episode thus save Trâm from elimination.

- Challenge winner: Nguyễn Thị Phương & Trương Bùi Hoài Nam
- Best photo: Nguyễn Thị Phương
- Bottom three: Nguyễn Duy Minh, Nguyễn Anh Thư & Trần Thị Thùy Trâm
- Originally eliminated but saved: Trần Thị Thùy Trâm
- Featured Photographer: Samuel Hoàng

=== Episode 4 ===
Original Airdate: August 7, 2016

Inside the model suite, everyone cheered for joy because none of them left the competition, especially Trâm who cries for joy.

At the photo shoot, they have to wear something colorful for their cool, cute & playful concepts especially for the red-and-white vertical wall stripes with a hot air balloon on it. They all have to look quirky when they jumped on the trampoline to show off their clothes with flying colors.

At the deliberation panel, half of them impressed the judges, Quang gets the best photo of the week and Trâm on her rapidly massive improvements by getting a runner-up photo. The next four persons including Nhã who was included in the bottom five got fair comments from the judges. While Thư, Minh, Nam & Trang H. have lots of factors that they lacked in improvement leading themselves to bottom five with Nhã. Thanh Hằng announced that there would be a triple elimination this week. Nhã was called first, while Thư received the 13th and last photo of this week. Eliminating Minh, Nam & Trang H., they returned to the model house to pack their bags and left the competition.

- Best photo: Nguyễn Huy Quang
- Bottom five: Vũ Trần Kim Nhã, Nguyễn Anh Thư, Nguyễn Duy Minh, Trương Bùi Hoài Nam & Hà Thị Út Trang
- Eliminated: Nguyễn Duy Minh, Trương Bùi Hoài Nam & Hà Thị Út Trang
- Featured Photographer: Phan Võ

=== Episode 5 ===
Original Airdate: August 14, 2016

Back in the model suite where Minh, Nam & Trang H. composed their messages in order to pack their bags and leave before the 13 remaining contestants arrive. Shortly followed by the arrival of the 13 contestants to the model house where the Thank You messages composed by Minh, Nam & Trang H. were displayed on the screen that brought their emotions to tears, especially Lan's because she loved Minh the most. After a couple of minutes, Quang's best photo was displayed on the screen.

There were some mishaps happening in the model house. At night after the triple elimination, Lan fainted due to her emotional breakdown by Minh's elimination and went to the hospital along with few of her co-models who assisted her. Lan confirmed that she'd dropout of this week's photo shoot for her to take rest. The next morning, Trâm complains a lot with anger and tears. And she thought that Nhã was annoying her. Trâm burst out her emotions where one of her closest friends, Lan, who is in the hospital which made herself an introvert.

At the photo shoot, the activity of this photo shoot is to showcase their high fashion dresses underwater for their ethereal experience. Some of them enjoyed it and they could invent the poses whatever they want, some of them could swim while others were struggling, especially Hường whose performance is very hard to find what factor can be the key to her improvement.

At the deliberation panel, Nhã climbs her way up with 11 notches by her exceptionally ethereal aura, leading her to this week's best-photo victory. Thanh, Quang, Dương, Châu, Phương & Tùng impressed the judges easily, especially Thanh who gained the runner-up photo despite her short height to face her fears in the underwater world. Phong, Trang T., Thư & Trâm got fair comments because they fared well for their performances for them not to be pruned in the elimination, while Lan (who is in a temporary dropout) & Hường (is the one who) struggled the most, found themselves in the bottom two. But when Thanh Hằng reveals the 12th and final best photo, both of them are safe. If the two persons at the bottom group are both saved by revealing the last photo, Non-elimination bottom group happens.

- Challenge winner: Trần Thị Thuỳ Trâm & Nguyễn Thị Ngọc Châu
- Best photo: Vũ Trần Kim Nhã
- Non-elimination Bottom Two: Trịnh Thu Hường & Nguyễn Thiếu Lan
- Featured Photographer: Samuel Hoàng, Lee Nguyễn
- Guest Judge:

=== Episode 6 ===
Original Airdate: August 21, 2016

Inside the model suite, everyone felt their joy of victory when Lan & Huong are both saved in the elimination. The next day, they have to show their entrepreneurial skills when they sell fruits, vegetables & flowers.

In the challenge, 13 contestants received a voice-over call from a customer in order to buy something from them. When he speaks fluent English, Phương (together with Nhã) & Thanh (together with Hường) showed up their English-speaking abilities while others are in Vietnamese Language. In the end, Phương & Nhã won a special reward, a dinner for two at the hotel.

At the photo shoot, they went to circus in order to pose at the hanging ladder together with a metal hoop that is blazed with fire to determine how courageous they are when they face their fear of heights. Trâm cried a lot when there can be some uncertainties pushing to her, but she risked it all leaving to another runner-up photo victory behind Quang (who gains a second best photo because of his good variety of looks portrayed on each photo shoot). Behind Quang & Trâm, Phương, Phong, Nhã, Hường, Thanh, Châu, Dương and Tùng followed. Lan, Trang T. & Thư fell down in the bottom 3, Thanh Hằng saw all 3 of them if they are determined to be in the running for the next challenge and photo shoot. But in the end, Lan & Trang T. completed the top 12 spots, leaving Thư as the 6th contestant to be eliminated.

- Challenge winner: Nguyễn Thị Phương
- Best photo: Nguyễn Huy Quang
- Bottom three: Nguyễn Thị Thiếu Lan, Nguyễn Anh Thư & Trần Thị Thùy Trang
- Eliminated: Nguyễn Anh Thư
- Featured photographer: Minduke
- Guest judge: Phạm Hồng Thúy Vân

=== Episode 7 ===
Original Airdate: August 28, 2016

In the morning, everybody is well prepared for the challenge. It's just like the format of Amazing Race where different pitstops were assigned. But in a Top Model-twist, each pitstop gives time for them to decide what clothing and accessory they want to wear.

For the commercial shoot, PNJ is the official jewellery sponsor of this show for them to be equipped for their TV commercial to determine who will be the ambassador for PNJ. Once they wore it, high-fashion took them to a whole new level to boost up their glamour inside and out!

Fashion Designer Ly Qui Khanh divided the 12 remaining contestants into 2 teams, where each group consists of 6 people. Blue Team consists of Thanh, Châu, Tùng, Lan, Trâm & Phong, while Quang, Hường, Trang T., Dương, Phương & Nhã are belong to Red Team. This grouping applies to both segments of the said episode, in challenge & photo shoot. In the challenge, Blue Team won and got an afternoon at the movie theater, while Red Team won the commercial shoot and receiving an immunity reward from this episode's elimination. In the deliberation, aside from Red Team's immunity group photo, Thanh, Phong, Lan & Traâm followed. Châu & Tùng fell out in the bottom 2 to determine who will gain this week's best photo as Thanh Hằng's last call out for the top achiever, Châu earned her 1st best photo, while Tùng fell out & ended up in 12th place.

- Challenge winner: La Thanh Thanh, Nguyễn Thị Ngọc Châu, Hoàng Minh Tùng, Nguyễn Thiếu Lan, Trần Thị Thuỳ Trâm, Nguyễn Minh Phong
- Immune from elimination: Nguyễn Huy Quang, Trịnh Thu Hường, Trần Thị Thùy Trang, Bùi Huy Dương, Nguyễn Thị Phương & Vũ Trần Kim Nhã
- Best photo: Nguyễn Thị Ngọc Châu
- Bottom two: Hoàng Minh Tùng & Trần Thị Thùy Trâm
- Eliminated: Hoàng Minh Tùng
- Note: This is the last episode to feature judge Ly Qui Khanh as he later leave the position during filming.

=== Episode 8 ===
Original Airdate: September 4, 2016

Eleven remaining contestants went back to the model house to see Tùng's message, that may lead to Châu's emotional breakdown. That's why Châu felt so special to Tung, just like what happened to Lan on the 5th episode before she got fainted due to Minh's departure with Trang H. & Nam.

The next day, season 2 winner Hoàng Thùy arrived in the model house to talk about their improved catwalk practices for them to be equipped in the challenge before they went to Phan Thiet City sand dunes. When they practice their catwalking movement, Trang T. struggled, whereas Thanh & Trâm, Hường, Dương, Quang, Phong, Nhã, Phương, Châu & Lan were impressed by Thùy. Later on, Trang T. improved due to Quang & Hường's concerns.

As they arrived in Phan Thiet City sand dunes together with Samuel, Hang followed by taking an ATV ride. There can be not just one, but two challenges that they need to test themselves. First challenge would be walking on the sand dunes by carrying the libra scale balance without the support. The starting point would be the blue flag while the red flag would be its terminal point. Phong & Phuong got a just right comment, Quang, Dương & Lan got a minimal concern from Hang while Thanh, Châu, Trâm, Nhã & Hường stood positive and eager to face new challenges as Hằng is speechless for a great impression and Trang T. struggles the most because she didn't carry the libra scale correctly due to heavy weights and poor catwalks. As altogether went to red flag, they are surprised that there would be another challenge for them, is to pose at the back side of a driver when the ATV is kept on moving at the sand dunes as Samuel takes pictures to them.

Lan rides first to exhibit her variety of poses, followed by Châu, Phong, Hường, Trang T. (who raised her both arms to fly the sleeved tassels on it as she flies like an eagle), Trâm (who struggled first but later on, improved), Phương (who raised her scarf for her exceptional aura), Thanh (despite for her short height), Quang (who is ever since adventurous and has an exciting behavior), Dương & Nhã (who struggles the most). As Samuel expressed his thanks to the guest photographer for the benefit of the contestants, there can be no winners of the challenge announced since the second challenge is the combination/crossover between the second challenge and a pre-photo shoot as all of them made their way to the next photo shoot.

At the photo shoot, they were surprised that there would be a terrarium (with the hole at the bottom for them to insert his/her head as a sign of surprise) that is filled with sands, plants & some creepy animals like iguana, snake, baby crocodiles, frog and even large spiders that will be given to them. Nha was the first one to encounter with an iguana and a large spider for her beauty shots. Phong followed next with a baby crocodile, Trâm with a snake (but she was frightened at first) and a spider (for her courageous dare), Quang with a baby crocodile and a spider, Trang T. with a spider (but she was terrified and then, struggled), Lan with a toad & a fast-running spider (also frightened and struggled like Trang), Thanh with a snake (because she loves it) and an iguana (that made her way to success by being courageous), Dương with a baby crocodile and a spider, Châu with an iguana and a spider, Phương with an iguana & a snake (that made her shocked and struggled like Lan & Trang T.) & lastly, Hường with a crawling snake (that made her struggled at first, but later on, she ended up with a courage).

At the deliberation panel, Phong & Châu made a just right feedback, Nhã, Trâm, Phương, Dương, Lan & especially Trang struggled due to some uncertainties & Hường, Quang & Thanh were impressed by the judges for their excellence. For the call-out order announcement, Thanh gained her second victorious picture, made her mark as the second finalist to gain second best photo after Quang on episode 6. Followed by Hường, Quang, Phong, Châu, Trang T. & Lan in the safe position while Nhã, Dương, Phương & Trâm lead themselves into the danger zone. In the end, Nhã & Trâm got their tied-last-saved result whilst Dương & Phương are the next ones to be eliminated. As a result, Only half of the 18 finalists in the show are still in the running for the succeeding challenges & photo shoots.

- Best photo: La Thanh Thanh
- Bottom four: Bùi Huy Dương, Nguyễn Thị Phương, Trần Thị Thùy Trâm & Vũ Trần Kim Nhã
- Eliminated: Bùi Huy Dương & Nguyễn Thị Phương
- Featured photographer: Minduke
- Guest judge: Hoàng Thùy

=== Episode 9 ===
Original Airdate: September 11, 2016

After Dương & Phương departed, Nhã felt so bad about their elimination because she saw that both of them portray a good variety of poses in the photo shoot, most especially Phuong in speaking English fluently.

At the challenge, the 9 remaining finalist went to the runway hill platform first to climb up until they go down, the next would be the seesaw platform for them to reach the turntables to stay for one complete rotation and the icy carpet to brave the slippery floor for them to be better models. Nhã, Quang, Thanh, Trang T. & Hường struggled, Lan & Phong made a good performance, Châu frightened at first, but as she moves forward, she improved so well while Trâm made a solution to each obstacle that makes her victorious in the challenge.

In the photo shoot, they went to Nha Trang with two of the series' winners, Tạ Quang Hùng (from cycle 5) & Nguyễn Thị Hương Ly (from cycle 6) made their guest appearance for their commercial project from Hanvico furnishings. Hung partners with Hường, Nhã, Trâm, Lan, Châu & Thanh while Ly partners with Phong & Quang. Châu made a mark for the 2nd victory as judges impressed her the most. Followed by Hường, Thanh, Trâm, Lan & Phong for their good performance, while Quang, Trang T. & Nha fell down in the bottom 3. In a unanimous decision, Quang & Trang T. stayed in the running while Nhã is the 10th person to be eliminated, making everyone felt sad when she departed.

- Challenge winner: Trần Thị Thuỳ Trâm
- Best photo: Nguyễn Thị Ngọc Châu
- Bottom three: Nguyễn Huy Quang, Trần Thị Thùy Trang & Vũ Trần Kim Nhã
- Eliminated: Vũ Trần Kim Nhã
- Featured photographer: Mạnh Bi
- Guest judge: Nguyễn Thị Oanh, Tạ Quang Hùng, Nguyễn Thị Hương Ly

=== Episode 10 ===
Original Airdate: September 18, 2016

After Nhã's departure, Thanh will also leave before the challenge was started because she is in need for her spiritual support and went home to Binh Duong within 24 hours to reunite with her family. The next day, Actress Angela Phuong Trinh made an acting challenge together with the 8 remaining contestants. Châu, Hường & Quang made all of their acting efforts for them to excel this challenge. Trang T., Lan & Tram made a good movement and dialogue, whereas Phong struggled a lot due to his "very soft" voice that makes his acting a big need for his improvement. In the end, Châu won the challenge.

As they celebrate the Mooncake Festival, all 8 finalists went to Water Puppet Theatre to know the stories first that portrayed in a theatrical play before they used these props and effects for their poses in coincidence with the said festival. As a result, after landing in the bottom twice, Trang T. made a mark in this episode due to her large improvement in portraying a good variety of poses and won the best photo. Subsequently, Phong, Quang, Châu & Thanh delivered their good performance as well that brought Hường, Trâm & Lan in a bottom three for their oversimplified expression which don't gave life to their photos. Hường & Lan got a tied-last-saved result whilst Trâm lost in a unanimous decision. Thanh cried a lot as Trâm leaves because she feels that she is the strongest connector for Trâm's friendship. Châu as well, but later comforted Thanh from their grief.

- Challenge winner: Nguyễn Thị Ngọc Châu
- Best photo: Trần Thị Thùy Trang
- Bottom three: Trịnh Thu Hường, Nguyễn Thiếu Lan & Trần Thị Thuỳ Trâm
- Eliminated: Trần Thị Thuỳ Trâm
- Featured photographer: Trí Nghĩa
- Guest judge: Angela Phương Trinh

=== Episode 11 ===
Original Airdate: September 25, 2016

Prior to the challenge shoot, Phong confirms his leave of absence in order to reunite with his family in Tien Giang province. The next day, judge Hà Đỗ conducted a meeting with Hường, Châu, Trang T, Lan, Thanh & Quang about TRESemmé commercial challenge shoot where they can play their hair when the electric fan turned on at its highest speed for their hair to fly. Lan, Châu, Quang & Thanh impressed Hà Đỗ, especially when Thanh excels the most among all of them that may led her to challenge win whilst Trang T. & Hường struggled at first, but made it into a successful end of their challenge shoot.

Multimedia JSC President & Chief Executive Officer Lê Thị Quỳnh Trang went there to conduct a runway commercial shoot for Vietnam International Fashion Week 2016, as they have to say the lines and walk the runway backward while removing each layer of clothing. Quang & Châu impressed the judges yet garnered an okay comment, Trang T., Phong & Hường struggled and doesn't give life to their commercial shoots, Lan overpowered high fashion statement over her facial expression & Thanh sets herself into a higher notch of her performance that gave zest to her commercial that led to her 3rd best photo victory, making her mark to become the strongest contestant in this cycle. After Thanh, Quang & Chau followed leading Trang T., Hường, Lan & Phong to bottom 4 in order that only one of the contestants could complete the final 4 slots. Thanh Hằng saw in the tally of best photos that Trang T. recently earned her first and only best photo on Episode 10 that made her mark in this episode that she will complete the top 4 slot, leaving Phong, Hường & Lan eliminated as an achievement-based result.

After the elimination, the final 4 flown to Sydney for another project, Canifa 2016/2017 Fall/Winter series catalogue, where all 4 of them will become its brand ambassadors for this year in this upcoming campaign. They were later in for a surprise as their loved one arrive to meet them when they returned to Ho Chi Minh City.

- Challenge winner: La Thanh Thanh
- Best photo: La Thanh Thanh
- Bottom four: Trịnh Thu Hường, Nguyễn Thiếu Lan, Nguyễn Minh Phong & Trần Thị Thùy Trang
- Eliminated: Trịnh Thu Hường, Nguyễn Thiếu Lan & Nguyễn Minh Phong
- Guest judge: Lê Thị Quỳnh Trang

=== Episode 12 ===
Original Airdate: October 2, 2016

In the live finale, singer Hoàng Thùy Linh along with her back-up dancers made their impressive concert as a grand entrance to this live finale episode. Live finale host Tùng Leo reprised his role for the 3rd straight time by introducing himself first, then the judges (including Hằng, the Host).

Prior to the revelation of voting results, 14 eliminated finalists came to runway again for their fashion competition where only one of them will be returned as a 5th contestant to reach the final round with the final 4 contestants. A contestant who earns the highest votes will be returned while the rest of them will be re-eliminated again if they gained the lowest votes.

According to Kenh14 website, the final voting result is shown in percentages instead of quantified tally of votes.

- 1. Nguyễn Minh Phong - 17.58%
- 2. Vũ Trần Kim Nhã - 12.03%
- 3. Nguyễn Duy Minh - 8.38%
- 4. Hoàng Minh Tùng - 7.86%
- 5. Nguyễn Thiếu Lan - 7.33%
- 6. Trương Bùi Hoài Nam - 3.85%
- 7. Nguyễn Thị Phuong - 3.22%
- 8. Bùi Huy Dương - 2.89%
- 9. Trần Thị Thùy Trâm - 2.58%
- 10. Trịnh Thu Hường - 2.23%
- 11. Hà Thị Út Trang - 1.42%
- 12. Nguyễn Anh Thư - 1.23%
- 13. Phạm Gia Long - 0.76%
- 14. Nguyễn Thị Thùy Dung - 0.63%

In the end, this percent-vote result revealed that Phong will be returned as a 5th contestant to be completed in the final round. This final showdown will be consisted of 2 parts, the Black & Red shades of fashion runway (for Top 5) & the big-mirror photoshoot (for Top 3). After the first part of the finals was ended, Thanh, Quang & Châu will advance to the second part while Phong & Trang T. are eliminated. In the second part of this episode, all 3 remaining contestants impressed the judges well but they will determine who will be the winner of this cycle. The cover of Harper's Bazaar that was shown on the screen featuring the Top 5 contestants will reveal the winner, and that was Châu who came out to break the rules for her to win.

- Returned: Nguyễn Minh Phong
- Final five: La Thanh Thanh, Nguyễn Huy Quang, Nguyễn Minh Phong, Nguyễn Thị Ngọc Châu & Trần Thị Thuỳ Trang
- Eliminated: Nguyễn Minh Phong & Trần Thị Thuỳ Trang
- Final three: La Thanh Thanh, Nguyễn Huy Quang & Nguyễn Thị Ngọc Châu
- Vietnam's Next Top Model 2016: Nguyễn Thị Ngọc Châu
- Featured photographer: Minduke
- Guest judge: Hoàng Thùy Linh, Tùng Leo

== Summaries ==
=== Call-out order ===
Order	Episodes												
Order	1	2	3	4	5	6	7	8	9	10	11	12	
1	Dung	Trang T.	Phương	Quang	Nhã	Quang	Hường	Thanh	Châu	Trang T.	Thanh	Châu	Châu
2	Tùng	Quang	Nam	Trâm	Thanh	Trâm	Phương	Hường	Hường	Phong	Quang	Quang	Quang; Thanh
3	Dương	Phương	Dương	Tùng	Quang	Phương	Quang	Quang	Thanh	Châu	Châu	Thanh	Quang; Thanh
4	Trâm	Châu	Tùng	Lan	Dương	Phong	Nhã	Phong	Trâm	Quang	Trang T.	Trang T. Phong	
5	Lan	Trâm	Châu	Dương	Châu	Nhã	Dương	Châu	Lan	Thanh	Hường; Lan; Phong	Trang T. Phong	
6	Châu	Trang H.	Phong	Phương	Phương	Hường	Trang T.	Trang T.	Phong	Hường; Lan	Hường; Lan; Phong		
7	Phong	Thư	Quang	Trang T.	Tùng	Thanh	Thanh	Lan	Quang	Hường; Lan	Hường; Lan; Phong		
8	Thư	Minh	Thanh	Châu	Phong	Châu	Phong	Nhã	Trang T.	Trâm			
9	Thanh	Nhã	Hường	Phong	Trang T.	Dương	Lan	Trâm	Nhã				
10	Quang	Dương	Lan	Thanh	Thư	Tùng	Trâm	Dương; Phương					
11	Trang H.	Thanh	Trang T.	Hường	Trâm	Lan; Trang T.	Châu	Dương; Phương					
12	Hường	Tùng	Nhã	Nhã	Hường; Lan	Lan; Trang T.	Tùng						
13	Long	Phong	Trang H.	Thư	Hường; Lan	Thư							
14	Minh	Lan	Thư	Minh; Nam; Trang H.									
15	Nam	Nam	Minh	Minh; Nam; Trang H.									
16	Nhã	Hường	Trâm	Minh; Nam; Trang H.									
17	Phương	Dung; Long											
18	Trang T.	Dung; Long											

The contestant was immune from elimination
The contestant was eliminated
The contestant was originally eliminated from the competition but was saved
The contestant was eliminated outside of the judging panel room
The contestant won the competition

=== Average call-out order ===
Episode 1,2 are not included

Rank by average	Place	Model	Call-out total	Number of call-outs	Call-out average
1	2-3	Quang	35	10	3.50
2	1	Châu	40	10	4.00
3	2-3	Thanh	47	10	4.70
4	10-11	Phương	30	6	5.00
5	4-5	Phong	58	10	5.80
6	10-11	Dương	37	6	6.17
7	6-7	Hường	56	9	6.22
8	4-5	T.Trang	69	10	6.90
9	12	Tùng	36	5	7.20
10	9	Nhã	53	7	7.57
11	8	Trâm	62	8	7.75
12	14-16	Nam	16	2	8.00
13	6-7	Lan	74	9	8.22
14	13	Thư	50	4	12.50
15	14-16	U.Trang	29	2	14.50
16	14-16	Minh	30	2	15.00
17	17-18	Long	17	1	17.00
18	17-18	Dung	18	1	18.00

=== Photo shoot guide ===
- Episode 1 photo shoot: Break the rules (casting)
- Episode 2 photo shoot: Posing on suspended geometric shapes
- Episode 3 photo shoot: Couples in Vintage era
- Episode 4 photo shoot: Falling in air as explorers
- Episode 5 photo shoot: Underwater for Samsung Galaxy S7
- Episode 6 photo shoot: Posing with eagle and fire in circus
- Episode 7 commercial: Fashion film for PNJ Jewelry with one shot
- Episode 8 photo shoot: Bald Beauty shot with reptiles
- Episode 9 photo shoot: Couples on the beach for CANIFA and My Youth - HANVICO
- Episode 10 photo shoot: Mid-autumn festival couture
- Episode 11 video shoot: Vietnam International Fashion Week promotions
- Episode 12 photo shoot: Posing in Mirrors

== Judges ==
- Phạm Thị Thanh Hằng (host)
- Samuel Hoàng
- Lý Quí Khánh
- Hà Đỗ
