= Vietnam's Next Top Model season 5 =

Season of TV show

Vietnam's Next Top Model
- Season 5

Release
- Original network: Multimedia JSC (domestically); VTV (domestically); CBS Television Distribution (internationally)
- Original release: November 1, 2014 – January 17, 2015

Season chronology
- ← Previous; Cycle 4 Next → Cycle 6

Vietnam's Next Top Model, Cycle 5 is the fifth season of Vietnam's Next Top Model. It began on VTV on November 1, 2014. Males were still featured as part of the show.

The former host, Xuan Lan, who hosted cycles two and three, returned to fulfill her position as head judge of the panel. Samuel Hoang was also introduced, as a new judge. Adam Williams became a permanent judge.

There were two winners of this season were 18-year-old Nguyễn Thị Oanh from Quảng Ninh and 20-year-old Tạ Quang Hùng from Gia Lai.

12th place Lê Thị Kim Dung later claimed victory as the winner of the All-Stars cycle.

== Overview ==
=== Requirements ===
All applying contestants for the show had to meet the following requirements:

- Young men and women had to be Vietnamese citizens or foreigners of Vietnamese origin.
- Be between the ages of 18 and 25
- Meet a minimum height requirement of 170 cm (for women) and 175 cm (for men)
- Not be managed exclusively by companies, agencies, or products.
- Have no criminal record

=== Auditions ===
| Audition city | Date | Venue |
| Hanoi | August 20, 2014 | The Garden Shopping Center |
| Ho Chi Minh City | August 26, 2014 | Grand Palace |

=== Next top model Online ===
This year, the organizers of the show began a contest named Next Top Model Online on Facebook. After the contest, the ten aspiring contestants with the highest number of votes were allowed to advance to the bikini round during casting week.

=== Prizes ===
The winner received the following prizes:

- A 1 billion VND contract with BeU Models
- The opportunity to appear on the cover of F Fashion Magazine along with a cash prize of 200 million VND
- A one-year exclusive contract Lumia worth 300 million VND, along with the free use of their latest mobile phones from Microsoft Devices
- A one-year contract with Canifa worth 200 million VND
- A prize of 100 million VND from Bourjois Paris Cosmetics
- Centurion card membership from California Fitness & Yoga Center worth 450 million VND

== Contestants ==
| Contestant | Age | Height | Home town | Finish | Place |
|---|---|---|---|---|---|
| Hồ Văn Năm | 23 | 1.81 m (5 ft 11 1/2 in) | Nghệ An | Episode 2 | 16-15 |
| Nguyễn Văn Thắng | 23 | 1.79 m (5 ft 10 1/2 in) | Berlin, Germany | Episode 2 | 16-15 |
| Nguyễn Thị Thanh Tuyền | 19 | 1.81 m (5 ft 11 1/2 in) | Ho Chi Minh City | Episode 3 | 14 |
| Lê Đức Anh | 20 | 1.85 m (6 ft 1 in) | Hà Nội | Episode 4 | 13 |
| Lê Thị Kim Dung | 21 | 1.77 m (5 ft 9 1/2 in) | Nam Định | Episode 5 | 12 |
| Trần Yến Nhi | 23 | 1.76 m (5 ft 9 1/2 in) | Kiên Giang | Episode 6 | 11-10 |
| Phạm Công Toàn | 25 | 1.86 m (6 ft 1 in) | Đồng Nai | Episode 6 | 11-10 |
| Chế Nguyễn Quỳnh Châu | 20 | 1.74 m (5 ft 8 1/2 in) | Đà Lạt | Episode 7 | 9-8 |
| Lê Đăng Khánh | 19 | 1.86 m (6 ft 1 in) | Ho Chi Minh City | Episode 7 | 9-8 |
| Phạm Tấn Khang | 19 | 1.85 m (6 ft 1 in) | Los Angeles, USA | Episode 8 | 7 |
| Đặng Văn Hội | 21 | 1.93 m (6 ft 4 in) | Thái Bình | Episode 10 | 6 |
| Phạm Duy Anh | 19 | 1.89 m (6 ft 2 1/2 in) | Hà Nội | Episode 11 | 5-3 |
| Tiêu Ngọc Linh | 20 | 1.78 m (5 ft 10 in) | Hải Dương | Episode 11 | 5-3 |
| Cao Thị Ngân | 22 | 1.78 m (5 ft 10 in) | Kiên Giang | Episode 11 | 5-3 |
| Tạ Quang Hùng | 20 | 1.90 m (6 ft 3 in) | Gia Lai | Episode 11 | 1 |
| Nguyễn Thị Oanh | 18 | 1.83 m (6 ft 0 in) | Quảng Ninh | Episode 11 | 1 |

== Episode summaries ==
=== Episode 1 ===
First aired: November 1, 2014

- Top 16: Hồ Văn Nam, Nguyễn Văn Thắng, Cao Thị Ngân, Chế Nguyễn Quỳnh Châu, Đặng Văn Hội, Lê Thị Kim Dung, Lê Đăng Khánh, Lê Đức Anh, Nguyễn Thị Oanh, Nguyễn Thị Thanh Tuyền, Phạm Công Toàn, Phạm Duy Anh, Phạm Tấn Khang, Tiêu Ngọc Linh, Tiêu Ngọc Linh, Trần Yến Nhi, Tạ Quang Hùng

=== Episode 2 ===
First aired: November 8, 2014

- First call-out: Nguyễn Thị Oanh
- Bottom Four: Đặng Văn Hội, Hồ Văn Năm, Nguyễn Văn Thắng & Phạm Duy Anh
- Eliminated: Hồ Văn Năm & Nguyễn Văn Thắng

=== Episode 3 ===
First aired: November 15, 2014

- First call-out: Phạm Tấn Khang & Trần Yến Nhi
- Bottom Four: Cao Thị Ngân, Đặng Văn Hội, Tạ Quang Hùng & Nguyễn Thị Thanh Tuyền
- Eliminated: Nguyễn Thị Thanh Tuyền

=== Episode 4 ===
First aired: November 22, 2014

- First call-out: Phạm Công Toàn
- Bottom Three: Phạm Tấn Khang, Lê Thị Kim Dung & Lê Đức Anh
- Eliminated: Lê Đức Anh

=== Episode 5 ===
First aired: November 29, 2014

- First call-out: Phạm Tấn Khang
- Bottom Two: Trần Yến Nhi & Lê Thị Kim Dung
- Eliminated: Lê Thị Kim Dung

=== Episode 6 ===
First aired: December 13, 2014

- First call-out: Tạ Quang Hùng
- Bottom Three: Phạm Công Toàn, Trần Yến Nhi & Chế Nguyễn Quỳnh Châu
- Eliminated: Phạm Công Toàn & Trần Yến Nhi

=== Episode 7 ===
First aired: December 20, 2014

- First call-out: Tiêu Ngọc Linh
- Bottom Four: Chế Nguyễn Quỳnh Châu, Lê Đăng Khánh, Phạm Tấn Khang & Tạ Quang Hùng
- Eliminated: Chế Nguyễn Quỳnh Châu & Lê Đăng Khánh

=== Episode 8 ===
First aired: December 27, 2014

- First call-out: Tiêu Ngọc Linh
- Bottom Two: Cao Thị Ngân & Phạm Tấn Khang
- Eliminated: Phạm Tấn Khang

=== Episode 9 ===
First aired: January 3, 2015

- First call-out: Tiêu Ngọc Linh & Phạm Duy Anh
- Bottom Two: Nguyễn Thị Oanh & Đặng Văn Hội
- Originally eliminated: Nguyễn Thị Oanh

=== Episode 10 ===
First aired: January 10, 2015

- First call-out: Phạm Duy Anh
- Bottom Three: Tiêu Ngọc Linh, Nguyễn Thị Oanh & Đặng Văn Hội
- Eliminated: Nguyễn Thị Oanh & Đặng Văn Hội
- Saved: Nguyễn Thị Oanh

=== Episode 11 ===
First aired: January 17, 2015

- Final Five: Cao Thị Ngân, Nguyễn Thị Oanh, Phạm Duy Anh, Tạ Quang Hùng & Tiêu Ngọc Linh
- Eliminated: Cao Thị Ngân, Phạm Duy Anh & Tiêu Ngọc Linh
- Final Two: Nguyễn Thị Oanh & Tạ Quang Hùng
- Vietnam's Next Top Model 2014: Tạ Quang Hùng & Nguyễn Thị Oanh

== Summaries ==
=== Call-out order ===
| Order | Episodes | | | | | | | | | | |
| Order | 2 | 3 | 4 | 5 | 6 | 7 | 8 | 9 (Note: In episode 9, Nguyen Oanh and Van Hoi were initially eliminated, but were saved.) | 10 (Note: In episode 10, Nguyen Oanh was initially eliminated, but was saved. For the first time in the history of Next Top Model worldwide, there were 5 contestants competing in the Final night.) | 11 (Note: In episode 11, for the first time in the history of Next Top Model worldwide, there were two Champions. Cao Ngan, Ngoc Linh, Duy Anh won the title of Runner-up.) | |
|---|---|---|---|---|---|---|---|---|---|---|---|
| 1 | Oanh | Khang | Toàn | Khang | Hùng | Linh | Linh | Anh P. Linh | Anh P. | Hùng | Oanh; Hùng |
| 2 | Khang | Nhi | Hội | Toàn | Linh | Anh P. | Anh P. | Anh P. Linh | Ngân | Oanh | Oanh; Hùng |
| 3 | Nhi | Anh L. Linh | Nhi | Hùng | Hội | Hội | Oanh | Hùng; Ngân | Hùng | Anh P. Ngân; Linh | |
| 4 | Linh | Anh L. Linh | Khánh | Châu | Khang | Ngân | Hội | Hùng; Ngân | Linh | Anh P. Ngân; Linh | |
| 5 | Toàn | Châu; Khánh | Linh | Oanh | Ngân | Oanh | Hùng | Hội | Oanh | Anh P. Ngân; Linh | |
| 6 | Hùng | Châu; Khánh | Châu | Hội | Khánh | Hùng | Ngân | Oanh | Hội | | |
| 7 | Châu | Anh P. Dung | Ngân | Linh | Anh P. | Khang | Khang | | | | |
| 8 | Anh L. | Anh P. Dung | Anh P. | Anh P. | Oanh | Châu; Khánh | | | | | |
| 9 | Tuyền | Oanh; Toàn | Hùng | Khánh | Châu | Châu; Khánh | | | | | |
| 10 | Dung | Oanh; Toàn | Oanh | Ngân | Nhi; Toàn | | | | | | |
| 11 | Khánh | Ngân; Hội | Khang | Nhi | Nhi; Toàn | | | | | | |
| 12 | Ngân | Ngân; Hội | Dung | Dung | | | | | | | |
| 13 | Hội | Hùng | Anh L. | | | | | | | | |
| 14 | Anh P. | Tuyền | | | | | | | | | |
| 15 | Năm; Thắng | | | | | | | | | | |
| 16 | Năm; Thắng | | | | | | | | | | |

The contestant was eliminated
The contestant was originally eliminated from the competition but was saved
The contestants won the competition

- In episode 1, there is no call-out order and the 16 models were told separately whether they make it to the competition.
- In episode 3, the models were called in pairs, with the exception of the bottom two.
- In episode 9, Anh P. and Linh received first call-out as a pair. Oanh was originally eliminated when she landed in the bottom two with Hội. The judges decided to keep her in the competition
- In episode 10, both Oanh and Hội were eliminated when they landed in the bottom three with Linh. Once again, Oanh was spared from being eliminated.
- In episode 11, both Hùng and Oanh declared as the winners.

=== Average call-out order ===
Episode 1 is not included

| Rank by average | Place | Model | Call-out total | Number of call-outs | Call-out average |
|---|---|---|---|---|---|
| 1 | 3-5 | Linh | 32 | 10 | 3.20 |
| 2 | 7 | Khang | 33 | 7 | 4.71 |
| 3 | 1-2 | Hùng | 53 | 11 | 4.81 |
| 4 | 1-2 | Oanh | 56 | 11 | 5.09 |
| 5 | 3-5 | Anh P. | 53 | 10 | 5.30 |
| 6 | 10-11 | Toàn | 28 | 5 | 5.60 |
| 7 | 10-11 | Nhi | 29 | 5 | 5.80 |
| 8 | 6 | Hội | 54 | 9 | 6.00 |
| 9-10 | 3-5 | Ngân | 65 | 10 | 6.50 |
| 9-10 | 8-9 | Châu | 39 | 6 | 6.50 |
| 11 | 8-9 | Khánh | 45 | 6 | 7.50 |
| 12 | 13 | Anh L. | 25 | 3 | 8.33 |
| 13 | 12 | Dung | 42 | 4 | 10.50 |
| 14 | 14 | Tuyền | 23 | 2 | 11.50 |
| 15 | 15-16 | Năm | 15 | 1 | 15.00 |
| 16 | 15-16 | Thắng | 16 | 1 | 16.00 |

=== Photo Shoot Guide ===
- Episode 1 Photo Shoot: Promotional Photos
- Episode 2 Photo Shoot: Futuristic Fashion
- Episode 3 Photo Shoot: Ballet Couples with Colored Powder
- Episode 4 Photo Shoot: Urban Skating
- Episode 5 Photo Shoot: Editorial with Sheep
- Episode 6 Photo Shoot: Tribal Beauty
- Episode 7 Photo Shoots: Denim in a Jean Factory; Luxury Editorial
- Episode 8 Photo Shoot: Air Asia print ads
- Episode 9 Commercials: TVC for CANIFA
- Episode 10 Photo Shoots: Hanging from a Skyscraper; F Magazine Covers in Milan
- Episode 11 Photo Shoot: Futuristic Angel on air

== Judges ==
- Nguyễn Xuân Lan (host)
- Đinh Nam Trung
- Adam Williams
- Hương Color
