= Vietnam's Next Top Model season 4 =

Vietnam's Next Top Model
- Season 4

Release
- Original network: Multimedia JSC (domestically); VTV (domestically); CBS Television Distribution (internationally)
- Original release: October 6 – December 22, 2013

Season chronology
- ← Previous; Cycle 3 Next → Cycle 5

Vietnam's Next Top Model, Cycle 4 is the fourth season of Vietnam's Next Top Model. It was broadcast on VTV in 2013, featuring 18 finalists including 8 male and 10 female contestants.

This is the first year the show includes male contestants in addition to female contestants in previous years. The change was made after the 20th season of America's Next Top Model, which opened to male models.

When its audition round kicked off in August, the show attracted 1,200 participants, the highest number of applicants so far. Fashion designer Do Manh Cuong and makeup specialist Nam Trung, previous season's judges, stayed on the jury this year. The board welcomed two new judges, supermodel Thanh Hang, and famed Australian catwalk coach Adam Williams (briefly appearance due to become a judge on Asia's Next Top Model (cycle 2)). J. Alexander appeared as a special guest judge in the final show.

The winner received a prize of up to VND2 billion (US$95,080). The top candidates had chances to get trained in Paris. The season premiered on October 6, 2013 at 8pm every Sunday on VTV3.

The winner was 21-year-old Mâu Thị Thanh Thủy from Hồ Chí Minh City.

== Contestants ==
Contestant	Age	Height	Hometown	Finish	Place
Ngô Thị Quỳnh Mai	18	1.72 m (5 ft 7 1/2 in)	Hồ Chí Minh City	Episode 3	18-15
Đỗ Thị Kim Ngân	20	1.74 m (5 ft 8 1/2 in)	Lạng Sơn	Episode 3	18-15
Lê Uyên Phương Thảo	23	1.71 m (5 ft 7 1/2 in)	Đồng Nai	Episode 3	18-15
Nguyễn Quốc Minh Tòng	21	1.85 m (6 ft 1 in)	Đắk Lắk	Episode 3	18-15
Tạ Thúc Bình	21	1.80 m (5 ft 11 in)	Hà Nội	Episode 4	14-13
Phan Thị Thùy Linh	20	1.73 m (5 ft 8 in)	Lâm Đồng	Episode 4	14-13
Phạm Thị Kim Thoa	24	1.74 m (5 ft 8 1/2 in)	Lào Cai	Episode 5	12
Trần Mạnh Kiên	20	1.83 m (6 ft 0 in)	Vĩnh Phúc	Episode 6	11
Đinh Hà Thu	23	1.72 m (5 ft 7 1/2 in)	Hải Phòng	Episode 7	10-9
Nguyễn Trần Trung	20	1.84 m (6 ft 1/2 in)	Hanoi	Episode 7	10-9
Nguyễn Thị Thanh	20	1.75 m (5 ft 9 in)	Thái Bình	Episode 8	8
Trần Quang Đại	20	1.84 m (6 ft 1/2 in)	Vũng Tàu	Episode 9	7
Nguyễn Thị Hằng	20	1.75 m (5 ft 9 in)	Đồng Nai	Episode 10	6-5
Dương Mạc Anh Quân	24	1.86 m (6 ft 1 in)	Hanoi	Episode 10	6-5
Nguyễn Thị Chà Mi	21	1.74 m (5 ft 8 1/2 in)	Phú Thọ	Episode 11	4-3
Lê Văn Kiên	20	1.89 m (6 ft 2 1/2 in)	Thanh Hóa	Episode 11	4-3
Vũ Tuấn Việt	21	1.82 m (5 ft 11 1/2 in)	Hải Dương	Episode 11	2
Mâu Thị Thanh Thủy	21	1.78 m (5 ft 10 in)	Hồ Chí Minh City	Episode 11	1

- Ngô Thị Quỳnh Mai became one of the 14 finalists in the fourth cycle of Asia's Next Top Model

== Episodes ==
=== Episode 1 ===
Original Airdate: October 6, 2013

This was the casting episode. The eighteen finalists were chosen.

=== Episode 2 ===
Original Airdate: October 13, 2013

- First call-out: Trần Quang Đại
- Bottom two: Mâu Thị Thanh Thủy & Nguyễn Thị Thanh
- Eliminated: None

=== Episode 3 ===
Original Airdate: October 20, 2013

- Challenge winner: Nguyễn Thị Chà Mi
- First call-out: Nguyễn Thị Chà Mi
- Bottom five: Đỗ Thị Kim Ngân, Lê Uyên Phương Thảo, Lê Văn Kiên, Ngô Thị Quỳnh Mai & Nguyễn Quốc Minh Tòng
- Eliminated: Đỗ Thị Kim Ngân, Lê Uyên Phương Thảo, Ngô Thị Quỳnh Mai & Nguyễn Quốc Minh Tòng

=== Episode 4 ===
Original Airdate: October 27, 2013

- Challenge winner: Mâu Thị Thanh Thủy
- First call-out: Lê Văn Kiên
- Bottom three: Đinh Hà Thu, Phan Thị Thùy Linh & Tạ Thúc Bình
- Eliminated: Phan Thị Thùy Linh & Tạ Thúc Bình

=== Episode 5 ===
Original Airdate: November 3, 2013

- Challenge winner: Vũ Tuấn Việt
- First call-out: Dương Mạc Anh Quân
- Bottom two: Phạm Thị Kim Thoa & Trần Mạnh Kiên
- Eliminated: Phạm Thị Kim Thoa
- Note: This is the last episode to feature judge Adam Williams as he later leave the position during filming.

=== Episode 6 ===
Original Airdate: November 10, 2013

- Challenge winner: Trần Mạnh Kiên
- First call-out: Vũ Tuấn Việt
- Bottom two: Lê Văn Kiên & Trần Mạnh Kiên
- Eliminated: Trần Mạnh Kiên

=== Episode 7 ===
Original Airdate: November 17, 2013

- Challenge winner: Đinh Hà Thu
- First call-out: Mâu Thị Thanh Thủy
- Bottom three: Đinh Hà Thu, Nguyễn Trần Trung & Trần Quang Đại
- Eliminated: Đinh Hà Thu & Nguyễn Trần Trung

=== Episode 8 ===
Original Airdate: November 24, 2013

- Challenge winner: Dương Mạc Anh Quân
- First call-out: Nguyễn Thị Hằng
- Bottom two: Lê Văn Kiên & Nguyễn Thị Thanh
- Eliminated: Nguyễn Thị Thanh

=== Episode 9 ===
Original Airdate: December 1, 2013

- Challenge winners: Mâu Thị Thanh Thủy & Vũ Tuấn Việt
- First call-out: Nguyễn Thị Chà Mi
- Bottom two: Dương Mạc Anh Quân & Trần Quang Đại
- Eliminated: Trần Quang Đại

=== Episode 10 ===
Original Airdate: December 8, 2013

- Challenge winner: Lê Văn Kiên
- First call-out: Mâu Thị Thanh Thủy
- Bottom three: Dương Mạc Anh Quân, Nguyễn Thị Hằng & Vũ Tuấn Việt
- Eliminated: Dương Mạc Anh Quân & Nguyễn Thị Hằng

=== Episode 11 ===
Original Airdate: December 15, 2013

- Final four: Lê Văn Kiên, Mâu Thị Thanh Thủy, Nguyễn Thị Chà Mi & Vũ Tuấn Việt
- Eliminated: Lê Văn Kiên & Nguyễn Thị Chà Mi
- Final two: Mâu Thị Thanh Thủy & Vũ Tuấn Việt
- Vietnam's Next Top Model 2013: Mâu Thị Thanh Thủy

== Summaries ==
=== Call-out order ===
Order	Episodes											
Order	1	2 (Note: In episode 2, Mau Thuy and Nguyen Thanh were at the bottom of the table but were not eliminated.)	3	4	5	6	7	8	9	10	11	
1	Trung	Đại	Mi	Kiên L.	Quân	Việt	Thủy	Hằng	Mi	Thủy	Thủy	Thủy
2	Thảo	Mai	Việt	Mi	Thu	Thu	Hằng	Việt	Thủy	Mi	Việt	Việt
3	Tòng	Thoa	Bình	Thoa	Trung	Trung	Việt	Đại	Kiên L.	Kiên L.	Mi; Kiên L.	
4	Hằng	Mi	Thu	Việt	Đại	Thủy	Quân	Mi	Việt	Việt	Mi; Kiên L.	
5	Quân	Hằng	Hằng	Thanh	Thủy	Hằng	Mi	Thủy	Hằng	Hằng; Quân		
6	Mai	Linh	Trung	Đại	Việt	Quân	Kiên L.	Quân	Quân	Hằng; Quân		
7	Thủy	Việt	Linh	Trung	Thanh	Thanh	Thanh	Kiên L.	Đại			
8	Thanh	Thu	Thoa	Kiên T.	Hằng	Mi	Đại	Thanh				
9	Linh	Kiên T.	Thủy	Hằng	Kiên L.	Đại	Thu; Trung					
10	Đại	Ngân	Kiên T.	Thủy	Mi	Kiên L.	Thu; Trung					
11	Bình	Trung	Quân	Quân	Kiên T.	Kiên T.						
12	Mi	Bình	Đại	Thu	Thoa							
13	Kiên T.	Kiên L.	Thanh	Bình; Linh								
14	Ngân	Tòng	Kiên L.	Bình; Linh								
15	Kiên L.	Quân	Mai; Ngân; Thảo; Tòng									
16	Thu	Thảo	Mai; Ngân; Thảo; Tòng									
17	Thoa	Thanh; Thủy	Mai; Ngân; Thảo; Tòng									
18	Việt	Thanh; Thủy	Mai; Ngân; Thảo; Tòng									

The contestant was in a non-elimination bottom two.
The contestant was eliminated
The contestant won the competition

- Episode 2 featured non-eliminations.
- Episode 3 featured multiple eliminations.
- Episodes 4, 7, 10, and the first part of 11 featured double eliminations.

=== Average call-out order ===
Episode 1 is not included

Rank by average	Place	Model	Call-out total	Number of call-outs	Call-out average
1	2	Việt	37	11	3.36
2	3-4	Mi	41	10	4.10
3	5-6	Hằng	45	9	5.00
4	1	Thủy	57	11	5.18
5	9-10	Thu	37	6	6.17
6	7	Đại	50	8	6.25
7	12	Thoa	26	4	6.50
8	9-10	Trung	40	6	6.67
9	3-4	Kiên L.	69	10	6.90
10	5-6	Quân	66	9	7.33
11	15-18	Mai	17	2	8.50
12	13-14	Linh	27	3	9.00
13	8	Thanh	64	7	9.14
14	13-14	Bình	28	3	9.33
15	11	Kiên T.	49	5	9.80
16	15-18	Ngân	26	2	13.00
17	15-18	Tòng	32	2	16.00
18	15-18	Thảo	33	2	16.50

=== Photo Shoot Guide ===
- Episode 1 Photo Shoot: Full Body Shots (Casting)
- Episode 2 Photo Shoots: Beauty from smile
- Episode 3 Photo Shoot: Energy
- Episode 4 Photo Shoot: Beauty Shots with Zalora's
- Episode 5 Photo Shoot: Posing with an Ostrich
- Episode 6 Photo Shoot: Lighting Oneself
- Episode 7 Photo Shoot: Traditional Clothing at Cham Temple
- Episode 8 Photo Shoot: Led Lights Circus Shoot
- Episode 9 Photo Shoot: Gods and Goddesses in Singapore
- Episode 10 Commercial and Photo Shoot: Bourjois Lipstick Adverts; F Magazine Covers in Paris
- Episode 11 Photo Shoot: Love my Heart

== Judges ==
- Thanh Hằng (Host)
- Đinh Nam Trung
- Đỗ Mạnh Cường
- Adam Williams
