= Phú Thọ (town) =

- District-level town (Class-3)
- Phú Thọ Town; Thị xã Phú Thọ
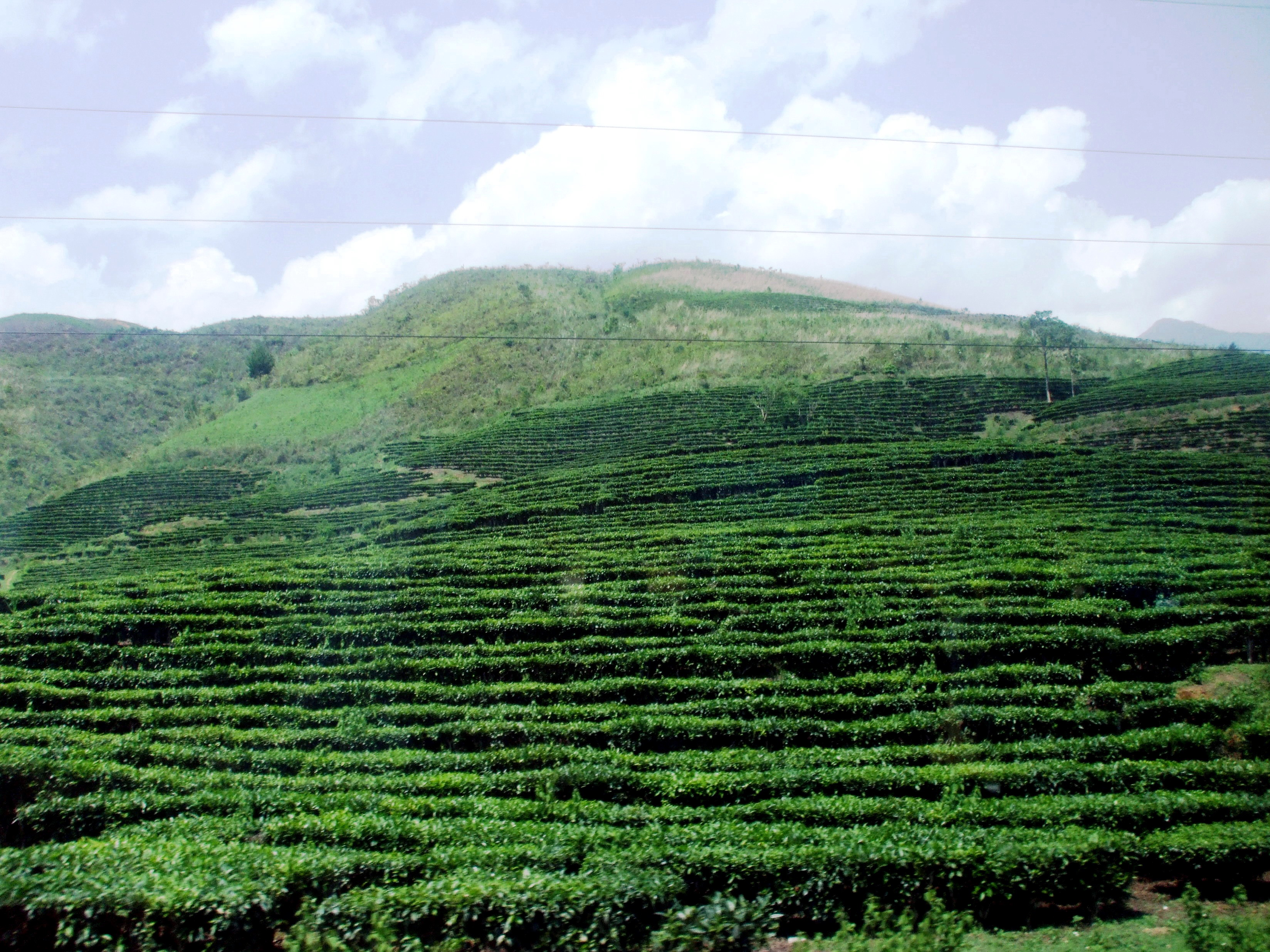
- Location of Phú Thọ within Vietnam
- Location within Vietnam
- Coordinates: 21°24′1″N 105°13′21″E
- Country: Vietnam
- Province: Phú Thọ

Area
  - Total: 24.9 sq mi (64.6 km^{2})

Population (2013)
  - Total: 91,650
- Time zone: UTC+7 (Indochina Time)

Phú Thọ is a former district-level town in Phú Thọ Province, Vietnam. As of 2003, the town had a population of 63,333. The town covers an area of 64 km^{2}.

== Geography ==
Phú Thọ is bordered by Phù Ninh to the north, Thanh Ba to the southwest, Tam Nông to the south and Lâm Thao to the southeast.

== Transport ==
Phu Tho is well-connected with Hanoi by public transport.
