= Vietnam's Next Top Model season 6 =

Vietnam's Next Top Model
- Season 6
- No. of episodes: 11

Release
- Original network: Multimedia JSC (domestically); VTV (domestically); CBS Television Distribution (internationally)
- Original release: August 2 – October 11, 2015

Season chronology
- ← Previous; Cycle 5 Next → Cycle 7

Vietnam's Next Top Model, Cycle 6 is the sixth season of Vietnam's Next Top Model. It premiered on August 2, 2015 on VTV. For the third time, males were still featured as part of the show. This year, former host Phạm Thị Thanh Hằng, who hosted Cycle 4 (the first guys-and-girls season of the show), returned to fulfill her position as head judge of the panel. Samuel Hoàng reprised his role as a judge after Cycle 5 concluded. Designer Adrian Anh Tuấn was also introduced as a new judge. This season's theme is: Keep Moving - Không Ngừng Chuyển Động.

The winner was 19-year-old Nguyễn Thị Hương Ly from Gia Lai.

== Overview ==
=== Requirements ===
All applying contestants for the show had to meet the following requirements:

- Young men and women had to be Vietnamese citizens or foreigners of Vietnamese origin.
- Be between the ages of 18 and 25.
- Meet a minimum height requirement of 170 cm (for women) and 175 cm (for men)
- Not be managed exclusively by companies, agencies, or products.
- Have no criminal record

=== Auditions ===
Audition City	Date	Venue
Hanoi	May 21, 2015	The Garden Shopping Center
Đà Nẵng	May 24, 2015	Eden Plaza 5
Cần Thơ	May 30, 2015	Van Phat Hotel
Ho Chi Minh City	June 3, 2015	Grand Palace

=== Next Top Model Online ===
Similar the last cycle, the organizers of the show began a contest named Next Top Model Online on Facebook and the official website of the competition. After the contest, the ten aspiring contestants with the highest number of votes will be allowed to advance to the bikini round during casting week.

=== Prizes ===
The winner received the following prizes:

- A 1 billion VND contract with BeU Models
- The opportunity to appear on the cover of Harper's Bazaar magazine along with a cash prize of 200 million VND
- A one-year exclusive contract with Canifa worth 200 million VND
- A one-year contract with Canifa worth 200 million VND
- Will be opening at Vietnam International Fashion Week 2015
- 100 million VND worth of vouchers by Eva de Eva
- 100 million VND worth of package by Pho Xinh furniture
- A one-year residential stay at Dragon Hill Residence and Suites from Phu Long Real Estate Joint Stock Company

== Contestants ==
Contestant	Age	Height	Hometown	Finish	Place
Nguyễn Thành Quốc	21	1.85 m (6 ft 1 in)	Vĩnh Long	Episode 2	14
Trần Hải Đăng	21	1.93 m (6 ft 4 in)	Nam Định	Episode 4	13-12
Nguyễn Thị Kim Phương	18	1.77 m (5 ft 9 1/2 in)	Cần Thơ	Episode 4	13-12
Hoàng Gia Anh Vũ	19	1.80 m (5 ft 11 in)	Hà Nội	Episode 5	11
Hoàng Anh Tú	21	1.84 m (6 ft 1/2 in)	Hải Phòng	Episode 7	10
H'Hen Niê	23	1.75 m (5 ft 9 in)	Đắk Lắk	Episode 8	9-8
Đào Thị Thu	21	1.74 m (5 ft 8 1/2 in)	Hà Tĩnh	Episode 8	9-8
Nguyễn Thị Hồng Vân	19	1.81 m (5 ft 11 1/2 in)	Hà Nội	Episode 9	7
K' Brơi	23	1.80 m (5 ft 11 in)	Lâm Đồng	Episode 10	6-5
Đinh Đức Thành	19	1.85 m (6 ft 1 in)	Hà Tĩnh	Episode 10	6-5
Võ Thành An	20	1.84 m (6 ft 1/2 in)	Đà Lạt	Episode 11	4-2
Nguyễn Thị Hợp	22	1.73 m (5 ft 8 in)	Quảng Ninh	Episode 11	4-2
Lương Thị Hồng Xuân	19	1.90 m (6 ft 3 in)	Vũng Tàu	Episode 11	4-2
Nguyễn Thị Hương Ly	19	1.76 m (5 ft 9 1/2 in)	Gia Lai	Episode 11	1

== Episodes ==
=== Episode 1 ===
Original Airdate: August 2, 2015

This was the casting episode. The fourteen finalists were chosen.

=== Episode 2 ===
Original Airdate: August 9, 2015

The top fourteen get their makeovers.

- Challenge winner: Nguyễn Thị Hợp
- First call-out: Đinh Đức Thành
- Bottom five: Nguyễn Thị Hương Ly, Nguyễn Thành Quốc, Hoàng Anh Tú, Nguyễn Thị Hồng Vân & Lương Thị Hồng Xuân
- Eliminated: Nguyễn Thành Quốc

=== Episode 3 ===
Original Airdate: August 16, 2015

- Challenge winner: K' Brơi & H' Hen Niê
- First call-out: Đinh Đức Thành
- Bottom three: Nguyễn Thị Hợp, Đào Thị Thu & Hoàng Gia Anh Vũ
- Originally eliminated but saved: Nguyễn Thị Hợp

=== Episode 4 ===
Original Airdate: August 23, 2015

- Challenge winner: Võ Thành An & H' Hen Niê
- First call-out: Hoàng Anh Tú
- Bottom five: Trần Hải Đăng, Nguyễn Thị Hợp, Nguyễn Thị Hương Ly, Nguyễn Thị Kim Phương & Đào Thị Thu
- Eliminated: Trần Hải Đăng & Nguyễn Thị Kim Phương

=== Episode 5 ===
Original Airdate: August 31, 2015

- Challenge winner: Nguyễn Thị Hương Ly
- First call-out: H' Hen Niê
- Bottom three: Nguyễn Thị Hợp, Đinh Đức Thành & Hoàng Gia Anh Vũ
- Eliminated: Hoàng Gia Anh Vũ

=== Episode 6 ===
Original Airdate: September 6, 2015

- Challenge winner: Võ Thành An
- First call-out: Đào Thị Thu
- Bottom three: Nguyễn Thị Hương Ly, Lương Thị Hồng Xuân & Nguyễn Thị Hồng Vân
- Originally eliminated but saved: Lương Thị Hồng Xuân

=== Episode 7 ===
Original Airdate: September 13, 2015

- Challenge winner: Võ Thành An & H' Hen Niê
- First call-out: Nguyễn Thị Hương Ly
- Bottom two: Hoàng Anh Tú, Nguyễn Thị Hợp & Lương Thị Hồng Xuân
- Eliminated: Hoàng Anh Tú

=== Episode 8 ===
Original Airdate: September 20, 2015

- Challenge winner: Lương Thị Hồng Xuân
- First call-out: Lương Thị Hồng Xuân
- Bottom three: Đào Thị Thu, Đinh Đức Thành & H' Hen Niê
- Eliminated: Đào Thị Thu & H'Hen Niê

=== Episode 9 ===
Original Airdate: September 27, 2015

- First call-out: Võ Thành An
- Bottom three: K' Brơi, Nguyễn Thị Hồng Vân & Nguyễn Thị Hương Ly
- Eliminated: Nguyễn Thị Hồng Vân

=== Episode 10 ===
Original Airdate: October 4, 2015

- Challenge winner: Nguyễn Thị Hương Ly
- First call-out: Lương Thị Hồng Xuân
- Bottom three: Đinh Đức Thành, K' Brơi & Nguyễn Thị Hương Ly
- Eliminated: Đinh Đức Thành & K' Brơi

=== Episode 11 ===
Original Airdate: October 11, 2015

- Final four: Lương Thị Hồng Xuân, Nguyễn Thị Hợp, Nguyễn Thị Hương Ly & Võ Thành An
- Vietnam's Next Top Model 2015: Nguyễn Thị Hương Ly

== Summaries ==
=== Call-out order ===
Order	Episodes										
Order	1	2	3	4	5	6	7	8	9	10	11
1	Thu	Thành	Thành	Tú	H'Hen	Thu	Ly	Xuân	An	Xuân	Ly
2	Hợp	Hợp	Xuân	Vân	Xuân	H'Hen	Vân	Ly	Hợp	Hợp	An; Hợp; Xuân
3	Phương	Brơi	Tú	Thành	Brơi	Tú	An	An	Thành	An	An; Hợp; Xuân
4	Vũ	Đăng	H'Hen	An	Thu	Brơi	H'Hen	Brơi	Xuân	Ly	An; Hợp; Xuân
5	H'Hen	Thu	Ly	Brơi	Tú	An	Thu	Hợp	Brơi	Brơi; Thành	
6	Thành	H'Hen	An	H'Hen	Ly	Thành	Thành	Vân	Ly	Brơi; Thành	
7	Tú	An	Vân	Vũ	An	Hợp	Brơi	Thành	Vân		
8	Ly	Phương	Đăng	Xuân	Vân	Ly	Xuân	H'Hen; Thu			
9	Đăng	Vũ	Phương	Ly	Thành	Vân	Hợp	H'Hen; Thu			
10	An	Xuân	Brơi	Hợp	Hợp	Xuân	Tú				
11	Xuân	Vân	Thu	Thu	Vũ						
12	Vân	Tú	Vũ	Đăng; Phương							
13	Quốc	Ly	Hợp	Đăng; Phương							
14	Brơi	Quốc									

The contestant was eliminated
The contestant was originally eliminated from the competition but was saved
The contestant won the competition

- In episode 1, the call-out order did not reflect each model's performance.

=== Average call-out order ===
Episode 1 is not included

Rank by average	Place	Model	Call-out total	Number of call-outs	Call-out average
1	2-4	An	42	10	4.20
2	8-9	Hen	31	7	4.43
3	5-6	Thành	41	9	4.56
4	2-4	Xuân	50	10	5.00
5	5-6	Brơi	47	9	5.22
6	1	Ly	55	10	5.50
7	10	Tú	34	6	5.67
8	2-4	Hợp	62	10	6.20
9	7	Vân	52	8	6.50
10	8-9	Thu	46	7	6.58
11	12-13	Đăng	25	3	8.33
12	12-13	Phương	29	3	9.67
13	11	Vũ	39	4	9.75
14	14	Quốc	14	1	14.00

=== Photo shoot guide ===
- Episode 1 photo shoot: Promotional photos
- Episode 2 photo shoot: Posing with logo "keep moving"
- Episode 3 photo shoot: Rock climbing
- Episode 4 photo shoot: Popular fashion trends in groups
- Episode 5 photo shoot: Colorful leotards in the jungle with monkeys & fruit headdresses
- Episode 6 photo shoot: Breakfast at Tiffany's inspired in pairs
- Episode 7 photo shoot: CANIFA lookbook in pairs
- Episode 8 photo shoot: Underwater jumpsuits
- Episode 9 photo shoots: Indoor skydiving; Editorial lookbook
- Episode 10 commercial & photo shoot: Samsung Galaxy S6 Edge Plus Advertisement
- Episode 11 photo shoots: Posing on Suspended Hoops

== Judges ==
- Phạm Thị Thanh Hằng (Host)
- Samuel Hoàng
- Adrian Anh Tuấn
