= Miss Cosmo Vietnam =

National beauty pageant competition in Vietnam

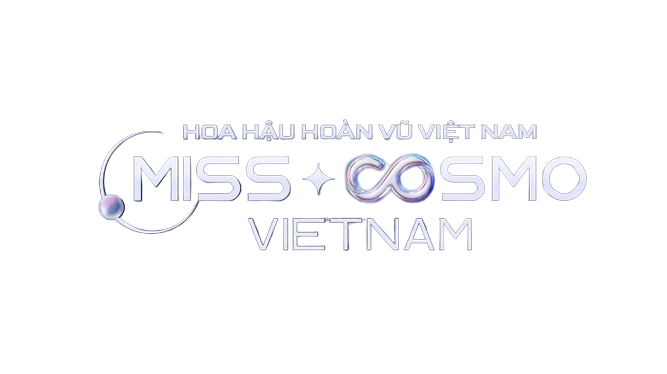
- Logo of Miss Cosmo Vietnam
- Formation: 2008; 18 years ago
- Type: Beauty pageant
- Headquarters: Ho Chi Minh City
- Location: Vietnam
- Members: Miss Universe (2008 – 2022); Miss Cosmo (2023 –present)
- Official language: Vietnamese
- CEO: Trần Việt Bảo Hoàng
- Website: hoahauhoanvuvietnam.com

Miss Cosmo Vietnam (Vietnamese: Hoa hậu Hoàn vũ Việt Nam) is a national beauty pageant in Vietnam. Until 2022, the pageant used to select the country's representative to the Miss Universe, one of the Big Four major international beauty pageants under the name Miss Universe Vietnam but ultimately changed to the current English name after losing the license in 2023. Along with Miss Vietnam and Miss World Vietnam, Miss Cosmo Vietnam is one of the Big Three national beauty pageants in Vietnam.

The current Miss Cosmo Vietnam is Nguyễn Hoàng Phương Linh from Ho Chi Minh City, who was crowned on June 21, 2025, in Nha Trang.

== History ==
=== 2008 – 2022: Miss Universe Vietnam ===
In 2008, Công ty Cổ phần Hoàn vũ Nha Trang was granted the national license from the Miss Universe Organization to host the Miss Universe Vietnam competition under the Vietnamese name Hoa hậu Hoàn vũ Việt Nam.

The first edition of Miss Universe Vietnam was held at the Vinpearl Land resort in Nha Trang on May 31, 2008. It was the first official Miss Universe Vietnam contest. The contest took place at Diamond Bay, Nha Trang, with 20 contestants participating. The final included four competitions: evening gown, swimsuit, áo dài, and interview. The winner, Nguyễn Thùy Lâm, was host delegate for the Miss Universe 2008 pageant held July 14, 2008, also in Nha Trang.

After a 7-year hiatus, the Miss Universe Vietnam 2015 competition was held on October 3, 2015, at Crown Convention Center in Nha Trang, Vietnam, under the leadership of Công ty Cổ phần Hoàn vũ Sài Gòn (Unicorp). With the reboot, the winner of Miss Universe Vietnam will be crowned as the next year's Miss Universe Vietnam while one of the two Runners-up could be appointed as the following year's one if the pageant is not allowed to be held in time. Therefore, there have been two types of Miss Universe Vietnam since 2017. The crowned Miss Universe Vietnam will represent Vietnam at Miss Universe on even years while the appointed/granted Miss Universe Vietnam will represent the country on odd years.

From 2017, the pageant was accompanied by a reality television series called I Am Miss Universe Vietnam, in which contestants are put through different challenges and training programs in each weekly episode.

=== 2023 – present: Split from Miss Universe Vietnam, Rebranding to Miss Cosmo Vietnam and the establishment of Miss Cosmo ===
In 2023, the Miss Universe franchise in Vietnam was officially granted to a new national license holder. However, Hoa hậu Hoàn vũ Việt Nam was still continued to be held as a standalone pageant under the new title - Miss Cosmo Vietnam, separated from the new Miss Universe Vietnam competition. Due to the separation, the winner of Hoa hậu Hoàn vũ Việt Nam would no longer be Miss Universe Vietnam and on August 1, it was announced that the pageant would be rebranded to Miss Cosmo Vietnam and the accompanied reality television series was also rebranded to I Am Miss Cosmo Vietnam.

Further changes about the rebrand was late announced during the press release for the 2023 edition held on August 7, 2023, such as the discontinuation of the "Second Runner Up" title, the decision to no longer sending delegates to Miss Charm and the viewers would have the power to judge the contestants' performances throughout the final.

On August 12, 2023, Unicorp announced that they have established a new international pageant, namely Miss Cosmo, and the winner of Miss Cosmo Vietnam would become Vietnam's representative in this pageant.

== Titleholders ==
- Miss Universe Vietnam
- Miss Cosmo Vietnam

For the future editions of Miss Universe Vietnam after the split with Hoa hậu Hoàn vũ Việt Nam in 2023, see Miss Universe Vietnam.

Year	Winner	Runner Up		Theme	Venue	Number of contestants	Ref.
Year	Winner	First	Second	Theme	Venue	Number of contestants	Ref.
Miss Universe Vietnam (2008 – 2022)
2008	Nguyễn Thùy Lâm (Thái Bình)	Võ Hoàng Yến (Hồ Chí Minh City)	Dương Trương Thiên Lý (Đồng Tháp)		Vinpearl Event Hall, Nha Trang, Khánh Hòa	20	
2015	Phạm Thị Hương (Hải Phòng)	Ngô Trà My (Hà Nội)	Đặng Thị Lệ Hằng (Đà Nẵng)		Crown Convention Center, Nha Trang, Khánh Hòa	44	
2017	H'Hen Niê (Đắk Lắk)	Hoàng Thị Thùy (Thanh Hóa)	Mâu Thị Thanh Thủy (Hồ Chí Minh City)	Futurista	Crown Convention Center, Nha Trang, Khánh Hòa	42	
2019	Nguyễn Trần Khánh Vân (Hồ Chí Minh City)	Nguyễn Huỳnh Kim Duyên (Cần Thơ)	Phạm Hồng Thúy Vân (Hồ Chí Minh City)	Brave Heart	Crown Convention Center, Nha Trang, Khánh Hòa	44	
2022	Nguyễn Thị Ngọc Châu (Tây Ninh)	Lê Thảo Nhi (Hồ Chí Minh City)	Huỳnh Phạm Thủy Tiên (Đồng Tháp)	VINAWOMAN	Saigon Exhibition and Convention Center, District 7, Ho Chi Minh City	41	
Miss Cosmo Vietnam (2023 – present )
2023	Bùi Thị Xuân Hạnh (Ninh Bình)	Hoàng Thị Nhung (Hà Nội)		Made, Not Born	Tea Resort Prenn, Đà Lạt, Lâm Đồng	43	
2025	Nguyễn Hoàng Phương Linh (Hồ Chí Minh City)	Đỗ Cẩm Ly (Phú Thọ)		Shoot for the Moon	Paradise Resort, Nha Trang, Khánh Hòa	45	

=== Regional rankings ===
Province	Title	Year
Hồ Chí Minh City	2	2019, 2025
Ninh Bình	1	2023
Tây Ninh	1	2022
Đắk Lắk	1	2017
Hải Phòng	1	2015
Thái Bình	1	2008

== Gallery of winners ==
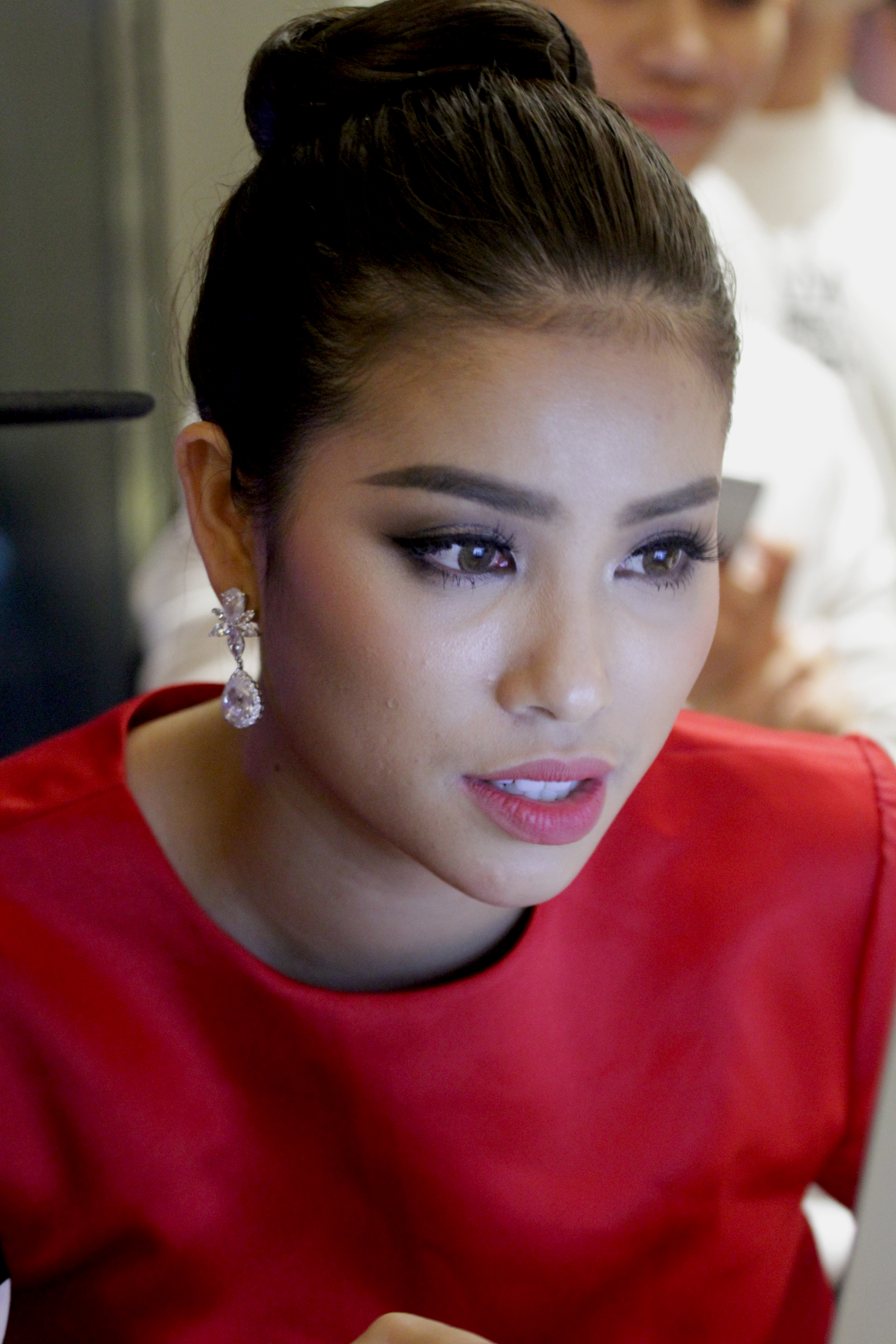
Miss Cosmo Vietnam 2015
Phạm Thị Hương
Hải Phòng

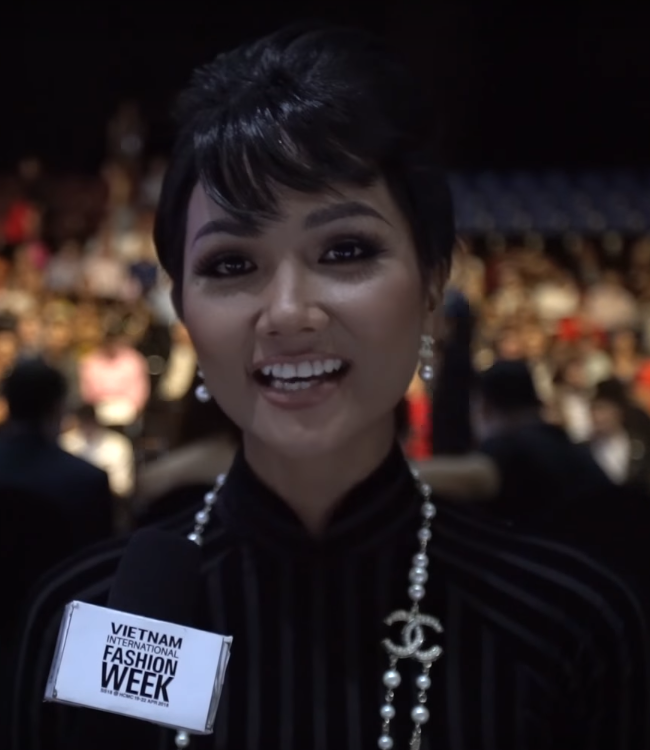
Miss Cosmo Vietnam 2017
H'Hen Niê
Đắk Lắk

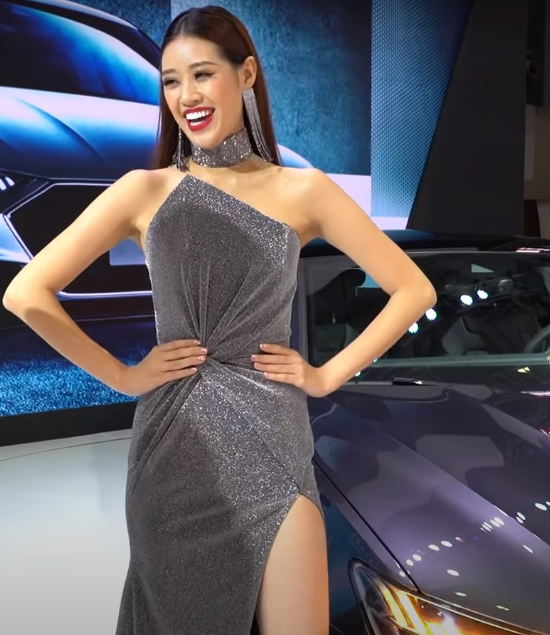
Miss Cosmo Vietnam 2019
Nguyễn Trần Khánh Vân
Hồ Chí Minh City

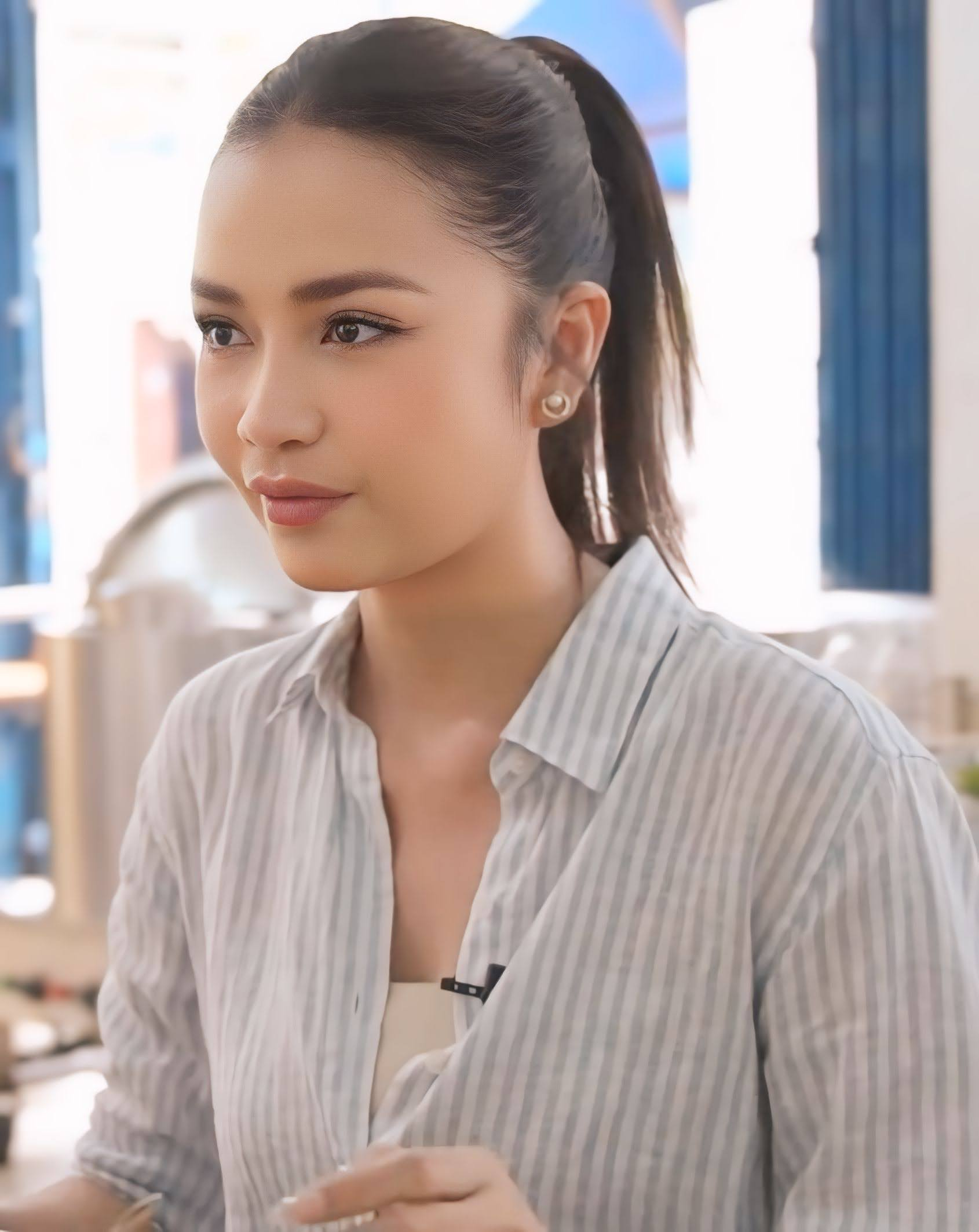
Miss Cosmo Vietnam 2022
Nguyễn Thị Ngọc Châu
Tây Ninh

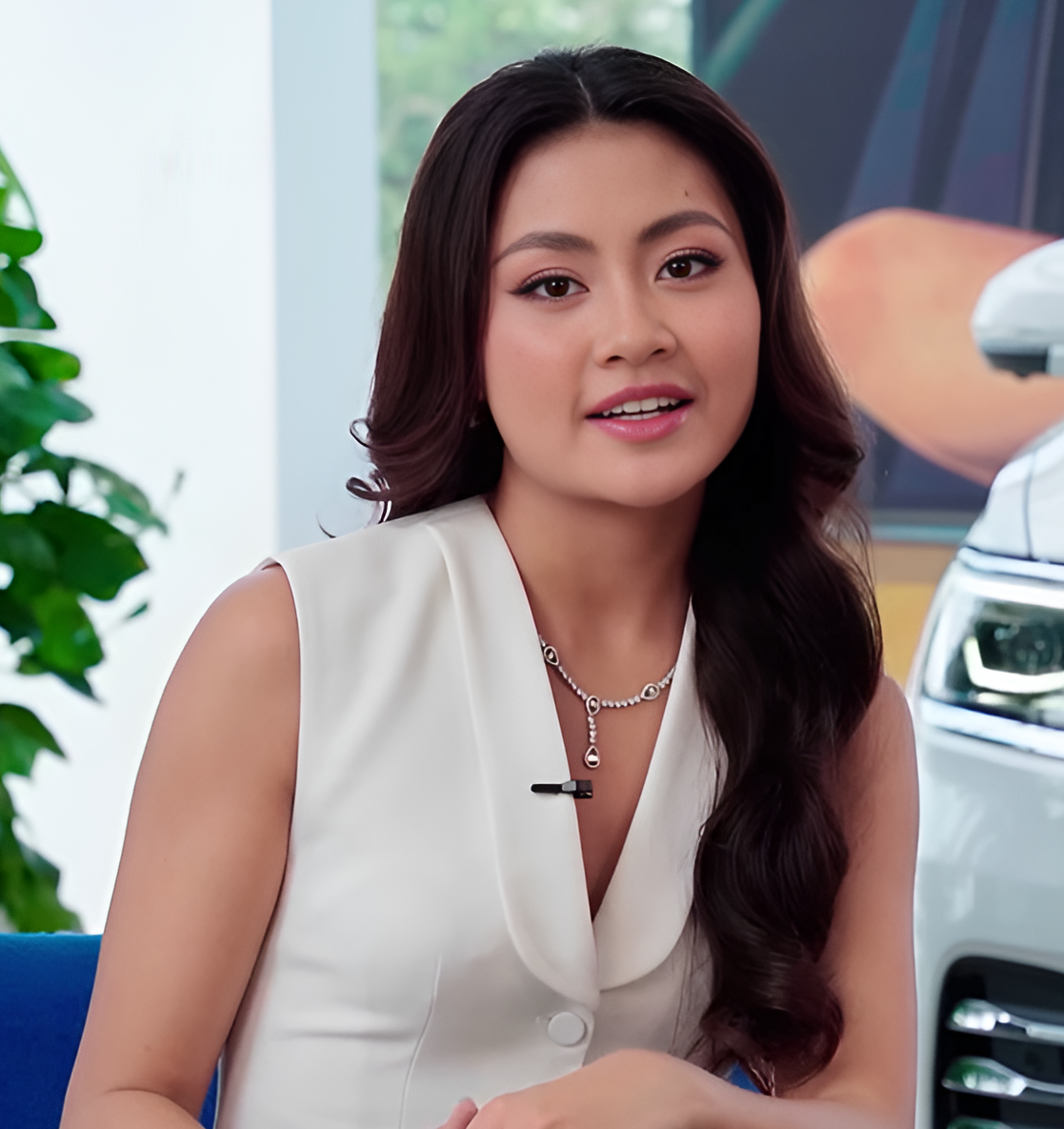
Miss Cosmo Vietnam 2023
Bùi Thị Xuân Hạnh
Ninh Bình

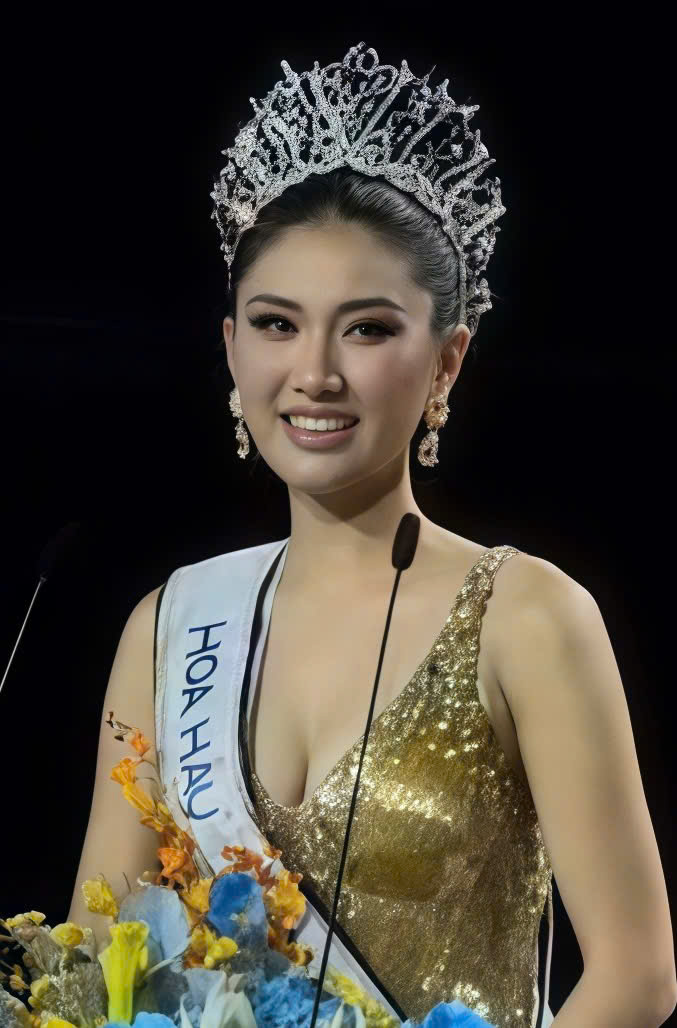
Miss Cosmo Vietnam 2025
Nguyễn Hoàng Phương Linh
Hồ Chí Minh City

== I Am Miss Cosmo Vietnam ==
I Am Miss Cosmo Vietnam
- The logo
- Also known as: I Am Miss Cosmo Vietnam
- Genre: Reality competition
- Presented by: Phạm Thị Hương (2017); H'Hen Niê (2019); Nguyễn Trần Khánh Vân (2022); Nguyễn Thị Ngọc Châu (2023)
- Country of origin: Vietnam
- Original languages: Vietnamese; English
- No. of seasons: 4
- No. of episodes: 30

Production
- Running time: 40-90 minutes
- Production companies: AVG (Formerly known as MobiTV); VTV; Unicorp; Multimedia JSC

Original release
- Network: MobiTV (2017); VTV6 (2017); VTV1 (2017-2019); VTV9 (2019-2022); VTV3 (2022)
- Release: September 30, 2017 – present

I Am Miss Cosmo Vietnam (formerly known as I Am Miss Universe Vietnam, Vietnamese: Tôi là Hoa hậu Hoàn vũ Việt Nam) is a companion show airing before the final night, starting with the 2017 edition.

On August 7, 2023, it was officially announced during the press release for the 2023 edition that the show was also renewed for the fourth season which is planned to be released in October on VTV.

=== Format ===
Each season of I Am Miss Cosmo Vietnam has 9 episodes, with the first episode being the casting episode to select the Top 60-70 contestants. The format of the show varies by season but usually, contestants are judged on their participation in challenges like TVC, interview, English interview, dining etiquette, etc. These challenges do not directly affect the results of the final night but serve as a way to increase the odd of winning the pageant.

==== Season 1 (2017) ====
There were typically a training class and 2-3 challenges in each episode. Only a number of contestants who performed well in the training class or the previous challenge were able to compete in the next challenge of the episode.

==== Season 3 (2022) ====
Each episode, the 10 contestants who scored the lowest in the challenge must take part in the elimination round, which usually tested their English, communication, and public speaking skills, to determine the 5 eliminated contestants. Also, it was announced that Võ Hoàng Yến was the recurring judge for this season.

In episode 2, it was announced that former runners-up Mâu Thị Thanh Thủy and Nguyễn Huỳnh Kim Duyên returned as mentors whose job is to lead team members in Team challenge and also judge each contestants in other challenges.

There are also 2 type of tickets being given to contestants in this season:

- Golden ticket: Appeared on Episode 1, 6 contestants who receive this ticket from one of the judges would automatically made it onto the Top 71. Additionally, an honorary golden ticket was given to the first transgender contestant, Đỗ Nhật Hà, by the organization.
- Silver ticket: Appeared on episode 6, 18 previously eliminated contestant have the chance to comeback by answering question judges. The 7 contestants who performed the best in this round would receive the ticket and earn their way back into the competition.

==== Season 4 (2023) ====
Similar to the first season, each episode started with a training class. After that, all contestants must take part in the Ranking Challenge to determine their Station (from A being the best to C being the worst) and the additional challenge they need to compete in the episode if needed. These additional challenges are:

- Cosmo Infinity Challenge: Only the contestant from Station A were able to compete in this challenge. The winner of this challenge would become the overall winner of the episode and receive an advantage which was triple the votes for 48 hours.
- Call-Out Challenge: The 3 contestants who performed the worst in the Ranking Challenge would be offered a chance to call out a contestant from Station B to swap their place by winning the battle against them. However, that contestant would be eliminated immediately if they lost the challenge and the called-out opponent would automatically be safe for the next episode.
- Elimination Challenge: After the Call-Out Challenge, all the contestants in Station C must take part in the elimination round, which usually tested their English, communication, and public speaking skills, to determine the eliminated contestants which was similar to the format of the last season.

=== Episodes ===
Season 1 (2017)

==== Episode 1: Tôi ước mơ ====
Original air date: September 30, 2017

70 contestants from both Northern and Southern Vietnam was selected through the audition process to become the official delegate for the 2017 edition.

==== Episode 2: Tôi tự tin ====
Original air date: October 7, 2017

Only the Top 22 contestants of the Training class were able to compete in the first challenge, before being further cut to 8 contestants in the second challenge.

- Training class: Confident in Pageantry Catwalk
- Training mentor: Võ Hoàng Yến
- First challenge: Catwalk on stairs in Evening Gown and introduce themselves
- Second challenge: Catwalk in National Costume and introduce themselves
- Special guest: Bùi Thị Mỹ Cảnh and Đặng Thị Lệ Hằng
- Winning contestant(s): Lê Thanh Tú
- Winning prize: Automatically made the cut for the second challenge in the next episode and a set of pearl jewelry from Long Beach Pearl

==== Episode 3: Tôi thanh lịch ====
Original air date: October 14, 2017

The 14 contestants who scored the highest in the first challenge alongside the winner of the last episode were able to compete in the Second challenge

- Training class: Etiquette
- Training mentor: Võ Thị Xuân Trang and Phạm Minh Hữu Tiến
- First challenge: Etiquette Dining Test
- Second challenge: Dining with Special Guest and Handle unexpected situations
- Special guest: Kyo York and Marcus Guilhem
- Winning contestant(s): Chu Thị Minh Trang
- Winning prize: Automatically made the cut for the second challenge in the next episode and gift vouchers worth 50.000.000VND from Belo Medical Spa & Clinic

==== Episode 4: Tôi phong cách ====
Original air date: October 21, 2017

The Top 34 contestants of the first challenge alongside the winner of the last episode were able to compete in the second challenge. These contestants are the divided into 7 style and only 2 contestants from each group advanced to the third challenge.

Also, Đặng Thị Lệ Hằng served as the special host for this episode and the next episode.

- Training class: Develop Personal Fashion style
- Training mentor: Minh Lộc and Trương Thanh Trúc
- First challenge: Makeup in the assigned style for 15 minutes in pairs
- Second challenge: Style a denim look in the assigned style to for 10 minutes
- Third challenge: Shoot a fashion lookbook in pairs
- Special guest: Phạm Văn Việt
- Winning team: Team Hoàng Thị Thùy & Mâu Thanh Thủy
- Winning prize: Automatically made the cut for the second challenge in Episode 6 and gift vouchers worth 20.000.000VND from Sixty-four

==== Episode 5: Tôi vì cộng đồng ====
Original air date: October 28, 2017

The contestants were split randomly into 7 teams to create a community service project. The 4 teams who earned the most points were able to compete in the second challenge.

- First challenge: Community mobilization
- Second challenge: Present their ideas in front of a professional panel
- Special guest: Lương Thị Cẩm Tú, Võ Thị Tuyết Nga, Nguyễn Thị Loan and Lê Phước Lập.
- Winning team: Team Nguyễn Thị Ngọc Anh, Đỗ Nguyễn Như Huỳnh, Lê Thị Ánh Minh, Hoàng Như Ngọc, Nguyễn Thị Ngọc Nữ, Nguyễn Thị Thanh Trang, Lê Thanh Tú, Nguyễn Diễm Uyên & Đỗ Lan Vy
- Winning prize: 141.000.000VND from the organization's charity fund and 200.000.000VND from Nam A Bank

==== Episode 6: Tôi bản lĩnh ====
Original air date: November 11, 2017

From this episode, only the Top 45 contestants who made the cut earlier in the Preliminary Competition would continue. The Top 8 contestants of the first challenge alongside the winner of Episode 4 were able to compete in the second challenge. Also, the top 3 of the first challenge (Hoàng Lan, Nguyễn Phương Hoa and Vũ Thị Tuyết Trang) also received full scholarship for the Harvard ManageMentor course provided by Wall Street English.

- Training class: English
- Training mentor: Vũ Thị Hoàng My, Robert Steven Tarangelo and Trevor
- First challenge: Interview in English
- Second challenge: TVC for Elise in pairs
- Special guest: Michel Le Quellec, Connor Steelberg, Amie Blue and Lưu Nga
- Winning team: Team Đỗ Lan Vy & Vũ Thị Tuyết Trang
- Winning prize: Automatically made the cut for the second challenge in Episode 8 and an experienced trip to Seoul, South Korea to with Lưu Nga and Phạm Thị Hương

==== Episode 7: Hành trình thiện nguyện ====
Original air date: November 18, 2017

This is a non-competitive episode, as it showcased the contestants helping local people after the damage caused by Typhoon Damrey.

==== Episode 8: Tôi quyến rũ ====
Original air date: November 25, 2017

For the first challenge, the contestants were randomly split into 5 teams. The winning team would get a trip for 4 days 3 nights and the opportunities to compete in the second challenge with the winners of Episode 6.

Also, Dương Trương Thiên Lý served as the special host for this episode.

- Training class: Fitness
- Training mentor: Dương Thanh
- First challenge: Obstacle course racing
- Second challenge: Fashion film for Sixty-four
- Special guest: Đoàn Ngọc Phương Vy and Phạm Văn Việt
- Winning contestant(s): Lê Thị Ngọc Út and Vũ Thị Tuyết Trang
- Winning prize: Gift vouchers worth 20.000.000VND from Sixty-four

==== Episode 9: Tôi tỏa sáng ====
Original air date: December 2, 2017

Season 2 (2019)

==== Episode 1: Tôi dũng cảm ====
Original air date: October 4, 2019

60 contestants from both Northern and Southern Vietnam was selected through the audition process to become the official delegate for the 2019 edition.

==== Episode 2: Tôi thần thái ====
Original air date: October 11, 2019

- Winning contestant(s): Đào Thị Hà

==== Episode 3: Tôi phong cách ====
Original air date: October 18, 2019

- Winning contestant(s): Đào Thị Hà

==== Episode 4: Tôi thanh lịch - Tôi hội nhập ====
Original air date: October 25, 2019

- Winning contestant(s): Vũ Quỳnh Trang

==== Episode 5: Tôi vì cộng đồng ====
Original air date: November 1, 2019

- Winning contestant(s): Nguyễn Diana

==== Episode 6: Đại sứ du lịch 4.0 ====
Original air date: November 8, 2019

- Winning contestant(s): Phạm Hồng Thúy Vân

==== Episode 7: Tôi tỏa sáng ====
Original air date: November 15, 2019

- Winning contestant(s): Phạm Hồng Thúy Vân

==== Episode 8: Tôi khỏe đẹp - quyến rũ ====
Original air date: November 22, 2019

- Winning contestant(s): Phạm Hồng Thúy Vân

==== Episode 9: Tôi bản lĩnh ====
Original air date: November 29, 2019

- Winning contestant(s): Nguyễn Diana
Season 3 (2022)

==== Episode 1: Catch Your Chance ====
Original air date: April 16, 2022

71 contestants from both Northern and Southern Vietnam was selected through the audition process to become the official delegate for the 2022 edition, with 7 of them automatically made the cut by receiving the Golden Ticket during the audition process.

- Golden Ticket receivers: Nguyễn Võ Ngọc Anh, Nguyễn Thị Ngọc Châu, Nguyễn Thị Phương Thảo, Đặng Thu Huyền, Lê Thảo Nhi, Đỗ Nhật Hà and Nguyễn Hoàng Yến

==== Episode 2: Wear Your Sash ====
Original air date: April 23, 2022

- Winning contestant(s): Huỳnh Phạm Thủy Tiên
- Eliminated contestant(s): Nguyễn Thanh Thanh and Lê Ngọc Phương Thảo

==== Episode 3: Walk Your Way ====
Original air date: April 30, 2022

- Winning contestant(s): Nguyễn Thị Phương Thảo
- Winning team: Team Kim Duyên
- Eliminated contestant(s): Nguyễn Thu Hằng, Hoàng Thị Hải Hà, Huỳnh Minh Thiên Hương, Nguyễn Thị Ngọc Tuyết and Phạm Thị Kim Vui

==== Episode 4: Own Your Stage ====
Original air date: May 7, 2022

- Winning contestant(s): Nguyễn Hoàng Yến and Nguyễn Thị Lệ Nam
- Winning team: Team Mâu Thuỷ
- Eliminated contestant(s): Hoàng Thị Thanh Dược and Phạm Thị Minh Huệ

==== Episode 5: Share Your Hands ====
Original air date: May 14, 2022

- Winning team: Team Mâu Thuỷ
- Eliminated contestant(s): Nguyễn Trương Ánh Hồng and Trần Hoàng Yến

==== Episode 6: Raise Your Voice ====
Original air date: May 21, 2022

- Winning team: Hồ Nguyễn Quỳnh Anh, Đàng Vương Huyền Trân, Lê Thị Trúc Đào, Nguyễn Thị Hồng Ngọc, Lê Phan Hạnh Nguyên, Đặng Thị Hồng Anh & Lý Tú Chi
- Winning contestant(s): Nguyễn Anh Khuê and Lê Hoàng Phương
- Eliminated contestant(s): Lưu Phương Anh, Lê Thùy Linh, Bùi Thùy Nhiên and Nguyễn Đình Khánh Phương

==== Episode 7: Face Your Fear ====
Original air date: May 28, 2022

- Winning contestant(s): Bùi Quỳnh Hoa
- Winning team: Team Kim Duyên
- Eliminated contestant(s): Hồ Nguyễn Quỳnh Anh, Lê Thị Trúc Đào, Hồ Vương Linh, Thạch Thu Thảo and Huỳnh Đào Diễm Trinh

==== Episode 8: Shine Your Light ====
Original air date: June 4, 2022

- Winning contestant(s): Nguyễn Thị Hương Ly
- Eliminated contestant(s): Đặng Thị Hồng Anh, Hoàng Thùy Anh, Lê Như Thùy, Nguyễn Thị Thanh Thùy and Nguyễn Hoàng Yến

==== Episode 9: Be a Vinawoman ====
Original air date: June 11, 2022

- Winning contestant(s): Bùi Lý Thiên Hương
- Eliminated contestant(s): Tô Mai Thùy Dương, Bùi Thị Linh, Vũ Thanh Phương, Nguyễn Hoàng Bảo Trân and Đàng Vương Huyền Trân
Season 4 (2023)

==== Episode 1: Cosmo Pass ====
Original air date: October 27, 2023

59 contestants was selected to become the official delegate for the 2023 edition after competing in the Walk The Talk and the Swimsuit round of the nationwide audition process. Many of them automatically made the cut by receiving the Cosmo Pass after the Walk The Talk round, hence they did not have to compete in the Swimsuit round. Also, the winner of the Online Photo competition also earned a direct spot in the Top 59 without the need to compete in both rounds of the audition process.

- Winner of the Online Photo competition: Bùi Thị Thanh Thủy
- Cosmo Pass receivers: Bùi Thị Xuân Hạnh, Cao Thị Thiên Trang, Đậu Hải Minh Anh, Đỗ Thị Minh Tâm, Hoàng Thị Nhung, Huỳnh Đào Diễm Trinh, Kiều Thị Thúy Hằng, Ngô Bảo Ngọc, Trương Thanh Diễm and Vũ Thúy Quỳnh

==== Episode 2: Cosmo Space ====
Original air date: November 4, 2023

Call-Out Challenge Results
Station C Contestant	Result	Station B Contestants	Result
Hồ Nguyễn Kiều Oanh	Lost	Lê Ngọc Phương Thảo	Won
Nguyễn Thị Hồng Mỹ	Lost	Lý Thị Linh	Won

- Training class: Self-Introduction
- Training mentor: Nguyễn Thị Thu Hoài and Kathy Uyên
- Special guest: Nguyễn Hương Giang, Bùi Đức Bảo and Đặng Dương Thanh Thanh Huyền
- Ranking challenge: Introduce themselves in groups
- Cosmo Infiniy challenge: Role-playing Chessboard (A four-stage speaking contest)
- Winner of the Cosmo Infiniy Challenge: Phan Lê Hoàng An
- Eliminated contestant(s) from the Call-Out Challenge: Nguyễn Thị Hồng Mỹ and Hồ Nguyễn Kiều Oanh
- Eliminated contestant(s) from the Elimination Challenge: None

==== Episode 3: Cosmo Look ====
Original air date: November 11, 2023

- Training class: Catwalk
- Training mentor: Vũ Thu Phương and Huỳnh Phạm Thủy Tiên
- Special guest: Mâu Thị Thanh Thủy
- Ranking challenge: Catwalk in groups
- Cosmo Infiniy challenge: 10-second TVC for Volkswagen, including a 3-second slowmotion part
- Winner of the Cosmo Infiniy Challenge: Bùi Thị Xuân Hạnh
- Quit: Lê Thị Yến Ngọc
- Eliminated contestant(s) from the Elimination Challenge: Lê Huỳnh Ni

== See also ==
- List of Vietnam representatives at international women beauty pageants
