= Mâu Thủy =

Vietnamese model

Mâu Thị Thanh Thủy
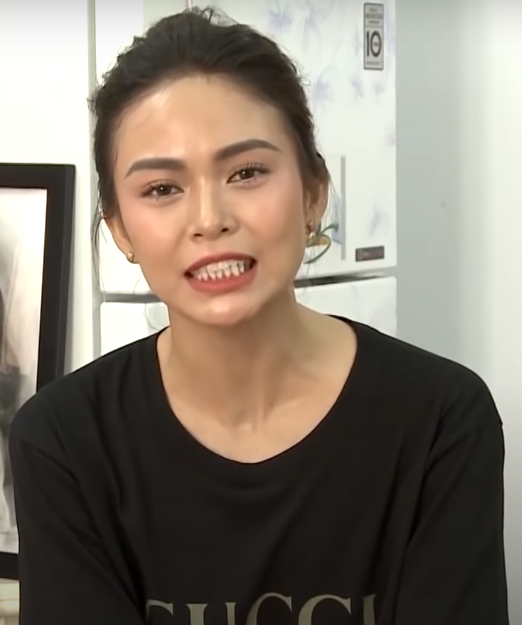
- Mâu Thủy at BEE Entertainment
- Born: 2 May 1992 (age 34); Ho Chi Minh City, Vietnam
- Other name: Mâu Thủy
- Occupation: Model
- Years active: 2012–
- Known for: Winner of Vietnam's Next Top Model season 4; The second runner-up of Miss Universe Vietnam 2017
- Title: Vietnam's Next Top Model
- Modeling information
- Height: 1.77 m (5 ft 9 1/2 in)
- Hair color: Black
- Eye color: Black

Mâu Thị Thanh Thủy (born May 2, 1992) known professionally as Mâu Thủy, is a Vietnamese model. She won Vietnam's Next Top Model season 4, then won the title of the second runner-up of Miss Universe Vietnam 2017.

== Artistry ==
Mâu Thủy was born on May 2, 1992, in Ho Chi Minh City, when she first attended Miss Vietnam 2012 and stopped after the southern final round.

In 2013, she won the title of Champion of Vietnam's Next Top Model contest. In 2014, she was on the list of the 10 most searched female artists in Vietnam on the Google platform, ranked 5th. In 2017, she attended Miss Universe Vietnam 2017 and achieved the title of the second runner-up.

=== Examiner ===
In 2019, she became a coach of Model Kid Vietnam 2019 with Hương Ly, Tuyết Lan, TydH Thùy Dương and Miss Universe Vietnam 2019 with Minh Tú. In 2020 and 2021, she will be a judge at Aquafina Fashion Week (Vietnam's largest fashion catwalk) along with Hương Ly, Quỳnh Anh and TydH Thùy Dương.

In 2021, she was a judge on The Next Face Vietnam along with Lương Thùy Linh and H'Hen Niê, however due to work commitments she could not participate, her replacement was TydH Thùy Dương. In 2022, she and Kim Duyên are judges for Miss Universe Vietnam 2022. In 2024, she was a judge on The Next Gentleman with Ngô Thị Quỳnh Mai, Hoàng Thùy, Hương Ly.

Along with Võ Hoàng Yến and Nam Trung are judges of Vietnam's Next Top Model season 9, but she later withdrew due to the extended delay caused by the COVID-19 pandemic.

== TV show ==
Year	Program	Role	Broadcast on
2012	Miss Vietnam	Candidates	VTV3
2013	Vietnam's Next Top Model season 4	Candidates	VTV3
2015	Vietnam's Next Top Model season 6	Guest judge episode 1	VTV3
2016	The Amazing Race Vietnam	Key player	VTV6
2017	Miss Universe Vietnam	Candidates	VTV6
2018	Người bí ẩn season 5	Player episode 6	HTV7
2019	Người bí ẩn season 6	Player episode 1	HTV7
2019	Miss Universe Vietnam	Mentor	VTV9
2019	Vietnam Why Not	Player	VTV9
2019	Model Kid Vietnam	Mentor	BeU Channel
2020	Aquafina Fashion Week	Judge	BeU Channel
2022	Miss Universe Vietnam	Mentor	VTV9
2024	The Next Gentleman	Mentor	TBA

Awards and achievements
Preceded by Mai Thị Giang	Vietnam's Next Top Model; 2013	Succeeded by Tạ Quang Hùng; Nguyễn Thị Oanh
Preceded by Đặng Thị Lệ Hằng	2nd Runner-Up Miss Universe Vietnam; 2017	Succeeded by Phạm Hồng Thúy Vân
