= Vietnam's Next Top Model season 2 =

Vietnam's Next Top Model
- Season 2

Release
- Original network: Multimedia JSC (domestically); VTV (domestically); CBS Television Distribution (internationally)
- Original release: September 25, 2011 – January 8, 2012

Season chronology
- ← Previous; Cycle 1 Next → Cycle 3

Vietnam's Next Top Model, Cycle 2 is the second season of Vietnam's Next Top Model to be produced again by Vietnam Television and Multimedia JSC. The show is set to air on VTV3, at every Sunday primetime (8:00 pm UTC+7) from September 25, 2011 to January 8, 2012. There are 14 episodes.

For the first time in VNTM, the creator of Top Model franchise, Tyra Banks appeared as a special guest judge in the final show on January 8, 2012.

The winner was 19-year-old Hoàng Thị Thùy from Thanh Hóa.

== Overview ==
=== Casting process ===
Requirements and schedule

To be able to audition for the contest, future contestants must be taller than 5' 6" (168 cm) - a higher standard than the first cycle's, aged between 18 and 25. To qualify, they also have to be Vietnamese citizen currently in Vietnam who have not had modelling experience nor been under management by agencies.

For syndication, VNTM will be broadcast on Sundays primetime as opposed to the previous schedule of Thursdays.

Panel renewed

In late July 2011, Multimedia began announcements of changes in judging panel. The whole new judges will be revealed through every 8-hour cryptic hints from 18:15 pm Monday August 1 via the official page on Facebook; the longer it takes audience to decode these puzzles, the less the chance to earn gifts is, the clearer the judges are revealed.

Order	Hint(s)	Apparently Hidden Judge(s)
1	[Multiple choices] Of whom the 2011 panel comprises: 1. An actor/actress 2. A former model 3. A supermodel 4. A photographer 5. A make-up artist 6. A fashion stylist	Unknown
2	Among top make-up artists in Vietnam	Unknown
3	The make-up artist used to feature on an editorial of fashion magazine	Unknown
4	The make-up artist is capable of giving "sharp" criticisms and being extremely sincere. Friends consider him: "Passionate".	Unknown
5	Often enhance or alter the appearance of celebrities, such as Thanh Thảo, Ngô Thanh Vân, Hiền Thục, etc.	Unknown
6	A noted fashion photographer	Unknown
7	The photographer is also a journalist	Unknown
8	It's the photographer who is always welcome and is trusted by many Vietnamese stars	Unknown
9	Among judges is a stylist as well	Unknown
10	Among judges is a professional model	Unknown
11	Among judges is a model who is also a singer	Unknown
12	Among judges is also an actor/actress	Unknown
13	One of them recently served as a fashion designer	Unknown
14	You imagine how many judges there are in the panel, don't you?	Unknown
15	"My inspirations for designing come naturally from life", as quoted Originally: "Cảm hứng thiết kế của tôi đến tự nhiên từ trong cuộc sống"	Đỗ Mạnh Cường
16	One of them used to collaborate with the series Vietnam's Next Top Model 2010	Unknown
17	The panel consists of 3 main judges alongside sidekick judges, including a very popular designer	Unknown
18	One said: "As a designer if you can't beautify even yourself, then you can't beautify another". Originally: "Đã là một nhà thiết kế thì nếu anh không làm đẹp được cho chính bản thân thì sẽ không thể làm đẹp được cho người khác"	Đỗ Mạnh Cường
19	One said: "Only one thing I need is simply the inspiration, is simply the emotion... so as not to turn myself into a professional make-up machine or a painter that applies cosmetics... [to face]" Originally: "Điều chúng tôi cần duy nhất, đơn giản là cảm hứng, là cảm xúc... để không biến mình thành những cái máy hay thợ vẽ chuyên nghiệp chuyên tô son trát phấn..."	Nam Trung
20	One used to work as an interpreter prior to doing the current job	Unknown
21	Main and recurring judges at the time of posting [this] hint are: a make-up artist, a photographer, a designer, a model and a host/head judge	Unknown
22	All members of the main panel (excluding recurring judges) are present in this image as illustrated Shortlist: Ngô Thanh Vân, former model & singer & actress / Xuân Lan, former model / Hà Anh, model / Quỳnh Thy, model / Hoàng Yến, model / make-up artist Nam Trung / designer Công Trí / photographer Phạm Hoài Nam	Unknown
23	One has been a supermodel	Unknown
24	And then "Powerful Three" of the competition becomes "Powerful Four"	Unknown
25	Now Powerful Four: a make-up artist, a photographer, a designer, a supermodel	Unknown
26	The other image, as illustrated	All Revealed: Xuân Lan; Nam Trung; Phạm Hoài Nam; Công Trí

According to reports from the page, there are 3 regular judges (frontmen) and some recurring ones as well. First two unveiled are designer Đỗ Mạnh Cường and make-up artist Nam Trung via their famous quotes. Then by hint no.22 (a picture) Đỗ Mạnh Cường is not officially a main judge. The host position at which Hà Anh got was kept secret. Hopefuls for replacing Hà Anh are Hồ Ngọc Hà, Ngô Thanh Vân, Xuân Lan, etc. As an ultimate consequence, Xuân Lan takes the host role over Hà Anh, leads the panel with Nam Trung and Phạm Hoài Nam. Đỗ Mạnh Cường was also introduced the fourth judge due to a number opening.

Vietnam's Next Top Model is a place for seeking and training girls truly having desires to turn into professional models. By that, I choose this place to convey my all enthusiasm to fashion, modelling career in Vietnam.

— Xuân Lan, report from VnExpress

=== Development, production and marketing ===
Right at the end of the first-season finale, it was confirmed that the show has been renewed for a second season. Future contestants can apply for the second cycle with requirement as mentioned above. Production was stated to start from March 2011. All the application forms must be sent by June 2011.

XoneFM, owned by VOV, joins hands to promote the program's audition dates and launch during many of its programs.

=== Auditions ===
Open auditions will be held in the following cities:

Audition City	Date		Venue
Audition City	Open	Callback	Venue
Ho Chi Minh City	August 16, 2011	August 17&18	Riverside Palace
Hanoi	August 23, 2011	August 24&25	The Garden Shopping Center (open); InterContinental Hanoi Westlake (callback)

After audition process for 2011 ended, new process for 2012 kicks off. Applicants have approximately a year to apply forms.

Online Photo Model

Besides auditioning as usual, contestants were recruited from two new methods. The first one is Online Photo Model contest. The winners after several rounds of gaining votes would be through to the semifinals. As of the beginning of casting process, six girls have been picked.

Hunting Model

Hunting Model was the other event in which selected audience prominently on behalf of producers had the right to invite featured candidates in ordinary life for auditioning.

=== Prizes ===
The winner this year will receive:

- A modelling contract with BeU Model Management worth 1,000,000,000₫ (approximately $50,000)
- A cover and a spread on Her World magazine together with 200,000,000₫ in cash (~$9,600)
- A VIP Diamond Membership card at California Fitness & Yoga Center for 2 year worth 300,000,000₫ (~$14,400)
- A trip to Paris for training and herself finding international agency supported by Bourjois cosmetics
- A gift from Samsung (include a smart TV, a Galaxy 10.1 tablet & a MV800 camera)

== Contestants ==
(ages stated are at start of filming)

For Vietnamese names, the family name stand(s) first, the given name stands last and the middle name is between them and right next to the given name. According to Vietnamese custom, these people should be called by given name only or middle name + given name when given names are the same. For example: Phan Ngọc Phương Nghi should be called simply Nghi or formally Phương Nghi. However, Lê Thị Thúy should be called Lê Thúy because Thị is not considered a formal middle name.

Contestant	Age	Height	Hometown	Finish	Place
Lưu Khánh Linh	17	1.77 m (5 ft 9 1/2 in)	Haiphong	Episode 4	15
Minh Thuy 'Kikki' Le	21	1.74 m (5 ft 8 1/2 in)	Malmö, Sweden	Episode 5	14
Huỳnh Thị Kim Tuyền	20	1.70 m (5 ft 7 in)	Cần Thơ	Episode 6	13
Dương Thị Dung	23	1.76 m (5 ft 9 1/2 in)	Bắc Giang	Episode 7	12
Phan Ngọc Phương Nghi	19	1.81 m (5 ft 11 1/2 in)	Ho Chi Minh City	Episode 8	11-10
Nguyễn Thị Hoàng Oanh	24	1.72 m (5 ft 7 1/2 in)	Ho Chi Minh City	Episode 8	11-10
Nguyễn Thùy Dương	20	1.74 m (5 ft 8 1/2 in)	Ho Chi Minh City	Episode 9	9
Lê Thị Phương	20	1.73 m (5 ft 8 in)	Thanh Hóa	Episode 10	8-7
Trần Thanh Thủy	21	1.77 m (5 ft 9 1/2 in)	Khánh Hòa	Episode 10	8-7
Nguyễn Thị Tuyết †	18	1.75 m (5 ft 9 in)	Hanoi	Episode 11	6
Nguyễn Thị Phương Anh	22	1.74 m (5 ft 8 1/2 in)	Hanoi	Episode 12	5
Nguyễn Thị Thùy Trang	22	1.77 m (5 ft 9 1/2 in)	Đắk Lắk	Episode 13	4
Lê Thị Thúy	20	1.80 m (5 ft 11 in)	Quảng Bình	Episode 14	3
Nguyễn Thị Trà My	19	1.78 m (5 ft 10 in)	Hanoi	Episode 14	2
Hoàng Thị Thùy	19	1.76 m (5 ft 9 1/2 in)	Thanh Hóa	Episode 14	1

== Episode summaries ==
=== Pre-show: Online Photo Model ===
Many girls can be a semi-finalist by joining Online Photo Model contests, which are also included to Top Model. Candidates upload the five best shots and get votes via SMS or online voting. As a result, six girls have been advanced through semifinal stage.

- Advanced 1st: Nguyễn Võ Út Phượng; Lương Thị Sao Mai & Hoàng Thị Quỳnh Như (Concept: The Banquet)
- Advanced 2nd: Phan Thị Thu Nga, Ngô Hiền Trang & Nguyễn Thị Hoàng Oanh (Concept: Alice in Wonderland)

=== Casting episodes ===
Casting process began with a huge surprise as expected. The whole new judging panel was introduced, namely former model and fashion icon Xuân Lan, noted fashion photographer Phạm Hoài Nam, fashion designer Đỗ Mạnh Cường and celebrity make-up artist Nam Trung joined as well.

Air date: September 25 & October 2, 2011

Southern area: after first cut from hundreds of girls, 81 are through to the next casting day. In the second day, 44 survived and then 10 girls were advanced to semi-final round. Quý Dung, who was last year semifinalist, didn't make it this year.

- Notable faces: Nguyễn Thị Hoàng Oanh & Nguyễn Võ Út Phượng (who were advanced via Online Photo Model), Nguyễn Quý Dung (last year semifinalist)
- Through to Semifinal round: Phan Ngọc Phương Nghi, Trần Thanh Thủy, Phan Thị Thùy Linh, Nguyễn Bích Trâm, Nguyễn Thị Hoàng Oanh, Nguyễn Thị Thùy Trang, Huỳnh Thị Kim Tuyền, Nguyễn Thùy Dương, Kikki Lê, Lê Thị Thúy

Northern area: 79 girls were through the first round. 22 made it through the third round cut from 44. Unexpectedly, more than 10 girls are chosen.

- Notable faces: Lương Thị Sao Mai & Hoàng Thị Quỳnh Như (who were advanced via Online Photo Model)
- Through to Semifinal round: Lê Vũ Hải Anh, Nguyễn Thị Phương Anh, Dương Thị Dung, Nguyễn Thị Hương, Trần Thị Hương, Lưu Khánh Linh, Nguyễn Thị Trà My, Nguyễn Thị Ngân, Lê Thị Phương, Hoàng Thị Thùy, & Nguyễn Thị Tuyết

=== Episode 3 ===
Air date: October 09, 2011

Over 20 girls have their first meeting in Ho Chi Minh City, where they should try their best to qualify because at the end of the week only 15 girls survive and officially move to Top Model house. The girls departed late for Thúy's arriving late related to a car accident.

The first challenge of this cycle was to learn how to walk properly as a top model herself, and the coach was no other than the head judge Xuan Lan. During rehearsal, Lê Thúy sprained her ankle but it did not prevent her from going on runway challenge. Later, she won the reward challenge for her attempt regardless of perfect walk.

For the photo shoot, the girls wearing outfits designed by Kelly Bui once again performed their catwalk. Nguyễn Tuyết surprisingly impressed all the judges and she was first called out in this week.

- Featured designer: Kelly Bùi

=== Episode 4 ===
Air date: October 16, 2011

The judges selected 15 girls moved to their official house at Saigon Pearl. First conflict was stirred up in the house regarding 5 beds for 15 girls.

The challenge of this week was to do catwalk on a busy street's pedestrian crossing. Lê Thúy's pain let her down and she was transferred to hospital. Later, expectantly, Hoàng Thuỳ was announced as a winner of the challenge.

For the week's photo shoot, the girls were told to portray their beauty and pride by using the image of the white rose. Hoàng Oanh and Hoàng Thùy both excelled while the others did not impress the judge. Lê Phương and Lưu Khánh Linh were in the bottom two, and Khánh Linh was sent home even though she was one of the judge's favorites during the casting.

- First call-out: Nguyễn Thị Hoàng Oanh
- Bottom two: Lê Thị Phương & Lưu Khánh Linh
- Eliminated: Lưu Khánh Linh
- Featured designer: Quỳnh Paris

=== Episode 5 ===
Air date: October 23, 2011

The girls received a mail from Xuan Lan saying that a top model is required to have a strong health. Therefore, with the help of California Fitness and Yoga Center's, the girls learnt some Yoga techniques which will be useful later for their modeling career.

For this week's challenge, the girls were divided into pairs and competed with the others to see who is capable of sensing music most. Kim Tuyền outshined the other girls and was declared the winner. Return home the atmosphere got uncomfortable. Lê Phương heard Thùy Dương told not to allow a set of roommates Kim Tuyền, Nguyễn Tuyết, Phương Anh and Hoàng Thùy to enjoy dinner with the rest of the house for their laziness. Kim Tuyền struck out and decided not to put herself on the dining room with them until conflicts was solved. After that, the girls went on a very serious conversation. Lê Thúy showed her very disappointment at Lê Phương's talkativeness while Thùy Dương shouted out loud against Phương Anh and Hoàng Thùy. Thùy Trang stood up and brought out solutions in order to get every single person to compromise. For their photo shoot, the girls pose in group in Discothèque theme. They had to embody different characteristics below:

Group	Emotion
Lê Phương, Hoàng Oanh, Thanh Thủy & Thùy Dương	Beloved
Phương Nghi, Dương Dung & Nguyễn Tuyết	Envious
Kikki Lê, Kim Tuyền, Lê Thuý & Hoàng Thùy	Sharing
Phương Anh, Trà My & Thùy Trang	Isolated

During evaluation, Phương Anh and Thùy Trang was praised, as the judges was impressed with their chemistry in group shot. On the other hand, Kikki was criticized for awkward mouth while Thùy Dương was harshly mentioned her unprofessional attitude towards make-up artist. That made both land to the bottom two. However, Kikki Le was eliminated for her lack of facial flexibility.

- First call-out: Nguyễn Thị Phương Anh
- Bottom two: Kikki Le & Nguyễn Thùy Dương
- Eliminated: Kikki Le

=== Episode 6 ===
Air date: October 30, 2011

During this episode, the girls traveled to Mano Mano salon for their makeovers. While most of them liked their new looks, Hoàng Oanh got a bit emotional about her new short hair. After the makeover, the girls were immediately sent to the studio and challenged to take a photoshoot with mice and hamsters. Phương Anh burst into tears while doing her shoot; however, she managed to overcome her fear very well. Therefore, Phương Anh was selected to be the winner of this week's challenge because of her bravery.

On the occasion of Halloween, this week's elimination shoot was all about the mysterious and spooky theme. Most of the girls were terrified when they knew that they had to take their photoshoot with five tarantulas. Some managed to do really well, but the others just let their fear take over their confidences. At panel, Trà My, Dương Dung, and Lê Thuý's photos showed the judges their tremendous improvements. Kim Tuyền, on the other hand, was criticized for her lack of emotion and adaptability.

Kim Tuyền and Thanh Thủy landed in the bottom two, both for their unsatisfied photos. The judges decided that Thanh Thủy had more potential, so Kim Tuyền was sent home.

- First call-out: Hoàng Thùy
- Bottom two: Kim Tuyền & Thanh Thủy
- Eliminated: Kim Tuyền
- Featured designer: Đỗ Mạnh Cường

=== Episode 7 ===
Air date: November 06, 2011

In this week's episode, the girls went to a small theater where they learnt how to move their bodies and be flexible as much as they can. Thùy Trang and Hoàng Oanh, both were collapsed during the practice due to their lack of exercise.

This week's challenge for the girls was to dress up as high fashion mannequins and then, pose inside a crowded mall as well as on a busy street. Most of the girls were distracted by the people passing by; only Thùy Dương was praised for her ability to highly concentrate on doing the challenge, so she was announced the winner.

For the evaluation photos, the girls had to pose underwater and all but Lê Thúy got criticized right on the set for not being confident and focusing. At panel, while Nguyễn Tuyết and Lê Phương's photos amazed the judges, Phương Nghi, Lê Thúy, and Dương Dung's poor performances extremely disappointed them. Lê Thúy and Dương Dung land in the bottom two, but Lê Thúy is given another chance and Dương Dung is eliminated for appearing to lack improvement.

- First call-out: Nguyễn Thị Tuyết
- Bottom two: Lê Thị Thúy & Dương Thị Dung
- Eliminated: Dương Thị Dung
- Featured designer: Lý Quý Khánh

=== Episode 8 ===
Air date: November 20, 2011

The girls were once again told the importance of strut. Xuân Lan gave the girls another balance-keeping challenge. Nguyễn Tuyết was deemed the winner with the shortest time performing challenge.

For this week's photo shoot, the girls covered under fabrics had to strike as many creative poses as they can. The versatility of face expression and body stretch were, hence, mainly considered during evaluation. Lê Phương and Lê Thúy wowed the judges with their tremendously beautiful photos. Lê Thúy's photos were a lot more energized compared to her last week's photo; therefore, she was the first call-out. On the other hand, Thanh Thủy and Phương Nghi were being criticized again for not making any progress; Hoàng Oanh's worse performance was also mentioned. As a result, after one week unaired, double elimination occurred. Hoàng Oanh landed in bottom three with Thanh Thủy and Phương Nghi as well for the judges felt that her photo did not meet their expectations. In the end, Phương Nghi and Hoàng Oanh were eliminated even though Hoàng Oanh had many strong photos in previous episodes.

After the broadcast, Hoàng Oanh felt the elimination of this week quite unreasonable. She said that even though her photo this week was not strong, her performances throughout the competition were much better than Thủy's. She even tweeted on Facebook saying that the show has taken many things from her. That made judge Đỗ Mạnh Cường lose his temptation and rebutted her on his own Facebook page that she would be forbidden to appear in any shows of his or any shows that he has been related with.

- First call-out: Lê Thị Thúy
- Bottom three: Trần Thanh Thủy, Phan Ngọc Phương Nghi, & Nguyễn Thị Hoàng Oanh
- Eliminated: Phan Ngọc Phương Nghi & Nguyễn Thị Hoàng Oanh

=== Episode 9 ===
Air date: November 27, 2011

Judge Nam Trung came to the house to teach the girls the basic of the make-up process. The girls were then moved to another location where this week's challenge took place. They were divided into three groups which had three different themes:

Group	Theme
Lê Phương, Thùy Dương & Hoàng Thùy	Russian dolls
Nguyễn Tuyết, Thanh Thủy & Thùy Trang	Chinese dolls
Lê Thuý, Phương Anh & Trà My	African dolls

Each girl had different role in the group: a stylist, a make-up artist and a model. Later, judge Nam Trung announced the group with African dolls theme the challenge winner for being well cooperative.

This week's elimination photoshoot involved the girls portraying a very hot issue of the society right now, which is domestic violence. In the first set, the girls were proudly adored by their lovers; in the next set, they were shown being harshly abused by them. Unlike other 8 girls who have not had the experiences of marriage, Lê Phương easily outshines them. Hoàng Thùy, Phương Anh, and Thùy Dương struggled most. Phương Anh and Thùy Dương found themselves in the bottom two, Phương Anh because she was criticized for her over-concentration and Thùy Dương for her inability to transfer herself into her characters. In the end, it was Thùy Dương who was eliminated.

- First call-out: Lê Thị Phương
- Bottom two: Nguyễn Thị Phương Anh & Nguyễn Thùy Dương
- Eliminated: Nguyễn Thùy Dương
- Featured designer: Tylor Trần, Đỗ Mạnh Cường

=== Episode 10 ===
Air date: December 04, 2011

The girls were brought to a grand theater where they met a nationwide actor Thành Lộc who challenged them to act according to a given situation. While the other girls struggled with their performances due to lack of experience, Trà My, Phương Anh and Thùy Trang impressed Thành Lộc most. In the end, Trà My was chosen as the challenge winner. The reward for the challenge was a fine dinner with one famous celebrity in the showbiz (Ngô Thanh Vân, the dinner was not shown during the broadcast), and she chose Thùy Trang to join her in her reward.

Later, the girls met the presenters of XoneFM and they were tasked to be a host of the radio show. Lê Phương was disappointed at herself for over-acting. Phương Anh won the second challenge for her very professional performance.

For the elimination challenge, the girls were put to the test when they had to shoot a commercial for Samsung Galaxy Young. During the commercial, not many girls wowed the director beside Hoàng Thùy, Thùy Trang but they all still managed to finish their shoots. After wrapping the commercial up, judge Phạm Hoài Nam surprised the girls by naming the four girls who were chosen to walk in judge Đỗ Mạnh Cường's fashion show, including: Trà My, Phương Anh, Hoàng Thùy, and Nguyễn Tuyết.

At judging panel, the judges commented that Lê Phương's commercial was under average, and that she let herself into a character way too much. Thanh Thủy's commercial again disappointed the judges. Phương Anh, Lê Phương and Thanh Thủy landed in the bottom three due to next week unaired. Lê Phương and Thanh Thủy were eliminated for not being standing out like the others: Thanh Thủy for her inability to live up to her full modeling potential, and Lê Phương because the judges felt that even though she had a good personality, she tends not to make a progress.

It was also the first time in Vietnam's Next Top Model that all four judges burst into tears when they had to see the contestants leaving. This episode could be considered as the most emotional one in this cycle.

- First call-out: Hoàng Thị Thùy
- Bottom three: Lê Thị Phương, Trần Thanh Thủy & Nguyễn Thị Phương Anh
- Eliminated: Lê Thị Phương & Trần Thanh Thủy

=== Episode 11 ===
Air date: December 18, 2011

Arriving home after a busy working day, the remaining 6 girls were cheered up when they received LaLa's mail telling them to pack their belongings and be ready to head to Tây Nguyên where all of this week's episode's activities took place.

The girls were challenged with a fitness competition consisting of 3 tasks. The first task is the limbo which is designed to test their flexibility; the second one is the long-jump which is designed to test their agility and balance. The final task is the hurdle which is used to test their speed and agility too. Lê Thuý, with a background as a volleyball player, easily finished all three rounds in the fastest time; she was announced the winner of the first main challenge.

On the following day, the girls were taught how to walk on stilts by the natives here in Tây Nguyên. This exercise was told later that it will help the girls walk easily on any high heels. Since this was the first time doing it for all of the girls, they all struggled to balance and stand still. However, after practicing for a while, Phương Anh finally got it first which really upset Thùy Trang who was born and raised here. Phương Anh also won the title for the fastest stilts-walker.

This week's elimination photoshoot was to do a high-fashion pose with elephants. While Trà My surprisingly excelled the shoot with many creative poses, Nguyễn Tuyết and Phương Anh could not step out of their comfort zones. Phương Anh struggled finding her perfect spot while Nguyễn Tuyết could not overcome her fear.

At panel, Trà My was praised for her couture picture and her significant image-change from a teen girl to a very attractive woman; hence, she was the first call out of this week. Lê Thuý got the second best photo, but she was criticized by the head judge Xuân Lan for giving bad attitude during the shoot and other activities. Landing in the bottom two were Nguyễn Tuyết and Phương Anh, Nguyễn Tuyết because the judges felt that she started to lose her model look and also easily got distracted, and Phương Anh for the judges felt she got weaker week after week as this is her third consecutive time being in the bottom two. However, Phương Anh again got another chance which means Nguyễn Tuyết was eliminated.

- First call-out: Nguyễn Thị Trà My
- Bottom two: Nguyễn Thị Phương Anh & Nguyễn Thị Tuyết
- Eliminated: Nguyễn Thị Tuyết
- Featured designer: Đỗ Mạnh Cường

=== Episode 12 ===
Air date: December 25, 2011

While the girls were about to go to their go-sees, Tuyết Lan, the runner up of cycle 1 came by the house and surprised them. Besides being here to support the girls, Tuyết Lan also showed the girls how to stand out during the castings. Specifically, the most important thing a professional model always carries with her is her fashion portfolio where she has all of her best photos there.

The girls had to drive by themselves on a motorcycle to their castings, except for Hoàng Thùy who does not know to drive one. Phương Anh and Trà My who come from the northern area had difficulty finding their way around town. The casting places include DMC's which belongs to the head judge Đỗ Mạnh Cường, Valenciani's, and Kelly Bùi's fashion boutique located around Ho Chi Minh City. Most of the girls received positive comments except for Phương Anh who was not asked to try on outfits twice. On the next day, at different time, each girl received a call from Her World magazine asking her to do a photoshoot for the magazine.

For this week's elimination photoshoot, the girls had to showcase their poses on a high wire. While Thùy Trang, Trà My, and Lê Thúy rocked the set, Phương Anh and especially Hoàng Thùy had to fight their fear of heights.

At panel, most of the girls received praise from the judges. Lê Thúy and Trà My impressed the judges with their outstanding photos. On the other hand, Phương Anh was criticized again for being too stiff, and she even confessed that she felt fading away from the judges. In the end, Phương Anh and Thùy Trang landed in the bottom two, but it was Phương Anh who was eliminated in her fourth consecutive appearance in the bottom two since the judges felt Thùy Trang has made more progress.

- First call-out: Lê Thị Thúy
- Bottom two: Nguyễn Thị Phương Anh & Nguyễn Thị Thùy Trang
- Eliminated: Nguyễn Thị Phương Anh
- Featured designer: Đỗ Mạnh Cường

=== Episode 13 ===
Air date: January 01, 2012

BeU model management's director came by the house and surprised the top 4 by telling them that they were going to Singapore. Landing on Singapore, the girls were amazed by the country's beauty. Yet, they came here not for a vacation but to experience the international working- environment in one of the biggest fashion industries of Asia. Therefore, immediately, the four remaining girls were put in a casting of Black Market, a fashion franchise in Singapore. Lê Thúy, Thùy Trang, and Hoàng Thùy with their limited English struggled to understand and communicate with the foreign producers; however, they all managed to do well.

For the elimination photoshoot, the themes of this week were to be sexy and appealing as they will be shooting in 3 different locations. In the first photoshoot, the girls posed with the male model at the pool; the second photoshoot was to do a close-up at the bar, and the girls posed on a high bar desk while wearing long evening gowns in the last one.

And for the first time in VNTM, the top 4 was walking in the international fashion show where they were seen by hundreds of people. The girls then spend their last day with a trip to Universal Studios Singapore. After return to Ho Chi Minh City, they were surprised to see their loved ones at the model house and got spend a day with them.

At the last judging panel of this cycle, all of the girls received tremendous praises from the judges for being confident and professional. However, while Hoàng Thùy was still criticized for being a bit stiff, Thùy Trang struggled to beautify her eye and facial expression, and Lê Thúy was so fragile that she hardened herself. Consequently, Xuân Lan handed Lê Thúy and Hoàng Thùy the final two photos, meaning Thùy Trang was eliminated even though she won the reward for having the best catwalk during the fashion show. Also, the host mentioned all the photographs of final four will appear in Her World Vietnam's January 2012 issue editorials like prize for their such efforts during the whole journey.

After the elimination, the top 3 have been training and prepare for the finale, as they were flown to Bangkok to shoot for their Her World magazine cover.

- First call-out: Nguyễn Thị Trà My
- Bottom three: Hoàng Thị Thùy, Nguyễn Thị Thùy Trang & Lê Thị Thúy
- Eliminated: Nguyễn Thị Thùy Trang
- Featured designer: Đỗ Mạnh Cường, Kelly Bùi, Valenciani and Black Market

=== Episode 14 - Live Finale ===
Air date: January 08, 2012

- Final 3: Hoàng Thị Thùy, Trần Thị Trà My & Lê Thị Thúy
- Eliminated: Lê Thị Thúy
- Final 2:Nguyễn Thị Trà My & Hoàng Thị Thùy
- Vietnam's Next Top Model 2011: Hoàng Thị Thùy
- Featured designer: Đỗ Mạnh Cường
- Special guest judge: Tyra Banks

== Summaries ==
=== Call-out order ===
Order	Episodes												
Order	3	4	5	6	7	8	9	10	11	12	13	14	
1	Tuyết	Oanh	Anh	Thùy H.	Tuyết	Thúy L.	Phương	Thùy H.	My	Thúy L.	My	Thùy H.	Thùy H.
2	Nghi	Thùy H.	Trang	Oanh	Phương	Thùy H.	Trang	My	Thúy L.	My	Thúy L.	My	My
3	Anh	Thúy L.	Thùy H.	Tuyết	Anh	Phương	Thúy L.	Thúy L.	Thùy H.	Thùy H.	Thùy H.	Thúy L.	
4	Kikki	Kikki	Tuyền	Anh	Oanh	Anh	Thủy T.	Trang	Trang	Trang	Trang		
5	Oanh	Tuyết	Thủy T.	Thúy L.	Trang	Tuyết	My	Tuyết	Anh	Anh			
6	Dung	Nghi	Phương	Dương	Thủy T.	Dương	Thùy H.	Anh	Tuyết				
7	Thúy L.	My	Tuyết	Trang	My	Trang	Tuyết	Phương; Thủy T.					
8	Tuyền	Anh	Oanh	My	Dương	My	Anh	Phương; Thủy T.					
9	Linh	Dung	Dung	Nghi	Thùy H.	Thủy T.	Dương						
10	Dương	Tuyền	My	Phương	Nghi	Nghi; Oanh							
11	Phương	Trang	Nghi	Dung	Thúy L.	Nghi; Oanh							
12	Trang	Thủy T.	Thúy L.	Thủy T.	Dung								
13	Thủy T.	Dương	Dương	Tuyền									
14	Thùy H.	Phương	Kikki										
15	My	Linh											

The contestant was eliminated
The contestant won the competition

- In the first two episodes, young girls were scouted by the whole new jury, each of which regions comprises about 10.
- The following contestants were part of a double elimination:
  - In episode 8, Nghi and Oanh were eliminated simultaneously.
  - In episode 10, Phương and Thủy T. both were sent home.
- In the live finale, Thùy H. and My were called through to the final 2 in no particular order.

=== Average call-out order ===
Rank by average	Place	Model	Call-out total	Number of call-outs	Call-out average
1	1	Thùy H.	49	13	3.77
2	3	Thúy L.	66	12	4.42
3	6	Tuyết	40	9	4.44
4	5	Anh	47	10	4.70
5	10-11	Oanh	31	6	5.17
6	2	My	69	13	5.31
7	4	Trang	62	11	5.63
8	7-8	Phương	54	8	6.75
9	14	Kikki	22	3	7.33
10	10-11	Nghi	48	6	8.00
11	7-8	Thủy	69	8	8.63
12	13	Tuyền	35	4	8.75
13	9	Dương	65	7	9.29
14	12	Dung	47	5	9.40
15	15	Linh	24	2	12.00

=== Photo Shoot Guide ===
- Episode 4 Photo Shoot: Beauty Blooming (Beauty Shoot)
- Episode 5 Photo Shoot: Disco Paradise
- Episode 6 Photo Shoot: Reborn (Posing with Tarantulas)
- Episode 7 Photo Shoot: Posing Underwater
- Episode 8 Photo Shoot: Body Shot with Fabric
- Episode 9 Photo Shoot: Campaign Against Domestic Violence
- Episode 10 Commercial: Samsung Galaxy Young Commercial
- Episode 11 Photo Shoot: Posing with Elephants
- Episode 12 Photo Shoot: On High Wires
- Episode 13 Photo Shoot: A View to Kill (Her World editorials)
- Episode 14 Photo Shoot: Cover of Her World; Burlesque

== Judges ==
- Nguyễn Xuân Lan (Host) former nationwide model
- Đinh Nam Trung (creativity director) make-up artist and stylist
- Phạm Hoài Nam (photography director) fashion photographer
- Đỗ Mạnh Cường (fashion director) fashion designer

== Controversies ==
New set of judges which were introduced on the first day of audition brings much happiness and excitement to audience. Some critics, however, have complained that this panel, which boasts loads of fashion industry expertise in Vietnam, but has no international experience is in contrast with axed panels.

Put back the purpose of the competition, I personally appreciate last year qualification of the show and finalists over this year at the same time [of consideration]. This year girls remain [up to now] I find most of them all have troubles of measurement.

— Ms. Thúy Nga, the Director of Elite Vietnam

Ms. Thúy Nga from Elite Vietnam responded through an interview with VTC News about qualification of a Top Model. She stated mostly body shapes of finalists are rough, not proportioned and the face of no one has inspired her. She also emphasized 'being a Top Model for 3 months is unbelievable'. She thought the competition is possibly considered a game show of recreation, so in this point of view audience should be softer and get funnier when watching.

Beside, judges and finalists are harshly criticized. Public reports pointed out judges acted to cast member in a very unacceptable manner. If the judges worried about someone's potential or they don't feel quite comfortable with finalists' behaviours they are able to disqualify them rather than shout at and trash them. And to cast member, for example, Lê Thúy's crying prior to overcoming troubles, the request from Xuân Lan for contestant Lê Phương to praise her attractiveness over landscape, Khánh Linh's eligibility for VNTM only by jumping to swimming pool during cold weather or times of hardly reasonable circumstances turn viewers confused. The question was spontaneously created why contestants make themselves inferior and endure being blamed. BUT overall as can be shown the girls have extremely strong desire to have lifetime-changing chance regarding fame and they will do whatever to achieve it even they must pay for it.

Like other NTM franchises, the results of unaired episodes have been leaked out. Representative of producers, Ms. Quỳnh Trang expresses daring to file lawsuit against Hoàng Oanh, Phương Nghi and another contestant (pointedly Thùy Dương) for spoiling and leaking info before the date on which they were officially evicted. Furthermore, Ms. Quỳnh Trang warned the other contestants and revealed the producers and the legal team are in progress of watching out. In addition, three girls are axed from live final runway show.
