= Her World =

Magazine published in Singapore

Her World (magazine)
- Cover of Vietnamese edition
- Publisher: SPH Magazines
- Founded: 1960
- First issue: July 1960
- Company: SPH Media
- Country: Singapore
- Language: English, Vietnamese, Thai, Indonesian
- Website: herworld.com
- ISSN: 0046-7278

Her World is a monthly English-language women’s magazine published in Singapore. First launched in July 1960, it is Singapore’s first English-language women’s magazine. Targeted primarily at women, particularly working professionals, the magazine covers fashion, beauty, health, relationships, career, lifestyle and social issues affecting women. It also features interviews and profiles of notable women in Singapore and internationally.

== History ==
First published in July 1960, Her World was Singapore's first English-language women's magazine . The magazine subsequently expanded into regional markets, with editions published in Malaysia, Indonesia, Thailand and Vietnam. These editions featured locally adapted content, with the Indonesian, Thai and Vietnamese editions published in their respective national languages.

The Thai edition was discontinued in 2017.

The Malaysian edition, regarded as Malaysia's first locally produced women’s magazine, featured a distinct logo and covered fashion, beauty, lifestyle and topics relevant to working women. It ceased publication on 30 April 2020 following the closure of its publisher, Blu Inc Media. The company discontinued more than 20 magazine titles amid declining print revenues and financial pressures arising from the COVID-19 pandemic and Malaysian Movement Control Order.

The Singapore edition is published by SPH Media through its magazine publishing business.

== Her World Singapore: Milestones ==
• 1991: Her World establishes the Her World Woman of the Year award to recognise Singaporean women for their achievements and contributions to their respective fields and communities.

• 1999: The Her World Young Woman Achiever Award is introduced to recognise the achievements of women under 40.

• 2003: Her World is Singapore’s best-selling women’s magazine, with a print circulation of 141,000 copies.

• July 2010: To mark its 50th anniversary, Her World Singapore publishes a special collector's edition without a cover model, the first issue to do so since the magazine's launch in July 1960.

• October 2017: Her World Singapore undergoes a redesign, introducing new typography, an updated layout and the tagline "Useful, Inspiring, Empowering".

== Editors ==
Name	Role	Tenure	Publisher Era
Oswald Henry	Editor	1960–c. 1970s	Straits Times Press
Betty Khoo-Kingsley (Betty Lau-Khoo)	Editor-in-Chief	1976–1994	Singapore Press Holdings (SPH)
Tan Wang Joo	Editor-in-Chief	mid–to–late 1990s	SPH Magazines
Caroline Ngui	Editor-in-Chief	1998–2000	SPH Magazines
Elizabeth Gwee	Editor-in-Chief	late 1990s–early 2000s	SPH Magazines
Rachel Tan	Editor	2005–2007	SPH Magazines
Denyse Yeo	Editor	Oct 2009–July 2012	SPH Magazines
Genevieve Jiang	Editor	Jan 2013–Jun 2014	SPH Magazines
Pearlyn Tham	Editor	2014–2015	SPH Magazines
Penelope Chan	Executive Editor (interim editor)	Jan-Nov 2017	SPH Magazines
Reta Lee	Editor-in-Chief	Nov 2017–May 2018	SPH Magazines
Ng Yi Lian	Editor	2019–2021	SPH Magazines
Elizabeth R. Lee	Editor-in-Chief	Dec 2021–present	SPH Media Trust

== Link with modelling show series ==
The winner of Vietnam's Next Top Model from cycle 1 and 2 will have a spread and be on the cover of Her World Vietnam and will be supported by Her World International.

The winner of The Face Vietnam from cycle 3 onwards will have a spread and be on the cover of Her World Vietnam and will be supported by Her World International.
