= Miss Universe Vietnam 2019 =

4th Miss Universe Vietnam pageant

- Date: 7 December 2019
- Presenters: Trấn Thành; Hoàng Oanh
- Entertainment: Thu Minh; Trọng Hiếu
- Venue: Crown Convention Center, Nha Trang, Khánh Hòa, Vietnam
- Broadcaster: VTV1
- Entrants: 60
- Placements: 15
- Winner: Nguyễn Trần Khánh Vân; Thành phố Hồ Chí Minh
- Congeniality: Lương Ý Như, Hà Nội
- Best National Costume: Nguyễn Trần Khánh Vân, Thành phố Hồ Chí Minh

Miss Universe Vietnam 2019 was the fourth Miss Universe Vietnam pageant, held at the Crown Convention Center in Nha Trang, Khánh Hòa, Vietnam, on 7 December 2019.

H'Hen Niê crowned Nguyễn Trần Khánh Vân as her successor at the end of the event. Nguyễn Trần Khánh Vân represented Vietnam in the Miss Universe 2020 competition in Hollywood, Florida, where Khánh Vân finished in the top 21.

On 20 November 2021, Nguyễn Huỳnh Kim Duyên was appointed as Miss Universe Vietnam 2021 and represented the country at the Miss Universe 2021 competition, finishing in the top 16.

== Results ==
=== Placements ===
Placement	Contestant
Miss Universe Vietnam 2019	Nguyễn Trần Khánh Vân
1st Runner-Up	Nguyễn Huỳnh Kim Duyên
2nd Runner-Up	Phạm Hồng Thúy Vân
Top 5	Nguyễn Thị Hương Ly; Đào Thị Hà
Top 10	Phạm Thị Anh Thư; Lê Hoàng Phương; Vũ Quỳnh Trang; Lê Thu Trang; Lương Ý Như
Top 15	Kiều Thị Thúy Hằng; Vũ Thị Hòa Liên; Nguyễn Đặng Tường Linh; Lâm Thị Bích Tuyền; Nguyễn Diana †

=== Special awards ===
Award	Contestant
Best Smile	Nguyễn Đặng Tường Linh
Best Social Media	Phạm Hồng Thúy Vân
Best Catwalk	Nguyễn Trần Khánh Vân
Best Interview	Phạm Hồng Thúy Vân
Best English Skill	Phạm Hồng Thúy Vân
Miss BVote Universe	Trần Tâm Thanh
People's Choice	Vũ Thị Hòa Liên
Miss Congeniality	Lương Ý Như
Miss Talent	Nguyễn Ngô Hoàng Nhi
Miss Ao Dai	Nguyễn Trần Khánh Vân
Miss Beach	Lê Hoàng Phương
Miss Sport	Nguyễn Diana
Miss Media	Phạm Hồng Thúy Vân
Miss Bravery	Vũ Quỳnh Trang
Miss Fashion	Nguyễn Thị Hương Ly

== Format ==
As with Miss Universe Vietnam 2017, the competition was accompanied by a reality TV series called I Am Miss Universe Vietnam in which the top 60 contestants were put through challenges and training programs in each episode. This year, 15 contestants were eliminated before the preliminary round.

The top 45 contestants participated in the preliminary competition on 3 December 2017 in áo dài, swimsuit and evening gown contests. At the finale on 7 December, the contestants were trimmed down to 15, and proceeded to compete in an opening statement and swimsuit contest. After that, the top 10 contestants advanced to the evening gown competition. Five contestants then had an interview round that determined the top three contestants were. The top 3 then participated in another question and answer round to find the winner.

=== Judging panel ===
The judging panel for the competition included:

- Võ Thị Xuân Trang – John Robert Powers School principal
- Lê Diệp Linh – ergonomist
- Nguyễn Công Trí – fashion designer
- Phạm Thị Thanh Hằng, Miss Model Photogenic Vietnam 2002 – fashion model, actress, beauty pageant titleholder, Miss Intercontinental Vietnam 2005
- Trần Thị Hương Giang, Miss Hải Dương 2006, Miss World Vietnam 2009 – beauty pageant titleholder
- Vũ Thu Phương – businesswoman, fashion model
- Samuel Hoàng – photographer

== Contestants ==
=== Top 45 final round ===
Name	Age 12	No.14	Height 1.87	Hometown bac lieu	Placements	Notes
Phạm Thị Thu Hà	22	104	1.74 m	Ho Chi Minh City		
Trần Thị Dung	19	107	1.74 m	Bắc Ninh		
Kiều Thị Thúy Hằng	19	111	1.75 m	Hà Nội	Top 15	
Nguyễn Thị Quỳnh Nga	21	115	1.68 m	Hải Dương		
H'Lida Niê Cao	19	118	1.71 m	Đắk Lắk		
Lương Ý Như	23	134	1.73 m	Hà Nội	Top 10	
Hoàng Thị Hương	20	142	1.68 m	Thanh Hóa		
Phạm Thị Anh Thư	22	144	1.74 m	Hà Nam	Top 10	
Lê Thu Trang	22	145	1.74 m	Hà Nội	Top 10	
Lê Phương Thảo	25	403	1.69 m	Thái Bình		
Nguyễn Ngọc Thanh Ngân	19	147	1.70 m	Ho Chi Minh City		
Nguyễn Lan Anh	21	148	1.72 m	Bắc Ninh		
Nguyễn Diana †	23	150	1.66 m	Hà Nội	Top 15	
Nguyễn Trần Khánh Vân	24	202	1.75 m	TP.HCM	Miss Universe Vietnam 2019	
Nguyễn Huỳnh Kim Duyên	24	203	1.73 m	Cần Thơ	1st Runner Up	
Phạm Ngọc Bảo Ngân	20	204	1.67 m	Ho Chi Minh City		
Nguyễn Thị Vân Anh	24	205	1.72 m	Hưng Yên		
Trương Quỳnh Ngọc	20	207	1.66 m	TP.HCM		
Lê Ngọc Tuyền	21	209	1.72 m	Cà Mau		
Trần Thị Kim Vàng	24	213	1.67 m	Long An	Withdraw	
Huỳnh Minh Thiên Hương	23	216	1.68 m			
Phạm Hồng Thúy Vân	26	218	1.72 m	Ho Chi Minh City	2nd Runner Up	
Lê Thị Mỹ Trinh	25	228	1.67 m	Khánh Hòa		
Nguyễn Ngô Hoàng Nhi	21	229	1.66 m	Khánh Hòa		
Lê Hoàng Phương	24	231	1.75 m	Khánh Hòa	Top 10	
Hoàng Kim Ngân	18	233	1.68 m	Gia Lai		
Trần Thị My	22	236	1.70 m	Bạc Liêu		
Lâm Thị Bích Tuyền	20	241	1.67 m	An Giang	Top 15	
Nguyễn Thị Hương Ly	24	242	1.75 m	Gia Lai	Top 5	
Đặng Thị Mỹ Khôi	22	245	1.66 m	Long An		
Trần Thị Ngọc Trúc	23	247	1.72 m	Tiền Giang		
Vũ Thị Hòa Liên	24	250	1.68 m	Thái Bình	Top 15	
Nguyễn Thị Anh	26	317	1.83 m	Hà Nội		
H'Luăi Hwing	18	319	1.71 m	Đắk Lắk		
Trần Tâm Thanh	20	320	1.65 m	Yên Bái		
Đặng Nhật Minh	18	329	1.71 m	Phú Thọ		
Vũ Quỳnh Trang	22	330	1.69 m	Nam Định	Top 10	
Nguyễn Đặng Tường Linh	25	331	1.67 m	Phú Yên	Top 15	
Đào Thị Hà	22	334	1.74 m	Nghệ An	Top 5	
Hoàng Thị Hải Yến	25	335	1.72 m	Bắc Giang		
Vũ Thị Lan Anh	21	338	1.68 m	Ninh Bình		
Vũ Thục Chinh	23	342	1.73 m	Quảng Ninh		
Chu Thị Minh Trang	29	345	1.70 m	Hải Phòng		

=== Top 60 preliminary ===
Name	Year of Birth	No.	Height	Hometown	Notes
Ngô Thị Thu Hương	1998	119	1.71 m	Bình Dương	
Đỗ Thị Thu Huyền	1994	125	1.66 m	Hưng Yên	
Quách Thị Tin	1998	126	1.65 m	Hòa Bình	
Mai Thảo Nguyên	1996	135	1.66 m	Quảng Nam	
Phan Thị Thảo Vân	1997	140	1.75 m	Đắk Lắk	
Đặng Trương Thủy Tiên	1994	222	1.66 m	Đồng Tháp	
Hoàng Minh Trang	1993	232	1.66 m	Gia Lai	
Lê Thu Hòa	1998	315	1.70 m	Ninh Bình	
Nguyễn Diệu Hiền	1999	316	1.77 m	Hải Phòng	
Phạm Phương Thảo	1994	322	1.72 m	Thái Nguyên	
Âu Hải Yến	1997	325	1.67 m	Nghệ An	
Đào Nhật Linh	1996	326	1.67 m	Lào Cai	
Nguyễn Thị Hồng Vân	1996	337	1.80 m	Hà Nội	
Cao Diệp Anh	1995	344	1.65 m	Tuyên Quang	Withdraw
Phạm Thị Minh Phương	2000	349	1.73 m	Thái Nguyên	

== I Am Miss Universe Vietnam ==
=== Contestants ===
After a nationwide audition process, top 60 contestants were selected to continue to compete for the title. The following list includes each contestant's ranking after each episode of the series, based on the score of their performance.

N.0	Contestant	Province/ Municipality	Ep.2	Ep.3	Ep.4	Ep.5	Ep.6	Cum. (Note: Cumulative ranking after Episode 6.)
104	Phạm Thị Thu Hà	Ho Chi Minh City	39	37	57	30	24	51
107	Trần Thị Dung	Bắc Ninh	56	37	57	46	24	54
111	Kiều Thị Thúy Hằng	Hanoi	14	5	49	40	24	24
115	Nguyễn Thị Quỳnh Nga	Hải Dương	58	21	35	39	24	39
118	H'Lida Niê Cao	Đắk Lắk	40	57	56	34	24	55
119	Ngô Thị Thu Hương	Bình Dương	56	37	29	6	24	43
125	Đỗ Thị Thu Huyền	Hưng Yên	40	12	49	52	24	42
126	Quách Thị Tin	Hòa Bình	59	57	29	8	24	45
134	Lương Ý Như	Hanoi	19	22	49	19	23	18
135	Mai Thảo Nguyên	Quảng Nam	44	48	35	14	24	48
140	Phan Thị Thảo Vân	Đắk Lắk	31	48	49	52	24	57
142	Hoàng Thị Hương	Thanh Hóa	35	24	35	5	24	31
144	Phạm Thị Anh Thư	Hà Nam	5	45	10	49	10	15
145	Lê Thu Trang	Hanoi	7	8	22	11	4	8
147	Nguyễn Ngọc Thanh Ngân	Ho Chi Minh City	9	48	35	57	24	36
148	Nguyễn Lan Anh	Bắc Ninh	23	20	35	25	24	34
150	Nguyễn Diana	Hanoi	3	42	3	1	14	6
202	Nguyễn Trần Khánh Vân	Ho Chi Minh City	11	9	4	12	17	4
203	Nguyễn Huỳnh Kim Duyên	Cần Thơ	10	3	5	48	3	2
204	Phạm Ngọc Bảo Ngân	Ho Chi Minh City	35	36	26	45	24	40
205	Nguyễn Thị Vân Anh	Hưng Yên	17	15	26	43	24	25
207	Trương Quỳnh Ngọc	Ho Chi Minh City	15	10	57	2	15	11
209	Lê Ngọc Tuyền	Cà Mau	18	28	26	52	24	29
213	Trần Thị Kim Vàng	Long An	24	45	13	31	7	19
216	Huỳnh Minh Thiên Hương	Quảng Ngãi	27	32	34	47	4	23
217	Nguyễn Thị Thu Cúc	Trà Vinh	26	11	35	26	24	33
218	Phạm Hồng Thúy Vân	Ho Chi Minh City	13	13	2	32	1	1
222	Đặng Trương Thủy Tiên	Đồng Tháp	37	54	8	4	24	26
228	Lê Thị Mỹ Trinh	Khánh Hòa	21	48	25	34	24	46
229	Nguyễn Ngô Hoàng Nhi	Khánh Hòa	2	37	35	13	24	30
231	Lê Hoàng Phương	Khánh Hòa	12	7	6	9	15	3
232	Hoàng Minh Trang	Gia Lai	46	60	29	23	24	52
233	Hoàng Kim Ngân	Gia Lai	22	54	29	34	24	47
236	Trần Thị My	Bạc Liêu	30	27	35	55	24	44
241	Lâm Thị Bích Tuyền	An Giang	20	26	57	40	24	27
242	Nguyễn Thị Hương Ly	Gia Lai	4	30	9	17	8	5
245	Đặng Thị Mỹ Khôi	Long An	8	2	18	19	18	10
247	Trần Thị Ngọc Trúc	Tiền Giang	49	53	35	19	24	49
249	Đỗ Thị Minh Tâm	Hanoi	24	25	16	17	21	17
250	Vũ Thị Hòa Liên	Thái Bình	50	16	19	19	9	21
315	Lê Thu Hòa	Ninh Bình	52	29	35	14	24	37
316	Nguyễn Diệu Hiền	Haiphong	50	45	23	34	24	50
317	Nguyễn Thị Anh	Hanoi	16	35	12	44	13	9
319	H'Luăi Hwing	Đắk Lắk	46	34	23	6	24	32
320	Trần Tâm Thanh	Yên Bái	46	37	35	49	24	56
322	Phạm Phương Thảo	Thái Nguyên	52	54	48	58	59	60
325	Âu Hải Yến	Nghệ An	43	31	35	33	24	41
326	Đào Nhật Linh	Lào Cai	52	42	15	34	24	35
329	Đặng Nhật Minh	Phú Thọ	52	4	11	40	20	16
330	Vũ Quỳnh Trang	Nam Định	27	14	1	29	11	12
331	Nguyễn Đặng Tường Linh	Phú Yên	6	17	19	16	19	13
334	Đào Thị Hà	Nghệ An	1	1	18	49	2	7
335	Hoàng Thị Hải Yến	Bắc Giang	40	19	19	56	24	38
337	Nguyễn Thị Hồng Vân	Hanoi	59	57	49	26	24	53
338	Vũ Thị Lan Anh	Ninh Bình	44	48	48	24	4	28
342	Vũ Thục Chinh	Quảng Ninh	32	6	49	28	22	22
344	Cao Thị Diệp Anh	Tuyên Quang	32	18	29	58	59	59
345	Chu Thị Minh Trang	Haiphong	27	23	14	3	24	20
349	Phạm Thị Minh Phương	Thái Nguyên	37	42	49	58	24	58
403	Lê Phương Thảo	Thái Bình	34	33	7	10	11	14

=== Episodes ===
No. overall	No. in season	Title	Original release date
13	1	"I Am Brave" (Vietnamese: Tôi dũng cảm)	4 October 2019
The search for Miss Universe Vietnam 2019 began. From hundreds of applicants, top 60 contestants were selected by the judge after several rounds of catwalk and interview.
14	2	"I Am Graceful" (Vietnamese: Tôi thần thái)	11 October 2019
Top 60 contestants gathered in Ho Chi Minh City and took part in a catwalk training session with Vietnamese supermodels Võ Hoàng Yến and Vũ Thu Phương. They then took part in a catwalk challenge that required them to express a style of outfit (evening gown, swimsuit, áo dài or cocktail dress) and pose on a turning table at the end of the runway. Top 20 best performing contestants moved on to the next challenge of posing in front of a high speed camera in pairs.: Challenge winner: Đào Thị Hà; Episode winner: Đào Thị Hà
15	3	"I Am Stylish" (Vietnamese: Tôi phong cách)	18 October 2019
The contestants go through training sessions in skincare. They then took part in a group fashion styling challenge as they worked together to style each other in an assigned theme and put on a fashion show at the end of the challenge.: Challenge winner: Team Sporty (Nguyễn Trần Khánh Vân, Nguyễn Thị Thu Cúc, Vũ Thục Chinh, Đào Thị Hà, Đặng Nhật Minh, Đỗ Thị Thu Huyền, Kiều Thị Thúy Hằng, Trương Quỳnh Ngọc, Lê Hoàng Phương, Lê Thu Trang, Đặng Thị Mỹ Khôi); Episode winner: Đào Thị Hà
16	4	"I Am Elegant – I Am Integrative" (Vietnamese: Tôi thanh lịch – tôi hội nhập)	25 October 2019
The contestants attend a workshop in self-presentation, Western table manners and dining etiquette with lead judge Xuân Trang. Subsequent challenges present a scenario for contestants to react and practice the skills they had learned in the workshop.: Challenge winner: Nguyễn Diana; Episode winner: Vũ Thu Trang
17	5	"I Am Woman for Woman" (Vietnamese: Tôi vì cộng đồng – Woman for Woman)	1 November 2019
Top 6 from the last episode became team leaders in this episode. They selected their team members from the rest of the contestants before picking the type of charity organization their team would have to plan for. Each team visited different charity organizations to prepare for their business plan. Afterward, they had to pitch their idea to a panel consisting of Nam Á Bank Vice Director Vũ Thị Tuyết Nga, JCI Vietnam President Ngọc Diễm, Operation Smile Vietnam Ambassador Hương Giang, and Women Empowerment Organization Founder Hoàng Thùy.: Challenge winner: Nguyễn Diana's team (Nguyễn Diana, Trương Quỳnh Ngọc, Đặng Trương Thủy Tiên, Chu Thị Minh Trang, H'Luăi Hwing, Hoàng Thị Hương, Cao Thị Diệp Anh, Quách Thị Tin, Ngô Thị Thu Hương); Episode winner: Nguyễn Diana
18	6	"Tourism Ambassador 4.0" (Vietnamese: Đại sứ du lịch 4.0)	8 November 2019
With the special appearance of three Vietnamese YouTube vloggers: Dinology, Cô Em Trendy, and Giang Ơi, the contestants utilized their improvisation skill to introduce a given Vietnamese product as their audition to appear in a selected vlogger's video. Each vlogger picked a team of 7 or 8 contestants to create a blog video in the direction they are known for. Dinology's team, branded as #VietNomNom focused on Vietnamese cuisine, Cô Em Trendy's team, branded as #VietnamOnTrend, leaned towards beauty and fashion, and Giang Ơi's team, branded as #VietnamLifeAndStyle, used everyday lifestyle as their focus.: Challenge winner: Giang Ơi #VietnamLifeAndStyle Team (Phạm Hồng Thúy Vân, Vũ Thị Lan Anh, Nguyễn Huỳnh Kim Duyên, Đào Thị Hà, Huỳnh Minh Thiên Hương, Lê Thu Trang, Trần Thị Kim Vàng); Episode winner: Phạm Hồng Thúy Vân
