= Thúy Vân =

Vietnamese beauty pageant winner (born 1993)

Phạm Hồng Thúy Vân
- Born: Phạm Hồng Thúy Vân; 6 October 1993 (age 33); Hồ Chí Minh City, Vietnam
- Education: Royal Melbourne Institute of Technology
- Beauty pageant titleholder
- Title: Miss International Vietnam 2015; 3rd Runner-up Miss International 2015
- Major competitions: Miss Teen Vietnam 2012 (Unplaced); Miss Aodai Vietnam 2014 (1st Runner-up); Miss International 2015 (3rd Runner-up); Miss Universe Vietnam 2019 (2nd Runner-up)

Phạm Hồng Thúy Vân (born 6 October 1993) is a Vietnamese beauty pageant titleholder, model, singer and Businessperson. She is the first Vietnamese representative to win the 3rd Runner-up title at Miss International 2015. She also won the title 1st Runner-up at Miss Aodai Vietnam 2014 and 2nd Runner-up at Miss Universe Vietnam 2019. She was also the MC of Asia's Got Talent 2015 and also played the role of host of Shark Tank Vietnam and The X Factor Vietnam.

== Career ==
She was born on October 6, 1993 in Ho Chi Minh City. She studied and graduated from the Vocal Department of Ho Chi Minh City College of Culture and Arts in 2015. In 2018, she continued her studies and has later graduated from the Professional Communication major at RMIT University Vietnam.

=== Miss Aodai Vietnam 2014 ===
In 2014, she participated in the Miss Ao Dai Vietnam 2014. At the contest, her body measurements were 84-60-90, height 1m72, weight 50 kg. In the final night, she won the title of 1st Runner-up alongside the winner is Trần Ngọc Lan Khuê and 2nd Runner-up Nguyễn Thị Lệ Quyên. In addition, she also won the secondary award for the contestant with the most improved body shape in the contest. With the title of 1st Runner-up, she won the right to represent Vietnam at the Miss International 2015.

=== Miss International 2015 ===
She was appointed as Miss International Vietnam 2015 and participated in Miss International 2015. At the final, she won the title of 3rd runner-up and was the first Vietnamese person to win the title of runner-up in this contest.

=== Miss Universe Vietnam 2019 ===
In 2019, she participated in the Miss Universe Vietnam 2019 and won the 2nd runner-up. During the contest, she had excellent performances and won the challenges: "4.0 Tourism Ambassador", "I shine", "I am healthy, beautiful and charming". She also received a series of secondary awards: Best Social Media, Best Interview, Best English Skill and Miss Social Media.

=== Business career ===
On July 10, 2019, she established Cesium Entertainment Art Company Limited with the goal of creating digital content and talent management. Cesium Entertainment mainly focuses on producing talk shows, game shows, music videos, TVCs (TV commercials). A series of quality programs and products "Made by Van" have been well received by audiences such as: Con chat with Thuy Van, music video "Con se khong ve", video series "Dam cuoi Nhat Van", vlog, video series "Hanh chuyen an weaning", music video "My Vietnam" Vietnamese version,... As of 2021, Cesium Entertainment has a total of 13 social channels built and developed. At the same time, it has participated in many projects of major brands as well as leading prestigious media partners in Vietnam.

== Discography ==
Title	Year	Note
"My Vietnam"	2015	
"Con sẽ không về"	2021	
"Trái tim yêu thương"	2022	

== TV show ==
Year	TV Show	Role	Note
2015	Asia's Got Talent	MC	
2015	Cười xuyên Việt	Judge	Guest
2016	Người hát tình ca	Judge	Guest
2016	Nhân tố bí ẩn	MC	
2016	Đón Tết cùng VTV	MC	
2016	Vietnam's Next Top Model	Judge	Episode 6
2016	Lễ hội Áo dài 2016	MC	
2016	Biệt đội phong cách	Judge	
2016	How Do I Look? Asia	Mentor	
2017	Kiến tạo nhịp cầu	MC	
2017	Ai sẽ thành sao	DMC	
2017–2019	Shark Tank Vietnam	MC	
2018	Miss International Queen Vietnam 2018	Judge	
2018	Đấu trường võ nhạc	MC	
2018	Khúc hát se duyên	MC	
2016–2020	Giải Mai Vàng	MC	
2020	Vũ khúc ánh sáng	MC	

== Awards and nominations ==
Award	Year	Category	Result
Elle Beauty Awards	2019	Best Body of The Year	Nominated
Elle Style Awards	2016	Face of the Year	Nominated
Her World Young Achiever	2018	Presenter of the Year	Won
Missosology's Choice Award	2015	—N/a	Won

Awards and achievements
Preceded by (United Kingdom) Victoria Tooby	3rd Runner-up - Miss International; 2015	Succeeded by (Nicaragua) Brianny Chamorro
Preceded by Đặng Thu Thảo	Miss International Vietnam; 2015	Succeeded by Phạm Ngọc Phương Linh
Preceded by None	1st Runner-up - Miss Aodai Vietnam; 2014	Succeeded by Huỳnh Thị Yến Nhi
Preceded by Mâu Thị Thanh Thủy	2nd Runner-up - Miss Universe Vietnam; 2019	Succeeded by Huỳnh Phạm Thủy Tiên
