= Nguyễn Trần Khánh Vân =

Vietnamese beauty pageant titleholder

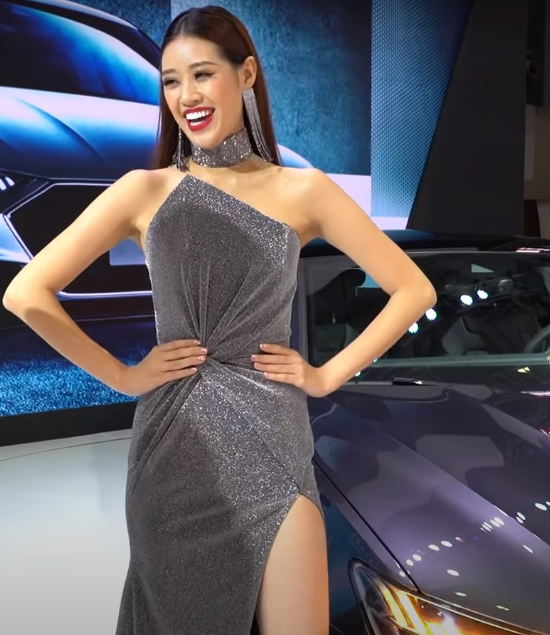
- Khánh Vân in 2019
- Born: Nguyễn Trần Khánh Vân; February 25, 1995 (age 31); Ho Chi Minh City, Vietnam
- Height: 1.75 m (5 ft 9 in)
- Beauty pageant titleholder
- Title: Miss Teen Áo Dài Vietnam 2013; Miss Universe Vietnam 2019
- Hair color: Brown
- Eye color: Brown
- Major competitions: Miss Teen Áo Dài Vietnam 2013; (Winner); Miss Star 2014; (2nd Runner-Up); Miss Vietnam 2014; (Unplaced); Miss Universe Vietnam 2015; (Top 10); Miss Universe Vietnam 2019; (Winner); Miss Universe 2020; (Top 21); (Fan Vote Winner)

Nguyễn Trần Khánh Vân (born February 25, 1995) is a Vietnamese beauty pageant titleholder who was crowned Miss Universe Vietnam 2019. She represented Vietnam at Miss Universe 2020 pageant and finished as a Top 21 semi-finalist.

== Early life and education ==
Khánh Vân was born in Ho Chi Minh City (Saigon). She attended the Ho Chi Minh City University of Theater Stage and Cinema.

== Pageantry ==
Khánh Vân began her pageantry career in 2013, when she won Miss Teen Áo dài Vietnam 2013, a Vietnamese beauty pageant where young women competed in the traditional áo dài national garment. At Miss Star 2014 she was second runner-up. Khánh Vân also participated in Miss Vietnam 2014 (top 40), and Miss Universe Vietnam 2015 (top 10).

Khánh Vân competed in Vietnam Supermodel 2018, and was one of the runners-up. She was mentored by Vietnamese singer and presenter Hương Giang. Khánh Vân entered and won Miss Universe Vietnam 2019. She was crowned by the previous titleholder H'Hen Niê. For this, she would represented Vietnam at Miss Universe 2020.

== Miss Universe 2020 ==
The 69th Miss Universe competition was supposed to be held in 2020, but delayed to May 2021 due to the disruption of the COVID-19 pandemic. As the winner of Miss Universe Vietnam 2019, Khánh Vân joined Miss Universe 2020 at Seminole Hard Rock Hotel & Casino in Hollywood, Florida with other 73 women from around the world.

According to Miss Universe official website, Khánh Vân's biography is described as:

Khanh Van Nguyen Tran is currently the ambassador of One Body Village - an organization that supports, rescues and helps girls who are exploited, sexually abused or in danger.

Khanh Van was almost a victim of sexual abuse and wants to use her voice to fight and protect children and women who are potential victims. She has also participated in several rescuing tours across Vietnam and attended trials and seminars with students to improve their knowledge of self-protection.

She’s also learning physical self-defence and helps parents understand how to protect and take care of their children. Khanh Van was born into a family that values love and believes that love is the power to help people overcome all the pain in life and live with more hope.

— Miss Universe Official Website

During the national costume competition on May 14, 2021, she impressed the audiences by wearing "Kén Em", a Cocoon costume inspired by the image of the silkworm cocoon used in silk weaving. "Kén Em" was 100 percent made using a meticulous hand-knitting technique, which also symbolizes the virtuous and patient spirit of the Vietnamese people. It was one of the six favorite national costumes chosen by Catriona Gray, the former Miss Universe 2018.

After the preliminary competition and a closed-door interview, she managed to enter top 21 semifinalist and received the highest number of fan votes in the history of Miss Universe.

Awards and achievements
Preceded by H'Hen Niê	Miss Cosmo Vietnam; 2019	Succeeded by Nguyễn Thị Ngọc Châu
Preceded by Hoàng Thị Thùy	Miss Universe Vietnam; 2019	Succeeded by Nguyễn Huỳnh Kim Duyên
Preceded by (Thailand) Chalita Suansane	Fan Vote Winner; Miss Universe; 2020	Succeeded by (Vietnam) Nguyễn Huỳnh Kim Duyên
