= Hoàng Thùy =

Vietnamese model and beauty pageant titleholder

- Born: Hoàng Thị Thùy; 15 March 1992 (age 34); Nghi Sơn, Thanh Hóa, Vietnam
- Other names: Maika Hoang; Mia Hoang; Hoàng Thùy
- Education: Hanoi Architectural University; Central Saint Martins
- Occupation: Model
- Years active: 2011–
- Title: Miss Universe Vietnam 2019
- Modeling information
- Hair color: Black
- Eye color: Brown
- Agency: BeU Models (Vietnam); PRM Models (London)

Hoàng Thị Thùy or Hoàng Thùy (pronounced [hʷaːŋ tʰʷi] hwang-twee; born 15 March 1992) is a Vietnamese model and beauty pageant titleholder. She began her career in 2011, after winning Vietnam's Next Top Model season 2. She was appointed Miss Universe Vietnam 2019 to represented Vietnam at Miss Universe 2019, and reached the top 20.

== Background and education ==
Thùy was born and raised in the commune of Thiền Lâm, Tĩnh Gia District, Thanh Hóa Province, Vietnam. When she was younger, she used to sell rice cakes on coach buses to assist her family. Despite financial struggles, her family continued to support her education. Thùy graduated from Tĩnh Gia 1 High School in 2010. She majored in industrial design at Hanoi Architectural University before participating in the second season of Vietnam's Next Top Model and pursued modelling afterwards. In 2016, she studied fashion design at Central Saint Martins in London.

== Career ==
=== Vietnam's Next Top Model ===
In 2011, Thùy auditioned for Vietnam's Next Top Model season 2 at the casting in the capital Hanoi and made it to the top fifteen, being the fourteen finalist selected. During the competition, Thùy was called first at panel two times and landed in the bottom two one time. She competed in the finale against Nguyễn Thị Trà My & Lê Thị Thúy and won the title.

=== Post show career ===
She joined Top Model of the World 2012 in Berlin, Germany where she reached the top 15, and won the Best Catwalk Award. In February 2014, she went to London fashion week's casting calls without an agency. With no personal contacts, she sent her portfolio by email to all the designers participating in Autumn/Winter 2014 London Fashion Week via any channels she could find. She first heard back from Jean Pierre Braganza and proceeded to successfully book 4 shows that season, which was a turning point in her international career. Since then, she has walked the runways of New York Fashion Week, London Fashion Week and Vietnam International Fashion Week. Thùy was named in Forbes Vietnam's 30 Under 30 list in 2015. She signed with PRM Models in London in 2015 and landed a fashion spread on Elle and Grazia after, becoming the first Vietnamese model to do so.

In 2017, she became a coach for season 2 of The Face Vietnam. Throughout the show, general viewers called Thùy "the master of proverbs" due to her tendency to use Vietnamese proverbs in her confessions.

=== Miss Universe Vietnam 2017 ===
Thùy entered Miss Universe Vietnam 2017, and was first runner-up. She won the People's Choice Award. The top three of the competition were all Vietnam's Next Top Model participants. Due to the biennial hosting of Miss Universe Vietnam, the next edition was held in 2019. Thus, Thùy has a chance to represent Vietnam at Miss Universe 2019 if the pageant is held sooner than the country's selection that year.

=== Miss Universe 2019 ===
On 6 May 2019, Thùy was officially appointed to be Vietnam's representative at Miss Universe 2019 after she placed 1st runner up in Miss Universe Vietnam 2017. Thùy competed in Miss Universe 2019 and placed in the Top 20 as she was one of the five most outstanding candidates from Africa and Asia Pacific.

== Titles, Awards and Nominations ==
=== Competitions and Pageants ===
Year	Competition/Pageant	Placement	Note
2011	Vietnam's Next Top Model	Won	She was chosen by Tyra Banks to be the winner.
2012	Top Model of the World	Top 15	She won the Best Catwalk Award of the competition.
2018	Miss Universe Vietnam 2017	1st Runner-up	She was awarded Best Catwalk, Futurista Online, People's Choice.
2019	Miss Universe 2019	Top 20	

=== Awards and nominations ===
Year	Association	Award	Result
2012	Star of the Year	Best Model of the Year	Nominated
2012	F Magazine Awards	Best Model of the Year	Won
2015	Forbes Vietnam	30 under 30 – Thirty best younger-than-30-year-old characters of the Year	Won
2015	HTV Awards	Best Model of the Year	Nominated
2016	Elle Style Awards	Fashion Icon of the Year	Nominated
2017	Wechoice Awards	Inspirational Character	Nominated
2019	Wechoice Awards	Inspirational Character	Nominated
2019	Star of the Year	Extraordinary Costume	Won
2020	Elle Beauty Awards	Best Body Award	Won

Awards and achievements
Preceded by Khiếu Thị Huyền Trang	Vietnam's Next Top Model; 2011	Succeeded by Mai Thị Giang
Preceded by Ngô Trà My	Miss Cosmo Vietnam; 1st Runner-Up; 2017	Succeeded by Nguyễn Huỳnh Kim Duyên
Preceded by H'Hen Niê	Miss Universe Vietnam; 2019	Succeeded by Nguyễn Trần Khánh Vân
