= Kim Duyên =

Vietnamese beauty pageant titleholder

Nguyễn Huỳnh Kim Duyên
- Born: Nguyễn Huỳnh Kim Duyên; October 19, 1995 (age 31); Cần Thơ, Vietnam
- Beauty pageant titleholder
- Title: Miss Universe Vietnam 2021; Miss Supranational Vietnam 2022
- Major competitions: Miss Ao Dai Vietnam 2014; (Top 12); Miss Vietnam 2016; (Top 36); Miss Universe Vietnam 2019; (1st Runner-Up); Miss Universe 2021; (Top 16); Miss Supranational 2022; (2nd Runner-Up)

Nguyễn Huỳnh Kim Duyên (born October 19, 1995) is a Vietnamese beauty pageant titleholder. She was the first runner-up at Miss Universe Vietnam 2019 and was later appointed Miss Universe Vietnam 2021 to compete at Miss Universe 2021 in Israel, where she reached the top 16. On February 22, 2022, she was appointed to represent Vietnam at Miss Supranational 2022, where she was the second runner-up, the highest achievement for Vietnam at Miss Supranational, breaking the record of Daniela Nguyễn Thu Mây at Miss Supranational 2011, who was third runner-up.

== Background ==
Duyên was born and raised in Can Tho in an agricultural family. She dropped out of university.

== Pageantry ==
Duyên's first beauty pageant was Miss Aodai Vietnam (or Miss World Vietnam 2014]) where she reached the top 12. In 2016, she won Miss Elegance Student at Southern Can Tho University and reached the top 36 at Miss Vietnam 2016. In 2019 she was the first runner-up at Miss Universe Vietnam 2019 at the Crown Convention Center in Nha Trang, Vietnam. By reaching the top two with Nguyễn Trần Khánh Vân, who represented Vietnam at Miss Universe 2020, Duyên became Miss Universe Vietnam 2021 and represented Vietnam at Miss Universe 2021 in Eilat, Israel. After returning from Miss Universe 2021 as one of 16 semifinalists, Duyên was appointed to become Miss Supranational Vietnam 2022 on February 22, 2022.

=== Miss Universe 2021 ===
The 70th Miss Universe competition was held in Eilat, Israel on December 13, 2021, where she reached the top 16, and also won the viewers vote.

=== Miss Supranational 2022 ===
Duyên represented Vietnam at Miss Supranational 2022, where she was the second runner-up, the highest achievement for Vietnam since the country entered the pageant. In the challenge events, she won the Miss Supra Chat award, together with Adinda Cresheilla of Indonesia.

Awards and achievements
Preceded by (South Africa) Thato Mosehle	Miss Supranational 2nd Runner-Up; 2022	Succeeded by (Brazil) Sancler Frantz
Preceded by (Trinidad and Tobago) Jenelle Thongs (Venezuela) Valentina Sánchez	Miss Supranational; Supra Chat Winner (Indonesia) Adinda Cresheilla; 2022	Succeeded by (Philippines) Pauline Amelinckx
Preceded by (China) Alice Li	Supra Model of the Year Asia; 2022	Succeeded by (Thailand) Patraporn Wang
Preceded by Hoàng Thị Thùy	Miss Cosmo Vietnam 1st Runner-Up; 2019	Succeeded by Lê Thảo Nhi
Preceded by Nguyễn Trần Khánh Vân	Miss Universe Vietnam; 2021	Succeeded by Nguyễn Thị Ngọc Châu
Preceded by Nguyễn Thị Ngọc Châu	Miss Supranational Vietnam; 2022	Succeeded by Đặng Thanh Ngân
Preceded by (Vietnam) Nguyễn Trần Khánh Vân	Fan Vote Winner Miss Universe; 2021	Succeeded by (Laos) Payengxa Lor
