= Miss Universe Vietnam 2017 =

3rd Miss Universe Vietnam pageant

- Date: January 6, 2018
- Presenters: Bùi Đức Bảo and Phan Thị Ngọc Diễm
- Venue: Crown Convention Center, Nha Trang, Khánh Hoà, Vietnam
- Broadcaster: VTV1; VTV6
- Entrants: 70
- Placements: 15
- Winner: H'Hen Niê; Đắk Lắk
- Congeniality: Nguyễn Thị Ngọc Anh; Hà Nội
- Best National Costume: Trình Thị Mỹ Duyên; Tuyên Quang
- Photogenic: Nguyễn Thị Ngọc Nữ; Nghệ An

Miss Universe Vietnam 2017 was the 3rd edition of the Miss Universe Vietnam pageant. It was held on January 6, 2018 at Crown Convention Center, Nha Trang. Miss Universe Vietnam 2015 Phạm Thị Hương crowned her successor H'Hen Niê at the end of the event. H'Hen Niê was appointed as Miss Universe Vietnam 2018 to represent Vietnam at Miss Universe 2018 in Bangkok, Thailand, finishing in the Top 5. Later, first runner-up Hoàng Thùy became Miss Universe Vietnam 2019 and represented the country at Miss Universe 2019 and finished in the Top 20.

The selection of Miss Universe Vietnam 2017 is accompanied by a reality television series called I Am Miss Universe Vietnam, in which contestants are put through different challenges and training programs in each weekly episode. Initially, the contest finale was scheduled to be held in August 2017. However, it was subsequently pushed back to December 2, 2017. The final was once again pushed back to January 6, 2018 amidst ongoing recovery efforts in Nha Trang - the host city - after Typhoon Damrey hit the region in early November.

== Results ==
=== Placements ===
Placement	Contestant
Miss Universe Vietnam 2017	Đắk Lắk – H'Hen Niê
1st Runner-Up	Thanh Hóa – Hoàng Thị Thùy
2nd Runner-Up	Hồ Chí Minh – Mâu Thị Thanh Thủy
Top 5	Hà Nội – Bùi Thanh Hằng; Hải Dương – Tiêu Ngọc Linh
Top 10	Hà Nam – Hoàng Lan; Bình Dương – Hoàng Như Ngọc; Hà Nội – Lê Thu Trang; Nghệ An – Nguyễn Thị Ngọc Nữ; Hà Nội – Nguyễn Thị Ngọc Anh
Top 15	Hà Nội – Lê Thanh Tú; Khánh Hòa – Lê Thị Minh Thiết; Hà Nội – Nguyễn Thị Anh; Thừa Thiên Huế – Trần Thị Thùy Trang; Hà Nội – Vũ Thị Tuyết Trang

=== Special awards ===
Special Award	Contestant
Miss Beach	H'Hen Niê – Đắk Lắk
Miss Ao Dai	Trình Thị Mỹ Duyên – Tuyên Quang
Miss Photogenic	Nguyễn Thị Ngọc Nữ – Nghệ An
Miss Congeniality	Nguyễn Thị Ngọc Anh – Hà Nội
People's Choice	Hoàng Thị Thùy – Thanh Hóa
Miss Talent	Hoàng Hải Thu – Hà Nội
Miss Sports	Huỳnh Thị Cẩm Tiên – An Giang

== Contestants ==
=== Top 45 final round ===
Contestants	Year of Birth	No.	Height (ft)	Hometown	Placements	Notes
Nguyễn Thị Anh	1993	236	1.83 m (6 ft 0 in)	Hà Nội	Top 15	
Nguyễn Thị Ngọc Anh	1993	303	1.76 m (5 ft 9 1/2 in)	Hà Nội	Top 10	
Mai Anh	1996	327	1.71 m (5 ft 7 1/2 in)	Hải Phòng		
Nguyễn Thanh Vân Anh	1993	423	1.69 m (5 ft 6 1/2 in)	TP.HCM		
Trình Thị Mỹ Duyên	1995	414	1.67 m (5 ft 5 1/2 in)	Tuyên Quang		
Lại Quỳnh Giang	1996	135	1.75 m (5 ft 9 in)	Hà Nội		
Bùi Thanh Hằng	1993	413	1.66 m (5 ft 5 1/2 in)	Hà Nội	Top 5	
Bùi Quỳnh Hoa	1998	330	1.72 m (5 ft 7 1/2 in)	Hà Nội		
Nguyễn Phương Hoa	1995	240	1.66 m (5 ft 5 1/2 in)	TP.HCM		
Bùi Lý Thiên Hương	1996	326	1.71 m (5 ft 7 1/2 in)	An Giang		
Lê Thị Thu Huyền	1997	117	1.67 m (5 ft 5 1/2 in)	Hải Phòng		
Đỗ Nguyễn Như Huỳnh	1998	315	1.72 m (5 ft 7 1/2 in)	Cà Mau		
Hoàng Lan	1997	104	1.67 m (5 ft 5 1/2 in)	Hà Nam	Top 10	
Tiêu Ngọc Linh	1994	349	1.76 m (5 ft 9 1/2 in)	Hải Dương	Top 5	
Hoàng Như Ngọc	1998	335	1.73 m (5 ft 8 in)	Bình Dương	Top 10	
Lê Thị Kiều Nhung	1998	333	1.80 m (5 ft 11 in)	Trà Vinh		
H'Hen Niê	1992	424	1.72 m (5 ft 7 1/2 in)	Đắk Lắk	Miss Universe Vietnam 2017	
Nguyễn Thị Ngọc Nữ	1994	346	1.65 m (5 ft 5 in)	Nghệ An	Top 10	
Lâm Quế Phi	1999	233	1.70 m (5 ft 7 in)	Đồng Nai		
Phan Thị Hồng Phúc	1996	247	1.68 m (5 ft 6 in)	Tiền Giang		
Chúng Huyền Thanh	1997	334	1.75 m (5 ft 9 in)	Hải Phòng		Withdrew
Lê Thị Minh Thiết	1997	213	1.75 m (5 ft 9 in)	Khánh Hòa	Top 15	
Nguyễn Thị Thơm	1994	210	1.68 m (5 ft 6 in)	Nghệ An		
Hoàng Hải Thu	1995	106	1.67 m (5 ft 5 1/2 in)	Hà Nội		
Nguyễn Thị Hồng Thương	1996	143	1.72 m (5 ft 7 1/2 in)	Vũng Tàu		
Nguyễn Thị Ngọc Thúy	1991	103	1.81 m (5 ft 11 1/2 in)	TP.HCM		
Hoàng Thị Thùy	1992	404	1.77 m (5 ft 9 1/2 in)	Thanh Hóa	1st Runner Up	
Mâu Thị Thanh Thủy	1992	242	1.77 m (5 ft 9 1/2 in)	TP.HCM	2nd Runner Up	
Huỳnh Thị Cẩm Tiên	1993	332	1.66 m (5 ft 5 1/2 in)	An Giang		
Hồ Thủy Tiên	1997	302	1.65 m (5 ft 5 in)	Đắk Nông		
Lê Thu Trang	1997	238	1.73 m (5 ft 8 in)	Hà Nội	Top 10	
Vũ Thị Tuyết Trang	1994	115	1.71 m (5 ft 7 1/2 in)	Hà Nội	Top 15	
Lê Thị Thu Trang	1998	121	1.71 m (5 ft 7 1/2 in)	Bắc Giang		
Chu Thị Minh Trang	1993	119	1.69 m (5 ft 6 1/2 in)	Hải Phòng		
Trần Thị Thùy Trang	1997	234	1.80 m (5 ft 11 in)	Thừa Thiên Huế	Top 15	
Đoàn Thị Hồng Trang	1995	350	1.72 m (5 ft 7 1/2 in)	Bình Thuận		
Hồ Thị Trinh Trinh	1998	100	1.72 m (5 ft 7 1/2 in)	Ninh Thuận		
Nguyễn Thị Mỹ Trinh	1994	307	1.74 m (5 ft 8 1/2 in)	Quảng Trị		
Trần Thị Ngọc Trúc	1996	420	1.72 m (5 ft 7 1/2 in)	Tiền Giang		
Ngô Thị Cẩm Tú	1996	314	1.70 m (5 ft 7 in)	Bắc Ninh		
Lê Thanh Tú	1996	127	1.67 m (5 ft 5 1/2 in)	Hà Nội	Top 15	
Lê Thị Ngọc Út (Bảo Ngọc)	1992	232	1.72 m (5 ft 7 1/2 in)	Kiên Giang		Withdrew
Nguyễn Diễm Uyên	1997	308	1.67 m (5 ft 5 1/2 in)	TP.HCM		Withdrew
Trần Thị Kim Vàng	1995	325	1.68 m (5 ft 6 in)	Long An		
Đỗ Lan Vy	1995	347	1.69 m (5 ft 6 1/2 in)	Đắk Lắk		

=== Top 70 preliminary ===
Name	Year of Birth	No.	Height	Hometown	Notes
Lê Thị Hải Anh	1995	213	1.70 m (5 ft 7 in)	Hà Nội	
Nguyễn Thị Lan Anh	1996	328	1.66 m (5 ft 5 1/2 in)	Quảng Ninh	
Nguyễn Thanh Phương Đài	1997	138	1.67 m (5 ft 5 1/2 in)	TP.HCM	
Phạm Thùy Dung	1991	225	1.69 m (5 ft 6 1/2 in)	Hải Phòng	
Lê Thị Mỹ Hạnh	1996	145	1.66 m (5 ft 5 1/2 in)	Cần Thơ	
Thái Thị Hoa	1994	241	1.75 m (5 ft 9 in)	Gia Lai	
Đỗ Hương Ly	1995	218	1.71 m (5 ft 7 1/2 in)	Thanh Hóa	
Ngô Thị Quỳnh Mai	1995	425	1.71 m (5 ft 7 1/2 in)	TP.HCM	
Lê Thị Minh Mẫn	1996	306	1.70 m (5 ft 7 in)	Hà Tĩnh	
Lê Thị Ánh Minh	1997	112	1.66 m (5 ft 5 1/2 in)	TP.HCM	
Lê Nguyễn Trà My	1998	305	1.73 m (5 ft 8 in)	Thanh Hóa	
Nguyễn Thị Ái Ngân	1995	200	1.65 m (5 ft 5 in)	Lạng Sơn	
Nguyễn Bảo Ngọc	1998	133	1.66 m (5 ft 5 1/2 in)	Hà Nội	
Phạm Thị Hồng Ngọc	1998	419	1.70 m (5 ft 7 in)	Quảng Ngãi	
Lê Nguyễn Thị Yến Nhi	1992	309	1.65 m (5 ft 5 in)	Bến Tre	
Phạm Thị Ngọc Quý	1995	203	1.78 m (5 ft 10 in)	TP.HCM	
Phạm Lê Bình Sơn	1997	239	1.67 m (5 ft 5 1/2 in)	Kiên Giang	
Vũ Thị Thanh Thanh	1997	109	1.68 m (5 ft 6 in)	Phú Thọ	
Huỳnh Thị Kim Thùy	1996	220	1.69 m (5 ft 6 1/2 in)	Long An	
Võ Thị Đài Trang	1996	316	1.67 m (5 ft 5 1/2 in)	Bình Thuận	
Nguyễn Thị Thanh Trang	1993	114	1.71 m (5 ft 7 1/2 in)	TP.HCM	
