= Vietnam's Next Top Model =

Vietnamese reality television show

- Created by: Tyra Banks
- Presented by: Vũ Anh Tuấn (live finale: Season 1-4); Tùng Leo (live finale: Season 5-9)
- Judges: Nathan Lee (Presumed head judge: Season 1-1st); Elizabeth Thủy Tiên (Season 1-1st); Hoàng Ngân (Season 1-1st); Hà Anh (Head judge: Season 1-2nd); Vũ Đức Hải (Season 1-2nd); Huy Võ (Season 1-2nd); Xuân Lan (Head judge: Season 2-3, 5); Phạm Hoài Nam (Season 2-3); Nam Trung (Season 2-5, 8-9); Đỗ Mạnh Cường (Season 2-4, 9); Adam Williams (Season 4-5); Hương Color (Season 5); Thanh Hằng (Head judge: Season 4, 6-7, 9); Adrian Anh Tuấn (Season 6); Samuel Hoàng (Season 6-7); Lý Quý Khánh (Season 7); Hà Đỗ (Season 7, 9); Trương Ngọc Ánh (Head judge: Season 8); Võ Hoàng Yến(Season 8, casting judge: 9); Mâu Thủy (casting judge : Season 9)
- Theme music composer: David Thomas - Les Pierce; Wanna Be On Top ?
- Country of origin: Vietnam
- Original languages: Vietnamese, English
- No. of seasons: 9
- No. of episodes: 113 (by season 10)

Production
- Executive producers: Lê Thị Quỳnh Trang; Ryan Hoang Hubris (Season 1-4)
- Producer: Hoa Thanh Tùng
- Production location: Ho Chi Minh City
- Running time: 60 minutes
- Production companies: Multimedia JSC; VTV

Original release
- Network: VTV
- Release: September 30, 2010 – present

Vietnam's Next Top Model (Người mẫu Việt Nam, or VNTM) is a Vietnamese reality television show in which contestants compete for the title of "Vietnam's Next Top Model." Contestants are given the opportunity to begin a career in the modeling industry, and the winner receives a modeling contract, a cash prize and a feature article in a fashion magazine.

== Background ==
The competition follows a group of female contestants (including male contestants from season 4-7) at least 18 years old. They live together in a house for several months and take part in various challenges, such as posing for photographs. Many episodes feature contestants meeting well-known figures in the modeling industry. In each episode, one or more contestants are eliminated, although multiple eliminations or zero elimination occasionally occur by consensus of the panel of judges. The winner will be crowned "Vietnam's Next Top Model", receiving a modeling contract and other prizes.

== Format ==
=== Requirements ===
Contestants must be between 18 and 25 years of age, and had to be Vietnamese citizens or foreigners of Vietnamese origin. From season four women had to be at least 5'7" (170 cm) tall and men at least 5'9" (175 cm) tall in order to compete. The contestants must not be managed exclusively by companies, agencies, or products and have no criminal record. In season seven, height and age requirements are removed.

== Judging ==
The first cycle was overseen by two panels of judges. The first included model Nathan Lee, who was scheduled to host the season with international model Elizabeth Thủy Tiên and fashion designer Hoàng Ngân. They were replaced by Hà Anh, Huy Võ and Đức Hải immediately after they were cast.

During season two, the judging panel was renewed and increased with influential figures in the Vietnamese fashion industry. Six former judges (from two panels) were replaced by a new panel. They included makeup artist Nam Trung, fashion designer Đỗ Mạnh Cường and fashion photographer Phạm Hoài Nam. Former model Xuân Lan was the host and head judge, remaining the host of the show with the exception of season four when she was pregnant (Thanh Hằng hosted that season). After hosting season four, Thanh Hằng returned as head judge in season six. On June 4, 2017, former host of Project Runway Vietnam Trương Ngọc Ánh was announced to be the new host of the show, replacing Thanh Hằng from season eight

Asia's Next Top Model season-two judge Adam Williams has been a recurring guest judge since season four, and a permanent judge in season five. That season, Đỗ Mạnh Cường was replaced by Samuel Hoàng.

In Cycle 6, former host Phạm Thị Thanh Hằng, who hosted Cycle 4 (the first guys-and-girls season of the show), returned to fulfill her position as head judge of the panel. Samuel Hoàng reprised his role as a judge after Cycle 5 concluded. Designer Adrian Anh Tuấn was also introduced as a new judge.

In Cycle 7, host Phạm Thị Thanh Hằng and Samuel Hoàng reprised their roles in the judging panel. Fashion designer Lý Quí Khánh and fashion stylist & Editor-in-Chief of Đẹp Magazine (where the word "Đẹp" is translated from Vietnamese, means beautiful) Hà Đỗ were introduced as new judges.

In Cycle 8, the entire panel of judges was replaced. The jury consisted of model-actress Trương Ngọc Ánh, make-up artist Nam Trung, and model Võ Hoàng Yến. Ngọc Ánh acted as the show's presenter, while Nam Trung served as the show's creative director and Hoàng Yến served as model mentor, respectively.

Judge	Cycle								
Judge	1 (2010)	2 (2011)	3 (2012)	4 (2013)	5 (2014)	6 (2015)	7 (2016)	8 (2017)	9 (2025)
Host
Hà Anh	Main								
Xuân Lan		Main	Main		Main				
Thanh Hằng				Main		Main	Main		Main
Trương Ngọc Ánh								Main	
Judging Panelists
Đức Hải	Main								
Huy Võ	Main								
Nam Trung		Main	Main	Main	Main			Main	Main
Đỗ Mạnh Cường		Main	Main	Main					Main
Phạm Hoài Nam		Main	Main						
Adam Williams				Main	Main				
Hương Color					Main				
Samuel Hoàng					Recurring	Main	Main	Guest	
Adrian Anh Tuấn						Main			
Lý Quí Khánh		Guest					Recurring		
Hà Đỗ							Main	Recurring	Main
Võ Hoàng Yến								Main	

== Cycles ==
Cycle	Premiere date	Winner	Runner-up	Other contestants in order of elimination	Number of contestants	International Destinations
1	30 September 2010	Khiếu Thị Huyền Trang	Nguyễn Thị Tuyết Lan	Lại Thanh Hương & Trần Lê Hoài Thương, Bùi Thị Thu Thùy, Nguyễn Thanh Hằng, Bùi Thị Hoàng Oanh, Nguyễn Diệp Anh, Hồ Mỹ Phương, Phạm Thị Hương, Nguyễn Giáng Hương, Đàm Thu Trang, Trần Thị Thu Hiền, Đỗ Thị Thanh Hoa, Nguyễn Thu Thủy	15	None
2	25 September 2011	Hoàng Thị Thùy	Nguyễn Thị Trà My	Lưu Khánh Linh, Kikki Lê, Huỳnh Thị Kim Tuyền, Dương Thị Dung, Phan Ngọc Phương Nghi & Nguyễn Thị Hoàng Oanh, Nguyễn Thùy Dương, Lê Thị Phương & Trần Thanh Thủy, Nguyễn Thị Tuyết, Nguyễn Thị Phương Anh, Nguyễn Thị Thùy Trang, Lê Thị Thúy	15	Singapore; Bangkok
3	19 August 2012	Mai Thị Giang	Kha Mỹ Vân	Nguyễn Thi Châm, Nguyễn Thi Hằng, Lương Thị Kim Loan, Lê Thị Hằng & Cao Thi Hà, Lê Thanh Thảo, Đỗ Thu Hà, Vũ Thị Minh Nguyệt, Nguyễn Thị Ngân & Dương Thị Thanh & Nguyễn Thị Ngọc Thúy & Nguyễn Thị Nhã Trúc, Cao Thị Thiên Trang	15	New York City
4	6 October 2013	Mâu Thị Thanh Thủy	Vũ Tuấn Việt	Nguyễn Quốc Minh Tòng & Lê Uyên Phương Thảo & Đỗ Thị Kim Ngân & Ngô Thị Quỳnh Mai, Tạ Thúc Bình & Phan Thị Thùy Linh, Phạm Thị Kim Thoa, Trần Mạnh Kiên, Nguyễn Trần Trung & Đinh Hà Thu, Nguyễn Thị Thanh, Trần Quang Đại, Dương Mạc Anh Quân & Nguyễn Thị Hằng, Lê Văn Kiên & Nguyễn Thị Chà Mi	18	Singapore; Paris
5	1 November 2014	Nguyễn Thị Oanh & Tạ Quang Hùng	Phạm Duy Anh & Tiêu Ngọc Linh & Cao Thị Ngân	Nguyễn Văn Thắng & Hồ Văn Năm, Nguyễn Thị Thanh Tuyền, Lê Đức Anh, Lê Thị Kim Dung, Trần Yến Nhi & Phạm Công Toàn, Chế Nguyễn Quỳnh Châu & Lê Đăng Khánh, Phạm Tấn Khang, Đặng Văn Hội	16	Bangkok; Rome; Milan
6	2 August 2015	Nguyễn Thị Hương Ly	Võ Thành An & Nguyễn Thị Hợp & Lương Thị Hồng Xuân	Nguyễn Thành Quốc, Nguyễn Thị Kim Phương & Trần Hải Đăng, Hoàng Gia Anh Vũ, Hoàng Anh Tú, H'Hen Niê & Đào Thị Thu, Nguyễn Thị Hồng Vân, Đinh Đức Thành & K’ Brơi	14	Singapore; Rome
7	17 July 2016	Nguyễn Thị Ngọc Châu	Nguyễn Huy Quang & La Thanh Thanh	Phạm Gia Long & Nguyễn Thị Thuỳ Dung, Trương Bùi Hoài Nam & Nguyễn Duy Minh & Hà Thị Út Trang, Nguyễn Anh Thư, Hoàng Minh Tùng, Bùi Huy Dương & Nguyễn Thị Phương, Vũ Trần Kim Nhã, Trần Thị Thuỳ Trâm, Trịnh Thu Hường & Nguyễn Thiếu Lan, Nguyễn Minh Phong & Trần Thị Thùy Trang	18	Sydney
8	24 June 2017	Lê Thị Kim Dung	Nguyễn Thùy Dương & Nguyễn Thị Chà Mi	Nguyễn Thị Phương Oanh, Lương Thị Hồng Xuân, Trần Thị Thuỳ Trâm, Nguyễn Hồng Anh, Nguyễn Thị Hoàng Oanh, Lại Thị Thanh Hương, Kikki Lê, Nguyễn Thị Hợp, Cao Thị Ngân & Cao Thị Thiên Trang	13	Seoul
9	3 August 2025	Lại Mai Hoa	Đỗ Phùng Hương Giang & Vũ Mỹ Ngân & Lê Thị Bảo Ngọc	Trương Thị Huyền Thương, Phạm Hoài An & Trần Tâm Thanh, Ngô Thị Hằng & Đỗ Thu Uyên, Dương Thị Kim Thanh & Trần Thị Diệp Lục, Lê Ngọc Ái Băng (quit), Lê Mi Lan, Trương Thị Tuyết Mai & Lê Minh Trà My	15	Paris

== Controversies ==
=== Season one ===
The original panel of judges, including Nathan Lee, Elizabeth Thủy Tiên, and Hoàng Ngân, was fired because of conflicts among themselves and with the producers. A new panel was introduced; the head judge position taken up by model Hà Anh, and others judges including designer Huy Võ and actor-model Đức Hải. Đức Hải was primarily known for appearing in made-for-television films, and Huy Võ was reportedly a student at the Fashion Institute of Design & Merchandising.

Despite signing non-disclosure agreements, several contestants appeared on other TV shows before their elimination (suggesting they had been eliminated). The first-season finale was reportedly taken from the fourth-season finale of Germany's Next Topmodel, and the finale's "live" photo shoot was reportedly staged.

One year since the show had concluded, the winner Khiếu Thị Huyền Trang decided to speak up demanding the prize from the VNTM Organizing Committee, as she still had not received any the prizes for the winner including: 1,000,000,000₫ from CA Models, contract with Wilhelmina Models in New York City, and the supplies of Revlon. The aforementioned 1,000,000,000₫ prize from CA Models was supposed to be a salary divided equally every month for two years, but the payments would cease if she ended the contract. However she did not receive any money from the work done each month with the agency, therefore she decided to end the contract in November 2011. Before that, in In August 2011, CA Models initiated her plan to go to New York City under the condition that she lost 5–7 kg. But the trip never happened due to the agency claiming the trip cost too much money and for many times thinking about going and then cancelling continuously until November 2011.

Khiếu Thị Huyền Trang was also supposed to get the 2-year supply of Revlon, but she never received it due to advertising for another cosmetics brand with an interview for a magazine. Concerning the reason why the organizers of Vietnam's Next Top Model have not yet given this award to Huyen Trang, makeup artist Minh Hoang of Revlon cosmetics frankly said: "The responsibility belongs to Ms. Quynh Trang (production director of Vietnam's Next Top Model - PV) - if you have taken money from people, then fulfill your commitment well before asking for more. Don't blame this on Huyen Trang or Revlon." Even the show's host Hà Anh has confirmed that the production had not yet awarded all the prizes to Huyen Trang.

=== Season two ===
Although head judge Xuân Lan, Nam Trung, Phạm Hoài Nam and Đỗ Mạnh Cường were chosen for their Vietnamese fashion-industry expertise, their lack of international experience was criticized. In response to questions from VTC News about qualifications for a top model, Elite Vietnam director Thúy Nga said that most finalists' body shapes were rough and disproportionate. She said, "Being a top model in three months is unbelievable" and considered the competition as primarily entertainment.

During filming, finalists Hoàng Oanh, Thùy Dương and Phương Nghi faced a lawsuit from producers for leaking the elimination order before the final episode. The lawsuit demanded 15 billion Vietnamese đồng (about US$714,000) for the contract violation. Around the New York Fashion Week (in which season-one winner Huyền Trang, season-one runner-up Tuyết Lan and season-two winner Hoàng Thùy participated), Tuyết Lan was named season-one winner over actual winner Huyền Trang in an email. According to executive producer Quỳnh Trang, it was a typographical error and Huyền Trang was the winner. Hà Anh said in an interview that based on their invitations, Hoang Thuy and Tuyet Lan might not walking at the New York Fashion Week. This caused antagonism between Quỳnh Trang and fellow judge Đỗ Mạnh Cường and Hà Anh. Hà Anh accused Quỳnh Trang of rigging the show and treating Huyền Trang unfairly, saying that the Vietnamese audience was misled and neither Lan nor Thùy walked at the New York Fashion Week. Huyền Trang later confirmed that she did not receive her billion-dong modelling contract, a trip to New York for training or a VND 200 million contract with Revlon cosmetics, declaring her intention to dissolve her relationship with the show. A post on the show's Facebook page called the situation a misunderstanding, saying that Trang was in breach of contract.

=== Season five ===
In its fifth season, Vietnam's Next Top Model crowned two winners: Quang Hùng and Nguyễn Oanh. Viewer reaction was negative, with the audience considering Oanh's victory undeserved. Xuân Lan later told the press that Oanh was a worthy winner, and the producers had received approval from the format distributor for two winners. According to finale host Tùng Leo, the photos from the live photo shoot were not shown because of the venue's poor lighting.

=== Season nine - Be Unique ===
After Vietnam's Next Top Model season 8 ended in 2017. In 2019, MultiMedia JSC will produce Vietnam's Next Top Model season 9 was announced with the theme "Be Unique", supermodel Võ Hoàng Yến was announced as host, season 4 winner Mâu Thủy was announced as professional consultant and Nam Trung was announced as creative director. At the same time, the Top Model Online 2019 contest was also held to find contestants.

However, due to the impact of the COVID-19 pandemic globally and Vietnam in 2020, the contest was postponed indefinitely. In 2025, that the show will returned as the Top Model Online 2024 contest was held. And the panel of judges also changed almost entirely, because two judges, Võ Hoàng Yến and Mâu Thủy, had children after the contest was postponed for 6 years.
