= Crown Convention Center =

Indoor arena in Khánh Hòa, Vietnam

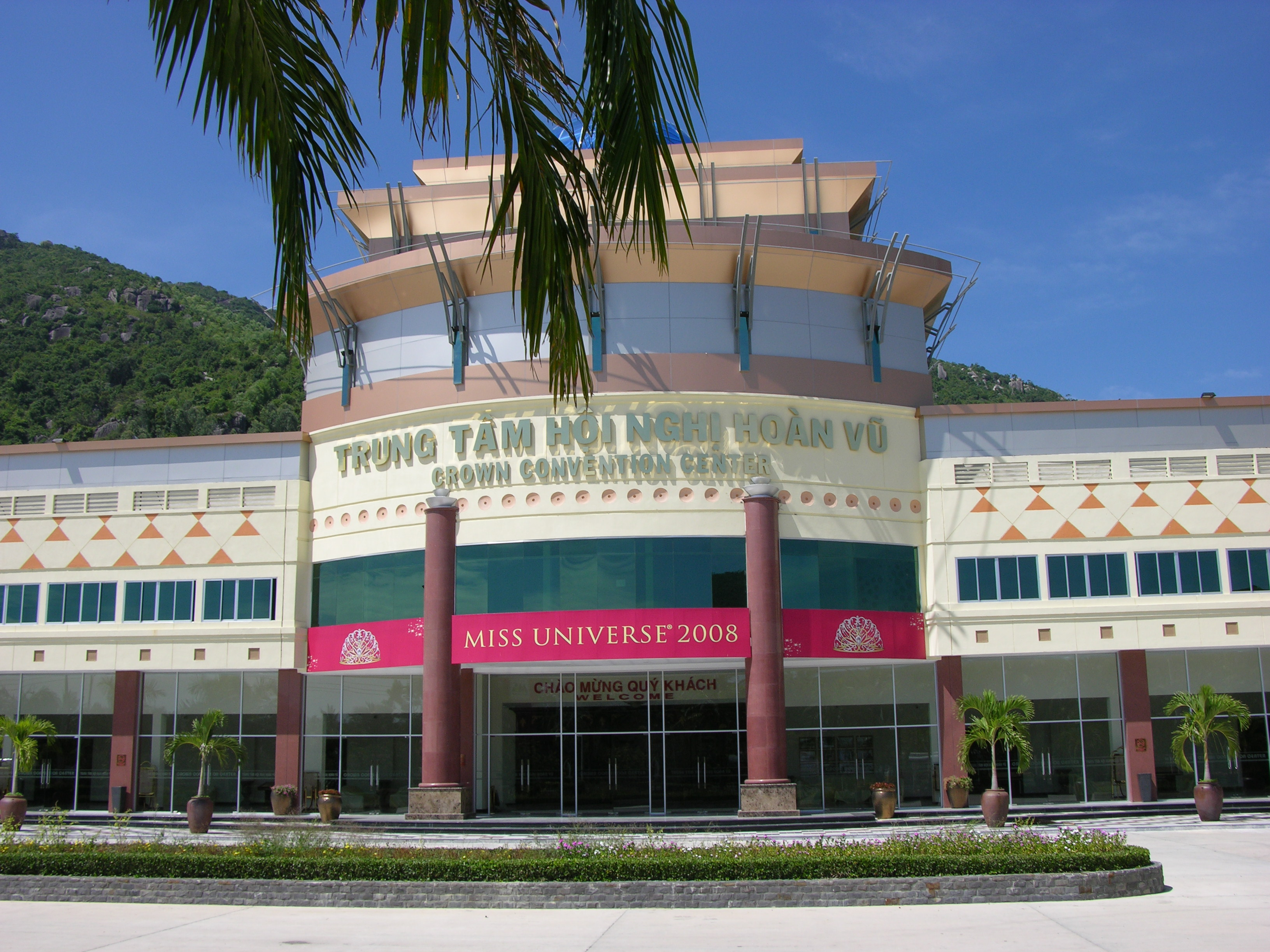
- Interactive map of Crown Convention Center
- Location: Nha Trang, Khánh Hòa, Vietnam
- Coordinates: 12°9′54″N 109°11′44″E
- Capacity: 7,500

Construction
- Built: 2008
- Opened: June 30, 2008; 18 years ago

Crown Convention Center is an indoor arena in Nha Trang, Khánh Hòa, Vietnam. It is the third biggest Convention Center on Southeast Asia, placed after the Sentul International Convention Center in Indonesia, with an arena of 1,500 square meters (16,000 sq ft), and was built in 2008. The Diamond Bay or the Nha Trang Tourism and Entertainment Area is 14 km (8.7 mi) away from the centre of the Nha Trang city. The 7,500-seat center is equipped with an audio and lightning system imported from the United States. The venue was opened in July 2008 to host the Miss Universe of that year.

== Architecture and facilities ==
The Crown Convention Center was designed as a multi-purpose indoor venue intended to accommodate large-scale international events, including cultural performances, exhibitions, and conferences. Its architectural layout follows a modern arena-style design, with flexible seating arrangements that allow the space to be adapted for different types of events.

Large convention venues in Southeast Asia are often developed as part of integrated tourism and entertainment zones, combining hospitality infrastructure such as hotels, resorts, and leisure facilities. According to studies on event tourism development in the region, such complexes are designed to attract international visitors and increase local economic activity through business and leisure tourism.

Convention centers in coastal tourism cities like Nha Trang also play a strategic role in hosting global events, which contributes to the international branding of the city as a tourism destination. Research on Vietnamese tourism infrastructure highlights that event-based facilities are key drivers in diversifying coastal economies beyond seasonal tourism.

== Events and usage ==
Since its opening, the venue has been used for international pageants, entertainment shows, and corporate conferences. Large convention centers in Vietnam are commonly utilized for both public and private events, reflecting the country's growing role in the global MICE (Meetings, Incentives, Conferences, and Exhibitions) industry.

The MICE sector is considered a significant contributor to tourism revenue in Southeast Asia, with countries like Vietnam investing in large-scale convention infrastructure to compete regionally.

Preceded by National Auditorium; Mexico City	Miss Universe venue 2008	Succeeded by Imperial Ballroom, Atlantis Paradise Island; Bahamas
