= The Amazing Race Vietnam 2019 =

Season of television series

- Season 2019
- Presented by: Song Luân (Episodes 1–6, 8–10); Hương Giang (Episode 7)
- No. of teams: 10
- Winners: Đặng Thị Lệ Hằng & H'Hen Niê
- No. of legs: 10
- No. of episodes: 10

Release
- Original network: VTV3
- Original release: 6 July – 7 September 2019

Additional information
- Filming dates: 17 May – 7 June 2019

Series chronology
- ← Previous; Season 5

The Amazing Race Vietnam: Cuộc đua kỳ thú 2019 is the sixth season of The Amazing Race Vietnam, a Vietnamese reality competition show based on the American series The Amazing Race. It featured ten teams of two celebrities in a race around Vietnam for 300 million₫.

The season premiered on VTV3 and aired every Saturday primetime (8:00 p.m. UTC+7) from 6 July to 17 September 2019.

Singer and The Voice of Vietnam contestant Song Luân as well as singer and former racer Hương Giang hosted this season replacing Huy Khánh.

Beauty queens Đặng Thị Lệ Hằng and H'Hen Niê were the winners of this season.

== Production ==
=== Development and filming ===
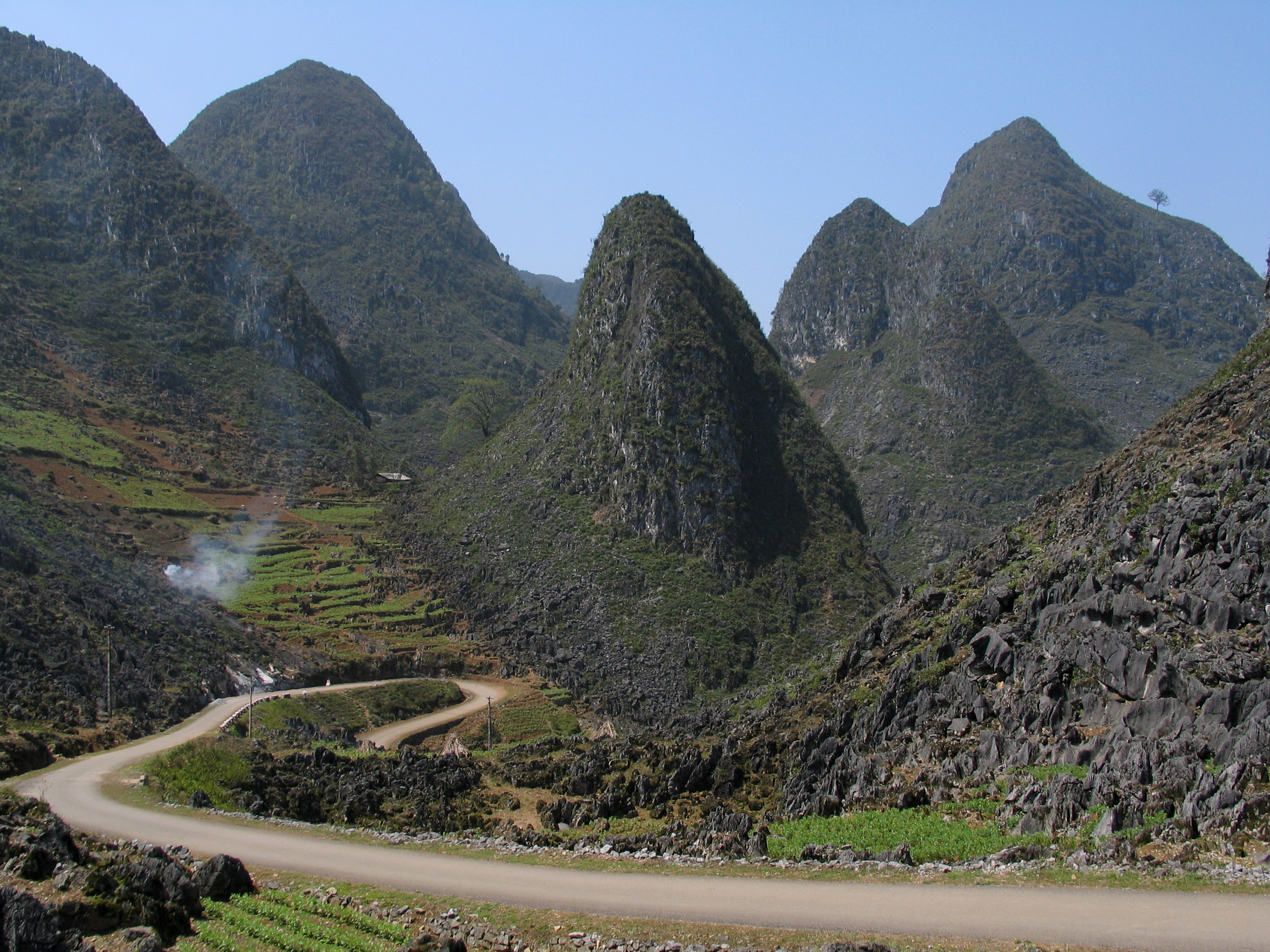
Teams began the sixth season of The Amazing Race Vietnam in Hà Giang Province by traveling through the Mã Pí Lèng Pass.

In May 2019, rumors circulated that VTV3 and BHD were attempting to revive the franchise after a three-year hiatus from the previous season. Soon after, open casting calls for a new season of The Amazing Race Vietnam appeared. Filming for this season began on May 17, 2019, when fans of the show spotted the racers in Hà Giang Province.

On May 28, 2019, Season 3 winner and Season 5 runner-up Hương Giang posted an image of the show's clue envelope onto her social media leading to speculation that she would appear on the season. Later that day, images surfaced of Hương Giang checking teams into the Pit Stop in Da Lat. It was later revealed that Hương Giang would be temporarily talking over the role of host due to Song Luân having work commitments. Hương Giang is the second former racer that returned to host the show after Toya Montoya, who hosted two seasons of the Latin American edition after competing on the third season, as well as the third woman, after Toya Montoya and Tara Basro, and the first member of the transgender community to serve as an Amazing Race host. This season is also the second time a show has changed hosts partway through filming after the first season of the Chinese edition. Hương Giang also made an appearance during Leg 3 as a judge in one of the challenges.

On June 2, 2019, the show's Facebook page officially announced the revival of the show prior to the completion of the season's filming.

This season was the first time that an Amazing Race franchise visited North Korea, a country the original American edition can't visit due to the prohibition of American travelers to the nation implemented after the death of Otto Warmbier, and was the first foreign reality show to film inside the nation.

This season featured a new twist on the Express Pass. The recipients of the Express Pass could either use it to skip a task of their choosing or use it to save a team from elimination, much like the Salvage Pass. It was subsequently used to save a team during the series's first instance of a Double Elimination. Also, much like the previous season, teams departed the Pit Stop in five-minute intervals instead of the actual time difference between check-ins, similar to the Chinese celebrity series.

For the first time in the franchise's history, four teams crossed the Finish Line in the final leg. Four teams raced on the final legs of Season 25 and Season 26 of the American edition; unlike the former, a fourth team was eliminated early in the leg before reaching the Finish Line.

=== Marketing ===
Sting Energy Drink, the primary sponsor of the previous seasons, returned for this season. TikTok and Vingroup also came on as sponsors.

== Cast ==
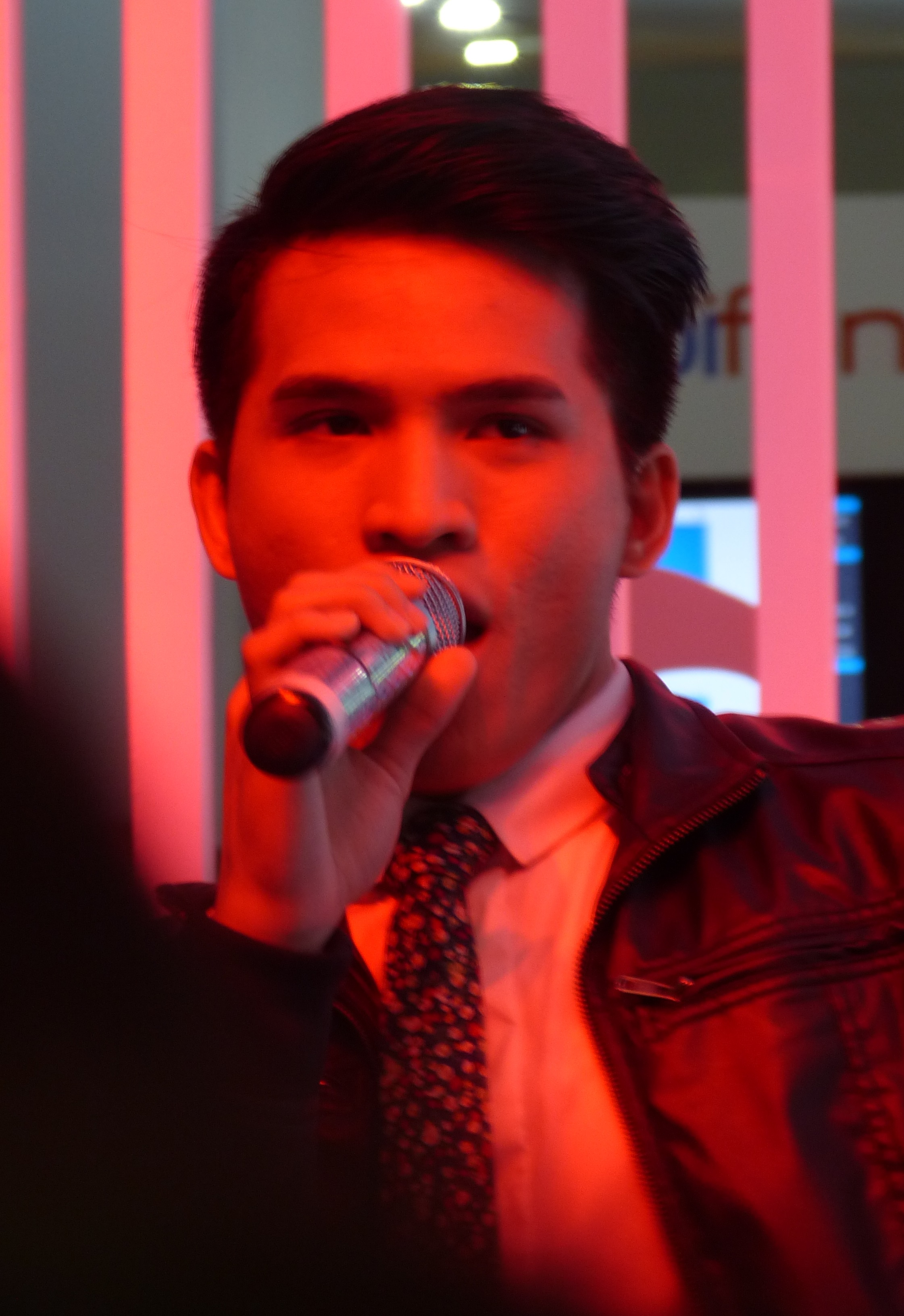
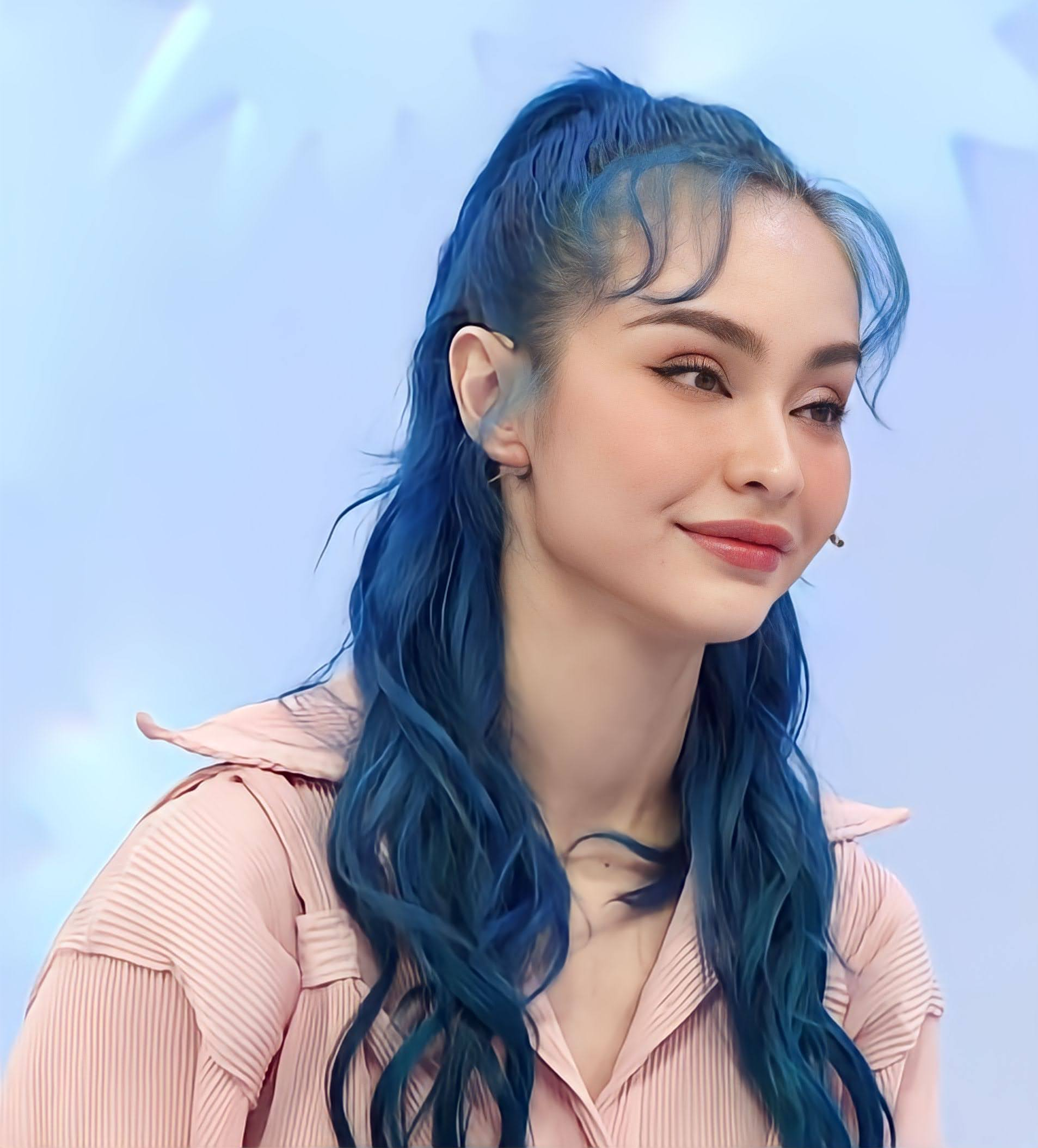
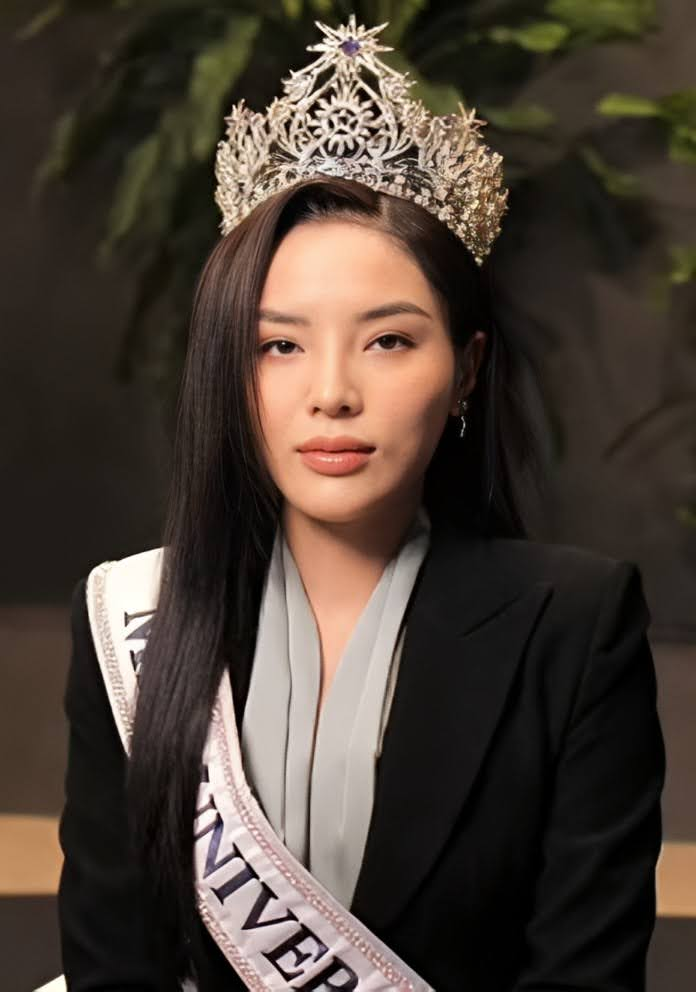
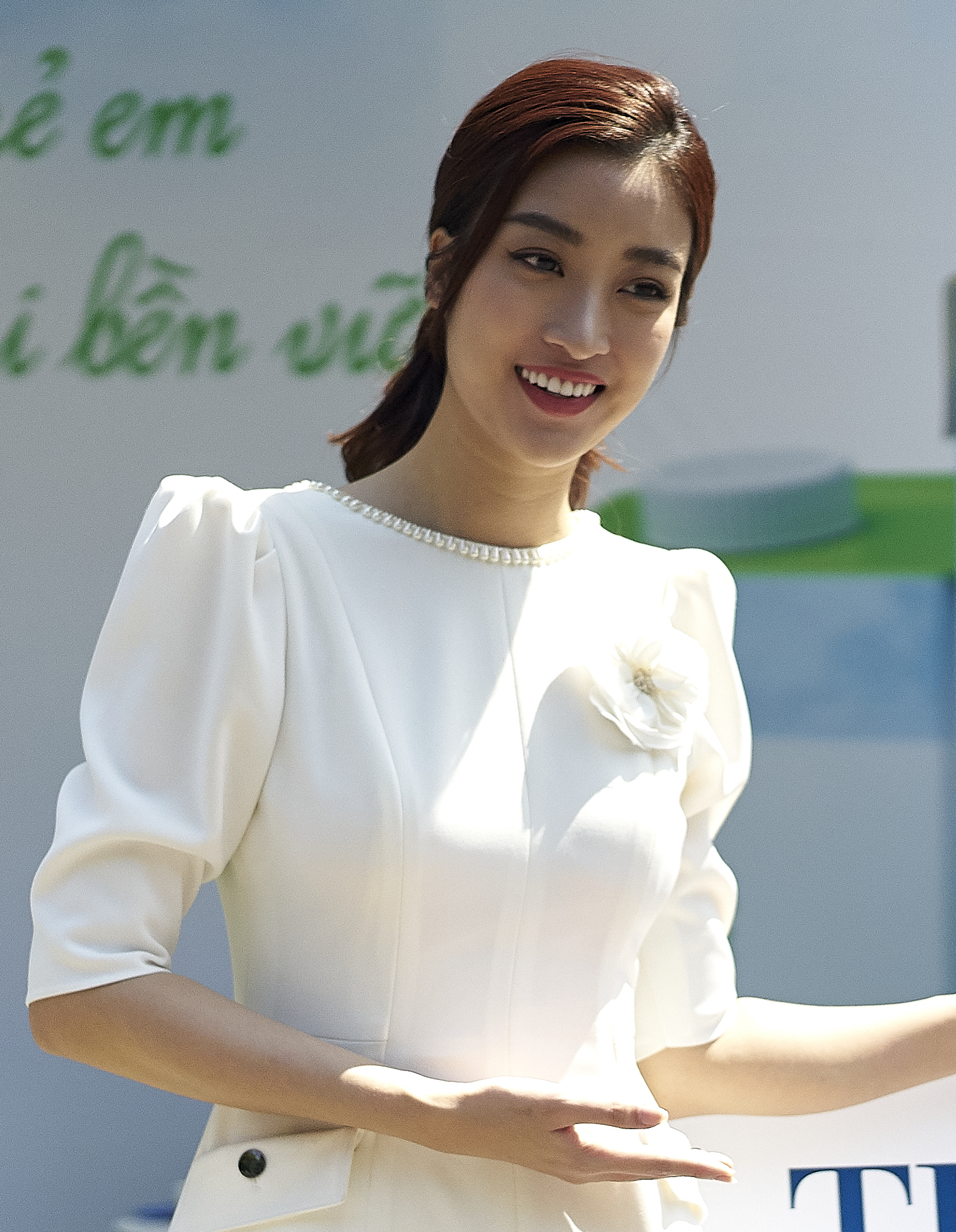
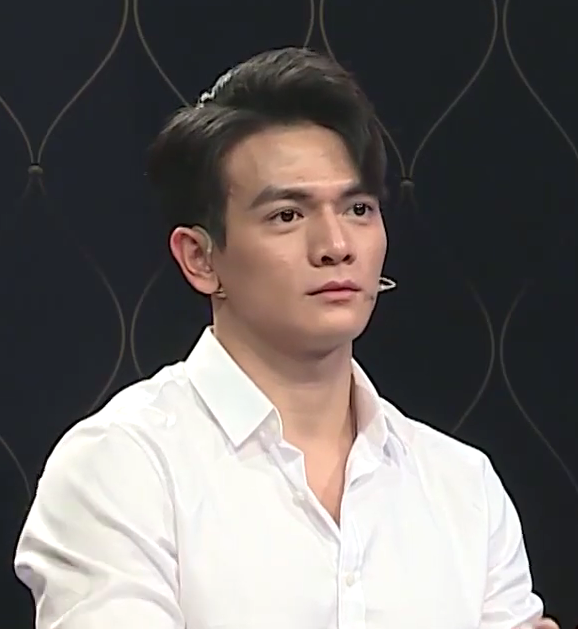
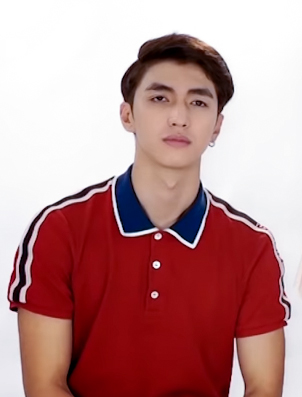
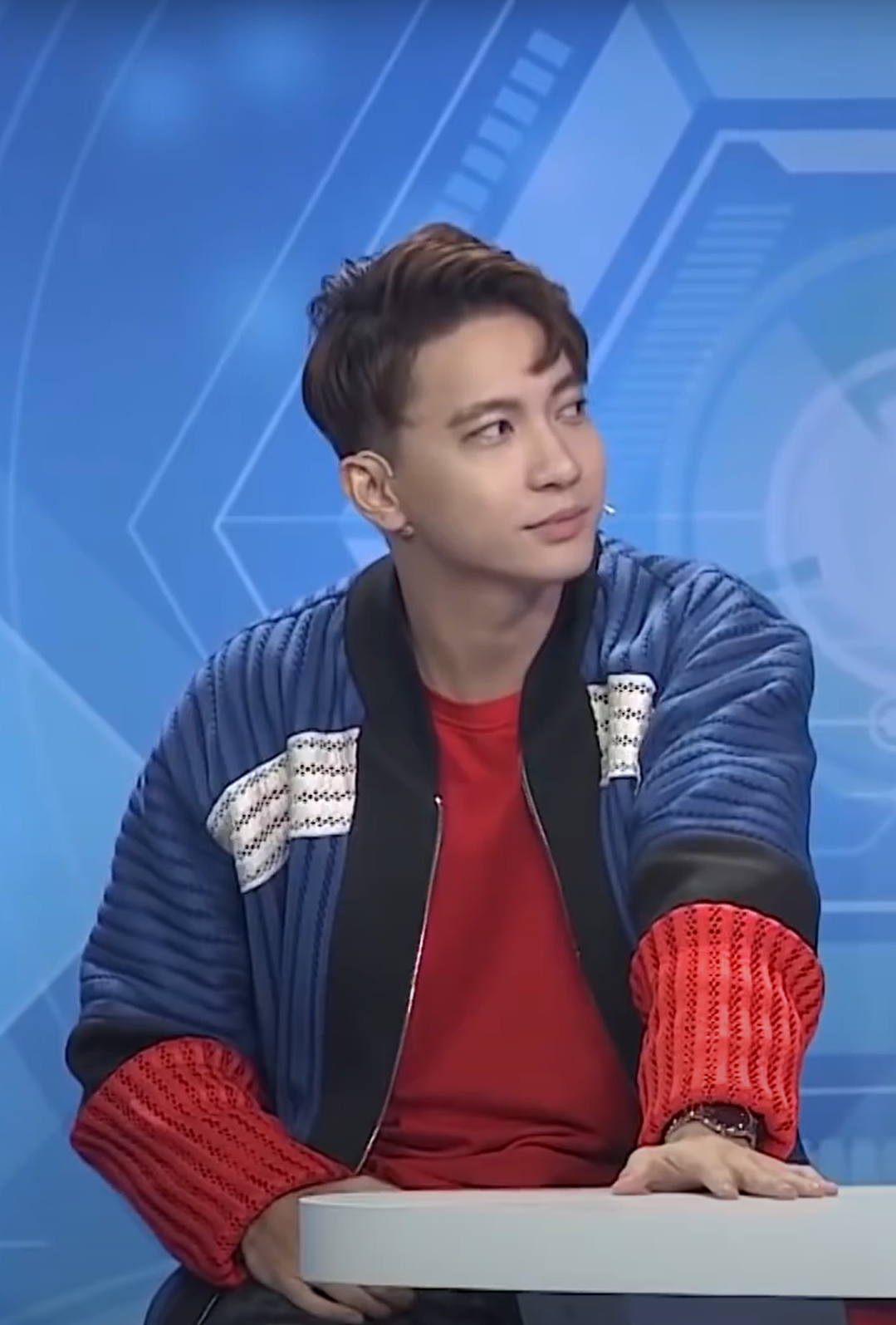
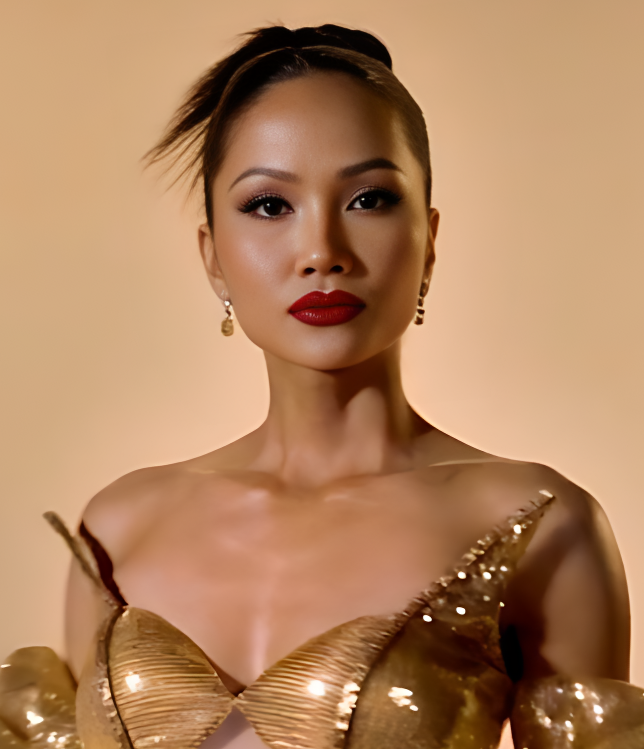
From left to right: Quốc Thiên, MLee, Kỳ Duyên, Mỹ Linh, Xuân Tiền, Bình An, S.T Sơn Thạch and H'Hen Niê

On June 6, 2019, the cast was officially announced. This season's cast included Miss Universe Vietnam 2017 H'Hen Niê, Miss Universe Vietnam 2015 runner-up Đặng Thị Lệ Hằng, Miss Vietnam 2014 Nguyễn Cao Kỳ Duyên, actor Bình An, Vietnam Idol Season 2 winner Quốc Thiên, Miss Vietnam 2016 Đỗ Mỹ Linh, and model Lê Xuân Tiền. Singer S.T Sơn Thạch previously competed on The Amazing Race Vietnam 2013 with stuntman Lâm Hùng Phong but was part of the first team eliminated.

Contestants	Age	Profession	Hometown	Status
Chu Minh Vũ	40	Journalist	Bắc Ninh, Bắc Ninh	Eliminated 1st (in Quản Bạ, Hà Giang)
Vũ Xuân Tiến	26	Sports Editor	Hải Dương, Hải Dương	Eliminated 1st (in Quản Bạ, Hà Giang)
Trương Phạm "Emma" Nhất Khanh	24	Singer	Cà Mau, Cà Mau	Eliminated 2nd (in Hạ Long, Quảng Ninh)
Tôn Kinh Lâm	24	Actor	Da Nang	Eliminated 2nd (in Hạ Long, Quảng Ninh)
Minh Triệu Phạm Định	(Returned to competition)			Eliminated 3rd (in Kon Tum, Kon Tum)
Kỳ Duyên Nguyễn Cao	(Returned to competition)			Eliminated 3rd (in Kon Tum, Kon Tum)
Dương Mạc Anh Quân	30	Model	Hanoi	Eliminated 4th (in Kon Tum, Kon Tum)
Quốc Thiên Trần	31	Singer	Gia Kiệm, Đồng Nai	Eliminated 4th (in Kon Tum, Kon Tum)
Hoàng Hạnh	27	Beauty Queen	Thái Hòa, Nghệ An	Eliminated 5th (in Tuy Hòa, Phú Yên)
Lương Gia Huy	27	Actor	Ho Chi Minh City	Eliminated 5th (in Tuy Hòa, Phú Yên)
Trần Hoàng "Johnny" Phương	27	Master Trainer	Germany	Eliminated 6th (in Da Lat, Lâm Đồng)
Huy Trần	29	Businessman	Berlin, Germany	Eliminated 6th (in Da Lat, Lâm Đồng)
Trần Quốc Anh	21	Actor	Hanoi	Eliminated 7th (in Ho Chi Minh City)
Maily "MLee" Tapiau	27	Singer	Ho Chi Minh City	Eliminated 7th (in Ho Chi Minh City)
Minh Triệu Phạm Định	31	Supermodel	Phú Yên	Fourth Place
Kỳ Duyên Nguyễn Cao	23	Beauty Queen	Nam Định, Nam Định	Fourth Place
Đỗ Mỹ Linh	23	Beauty Queen	Hanoi	Third Place
Lê Xuân Tiền	23	Actor	Phú Yên	Third Place
"S.T" Sơn Thạch Nguyễn Cao	29	Singer; The Amazing Race Vietnam 2013	Ho Chi Minh City	Second Place
Bình An Nguyễn	26	Actor	Phú Thọ, Phú Thọ	Second Place
Lệ Hằng Đặng Thị	26	Beauty Queen	Da Nang	Winners
H'Hen Niê	27	Beauty Queen	Buôn Ma Thuột, Đắk Lắk	Winners

== Results ==
The following teams participated in the season, with their relationships at the time of filming and designated team colors. Note that this table is not necessarily reflective of all content broadcast on television due to inclusion or exclusion of some data. Placements are listed in finishing order:

Team	Position (by leg)										Roadblocks performed
Team	1	2	3	4	5^{5}	6	7	8	9	10	Roadblocks performed
Lệ Hằng & H'Hen Niê	4th	5th	7th^{3}	5th	2nd	2nd^{6}	3rd	1st	2nd	1st	Lệ Hằng 3, H'Hen Niê 5
S.T & Bình An	1st	1st	1st	1st	3rd	2nd^{6}	2nd	3rd	1st	2nd	Sơn Thạch 4, Bình An 4
Xuân Tiền & Mỹ Linh	6th	3rd	3rd	4th	4th	1stƒ	1st^{7}	2nd	3rd	3rd	Xuân Tiền 4, Mỹ Linh 3
Minh Triệu & Kỳ Duyên	8th	8th	4th	3rd	7thß	5th	4th	4th	4th	4th	Minh Triệu 4, Kỳ Duyên 4
MLee & Quốc Anh	2nd	2nd	2nd	2nd	1st	4th	5th⊃	5th			MLee 4, Quốc Anh 3
Johnny & Huy Trần	3rd	7th	5th	7th^{4}	6th	6th	6th⊂^{8}				Johnny 3, Huy Trần 3
Gia Huy & Hoàng Hạnh	9th^{1}	9th	6th	6th	5th	7th					Gia Huy 4, Hoàng Hạnh 1^{2}
Quốc Thiên & Anh Quân	5th	4th	8th^{3}	7th^{4}	8th						Quốc Thiên 2, Anh Quân 2
Emma & Kinh Lâm	7th	6th	9th								Emma 1, Kinh Lâm 1
Xuân Tiến & Minh Vũ	9th^{1}	10th									Xuân Tiến 0, Minh Vũ 1

Key

- A red team placement means the team was eliminated.
- A green ƒ indicates that the team won a Fast Forward.
- A purple ε indicates that the team decided to use the Express Pass on that leg to skip a task, while a fuchsia ß indicates that the team was saved from elimination by the Express Pass holders.
- A blue team's placement indicates that the team came in last but was not eliminated.
  - An italicized blue placement indicates that the team came in last on a non-elimination leg and would not receive any money or provided vehicles during the next leg.
  - A bold blue team placement indicates that the team came in last on a non-elimination leg and would have to wait an extra 90 minutes before departing on the next leg.
- A brown ⊃ means the team chose to use a U-Turn; ⊂ indicates the team who received it.

Notes

1. Both Lương Gia Huy & Hoàng Hạnh and Vũ Xuân Tiến & Chu Minh Vũ elected to take a 20-minute penalty for not finding a clue during the first task. They checked into the Pit Stop at the same time in last place; however, both teams were not eliminated as Song Luân notified them that Leg 1 was a non-elimination leg.
2. Hoàng Hạnh elected to perform the Roadblock on Leg 2 but decided to switch and allow her partner Lương Gia Huy to complete the Roadblock as permitted in this task. As she initially declared that she would perform the Roadblock, this is included in her tally.
3. As both Lệ Hằng & H'Hen Niê and Quốc Thiên & Anh Quân could not row across the lake as part of the Detour, their teams were both issued a 2-hour penalty at the site and had to hold heavy logs on their shoulders while waiting out their penalty.
4. Johnny & Huy Trần initially arrived 7th, but were issued a 15-minute penalty for covering their Sting case during the final task, which was explicitly prohibited in the clue (Lương Gia Huy & Hoàng Hạnh had also covered the case but their case was also wet, so they had to redo the task and were not issued a penalty). Quốc Thiên & Anh Quân arrived at the Pit Stop right when the penalty-time expired, resulting in both teams checking into the Pit Stop simultaneously in last place. However, both teams were not eliminated as Song notified them that Leg 4 was a non-elimination leg.
5. Leg 5 was a double-elimination leg. The last two teams checked in at the Pit Stop were both eliminated. Minh Triệu & Kỳ Duyên were initially eliminated for arriving 7th, but S.T Sơn Thạch & Bình An used their Express Pass to save them from elimination.
6. Lệ Hằng & H'Hen Niê and S.T Sơn Thạch & Bình An both agreed to a 2nd place tie after both teams stepped on the Pit Stop mat at the same time.
7. Lê Xuân Tiền & Đỗ Mỹ Linh were issued two penalties totalling one hour and 44 minutes (90 minutes for failing to complete the Roadblock, and 14 minutes for breaking seven eggs during the Roadblock). They also received a time credit due to production difficulties. However, neither the penalties nor the time credit affected their placement, and it was unaired.
8. Johnny & Huy Trần were issued a 15-minute penalty for violating traffic laws while cycling to the Roadblock. As they arrived last to the Pit Stop, they were eliminated without the penalty being applied.

== Prizes ==
- Leg 1 – The Express Pass (Thẻ Ưu Tiên)
- Leg 10 – 300,000,000₫

== Race summary ==
Map of the sixth TAR Vietnam

Destinations	Air travel Rail travel Water travel Bus travel Helicopter travel Bicycle travel Gondola travel
Route Markers	Lựa chọn kép (Detour) Vượt rào (Roadblock) Nhảy cóc (Fast Forward); Rào cản (U-Turn) Về đích (Pit Stop)

=== Leg 1 (Hà Giang) ===
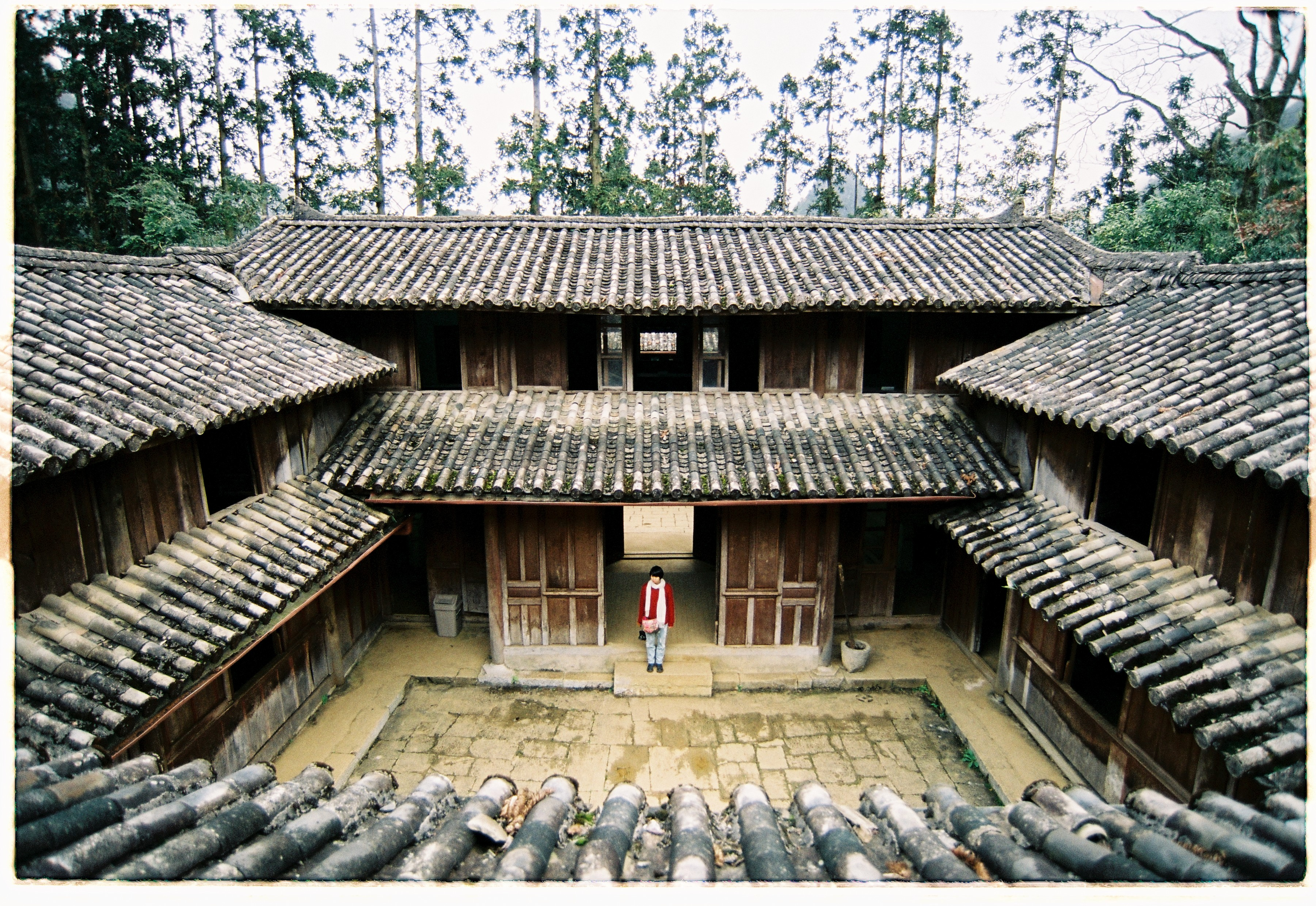
The Hmong Royal Palace in Sà Phìn hosted the first Pit Stop.

Airdate: 6 July 2019

- Pả Vi, Hà Giang Province, Vietnam (Hmong Ethnic Community Cultural Tourism Village) (Starting Line)
- Pả Vi (Xúa Vừ Homestay)
- Pải Lủng (Mã Pí Lèng B Village)
- Pải Lủng (Mã Pí Lèng Pass)
- Sà Phìn (Hmong Royal Palace (in Vietnamese))

Additional tasks

- At the Hmong Ethnic Community Cultural Tourism Village, teams had to search the nearby hills for a hidden clue.
- At Xúa Vừ Homestay, teams had to randomly choose a number that corresponded to a pig and then had to paint a provided design onto that pig to receive their next clue.
- After painting their pig, teams had to ride a motorcycle to their next clue, which instructed teams to hike down five kilometres (3.1 mi) to Mã Pí Lèng B Village, where they had to perform one of four randomly selected village chores to receive their next clue. The first chore required that teams assemble a stone wall between two flags high enough to reach a rope. The second chore required that teams cut a marked section of grass, bring it back to the village, and then chop up the grass to feed it to the cattle. The third chore required that each team member fill a basket with cow manure and use the manure to fertilize corn. The fourth chore required that teams grind corn.
- At Mã Pí Lèng Pass, one team member had to rappel into the pass, retrieve half of a clue, and climb back up a 60-metre (200 ft) ladder with their clue in a basket on their back while their partner had to learn to play a tune on a bamboo flute called a sáo to receive the other half of their clue.

=== Leg 2 (Hà Giang) ===
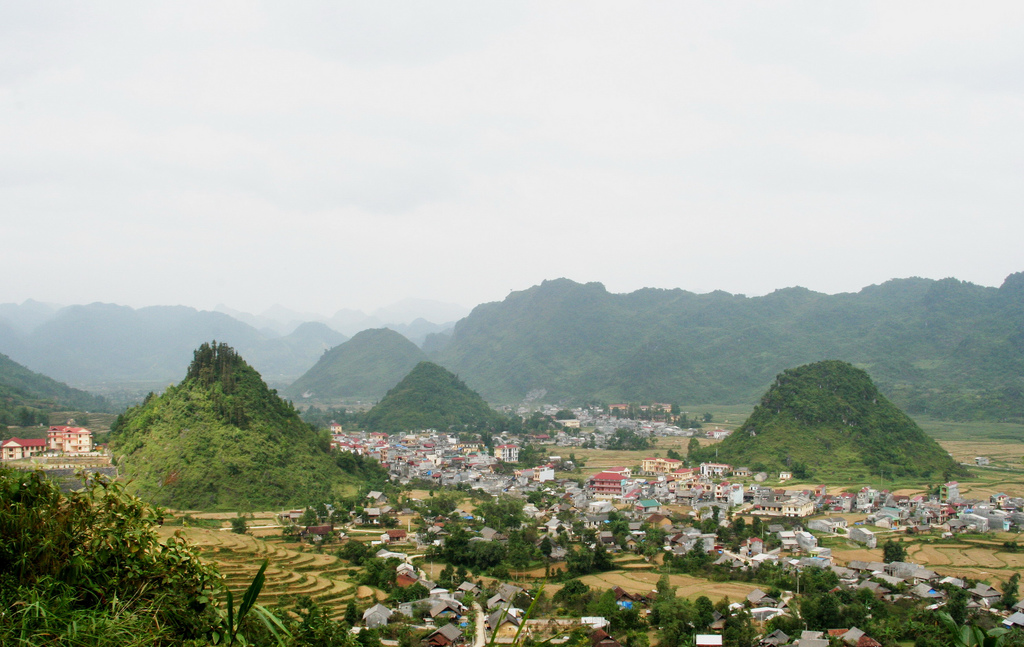
Teams ended their second leg in Hà Giang Province in the town of Tam Sơn.

Airdate: 13 July 2019

- Đồng Văn (Thẩm Mã Slope) (Pit Start)
- Yên Minh (Yên Minh Off-Road Racing Area)
- Lao Và Chải (Homestay Ngán Chải)
- Cho Kem (Mường Homestay or Phở Tráng Kìm)
- Quản Bạ (Nam Dam Hamlet Cultural Museum)
- Tam Sơn (Quản Bạ Stadium)

In this season's first Roadblock, one team member had to solve a brain teaser: "A father has six children and a 5x5 square piece of land and must divide the land so each child has a piece while the father retains the center piece of land." Team members had five minutes to remove bamboo sticks used to create the grid of 25 squares until they removed enough to form six shapes with the center square still untouched to receive their next clue, otherwise they had to wait a fifteen-minute penalty before making another attempt. Both team members could collaborate with each other while waiting out penalties, but only the participating member could move the bamboo. Also, teams were also allowed to switch who was performing the Roadblock only once during the task.

This season's first Detour was a choice between Làm? (Make?) or Ăn? (Eat?). In Make?, teams had to prepare fifteen noodle cakes (cái bánh phở) from five kilograms (11 lb) of bánh phở to receive their next clue. In Eat?, each team member had to eat three bowls of phở Tráng Kìm to receive their next clue.

Additional tasks

- Teams began the leg at the bottom of Thẩm Mã Slope and had to make their way to the top of a series of switchbacks by either hiking or hitchhiking a ride to receive their next clue and a motorcycle, with the exception of the teams that finished last in the previous leg.
- At Yên Minh Off-Road Racing Area, teams had to follow a drone carrying a bottle of Sting Energy Drink while on a dirt bike that would lead teams to hidden bottles of Sting. Teams then had to look inside these bottles until they found one that contained their next clue.
- The next day at Nam Dam Hamlet Cultural Museum, teams had to run through a muddy course past two defenders to a board with a hole in the centers atop a pole. There, one team member at a time would be harnessed to a bungee cord and had to successfully throw three basketballs through the hole to receive their next clue. If unsuccessful after ten tosses, they would have to run the course again, but any shots they did make would be carried over to the next attempt.

=== Leg 3 (Hà Giang → Quảng Ninh) ===
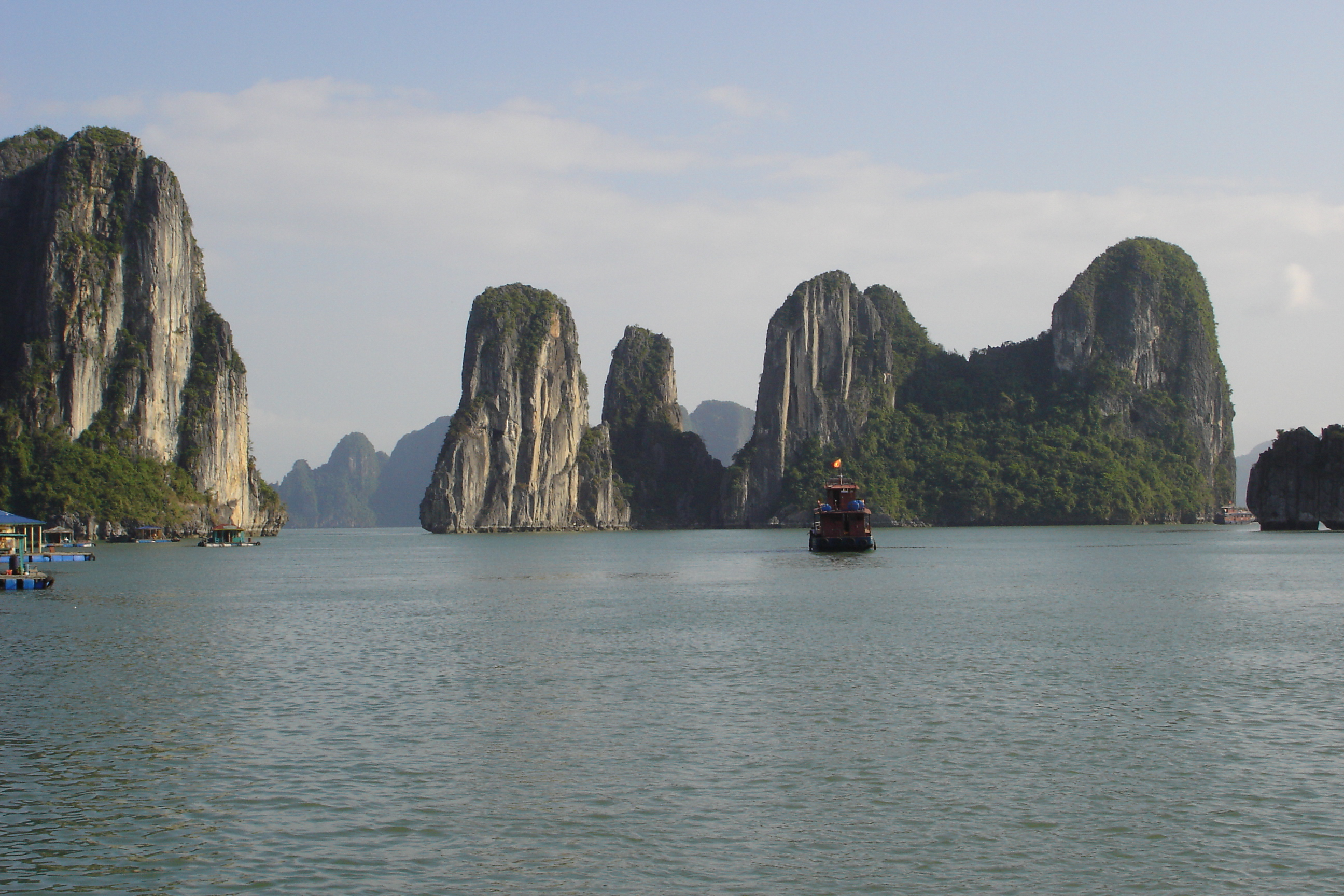
The Roadblock in Quảng Ninh Province took place among the islands of Hạ Long Bay.

Airdate: 20 July 2019

- Đại Yên, Quảng Ninh Province (Yên Lập Lake Island) (Pit Start)
- Đại Yên (Bến Đò Chùa Lôi Âm)
- Đại Yên (Lôi Âm Pagoda (in Vietnamese))
- Hạ Long (Hồng Gai Pier (in Vietnamese))
- Hạ Long Bay (Vụng Hà Island)
- Hạ Long Bay (Khủng Hà Island)
- Hạ Long (Hạ Long Flower Park)
- Hạ Long (Dragon Bay Square)

This leg's Detour was a choice between Mềm (Soft) or Cứng (Hard). For both Detour options, teams had to row a sampan from an island on Yên Lập Lake to a nearby pier and then hike to their chosen task. In Soft, teams had to bring fifteen pieces of tofu on one dish to the Lôi Âm Pagoda to receive their next clue. In Hard, teams had to bring ten bricks to Lôi Âm Pagoda to receive their next clue.

In this leg's Roadblock, teams had to travel by boat to Hòn Vụng Hà. There, one team member had to climb a 40-metre (130 ft) rope up one of the islands, pull themselves across a 120-metre (390 ft) zip line across to another island, and climb down a 40-metre (130 ft) ladder to receive their next clue.

Additional tasks

- At Khủng Hà Island, one team member had to stand on a floating platform and hold a basket connected to a pulley. Their partner had to fill bags with sand and toss them into the basket. Male team members had to hold up four bags for five seconds, while female team members had to hold up three bags, to receive their next clue from former racer Hương Giang.
- The next day at Hạ Long Flower Park, one team member would present a unique message in flag semaphore to their partner, who had to correctly decipher the message to receive their next clue.

=== Leg 4 (Quảng Ninh → Quảng Bình) ===
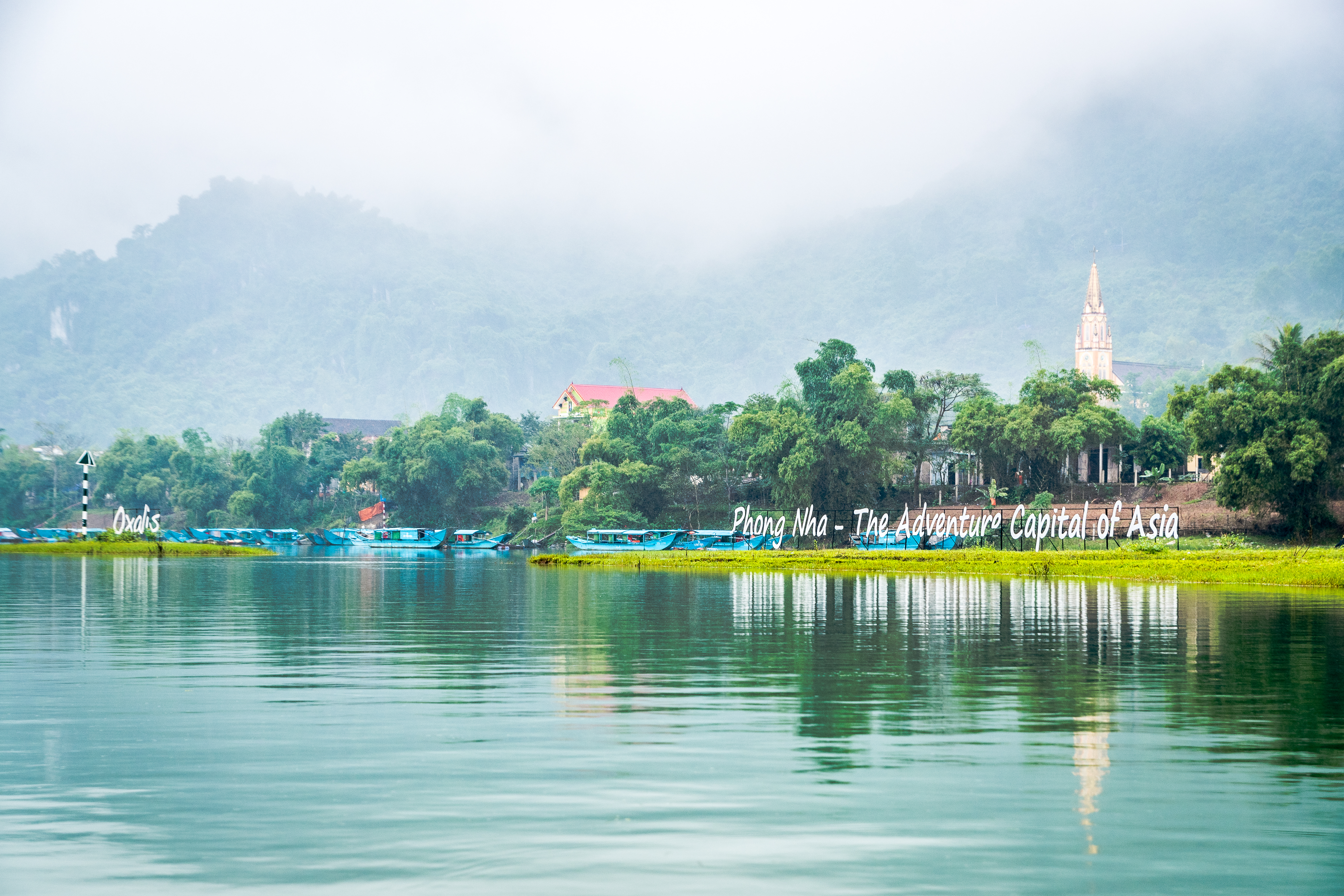
Teams traveled to the village of Phong Nha before exploring the caves of Phong Nha-Kẻ Bàng National Park.

Airdate: 27 July 2019

- Đồng Hới, Quảng Bình Province (Đồng Hới Citadel) (Pit Start)
- Bảo Ninh, Đồng Hới (Nhật Lệ River Waterfront)
- Phong Nha (Ho Khanh's Homestay to Côn River Island)
- Tân Trạch (Trạ Ang Spring)
- Tân Trạch (Trạ Ang Cave)
- Tân Trạch (Tám Cô Cave (in Vietnamese))

In this leg's Roadblock, one team member had to lead or ride a water buffalo across the Côn River to the riverbank to receive their next clue.

Additional tasks

- At Nhật Lệ River Waterfront, teams had to help prepare a local fish sauce. They had to transfer 20 big fish and 15 kilograms (33 lb) of small fish off of a fishing boat, cut off the heads and tails of the fish, and then pack the fish into a barrel and large jar with salt to receive their next clue.
- At Ho Khanh's Homestay, teams had to board a kayak and paddle along the Côn River to an island with their next clue.
- At Trạ Ang Spring, one team member would be blindfolded and had to step over a series of tripwires, hit two clay pots with a stick, pass the stick through a tire, and hit a third clay pot to receive their next clue. Their partner would use a drum and whistle to guide them. If the blindfolded team member touched a string or a tire, they would have to attempt the obstacle they touched again.
- At Trạ Ang Cave, teams had to swim through the cave to a case of Sting Energy Drink and then bring the case out of the cave on a raft without getting the case wet to receive their next clue.

=== Leg 5 (Quảng Bình → Kon Tum) ===
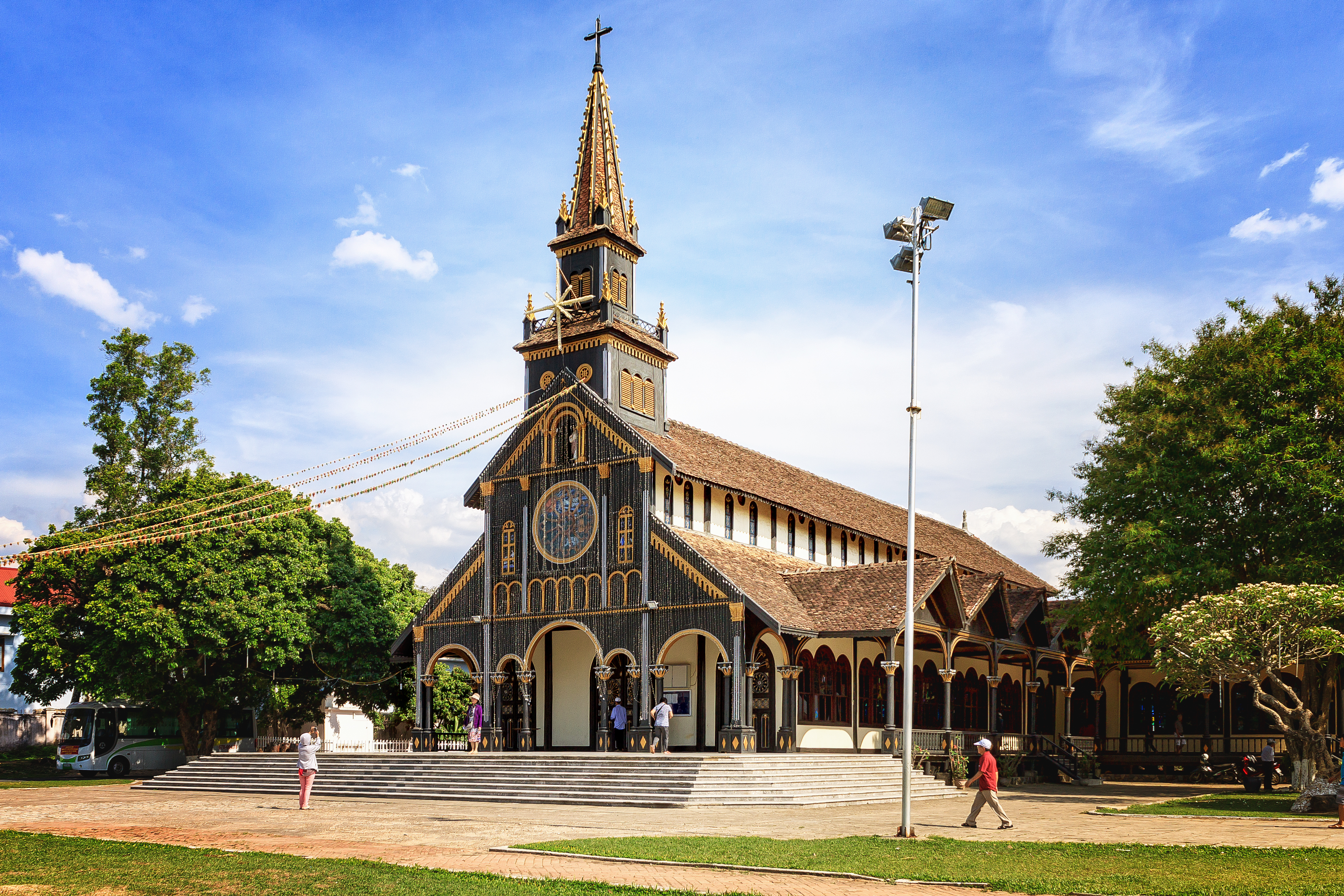
The wooden cathedral in Kon Tum served as the fifth Pit Stop.

Airdate: 3 August 2019

- Kon Tum, Kon Tum Province (Bác Ái Pagoda) (Pit Start)
- Kon K'tu (Đăk Bla River (in Vietnamese))
- Kon K'tu (Rông or House)
- Kon Tum (Nhà Rông Kon Klor)
- Kon Tum (Ngô Mây (in Vietnamese))
- Kon Tum (Cathedral of Kon Tum)

This leg's Detour was a choice between Nhạc (Music) or Dệt (Weaving). In Music, teams had to learn and correctly recite a Bahnar song to receive their next clue. In Weaving, teams had to weave a section of cloth on a loom to the satisfaction of the weavers to receive their next clue.

In this leg's Roadblock, one team member had to drive a tractor through a farm to reach a ball that they had to toss into their assigned hole to receive their next clue.

Additional tasks

- In Kon K'tu, teams had to board a dugout canoe and paddle upstream along the Đăk Bla River to retrieve bushels of bananas that they had to bring back to the village and had a minimum total weight of 35 kilograms (77 lb) to receive their next clue. If a team brought less than the required weight, they had to serve a ten-minute per kilogram penalty before receiving their clue.
- At Nhà Rông Kon Klor, teams had to choose a Jarai wooden tomb statue and carve a replica into a piece of wood to receive their next clue.

=== Leg 6 (Kon Tum → Phú Yên) ===
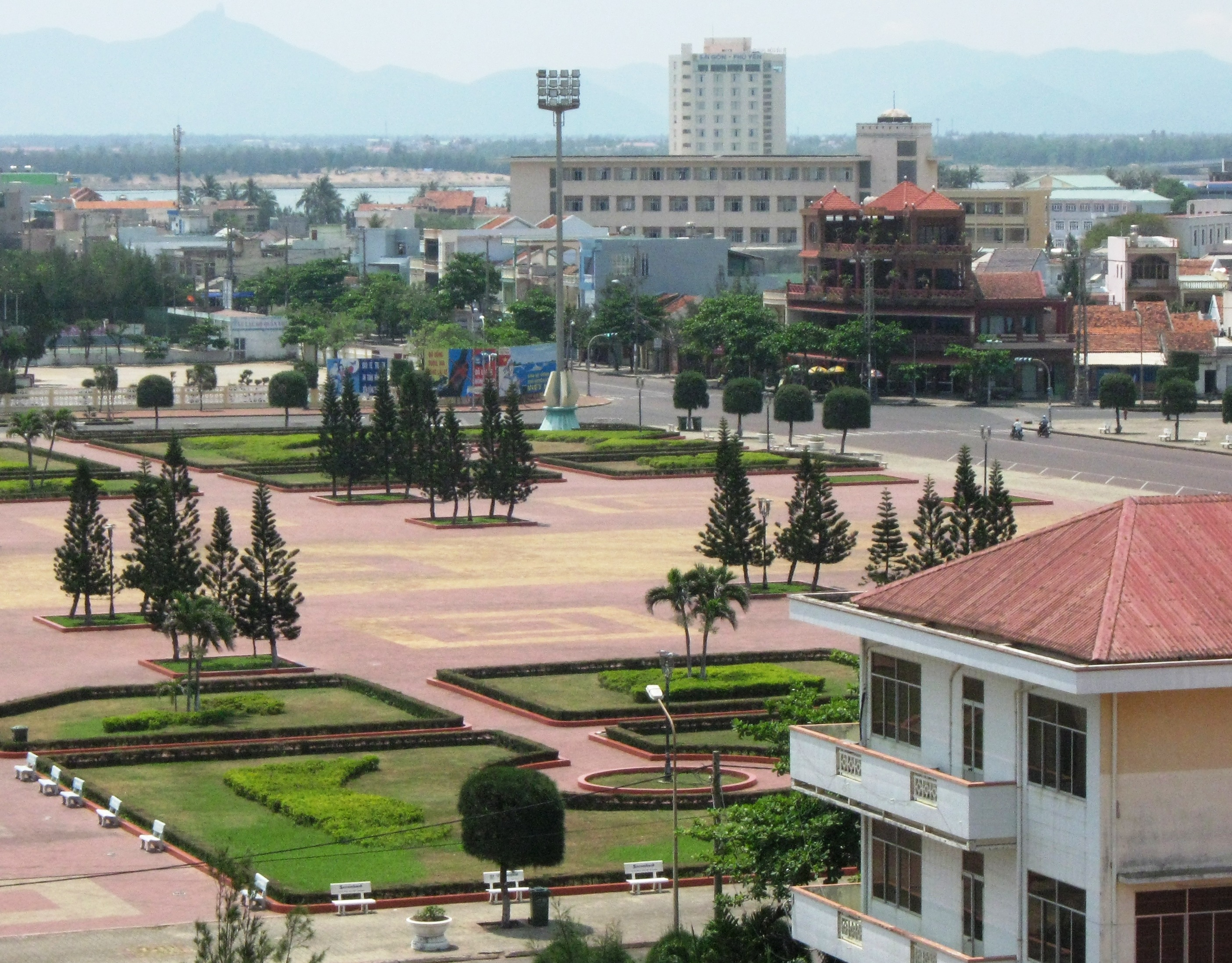
In Tuy Hòa, teams checked into the Pit Stop at April 1st Square after racing across Phú Yên Province.

Airdate: 10 August 2019

- An Chấn, Phú Yên Province (Xép Beach) (Pit Start)
  - An Lĩnh (Vực Hồm Waterfall and Vực Song Waterfall)
- An Ninh Đông (Ganh Da Dia Beach)
- Tuy An (Ancient Well)
- Tuy Hòa (April 1 Square)

In this season's only Fast Forward, one team had to travel 40 kilometres (25 mi) to Vực Hồm Waterfall. There, they had to search the waters for clue with a key that would unlock a box containing a smartphone, which provided teams a map to hike to Vực Song Waterfall. There, teams had to find a submerged box, inside of which was another box that contained the Fast Forward award.

In this leg's Roadblock, one team member would have swim rings placed around them (five for men & four for women) that would constrict movement and had to walk to an Amazing Race flag placed at the other end of the beach. Then, they had to flip a tire until they returned to the starting point to receive their next clue.

This leg's Detour was a choice between Chìm (Sink) or Nổi (Float). For both Detour options, teams had to travel by personal watercraft to Ganh Da Dia Beach. In Sink, teams had to scuba dive and search for a Tower of Hanoi puzzle. Teams would only have five minutes per dive to find and memorize the puzzle. Once ashore, teams had to recreate the puzzle and then solve it so that all the discs were on one peg by moving one disc at a time and placing smaller discs atop larger discs to receive their next clue. In Float, both team members would be towed behind a boat while on a wakeboard and had to stand on the board for ten seconds to receive their next clue.

Additional tasks

- At the start of the leg, team had to hike along the rocks of Xép Beach to retrieve a clue, which instructed teams to continue hiking to the beach for their next clue.
- At the entrance to the Ancient Well, one team member would be blindfolded and holding a smartphone. This phone would provide a video feed for the non-blindfolded team member so they could guide their partner to the well. There, the team member had to use a leaky bucket to draw water from the well and bring the water back to the start to receive their next clue.

=== Leg 7 (Phú Yên → Lâm Đồng) ===
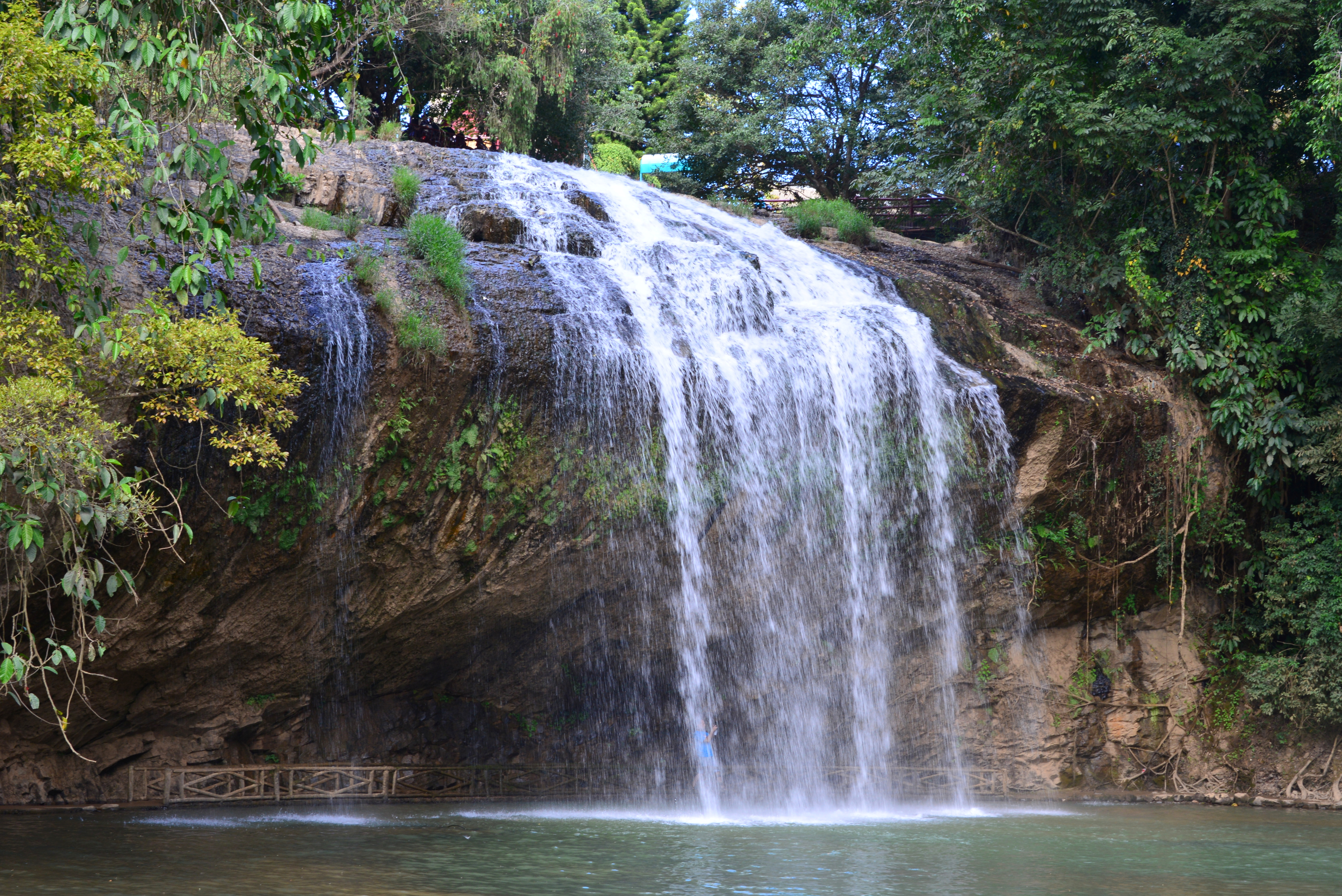
While racing through Da Lat, teams encountered a Detour at Prenn Waterfall.

Airdate: 17 August 2019

- Da Lat, Lâm Đồng Province (Da Lat Flower Gardens) (Pit Start)
- Da Lat (Datanla High Rope Course (in Vietnamese))
- Da Lat (Prenn Waterfall (in Vietnamese))
- Da Lat (Cà Phê Ngoại Ô)
- Da Lat (Đường Hầm Hỏa Xa)
- Da Lat (Dalat Hasfarm) (Unaired)
- Da Lat (Lâm Viên Square (in Vietnamese))

In this leg's Roadblock, one team member had to climb five obstacles on the Datanla High Rope Course and collect two eggs at the end of each. If team members had eight intact eggs by the end of the course, they would receive their next clue.

This leg's Detour was a choice between Ném (Throw) or Sút (Shot). In Throw, one team member had five-minutes to ride an ostrich and toss rings onto cones to receive their next clue, otherwise they had to wait out a fifteen-minute penalty. In Shot, one team member had to kick three balls with their partner on their back through a hole in a goal to receive their next clue. If after six shots, teams did not get three goals, they had to wait out a fifteen-minute penalty.

Additional tasks

- At Đường Hầm Hỏa Xa, teams had to enter a pitch black tunnel with their legs tied together like a three-legged race and correctly describe the seven animals they encountered, an eel, a duck, a rabbit, a pig, a snake, frogs, and mice, to receive their clue.
- At Dalat Hasfarm, teams had to sell 50 flowers to at least 10 people at 3,000₫ apiece to receive their next clue. This task went unaired in the episode.

=== Leg 8 (Lâm Đồng → Ho Chi Minh City) ===
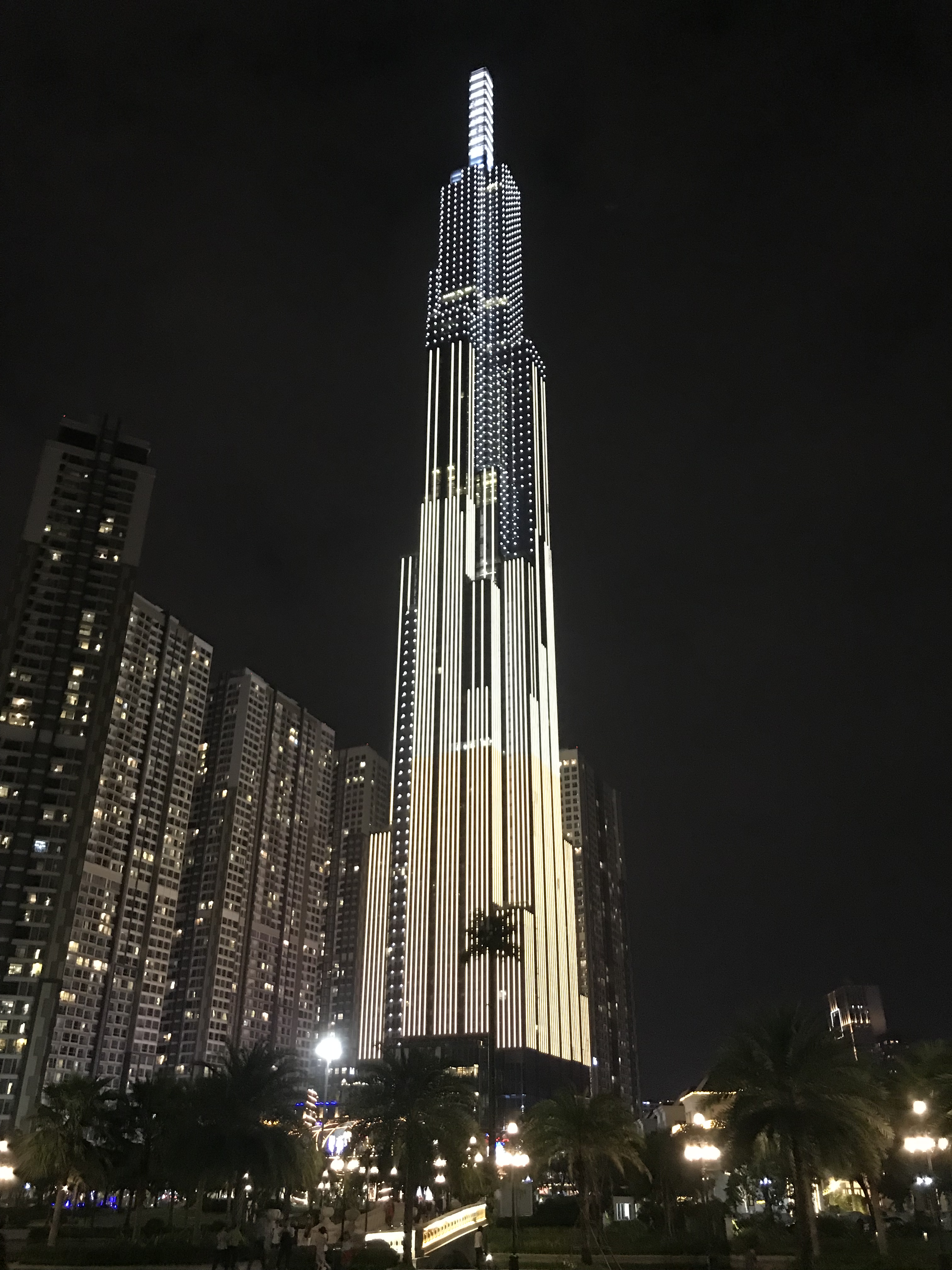
In Ho Chi Minh City, teams encountered a Roadblock at Landmark 81, the tallest building in Vietnam and Southeast Asia.

Airdate: 24 August 2019

- Ho Chi Minh City (Landmark 81) (Pit Start)
- Ho Chi Minh City (Bitexco Financial Tower – BHD Star Cineplex)
- Ho Chi Minh City (Nhà Hàng Tiệc Cưới Như Ý)
- Ho Chi Minh City (April 30 Park)
- Ho Chi Minh City (AB Tower – 26th Floor)

In this leg's Roadblock, one team member had to ride a window washer platform 10 stories down from the top of Landmark 81 to a window with the distances between the destinations they visited so far as well as the distances from London and Paris to Ho Chi Minh City. If they could successfully reiterate the distances, they would receive their next clue.

This season's final Detour was a choice between Trang Điểm (Makeup) or Biểu Diễn (Performances). In Makeup, each team member had to apply makeup and dress as a hát tuồng character to receive their next clue. In Performances, teams had to learn and perform music for a hát tuồng performance to receive their next clue.

Additional tasks

- At BHD Star Cineplex, teams had to watch a silent scene from Battle of the Brides, which starred previous Amazing Race Vietnam host Huy Khánh, and come up with dialogue that they had to perform in sync with the video to receive their next clue from director Nguyễn Quang Dũng.
- At April 30 Park, teams would be wearing costumes, which they changed into after completing the Detour, that obscured their faces so fans wouldn't recognize them. Without talking, teams had to convince passersby to take photographs with them at 20,000₫ per picture. Once teams took ten photographs, they would receive their next clue.

=== Leg 9 (Ho Chi Minh City → China → North Korea) ===
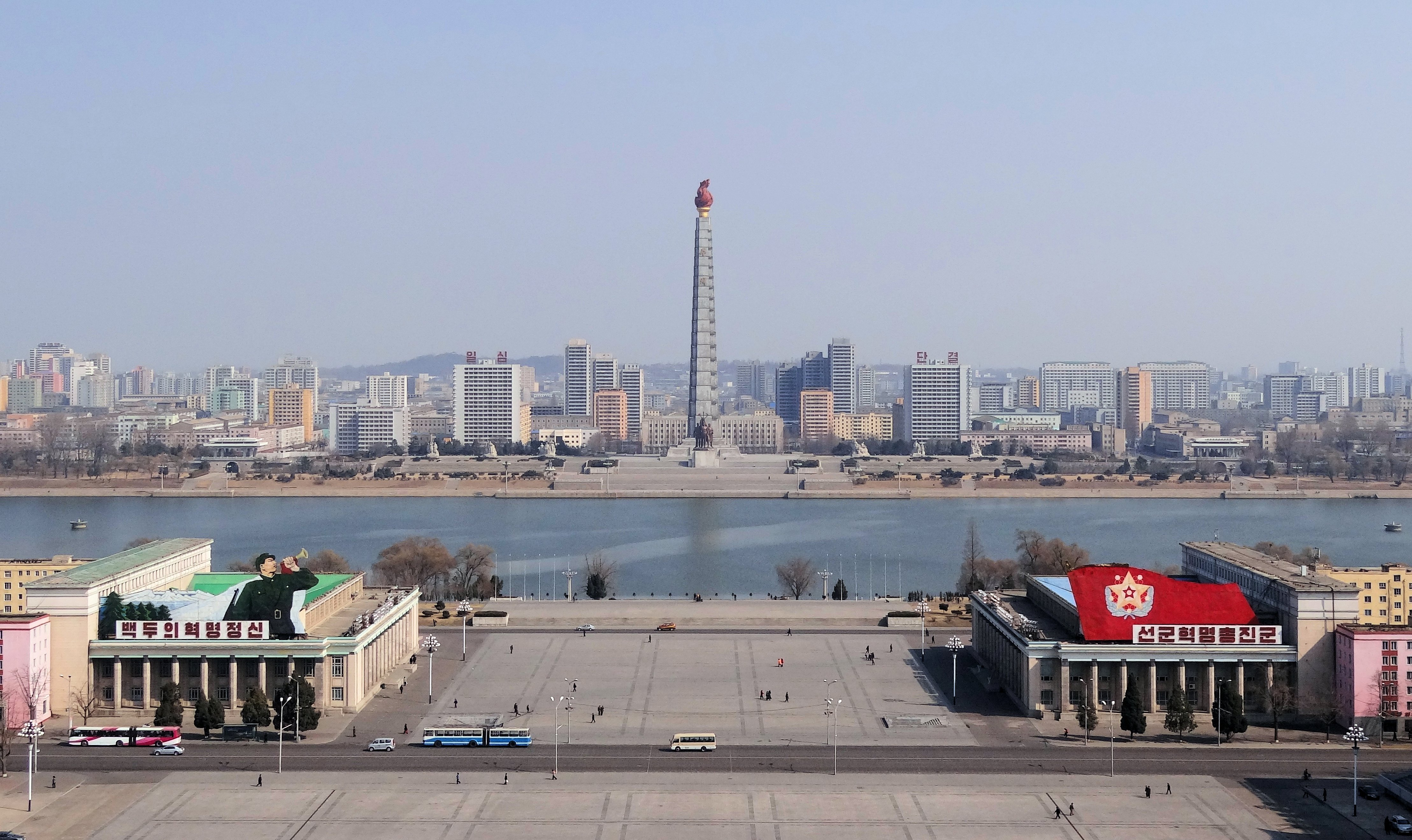
Kim Il Sung Square on the banks of the Taedong River in Pyongyang hosted the penultimate Pit Stop.

Airdate: 31 August 2019

- Ho Chi Minh City (Vinpearl Luxury Landmark 81) (Pit Start)
- Ho Chi Minh City (Tan Son Nhat International Airport) to Beijing, China (Beijing Capital International Airport)
- Beijing (Beijing Capital International Airport – Terminal 3)
- Beijing (Beijing Capital International Airport) to Pyongyang, North Korea (Pyongyang International Airport)
- Pyongyang (Pyongyang International Airport to Mansu Hill Grand Monument)
- Pyongyang (Korea Stamp Museum)
- Pyongyang (Taesongsan Park – South Gate of Taesong Fortress)
- Pyongyang (Taedongmun)
- Pyongyang (Taedong River – Floating Restaurant Taedonggang) (Unaired)
- Pyongyang (Kim Il Sung Square overlooking Juche Tower)

Additional tasks

- At 1:00 a.m., teams were woken up at the Pit Stop hotel, Vinpearl Luxury Landmark 81, and were informed that the leg had begun with them having to go to Tan Son Nhat International Airport. There, teams were instructed to fly to Beijing, where they were given a clue informing them that they would be traveling to Pyongyang, North Korea before being given their plane tickets and their travel visas.
- After arriving in North Korea, men had to change into suits and women had to don áo dàis before boarding a bus to Mansu Hill Grand Monument, where teams had to place flowers beneath the statues of Kim Il Sung and Kim Jong Il and bow to receive next their clue.
- At the Korea Stamp Museum, teams had to search a gallery with over 6,000 postage stamps for a commemorative stamp of Kim Jong Un's goodwill visit in Vietnam after the 2019 North Korea–United States Hanoi Summit as shown to them by host Song Luân to receive their next clue. (Note: For safety reasons, teams were told that they could not point at or comment on any stamps that depicted the Kim family.)
- At the South Gate of Taesong Fortress, teams had two hours to learn and perform traditional pungmul dances with women learning the Tondollari dance and men learning the Sangmo dance to receive their next clue.
- At Taedongmun, one team member had to memorize two verses of a Goryeo-era poem describing the beauty of the Taedong River written in Hangul and had to describe the script to their partner so they could recreate the text on a scroll using a calligraphy brush to receive their next clue. Teams only had one attempt and had to serve a five-minute penalty for each incorrectly written word on the scroll.
- At the Floating Restaurant Taedonggang moored near Kim Il Sung Square, teams had to taste eight locally crafted beers. They would then be given the same beers one at a time and had to correctly identify them to receive their next clue. Teams would receive a five-minute penalty for each incorrect guess. The task went unaired in the episode but was later posted online.

=== Leg 10 (North Korea → Ho Chi Minh City → Kiên Giang) ===
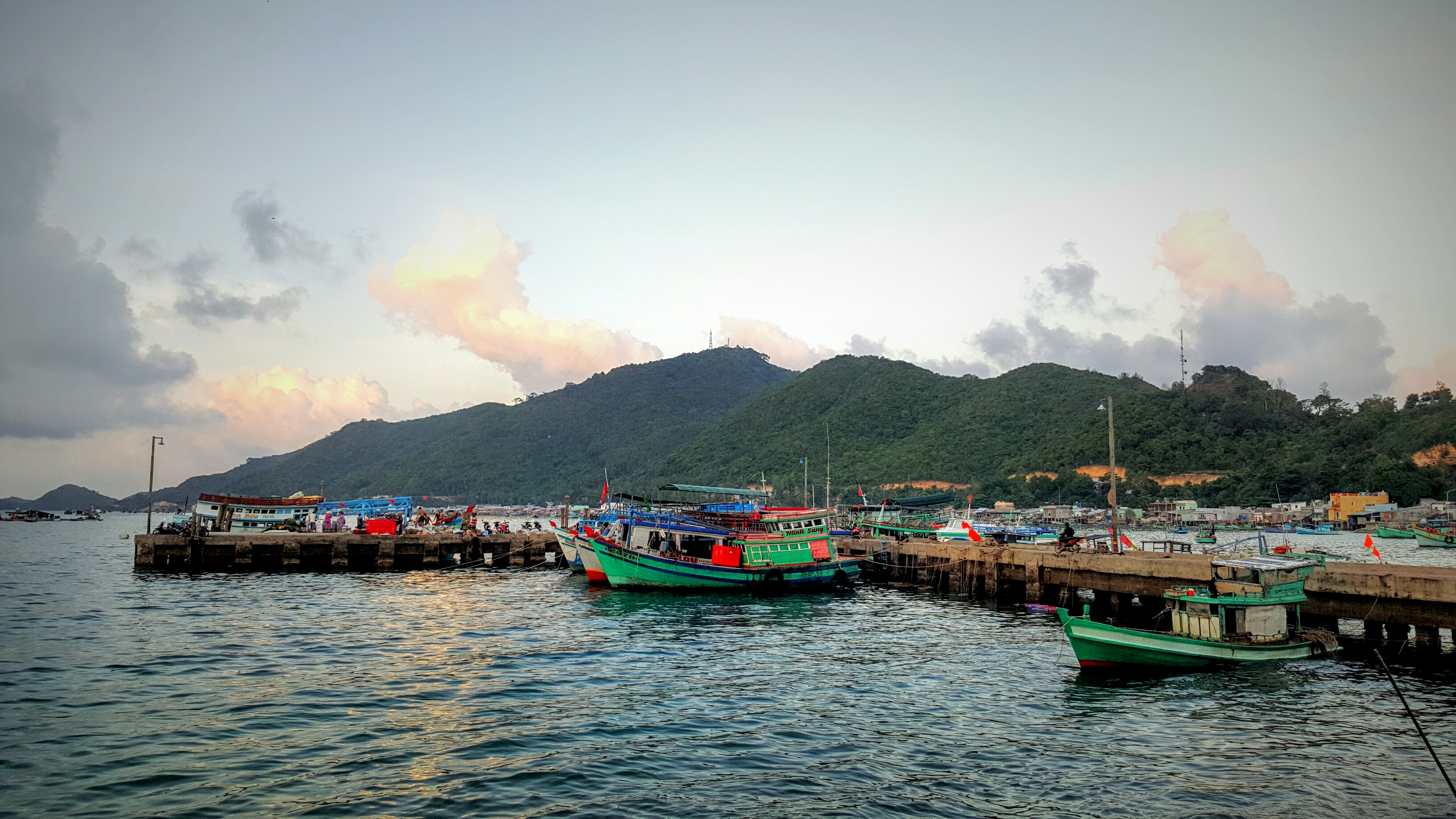
The Nam Du Archipelago in the Gulf of Thailand was visited during the final leg of The Amazing Race Vietnam 2019.

Airdate: 7 September 2019

- Pyongyang (Pyongyang International Airport) to Ho Chi Minh City, Vietnam (Tan Son Nhat International Airport)
- Rạch Giá, Kiên Giang Province (Rạch Giá Harbour) (Pit Start)
- Rạch Giá (Rạch Giá Ferry Terminal) to An Sơn, Nam Du Island (Nam Du Wharf)
- An Sơn (Nam Du Wharf) to Bờ Đập Island
- Mấu Island
- An Sơn (Nam Du Wharf) to Rạch Giá (Rạch Giá Ferry Terminal)
- Rạch Giá (Trần Quang Khải Square)
- Rạch Giá (Phú Cường Land – Pool)
- Rạch Giá (Phú Cường Land – Ferris Wheel)
- Rạch Giá (Shophouse Phú Cường)

In this season's final Roadblock, one team member had 15 minutes to climb 12 stories up a climbing wall to the top of a floodlight, where they to jump off and grab a bottle of Sting Energy Drink to receive their next clue.

Additional tasks

- After arriving on Nam Du Island, teams had to board a marked boat that would take them to Bờ Đập Island, where they had to assemble a raft using the provided materials that they had to use to deliver coconuts to an island two kilometres (1.2 mi) away to receive their next clue.
- After delivering the coconuts, teams had five minutes to solve three brain teasers to receive their next clue. Teams had to find the solution to the equation 29 – 1 = 30 without moving the numbers (by turning the equation into Roman numerals: XXIX – I = XXX), change an arrangement of sticks that formed two triangles into three by moving two sticks, and determine the numerical position of a car in a parking lot with the sequence 16, 06, 68, 88, ??, 98 (L8, flipping the sequence upside-down is 86, 87, 88, 89, 90, 91 and 87 flipped is L8).
- At the pool in Phú Cường Land, teams had to use balloons to lift a chest with their next clue out of the water.
- For the final task, teams could find a ring of boards that depicted the locations from the previous legs surrounding a fountain by the park's Ferris wheel. Teams first had to answer questions about Legs 1, 3, 4, 5, 6, and 9 and serve a five-minute penalty per incorrect answer. Teams could then choose another question from a board they answered incorrectly or replace a question with another location. Once teams answered six questions correctly, the Ferris wheel would rotate revealing their final clue. The questions included:

Leg	Question	Answer	
1	The first Pit Stop at the Hmong Royal Palace was located at which district in Hà Giang province?	A	Đồng Văn
4	Which task did you not perform in Quảng Bình?	A	Big Draw
5	On which river was the challenge in which you rowed a canoe?	B	Đăk Bla River
6	In the challenge of finding an ancient well in Phu Yen, in which commune was the old well?	C	Phú Thạnh
9	What is the place where Kim Il Sung was born and raised?	B	Mangyongdae

== Reception ==
=== Controversy ===
During Leg 6, one task involved teams scuba diving to find a concrete slab puzzle placed on top of a coral reef. Viewers along with The Amazing Race Vietnam 2015 winner and diving coach Ngọc Anh complaining that the task was damaging to a fragile ecosystem. The producers of the show later issued an apology stating that the original intention of the task was for teams to swim through the reef to a strip of sand (murky water conditions near the sand strip also forced them to move the puzzle to the reef in order to see the puzzle clearly), where they would find the puzzle, and assured viewers that a similar setup would not occur in the future.

== Details ==
- List of broadcasts of Vietnam Television (VTV)
