= Nam Anh =

Vietnamese model

Nguyễn Thị Lệ Nam
- Born: Nguyễn Thị Lệ Nam; January 15, 1996 (age 30); Tiền Giang, Vietnam
- Height: 1.74 m (5 ft 9 in)
- Beauty pageant titleholder
- Title: Miss Cosmo Hồ Chí Minh City 2026
- Hair color: Dark Brown
- Eye color: Dark Brown
- Major competitions: Miss Universe Vietnam 2022 (Top 16); Miss Universe Vietnam 2023 (Top 10); Miss Grand Vietnam 2024 (Top 15); Miss Cosmo Hồ Chí Minh City 2026 (Winner); Miss Cosmo Vietnam 2027 (TBA)

Nguyễn Thị Lệ Nam (born January 15, 1996) is a Vietnamese actress, model and beauty pageant titleholder who was crowned Miss Cosmo Hồ Chí Minh City 2026. She was the winner of the Vietnam Fashion Model 2018. She will represent Ho Chi Minh City at Miss Cosmo Vietnam 2027.

== Early life ==
Lệ Nam also known as Nam Anh, was born on January 15, 1996, in Tiền Giang, Vietnam. She is the twin sister of Miss Earth Vietnam 2016 - Nguyễn Thị Lệ Nam Em. She studied Cultural Management at the Military University of Culture and Arts.

She won the Vietnam Fashion Model 2018 competition and made it to the Top 9 of The Face Vietnam 2018.

She is working on a community project called Send Our Love - a charitable program she has maintained since 2022 with the desire to support women, children, and those in difficult circumstances throughout Vietnam.

== Pageant ==
=== Miss Universe Vietnam 2022 ===
She participated in a national beauty pageant for the first time and made it to the Top 16, winning the Best Face award and the Community Ambassador award.

=== Miss Universe Vietnam 2023 ===
She returned to Miss Universe Vietnam 2023 and made it to the Top 10 in the finals also winning the Miss Social Media Award.

=== Miss Grand Vietnam 2024 ===
She achieved a Top 15 finish at Miss Grand Vietnam 2024, along with other awards including Top 5 Best in Swimsuit and Top 18 Miss Elasten.

=== Miss Cosmo Hồ Chí Minh City 2026 ===
On June 19, she became the first winner of the Miss Cosmo Ho Chi Minh City 2026 competition and will represent Hồ Chí Minh City at Miss Cosmo Vietnam 2027.

Awards and achievements
Preceded by None	Miss Cosmo Hồ Chí Minh City; 2026	Succeeded by Incumbent
Preceded by Nguyễn Thị Trúc Anh	Winner Vietnam Fashion Model; 2018	Succeeded by Trương Thúy Vy
