= H'Hen Niê =

Miss Universe Vietnam 2018

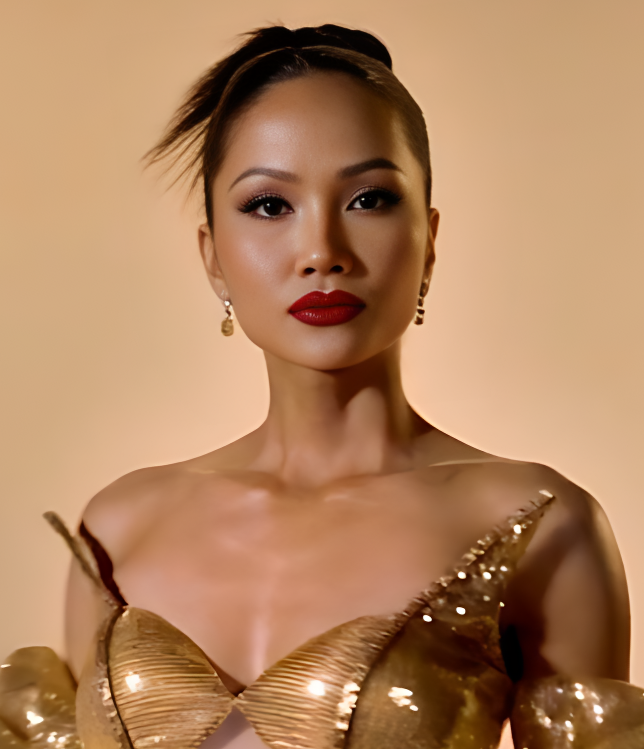
- H'Hen Niê in 2023
- Born: 15 May 1992 (age 34); Cư M'gar, Đắk Lắk, Vietnam
- Education: College of Foreign Economic Relations, Ho Chi Minh City
- Beauty pageant titleholder
- Title: Miss Universe Vietnam 2017
- Major competitions: Miss Universe Vietnam 2017; (Winner); Miss Universe 2018; (Top 5)

H'Hen Niê (born 15 May 1992) is a Vietnamese model and beauty pageant titleholder. She is an ethnic Rade. After winning Miss Universe Vietnam 2017, she represented Vietnam at Miss Universe 2018, and reached in the Top 5 finalist.

== Early life ==
H'Hen Niê was born in Cư M’gar, Đắk Lắk Province to parents Y'Krin Êban and H'Ngơn Niê. She comes from the Rade ethnic minority, and she speaks the Rade language as her native language. H'Hen did not learn Vietnamese until eighth grade.

After graduating from high school, H'Hen studied for a year at Nha Trang National Ethnic Community College before moving to Ho Chi Minh City to study corporate finance at the College of Foreign Economic Relations. She worked as a domestic worker for a year to pay her bills while she was in college. While H'Hen worked as an intern at a bank, she began to consider a career in modelling.

== Career ==
=== Pageantry ===
==== Miss Universe Vietnam 2017 ====
H'Hen competed in and won Miss Universe Vietnam 2017. As a Rade person, H'Hen is the first and only Miss Universe Vietnam titleholder to be from an ethnic minority group, other than Kinh.

==== Miss Universe 2018 ====
She represented Vietnam at Miss Universe 2018 in Bangkok, Thailand. In the months leading up to the pageant, H'Hen's training and preparation was documented and aired as a YouTube series called Road to Miss Universe 2018.

The Miss Universe Vietnam Organization held a contest to find the Vietnamese national costume that H'Hen would wear for the national costume competition at the pageant. Six designs made it to the final round. After a nationwide vote, the top three designs were selected: Bánh Mì (inspired by the Vietnamese sandwich bánh mì), Phố cổ (inspired by the ancient town of Hội An), and Ngũ hổ (inspired by the classical Hàng Trống painting and Vietnamese opera). In the end, Bánh Mì was selected to be Vietnam's national costume at Miss Universe 2018.

In the finale held at Impact Arena on December 17 in Bangkok, H'Hen finished as a top five finalist. In her top five interview, H'Hen received a question about whether the #MeToo movement has gone too far, for which she answered:

To me, it has not gone too far. Because protecting people’s well-being against sexual abuse, protecting women, that is a precious right. All of us need protection, our lives need freedom as well as protection.

=== Post Miss Universe ===
H'Hen won the 2018 Timeless Beauty Award by Missosology, a beauty pageant blog and magazine.

H'Hen's modelling career took off after she won Miss Universe Vietnam 2017. She became an ambassador for various brands and appeared on multiple magazine covers and in editorial features. She participated in fashion shows in Vietnam and overseas.

In July 2019, she joined Lệ Hằng, Vietnam's representative at Miss Universe 2016, to compete in season 6 of The Amazing Race Vietnam as the Yellow Team. The team won the race and received a cash prize of 300 million VND (approximately 13,000 USD). They committed to using the prize for charity work. She was the host of I Am Miss Universe Vietnam 2019, which premiered in October 2019, but left due to health issues.

== Philanthropy ==
H'Hen believes in the efforts of education being key for rising out of poverty. She initially committed to donate 70% of her prizes if she won Miss Universe Vietnam. Instead, she gave away all of her prize money worth $10,000 to provide scholarships for students at her old schools. As Miss Universe Vietnam, H'Hen rallied for support for the unfortunate, the elderly as well as HIV/AIDS victims. She became a global ambassador for Room to Read in 2018, a non-profit organization focusing on providing resources for girls' education and literacy programs. As global ambassador, she has raised approximately $20,000 for a project to build a new library in Lam Dong and to provide scholarships for girls in Asia and Africa so that they could complete secondary education school and develop key life skills. The library was opened in October 2018, housing over 3500 titles for students at Bao Thuan Elementary School, and the local community to use. She received "Star for the Community" award at Star of the Year 2018 gala for her charity work in Vietnam.

In February 2019, she spoke to 12,000 students at a conference organized by the Francis Padua Papica Foundation in Naga, Camarines Sur, Philippines where she shared her stories and affirmed her stance on believing in oneself to overcome one's challenges. A month later, H'Hen initiated a project that would provide clean water and street lights to people in her village. Hoping to complete the project before she ended her reign as Miss Universe Vietnam in late 2019.

== TV shows ==
Year	Program Name	Role	In	Broadcast	Along with
2015	Vietnam's Next Top Model	Contestants	Episodes 1-8	VTV3	
2017	Miss Universe Vietnam	Contestants	All	VTV1; VTV6; VTV9	
2018	Miss Universe	Contestants	All	AXN tv	
2019	The Generation Show Vietnam	Guest	Episode 6	VTV3	
2019	You Deserve It	Player		VTV3	
2019	The Amazing Race Vietnam	Player	All	VTV3	Đặng Thị Lê Hàng
2019	Miss Universe Vietnam	Host (Semifinals)	All	VTV9	
2020	Go to Vietnam	Guest	Episode 1	VTV9	
2021	The Next Face Vietnam (Season 1)	Coach; Judge	All	TBA	Nguyễn Thùy Dương; Lương Thùy Linh
2022	Miss Universe Vietnam	Judge	All	VTV3; VTV9	
2022	Weekend Date (Season 2)	Guest	Episode 2 (July 9)	VTV3	S.T Son Thach
2022	2 ngày, 1 đêm	Guest	Episode 6	HTV7	
2023	Top Chef Vietnam	Judges	All	VTV3	Alain Nguyễn, Luke Nguyễn, Valentin Trần, Miss Ngọc Châu
2023	Miss Universe Vietnam	Judges and Media Ambassadors	All	VTV3	Khanh Van
2023	Chị đẹp đạp gió rẽ sóng	Contestants		VTV3	
2024	Vietnamese Family Home	Guests	Episode 92	HTV7	Doan Quoc Dam
2024	Anh trai vượt ngàn chông gai	Judges for the Culinary Competition	Episode 7	VTV3	Diệp Lâm Anh, Khánh Vy

Awards and achievements
Preceded by (Thailand) Maria Ehren (Venezuela) Keysi Sayago	Miss Universe Top 5 Finalist (with (Puerto Rico) Kiara Ortega); 2018	Succeeded by (Colombia) Gabriela Tafur (Thailand) Paweensuda Drouin
Preceded by (South Africa) Demi-Leigh Nel-Peters	Timeless Beauty by Missosology; 2018	Succeeded by (Uganda) Evelyn Namatovu
Preceded by Nguyễn Thị Loan	Miss Universe Vietnam; 2018	Succeeded by Hoàng Thị Thùy
Preceded by Phạm Thị Hương	Miss Cosmo Vietnam; 2017	Succeeded by Nguyễn Trần Khánh Vân
