= Bùi Quỳnh Hoa =

Vietnamese model and beauty pageant titleholder (born 1998)

- Born: 8 July 1998 (age 28); Hanoi, Vietnam
- Height: 1.75 m (5 ft 9 in)
- Beauty pageant titleholder
- Title: Miss Ao dai Vietnam World 2017; Supermodel Vietnam 2018; Supermodel International 2022; Miss Universe Vietnam 2023
- Major competitions: Miss Aodai Vietnam World 2017 (Winner); Miss Universe Vietnam 2017 (Unplaced); Miss Universe Vietnam 2022 (Top 10; Miss Universe Vietnam 2023 (Winner); Miss Universe 2023 (Unplaced)

Bùi Quỳnh Hoa (born 8 July 1998) is a Vietnamese beauty pageant titleholder who was crowned Miss Universe Vietnam 2023. She represented Vietnam in Miss Universe 2023 held in El Salvador. She won the title Supermodel International 2022.

Awards and achievements
Preceded by (Estonia) Elina Pronina	Supermodel International; 2022	Succeeded by (Dominican Republic) Emely Encarnación
Preceded by Nguyễn Thị Ngọc Châu	Miss Universe Vietnam; 2023	Succeeded by Nguyễn Cao Kỳ Duyên
