= Miss Universe Vietnam 2022 =

5th Miss Universe Vietnam pageant

- Date: June 25, 2022
- Presenters: Đức Bảo; Thanh Huyền
- Entertainment: Đông Nhi; Hồ Ngọc Hà; Da Lab; Lân Nhã
- Venue: Saigon Exhibition and Convention Center, District 7, Ho Chi Minh City, Vietnam
- Broadcaster: VTV3
- Entrants: 71
- Placements: 16
- Winner: Nguyễn Thị Ngọc Châu; Tây Ninh
- Congeniality: Hoàng Như Mỹ; Lâm Đồng
- Best National Costume: Nguyễn Võ Ngọc Anh; Hồ Chí Minh City
- Photogenic: Vũ Thúy Quỳnh; Điện Biên

Miss Universe Vietnam 2022 was the fifth Miss Universe Vietnam pageant, held at Saigon Exhibition and Convention Center, District 7 in Ho Chi Minh City, Vietnam, on June 25, 2022. This was also the last Miss Universe Vietnam competition held by Công ty Cổ phần Hoàn vũ Sài Gòn (Unicorp) under the name Hoa hậu Hoàn vũ Việt Nam, before being granted to a new national license holder the following year.

Nguyễn Thị Ngọc Châu was crowned as the winner by her predecessor Nguyễn Trần Khánh Vân and represented Vietnam at Miss Universe 2021, who placed in top 21

== Results ==
=== Placements ===
Color keys

- Declared as the winner in an International pageant.
- Ended as Runner-up in an International pageant.
- Ended as finalist or semifinalist in an International pageant.
- Unplaced.

Placement	Contestant	International pagent	International placement
Miss Universe Vietnam 2022	Nguyễn Thị Ngọc Châu	Miss Universe 2022	Unplaced
1st Runner-Up	Lê Thảo Nhi		
2nd Runner-Up	Huỳnh Phạm Thủy Tiên		
Top 5	Lê Hoàng Phương; Nguyễn Thị Hương Ly		
Top 10	Bùi Quỳnh Hoa; Đặng Thu Huyền; Nguyễn Thị Thanh Khoa; Ngô Bảo Ngọc; Vũ Thúy Quỳnh		
Top 16	Bùi Lý Thiên Hương; Nguyễn Thị Lệ Nam; Trần Tuyết Như; Hoàng Thị Nhung; Nguyễn Thị Oanh; Phạm Hoàng Thu Uyên §		

§ – Voted into Top 16 by viewers.

=== Special awards ===
Award	Contestant
Best in National Costume	Nguyễn Võ Ngọc Anh
Best Introduction	Nguyễn Thị Hương Ly
Best Face	Nguyễn Thị Lệ Nam
Best Catwalk	Lê Hoàng Phương
Best Interview	Nguyễn Thị Thanh Khoa
Best English Skill	Lê Thảo Nhi
People's Choice	Phạm Hoàng Thu Uyên
Miss Congeniality	Hoàng Như Mỹ
Miss Talent	Bùi Thị Thanh Thủy
Miss Ao Dai	Đặng Hoàng Tâm Như
Miss Beach	Ngô Bảo Ngọc
Miss Photogenic	Vũ Thúy Quỳnh
Miss Sport	Nguyễn Thị Oanh
Miss Media	Bùi Thị Linh Chi
Miss Bravery	Nguyễn Thị Phương Thảo
Miss Fashion	Nguyễn Thị Hương Ly
Miss TikTok	Nguyễn Thị Hương Ly

== Format ==
In 2022, Miss Universe Vietnam announced the change of some parts of the format, including:

- The number of contestants participating in the final round is only 40 instead of 45 as in previous years.
- The age limit of contestants is raised from 26 years old to 28 years old.
- There will be the Top 16 instead of 15 as in previous years (one contestant will be added based on audience votes)
- There will be a national costume contest accompanied to the MUVN season to find out the best national costume to be the winner's fellow-traveller at Miss Universe 2022
- An unprecedented event, each judge will have a "golden ticket", which can be given to any contestants making a good impression on our tough judges, and that lucky girl will have a special privilege to directly enter the Top 71 semifinals.
- After each broadcast of the program 'I am Miss Universe Vietnam 2022', 5 contestants will be eliminated (except for episode 2, only 3 contestants will be eliminated) and 33 contestants will enter directly. At the press conference of Top 40 contestants, 7 "silver tickets" will be awarded to the contestants who were eliminated in the Top 71 semifinals.

In an unprecedented move, contestant Đỗ Nhật Hà was awarded an honorary "golden ticket" and entered the Top 71 semifinals, becoming the first openly transgender woman to compete in Miss Universe Vietnam.

== Contestants ==
=== Top 41 final round ===
Name of contestants	Age	No	Height	Hometown	Placements	Notes
Ngô Bảo Ngọc	27	113	1,74 m	Ho Chi Minh City	Top 10	
Hoàng Thị Nhung	26	114	1,79 m	Hanoi	Top 16	
Lê Thị Kiều Nhung	24	116	1,81 m	Trà Vinh		
Bùi Thị Thanh Thủy	25	119	1,68 m	Phú Yên		
Vũ Mỹ Ngân	23	136	1,81 m	Quảng Ninh		
Nguyễn Thị Thu Hiền	27	141	1,70 m	Đắk Lắk		
Nguyễn Thị Hồng Ngọc	24	148	1,67 m	Hải Dương		
Nguyễn Anh Khuê	20	200	1,75 m	Hanoi		
Đặng Thu Huyền	20	202	1,76 m	Hanoi	Top 10	
Phạm Diệu Linh	24	208	1,68 m	Vĩnh Phúc		
Nguyễn Thị Quỳnh Anh	26	203	1,68 m	Thái Bình		
Lê Phan Hạnh Nguyên	25	209	1,72 m	Đồng Tháp		
Bùi Quỳnh Hoa	24	224	1,75 m	Hanoi	Top 10	
Cao Thị Ngọc Bích	23	233	1,75 m	Hưng Yên		
Đinh Y Quyên	25	238	1,72 m	Gia Lai		
Nguyễn Võ Ngọc Anh	19	239	1,70 m	Ho Chi Minh City		
Huỳnh Phạm Thủy Tiên	24	245	1,72 m	Đồng Tháp	2nd Runner-Up	
Bùi Thị Linh Chi	26	248	1,69 m	Hanoi		
Đỗ Trịnh Quỳnh Như	25	305	1,74 m	Ho Chi Minh City		
Nguyễn Thị Thanh Khoa	28	307	1,77 m	Ho Chi Minh City	Top 10	
Lý Tú Chi	23	308	1,70 m	Bình Phước		
Lê Thảo Nhi	28	311	1,68m	Ulm, Germany	1st Runner-Up	
Nguyễn Thị Ngọc Châu	27	314	1,74 m	Tây Ninh	Miss Universe Vietnam 2022	
Bùi Lý Thiên Hương	26	315	1,73 m	An Giang	Top 16	
Lê Hoàng Phương	27	316	1,76 m	Khánh Hòa	Top 5	
Hoàng Như Mỹ	25	320	1,65 m	Lâm Đồng		
Lê Thị Tường Vy	21	323	1,76 m	Quảng Ngãi		
Đỗ Nhật Hà	26	325	1,75 m	Ho Chi Minh City		
Đặng Hoàng Tâm Như	23	326	1,75 m	Thừa Thiên Huế		
Trần Tuyết Như	27	328	1,70 m	Thái Bình	Top 16	
Vũ Quỳnh Trang	25	333	1,71 m	Nam Định		
Trần Đình Thạch Thảo	25	334	1,75 m	Bình Thuận		
Nguyễn Thị Lệ Nam	26	337	1,75 m	Tiền Giang	Top 16	
Nguyễn Thị Hương Ly	27	343	1,76 m	Gia Lai	Top 5	
Nguyễn Thị Oanh	26	345	1,83 m	Quảng Ninh	Top 16	
Phạm Hoàng Thu Uyên	25	601	1,66 m	Haiphong	Top 16	
Vũ Thúy Quỳnh	24	606	1,74 m	Điện Biên	Top 10	
Nguyễn Thị Phương Thảo	25	686	1,70 m	Hanoi		
Phan Ngọc Ngân	27	770	1,67 m	Tây Ninh		
Lê Thu Hòa	24	819	1,72 m	Ninh Bình		
Trần Minh Quyên	28	822	1,70 m	Hanoi		

=== Top 71 preliminary ===
Name	Age	No	Height	Hometown	Eliminated	Notes
Nguyễn Thanh Thanh	23	118	1,70 m	Tiền Giang	Episode 2	
Lê Ngọc Phuơng Thảo	27	125	1,75 m	Bến Tre	Episode 2	
Hoàng Thị Hải Hà	22	101	1,70 m	Nam Định	Episode 3	
Phạm Thị Kim Vui	23	117	1,72 m	Đồng Nai	Episode 3	
Nguyễn Thị Ngọc Tuyết	27	145	1,75 m	Nam Định	Episode 3	
Huỳnh Minh Thiên Hương	26	243	1,69 m	Quảng Ngãi	Episode 3	
Nguyễn Thu Hằng	24	859	1,67 m	Bắc Ninh	Episode 3	
Hoàng Thị Thanh Dược	18	104	1,73 m	Nam Định	Episode 4	
Phạm Thị Minh Huệ	23	242	1,80 m	Hải Dương	Episode 4	
Trần Hoàng Yến	26	130	1,68 m	Quảng Ninh	Episode 5	
Nguyễn Trương Ánh Hồng	24	820	1,75 m	Tây Ninh	Episode 5	
Bùi Thùy Nhiên	20	140	1,73 m	Vĩnh Long	Episode 6	
Lê Thùy Linh	23	201	1,71 m	Thái Bình	Episode 6	
Lưu Phương Anh	20	525	1,77 m	Hanoi	Episode 6	
Nguyễn Đình Khánh Phương	27	773	1,69 m	Khánh Hòa	Episode 6	
Hồ Nguyễn Quỳnh Anh	24	137	1,75 m	Hanoi	Episode 7	
Huỳnh Đào Diễm Trinh	24	237	1,75 m	Long An	Episode 7	
Lê Thị Trúc Đào	28	310	1,73 m	Tiền Giang	Episode 7	
Thạch Thu Thảo	21	321	1,77 m	Trà Vinh	Episode 7	
Hồ Vương Linh	22	814	1,76 m	Lào Cai	Episode 7	
Lê Như Thùy	23	120	1,68 m	Cần Thơ	Episode 8	
Đặng Thị Hồng Anh	20	144	1,70 m	Hanoi	Episode 8	
Nguyễn Hoàng Yến	24	247	1,63 m	Quảng Ngãi	Episode 8	
Hoàng Thùy Anh	23	324	1,75 m	Hanoi	Episode 8	
Nguyễn Thị Thanh Thùy	27	857	1,65 m	Ho Chi Minh City	Episode 8	
Đàng Vương Huyền Trân	21	131	1,76 m	Ninh Thuận	Episode 9	
Vũ Thanh Phương	21	138	1,71 m	Bà Rịa–Vũng Tàu	Episode 9	
Bùi Thị Linh	27	228	1,73 m	Thái Bình	Episode 9	
Tô Mai Thùy Dương	26	303	1,68 m	Quảng Ngãi	Episode 9	
Nguyễn Hoàng Bảo Trân	21	609	1,68 m	Ho Chi Minh City	Episode 9	

=== Golden Ticket ===
Award	Contestant
Golden Ticket	Đặng Thu Huyền (202)
Golden Ticket	Nguyễn Hoàng Yến (247)
Golden Ticket	Nguyễn Võ Ngọc Anh (239)
Golden Ticket	Nguyễn Thị Ngọc Châu (314)
Golden Ticket	Lê Thảo Nhi (311)
Golden Ticket	Nguyễn Thị Phương Thảo (686)
Honorary Golden Ticket	Đỗ Nhật Hà (325)

=== Silver Ticket ===
Award	Contestant
Silver Ticket	Hồ Nguyễn Quỳnh Anh (137)
Silver Ticket	Lý Tú Chi (308)
Silver Ticket	Lê Thị Trúc Đào (310)
Silver Ticket	Nguyễn Thị Hồng Ngọc (148)
Silver Ticket	Lê Phan Hạnh Nguyên (209)
Silver Ticket	Đặng Thị Hồng Anh (144)
Silver Ticket	Đàng Vương Huyền Trân (131)

== Judges ==
- Võ Thị Xuân Trang – John Robert Powers School's Principal.
- Lê Diệp Linh – Anthropometry Doctor.
- Vũ Nguyễn Hà Anh – Model, Singer, and represented Vietnam at Miss Earth 2006.
- H'Hen Niê – Miss Universe Vietnam 2017 and placed as Top 5 at Miss Universe 2018.
- Võ Hoàng Yến – Model, 1st Runner-up of Miss Universe Vietnam 2008 and represented Vietnam at Miss Universe 2009.
- Vũ Thị Hoàng My – 1st Runner-up of Miss Vietnam 2010, Filmmaker, Model, and represented Vietnam at Miss Universe 2011 and Miss World 2012.
- Vũ Thu Phương – Businesswoman and Model.
- Natalie Glebova – Miss Universe 2005 from Canada.
- Catriona Gray – Model, Singer, Host, Miss World 2016 Top 5, and Miss Universe 2018 from the Philippines.
- Harnaaz Kaur Sandhu - Miss Universe 2021 from India.
