= April 30 Park =

Park in the center of Ho Chi Minh City, Vietnam

- Công viên Ba Mươi Tháng Tư; Công viên 30/4
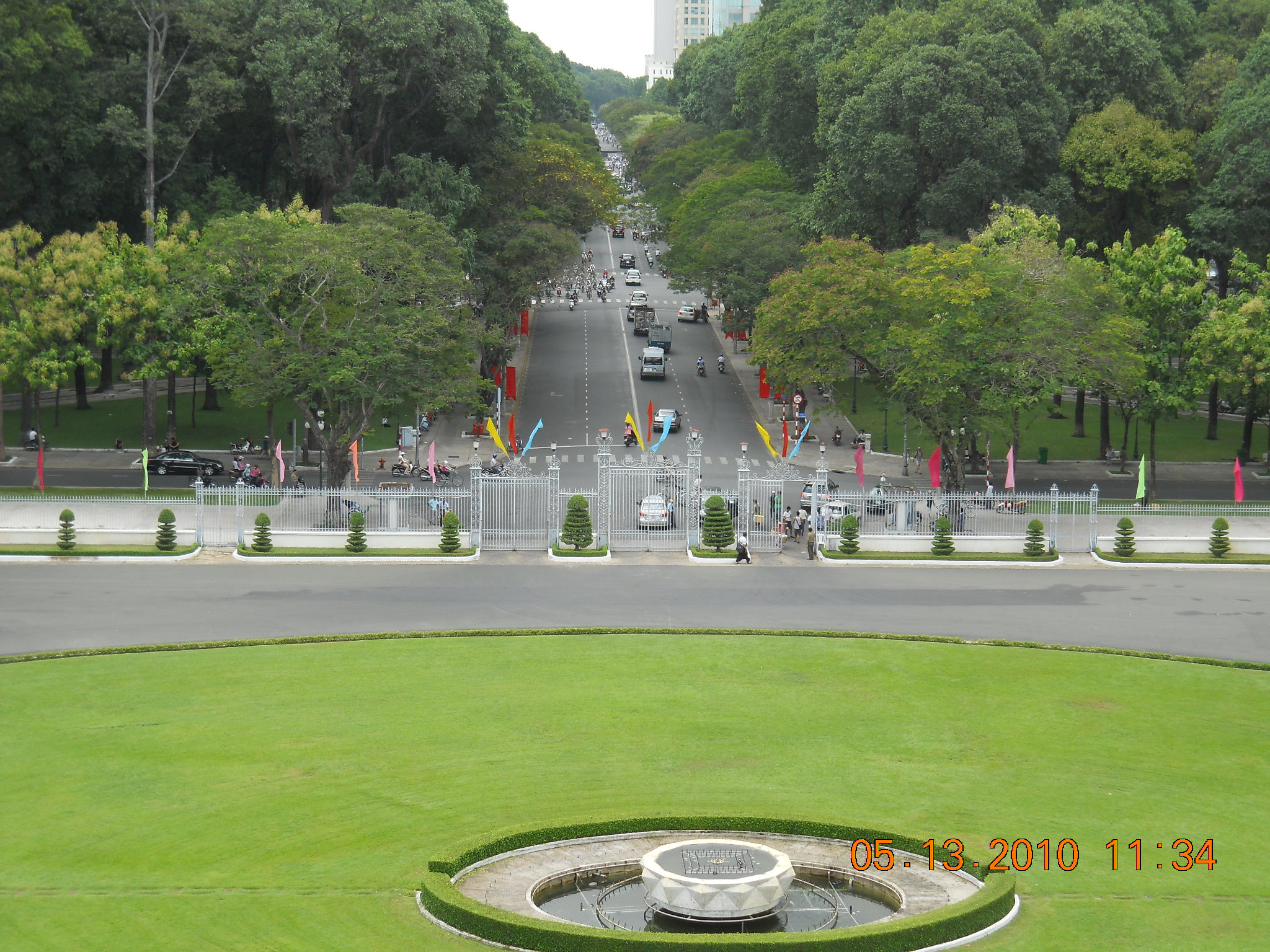
- The park as viewed from the upper floor of Independence Palace
- Interactive map of April 30 Park
- Location: District 1, Ho Chi Minh City
- Coordinates: 10°46′43″N 106°41′50″E
- Area: 3,500 square metres (0.86 acres)
- Status: Open all year

April 30 Park (Vietnamese: Công viên Ba Mươi Tháng Tư or shortened as Công viên 30/4) is a park located in the center of Ho Chi Minh City, Vietnam, within District 1 facing Independence Palace and behind Notre-Dame Cathedral Basilica of Saigon.

The park consists of four rectangular parcels of land divided by Lê Duẩn Boulevard and Pasteur Street, with a total ground area of 3.5 hectares (8.6 acres), including 2.5 hectares (6.2 acres) of greenery. Surrounding the park are the streets of Han Thuyen, Alexandre de Rhodes, Pham Ngoc Thach, and Nam Ky Khoi Nghia. The pair of Han Thuyen and Alexandre de Rhodes streets serve to honor two individuals who contributed to the development and dissemination of Chu Nom and Quoc Ngu scripts in Vietnam. According to the urban rail transit network plan of the city, April 30 Park will be connected to Line 4 of Ho Chi Minh City Metro at Nam Ky Khoi Nghia Station.

The corner of April 30 Park near Notre-Dame Cathedral Basilica is a place where many local young people lay newspapers on the ground to sit and enjoy coffee served in plastic cups by street vendors, without tables, chairs, or stores. This hobby is known as "ca phe bet" (literally "ground-sitting coffee"), which has been introduced and promoted by a number of mainstream media outlets.
