= Yên Lập Reservoir =

- Yên Lập Lake
- Hồ Yên Lập (Vietnamese)
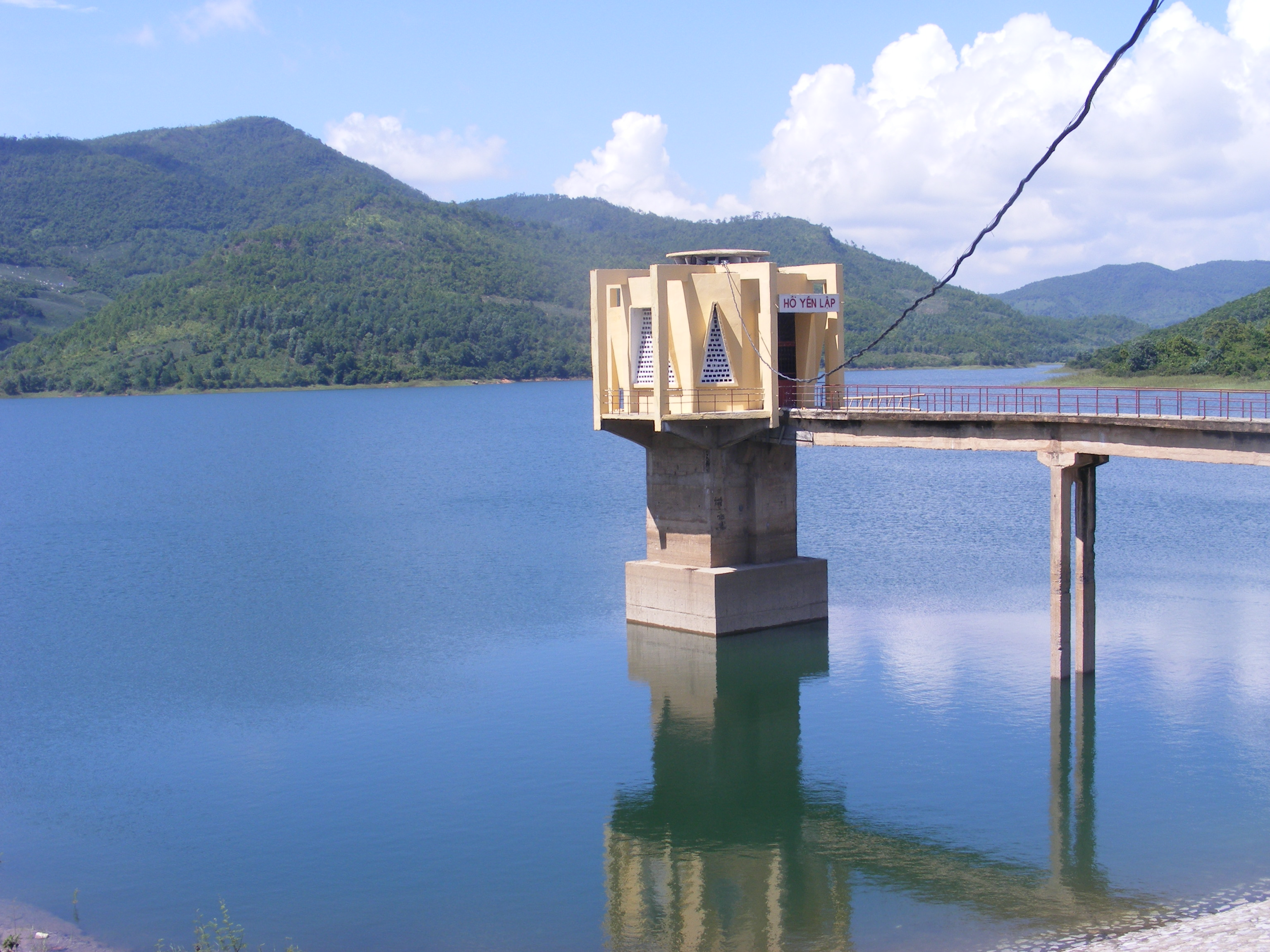
- Yên Lập Reservoir

- Location within Vietnam
- Location: Hoành Bồ District
- Coordinates: 20.999734°N 106.913727°E
- Lake type: Reservoir
- Primary inflows: Míp River
- Primary outflows: Yên Lập River
- Basin countries: Vietnam
- Max. length: 20 km (12 mi)
- Max. width: 500 m (1,600 ft)
- Max. depth: 30 m (98 ft)
- Water volume: 226 million cubic metres (8.0×10^{9} cu ft)
- Surface elevation: 30.20 m (99.1 ft)
- Islands: Bàn Tay, Canh, Cua, Giáp Giới
- Settlements: Quảng Ninh

Yên Lập Reservoir (Vietnamese: Hồ Yên Lập) is a large artificial freshwater lake in Hoành Bồ District, Quảng Ninh Province, Vietnam. Work began creating the dam on Míp River and Yên Lập River in 1978. It has a capacity of 128 million cubic metres.
