= Sting Energy =

Energy drink

Sting
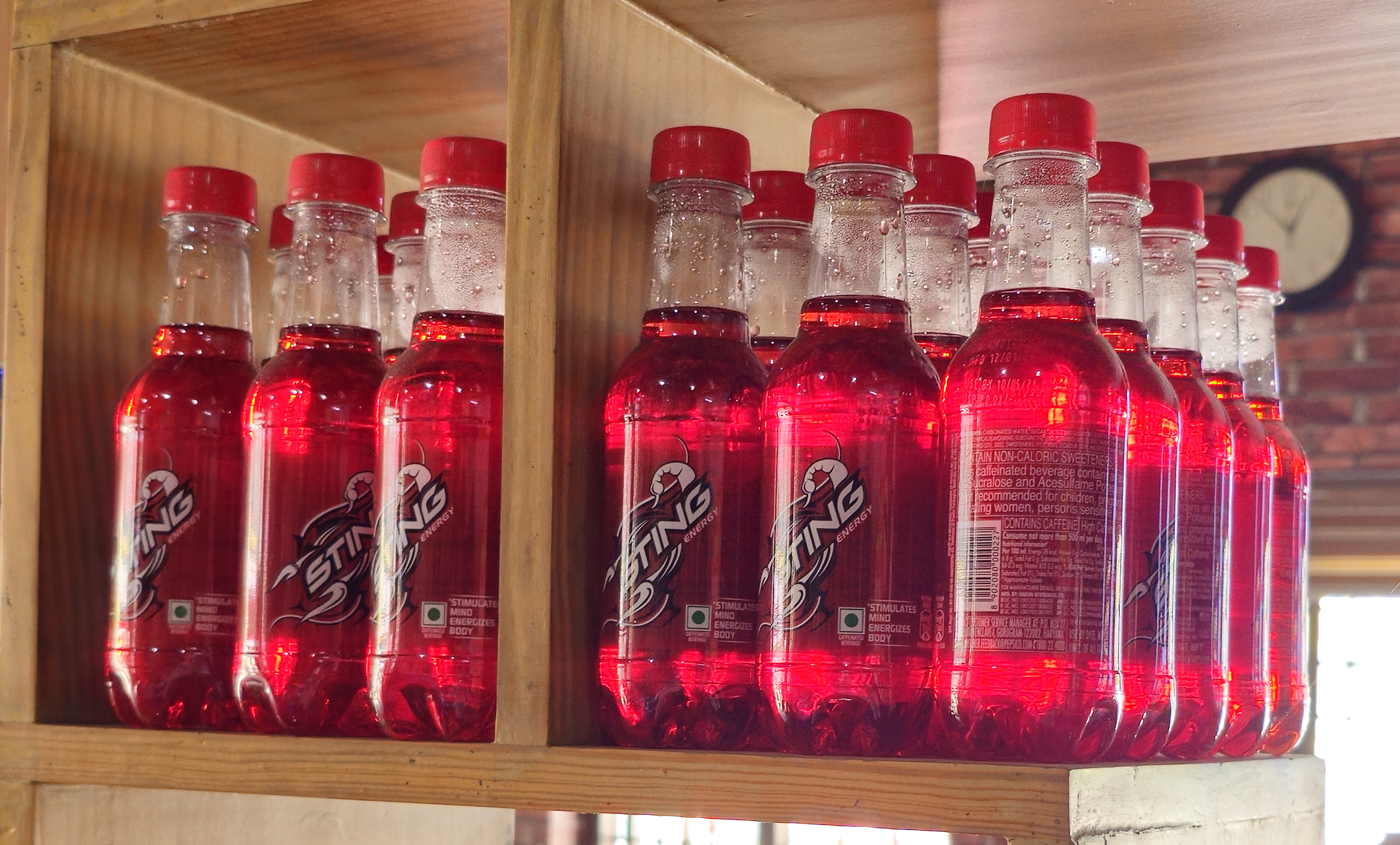
- Sting Energy Drink
- Type: Carbonated energy drink
- Manufacturer: Rockstar Inc. (PepsiCo)
- Introduced: 2002
- Flavor: Gold Rush (original); Gold Rush (with ginseng); Power Pacq (Gold Rush with Malunggay); Berry Blast (Strawberry); Blue Thunder (blue raspberry); Sting Pro (isotonic, chanh muối flavor)
- Variants: 250 ml bottle (plastic/glass); 300 ml bottle (plastic); 500 ml bottle (plastic)
- Website: https://www.stingenergy.com/#flavours

Sting Energy (or simply Sting) is a carbonated energy drink produced by Rockstar Inc. (acquired by PepsiCo in 2020). It was first announced in the Vietnamese market in 2002. The drink is sold primarily in Southeast Asia and parts of Africa, and is available in several flavors including Gold Rush, Power Pacq (with Malunggay), Berry Blast (Strawberry), and Blue Thunder (Blue Raspberry).

== Ingredients ==
Typical ingredients include carbonated water, sugar, citric acid, artificial flavor, maltodextrin, sodium citrate, sodium hexametaphosphate, potassium sorbate, caffeine, sodium benzoate, tartrazine, inositol, calcium disodium EDTA, modified food starch, Panax ginseng extract, niacinamide, sunset yellow FCF, pyridoxine hydrochloride, and cyanocobalamin.

== Nutritional information ==
Typical values (per 100 ml): 28 kcal, 7 g carbohydrate (all sugars), 0 g fat, 0 g protein. Consumer nutrition tools report approximately 28 kcal in 100 ml of Sting, equating to about 70 kcal per 250 ml serving.

The caffeine amount is reported on the international website as 288 mg/L while in Vietnam, the label indicates a range of 145–255 mg/L.

Nutrient	Per 250 ml serving (approx.)
Energy	70 kcal
Carbohydrate (sugars)	17.5 g
Fat / Protein	0 g
Sodium	— (not specified)
Caffeine	72 mg (international) 36–64 mg (Vietnam)

== Marketing and sponsorship ==
In May 2025, Sting Energy became the Official Energy Drink Partner of Formula 1, in a global partnership announced by PepsiCo. The collaboration stemmed from a viral moment when DJ Armin van Buuren noticed that the sound of “Stinggg” echoed in a Formula 1 engine note, sparking widespread attention and leading to the official sponsorship.

In a June 2026 live performance in Barcelona, DJ Alan Walker announced the single "The Sting Within Me" alongside the artist DREAMDNVR, in collaboration with Sting Energy and Formula 1, with the phrase "Get, Set, Sting".
