= Miss Universe Vietnam 2023 =

6th Miss Universe Vietnam pageant

- Date: September 29, 2023
- Presenters: Vĩnh Phú; Audrey Hiếu Nguyễn
- Venue: Hòa Bình Theater, Ho Chi Minh, Vietnam
- Broadcaster: Facebook Live; YouTube
- Entrants: 18
- Placements: 10
- Winner: Bùi Quỳnh Hoa; Hanoi

Miss Universe Vietnam 2023 was the sixth Miss Universe Vietnam pageant, held at the Hòa Bình Theater in Ho Chi Minh, Vietnam, on September 29, 2023.

This was the first Miss Universe Vietnam competition held by a new national license holder. The winner, Bùi Quỳnh Hoa of Hanoi, represented Vietnam at Miss Universe 2023.

== Contestants ==
Eighteen contestants competed for the title.

No	Contestants	Age	Height	Hometown
1	Huỳnh Kim Anh	23	1,75 m	Ho Chi Minh
2	Lê Thị Lan Anh	24	1,74 m	Vĩnh Phúc
3	Trịnh Thị Hồng Đăng	29	1,71 m	Ho Chi Minh
4	Emma Maria Fernandez Lê	23	1,70 m	Ho Chi Minh
5	H'Duyên Bkrông	23	1,72 m	Đắk Lắk
6	Bùi Quỳnh Hoa	25	1,75 m	Hanoi
7	Đinh Thị Hoa	22	1,73 m	Đắk Lắk
8	Trần Nhật Lệ	22	1,70 m	Quảng Ninh
9	Nguyễn Thị Hương Ly	28	1,76 m	Gia Lai
10	Lydie Marie Wache Vu	30	1,76 m	Ho Chi Minh
11	Trần Thị Ngọc Mai	24	1,68 m	Nghệ An
12	Nguyễn Diễm My	25	1,73 m	Cà Mau
13	Nguyễn Thị Lệ Nam	27	1,75 m	Tiền Giang
14	Trần Thị Ánh Nguyệt	23	1,74 m	Thái Bình
15	Nguyễn Thị Quỳnh Như	23	1,73 m	Đắk Lắk
16	Mai Phương Thảo	23	1,68 m	Quảng Ninh
17	Phạm Thị Anh Thư	26	1,75 m	Hà Nam
18	Phạm Hoàng Thu Uyên	26	1,68 m	Hải Phòng
