= Miss Vietnam 2026 =

- Date: October 10, 2026 (Preliminary); November 7, 2026 (Final)
- Presenters: Thiên Vũ; Thùy Linh (Preliminary); Đức Bảo; Khánh Vy (Final)
- Entertainment: Lưu Hiền Trinh; Will; Hoàng Rob (Preliminary); Minh Hằng; Văn Mai Hương; S.T Sơn Thạch; MaiQuinn; Minh Ngọc (Final)
- Venue: Dragon Ocean Đồ Sơn, Đồ Sơn, Hải Phòng
- Broadcaster: VTV8
- Entrants: 53
- Placements: 15
- Winner: Nguyễn Yến Trang; Hà Nội

Miss Vietnam 2026 (Vietnamese: Hoa hậu Việt Nam 2026) was the 20th edition of the Miss Vietnam pageant. It was held on November 7, 2026 at Dragon Ocean Đồ Sơn, Đồ Sơn, Hải Phòng, Vietnam. Miss Vietnam 2024 Hà Trúc Linh crowned her successor Nguyễn Yến Trang at the end of the event.

== Results ==
=== Placements ===
Final Resul	Contestant
Miss Vietnam 2026	362 – Nguyễn Yến Trang
1st Runner-up	818 – Trần Xuân Khánh Linh
2nd Runner-up	031 – Lê Phương Nghi
Top 5	116 – Đinh Hoàng Gia Linh; 308 – Đặng Thị Ngọc Lan
Top 10	168 – Nguyễn Thị Kim Châu; 186 – Đinh Diệu Anh; 240 – Nguyễn Thị Hoa; 510 – Bùi Mai Linh; 618 – Tạ Thị Hoa
Top 15	124 – Gouband Lisa; 290 – Lưu Phương Anh; 378 – Vũ Hồng Hạnh (§); 602 – Nguyễn Thục Uyên Nhi; 826 – Phạm Lê Ái Linh

(§) - Miss Popular Vote winner.

=== Special awards ===
Special award	Contestant
Miss Popular Vote	378 – Vũ Hồng Hạnh
Miss Beach	510 – Bùi Mai Linh
Miss Humanity	818 – Trần Xuân Khánh Linh
Miss Tourism and Environment	618 – Tạ Thị Hoa
Miss Media and Arts	116 – Đinh Hoàng Gia Linh
ĐMiss Sports and Fashion	186 – Đinh Diệu Anh

== Judges ==
Name	Note
Northern Region Preliminary Round
Đặng Thái Huyền	Colonel, Meritorious Artist, deputy director of the People's Army Cinema
Hoàng Công Cường	Director
Lê Thanh Hòa	Designer
Phan Minh Châu	Singer
Trần Hồng Ngọc	Presenter
Hà Trúc Linh	Miss Vietnam 2024
Southern Regional Preliminaries
Lê Thiện Viễn	Director, Photographer
Lê Thanh Hòa	Designer
Hứa Vĩ Văn	Performer, Model
Lê Diệu Minh	Journalist, Editor
Phan Lê Ái Phương	Singer, Songwriter, Actress, Model
Hà Trúc Linh	Miss Vietnam 2024
Semifinals and Finals
Phùng Công Sưởng	Editor-in-Chief of Tiền Phong Newspaper
Đặng Thái Huyền	Colonel, Meritorious Artist, deputy director of the People's Army Cinema
Nguyễn Việt Khôi	Vice President of Vietnam National University, Hanoi
Lê Thiện Viễn	Director, Photographer
Lê Thanh Hòa	Designer
Trần Hồng Ngọc	Presenter
Phạm Thị Mai Phương	Miss Vietnam 2002
Đỗ Mỹ Linh	Miss Vietnam 2016

== Contestant ==
=== Top 25 ===
No.	Name	Year Birth	Height	Hometown	Result
186	Đinh Diệu Anh	2003	168 m (551 ft 2 in)	Hà Nội	Top 10
290	Lưu Phương Anh	2002	171 m (561 ft 1/2 in)	Hải Phòng	Top 15
168	Nguyễn Thị Kim Châu	2006	174 m (570 ft 10 1/2 in)	Thành phố Hồ Chí Minh	Top 10
638	Phạm Vân Hà	2008	175 m (574 ft 2 in)	Hải Phòng	
378	Vũ Hồng Hạnh	2003	171 m (561 ft 1/2 in)	Phú Thọ	Top 15
240	Nguyễn Thị Hoa	2004	172 m (564 ft 3 1/2 in)	Đồng Nai	Top 10
618	Tạ Thị Hoa	2005	170 m (557 ft 9 in)	Thái Nguyên	Top 10
864	Trịnh Ngọc Huyền	2007	172 m (564 ft 3 1/2 in)	Gia Lai	
308	Đặng Thị Ngọc Lan	2007	173 m (567 ft 7 in)	Hà Nội	Top 5
510	Bùi Mai Linh	2006	173 m (567 ft 7 in)	Hải Phòng	Top 10
116	Đinh Hoàng Gia Linh	2006	174 m (570 ft 10 1/2 in)	Thành phố Hồ Chí Minh	Top 5
856	Nguyễn Thị Thúy Linh	2007	175 m (574 ft 2 in)	Hà Nội	
826	Phạm Lê Ái Linh	2007	168 m (551 ft 2 in)	Hưng Yên	Top 15
818	Trần Xuân Khánh Linh	2006	169 m (554 ft 5 1/2 in)	Thành phố Hồ Chí Minh	1st Runner-up
124	Gouband Lisa	2007	171 m (561 ft 1/2 in)	Thành phố Hồ Chí Minh	Top 15
031	Lê Phương Nghi	2006	172 m (564 ft 3 1/2 in)	Gia Lai	2nd Runner-up
982	Nguyễn Hồng Hạ Nghi	2006	174 m (570 ft 10 1/2 in)	Đà Nẵng	
568	Nguyễn Ngọc Thảo Nguyên	2006	172 m (564 ft 3 1/2 in)	Huế	
076	Mai Thị Yến Nhi	2006	173 m (567 ft 7 in)	Ninh Bình	
602	Nguyễn Thục Uyên Nhi	2004	175 m (574 ft 2 in)	Hà Nội	Top 15
082	Bùi Minh Phương	2005	170 m (557 ft 9 in)	Hà Nội	
693	Hoàng Thị Hà Phương	2004	168 m (551 ft 2 in)	Hải Phòng	
582	Nguyễn Thái Anh Thư	2006	170 m (557 ft 9 in)	Đồng Tháp	
362	Nguyễn Yến Trang	2006	173 m (567 ft 7 in)	Hà Nội	Winner
090	Vũ Thị Khánh Vi	2004	165 m (541 ft 4 in)	Ninh Bình	

=== Top 32 ===
No.	Name	Year Birth	Height	Hometowm
226	Ngô Thị Mai Hoa	2005	173 m (567 ft 7 in)	Bắc Ninh
024	Đoàn Hải Lan	2001	168 m (551 ft 2 in)	Hà Nội
716	Lê Trần Bảo My	2005	176 m (577 ft 5 in)	Hà Nội
442	Lê Kim Ngân	2006	168 m (551 ft 2 in)	Hà Nội
976	Trương Văn Tú Tâm	2003	169 m (554 ft 5 1/2 in)	Đắk Lắk
326	Bùi Thị Thái Thanh	2006	178 m (584 ft 0 in)	Hải Phòng
912	Nguyễn Thị Thảo	2006	167 m (547 ft 11 in)	Nghệ An

=== Top 53 ===
No.	Name	Year Birth	Height	Hometowm
723	Cao Trần Tú Anh	2004	177 m (580 ft 8 1/2 in)	Vĩnh Long
832	Đinh Thị Quỳnh Anh	2006	170 m (557 ft 9 in)	Hà Nội
745	Ngô Hà Anh	2008	169 m (554 ft 5 1/2 in)	Thái Nguyên
380	Nguyễn Thị Quỳnh Anh	2007	172 m (564 ft 3 1/2 in)	Hải Phòng
758	Đinh Ngọc Châu	2001	172 m (564 ft 3 1/2 in)	Hải Phòng
180	Nguyễn Diệu Chi	2007	163 m (534 ft 9 1/2 in)	Nghệ An
108	Vũ Lâm Bảo Chi	2008	175 m (574 ft 2 in)	Ninh Bình
425	Nguyễn Thị Thúy Dung	2004	170 m (557 ft 9 in)	Lâm Đồng
276	Nguyễn Thị Hạnh	2006	170 m (557 ft 9 in)	Thái Nguyên
672	Nguyễn Minh Hiền	2006	170 m (557 ft 9 in)	Nghệ An
232	Nèang Lin	2003	164 m (538 ft 1/2 in)	An Giang
282	Nguyễn Bùi Mai Linh	2004	174 m (570 ft 10 1/2 in)	Hà Tĩnh
345	Trần Phương Linh	2006	167 m (547 ft 11 in)	Hà Nội
532	Thẩm Khánh Ly	2007	167 m (547 ft 11 in)	Thái Nguyên
482	Tống Khánh Ly	2006	170 m (557 ft 9 in)	Hà Nội
934	Nguyễn Phương Nghi	2005	170 m (557 ft 9 in)	Thành phố Hồ Chí Minh
539	Văn Hà Phương Nhi	2000	172 m (564 ft 3 1/2 in)	Thành phố Hồ Chí Minh
568	Phạm Thị Phương	2006	172 m (564 ft 3 1/2 in)	Ninh Bình
526	Nguyễn Thị Sen	2006	168 m (551 ft 2 in)	Nghệ An
668	Dương Quỳnh Trang	2008	180 m (590 ft 6 1/2 in)	Hà Nội
460	Nguyễn Hải Yến	2008	171 m (561 ft 1/2 in)	Thái Nguyên
