= Tran Quoc An =

Tran Quoc An may refer to:

- Trần Quốc Ân (active 1940s) Vietnamese painter, at the Hanoi Art School
- Trần Quốc Ẩn (born 1961) Vietnamese calligrapher notable for making giant size books
