= Nguyễn Yến Trang =

Vietnamese model and beauty pageant titleholder

- Born: Nguyễn Yến Trang; October 2, 2006 (age 20); Hà Nội, Vietnam
- Education: Hanoi Metropolitan University
- Beauty pageant titleholder
- Title: Miss Vietnam 2026
- Hair color: Black
- Eye color: Black
- Major competitions: Miss Student Vietnam 2025 (Top 28); Miss Vietnam 2026 (Winner)

Nguyễn Yến Trang (born 2 October 2006) is a Vietnamese model and beauty pageant titleholder, She was crowned Miss Vietnam 2026, She previously reached the Top 28 of Miss Student Vietnam 2025.

== Early life ==
Trang was born in 2006 in Hà Nội, Vietnam. A former student of Phan Dinh Phung High School (Hanoi), she was recognized as an outstanding student for three consecutive years. Following her high school graduation, she was accepted into the Academy of Finance, the University of Economics (Vietnam National University, Hanoi), and the Hanoi Metropolitan University. Ultimately, she chose to pursue a degree in Primary Education, with the goal of becoming a teacher.

== Pageant ==
She previously participated in the Miss Vietnam Student 2025 pageant and finished in the Top 28.

On November 7, 2026, she was officially crowned the winner of the 20th Miss Vietnam 2026 pageant, held at the Dragon Ocean International Tourism Complex in Đồ Sơn Ward, Hải Phòng. She was crowned by her predecessor, Miss Vietnam 2024 Hà Trúc Linh, at the conclusion of the final.

Awards and achievements
| Preceded by Hà Trúc Linh | Miss Vietnam; 2026 | Succeeded by Incumbent |
