= Miss Vietnam 2008 =

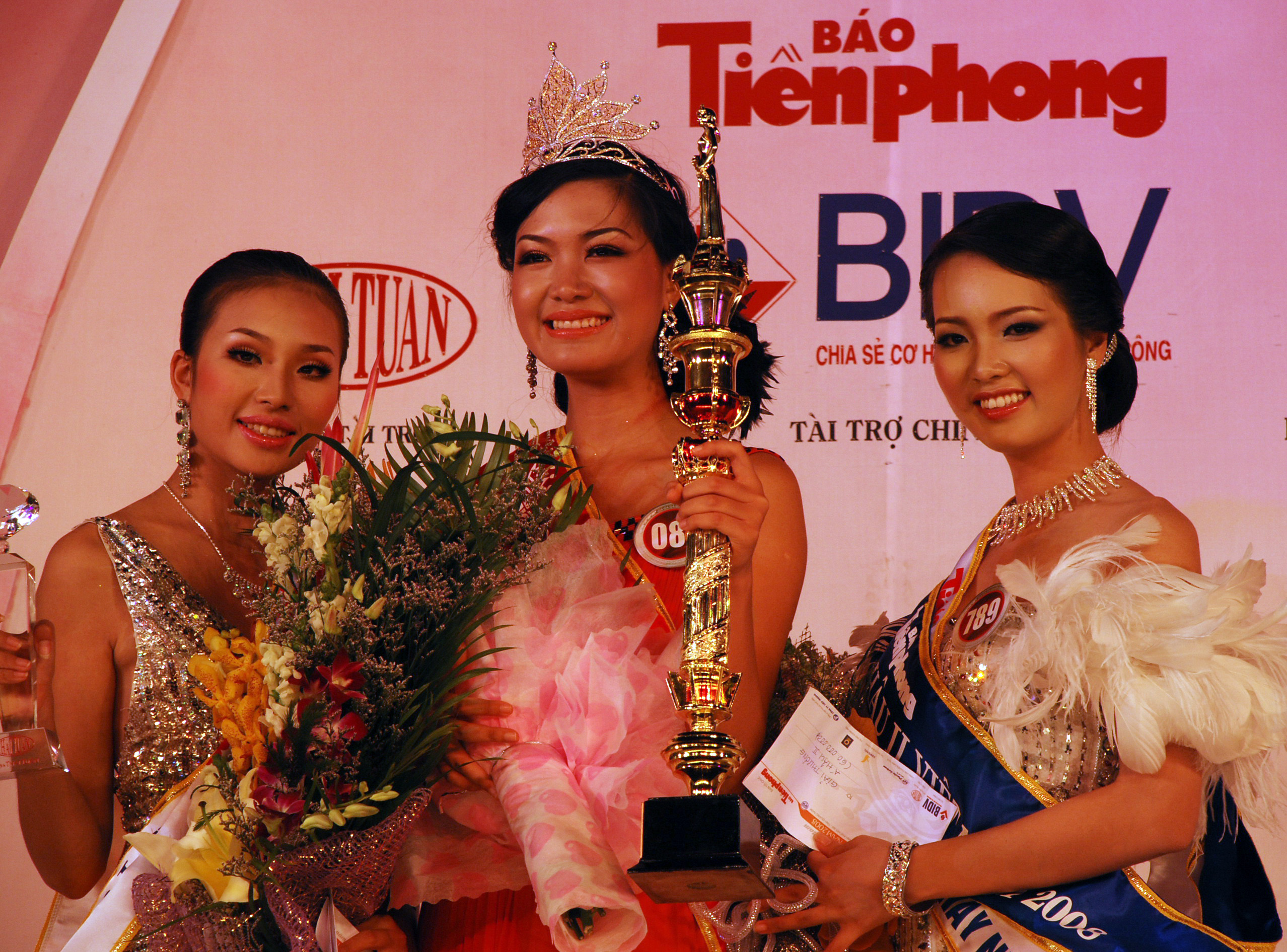
- Top 3 Miss Vietnam 2008
- Date: August 31, 2008
- Presenters: Phạm Anh Tuấn; Nguyễn Thị Ngọc Khánh
- Entertainment: Hồ Quỳnh Hương, Kasim Hoàng Vũ, Phương Linh, Đức Tuấn
- Venue: Hoài River Square, Hội An, Quảng Nam
- Broadcaster: VTV
- Entrants: 30
- Placements: 10
- Winner: Trần Thị Thùy Dung; Da Nang

Miss Vietnam 2008 (Vietnamese: Hoa hậu Việt Nam 2008) was the 11th edition of the Miss Vietnam pageant. It was held on 31 August 2008 at Hoài River Square, Hội An, Quảng Nam. Trần Thị Thùy Dung from Đà Nẵng was crowned Miss Vietnam 2008.

In 2008 marked the 20th anniversary of the Miss Vietnam pageant and the 55th anniversary of the founding of Tiền Phong newspaper. To commemorate this event, starting in 2008, the new Miss Vietnam crown will be awarded on a rotating basis.

== Results ==
=== Placements ===
Final result	Contestant
Miss Vietnam 2008	Trần Thị Thùy Dung
1st Runner-Up	Phan Hoàng Minh Thư
2nd Runner-Up	Nguyễn Thụy Vân
Top 5	Đậu Thị Hồng Phúc; Lâm Thu Hằng
Top 10	Phan Thị Diễm Châu; Trịnh Thị Minh Huệ; Nguyễn Linh Chi; Võ Thị Lệ Thu; Nguyễn Hồng Nhung

=== Special awards ===
Special Award	Contestant
Miss Photo	Thạch Thị Hồng Nhung
Miss Sea	Lâm Thu Hằng
Miss Congeniality	Đậu Thị Hồng Phúc
The person who wears the most beautiful ao dai	Lê Thị Mây
The most voted beauty	Vũ Thị Hoàng Điệp
The best behaved beauty	Nguyễn Thụy Vân

== Contestants ==
30 contestants in the final.

Contestants	Years old	Homet
Nguyễn Thị Chúc Anh		
Vũ Thị Anh		
Nguyễn Thu Quỳnh	20	Hà Nội
Nguyễn Ngọc Diệp		
Trần Thị Diễm Hương		
Lê Hoàng Bảo Ngọc		
Vũ Hải Hà		
Phạm Diệu Linh		
Bùi Thị Ánh Tuyết		
Lê Thị Mây		
Nguyễn Thị Hồng Nhung		
Nguyễn Thị Ngọc Hà		
Lý Hồng Nhung		
Nguyễn Thị Diễm Hạnh		
Thạch Thị Hồng Nhung		
Doãn Thị Như Trang		
Đinh Thị Hằng Ni		
Vũ Thị Hoàng Điệp	21	Đồng Nai
Hồ Thị Oanh Yến		
Nguyễn Minh Ngọc Trâm		
