= Tôn Đức Lượng =

Vietnamese painter (1925–2023)

Tôn Đức Lượng (1925 – 10 February 2023) was a Vietnamese painter.

Ton was born in Bắc Ninh in 1925. He studied at the École des Beaux Arts de l'Indochine in the class of 1944–1945 together with other famous painters such as Phan Kế An, Dương Bích Liên, Nguyễn Địch Dũng, Trần Quốc Ân. He worked for Tien Phong newspaper during the First Indochina War and was officially in charge of illustrations from 1957 to 1982. He died in Hanoi on 10 February 2023.
