= Miss Vietnam =

National beauty pageant competition in Vietnam

- Hoa hậu Việt Nam
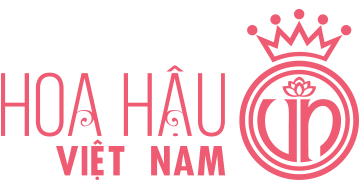
- Type: National beauty pageant
- Parent organization: Tiền Phong newspaper
- Headquarters: Hanoi, Vietnam
- First edition: 1988
- Most recent edition: 2026
- Current titleholder: Nguyễn Yến Trang; Hanoi
- President: Phùng Công Sưởng
- Formerly called: Miss National Tiền Phong Newspaper
- Network: Vietnam Television
- Language: Vietnamese
- Website: hhvn.com.vn

Miss Vietnam (Vietnamese: Hoa hậu Việt Nam) is the oldest and most prestigious national beauty contest in Vietnam, that has been held biennially since 1988. The contest is organized by Tiền Phong – a mouthpiece by Central Committee of the Ho Chi Minh Communist Youth Union, the youth wing of the Communist Party of Vietnam, the country's only political organization.

The contest is held every two years, with the main goal of the contest being to seek and honor the comprehensive beauty of Vietnamese women, including: beauty, intelligence, culture and kindness. The contest is not only a beauty contest but also a place to spread good values, inspire and contribute positively to the community.

The current Miss Vietnam titleholder is Nguyễn Yến Trang from Hanoi, who was crowned on November 7, 2026 in Haiphong.

== Formation system ==
=== History ===
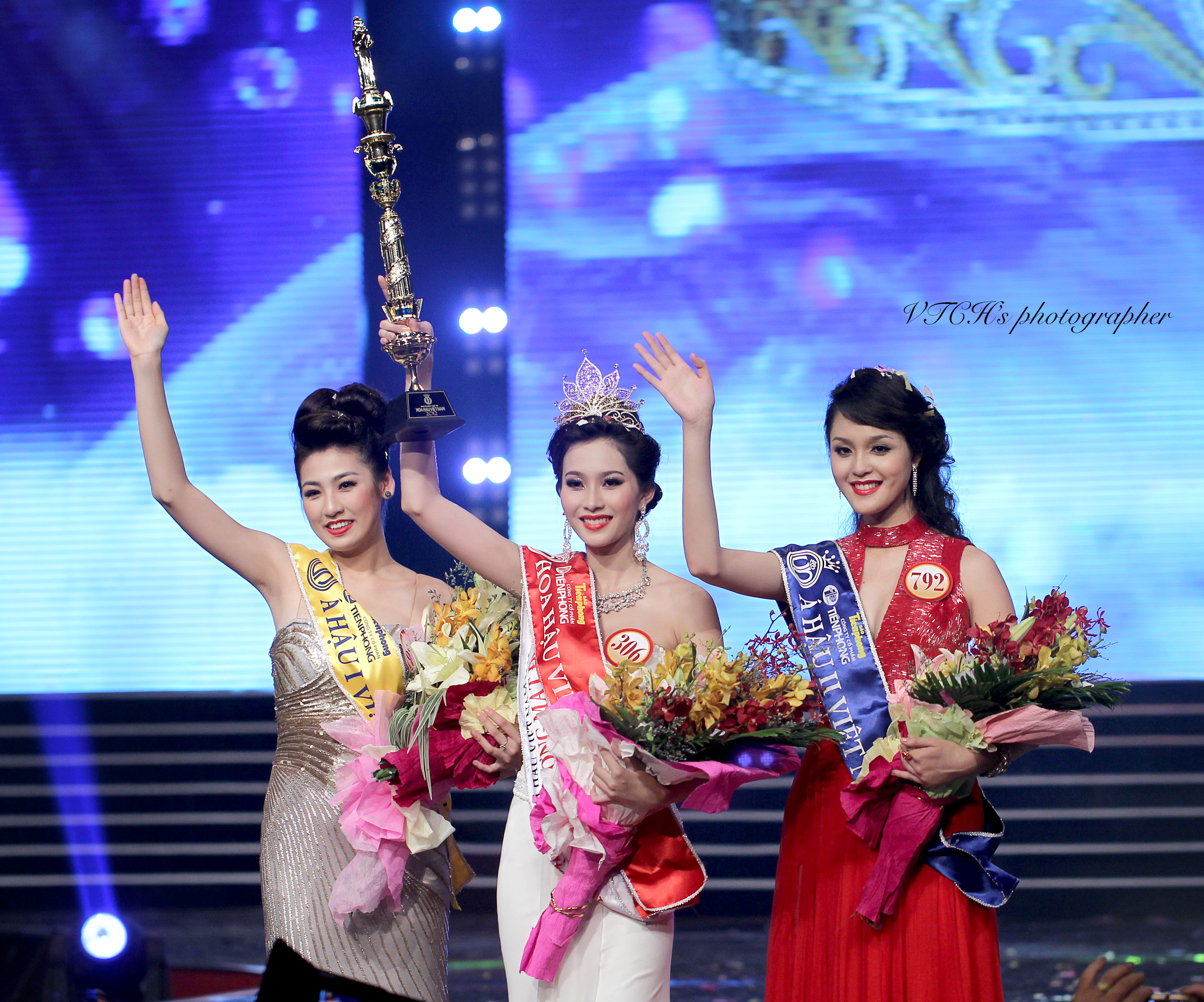
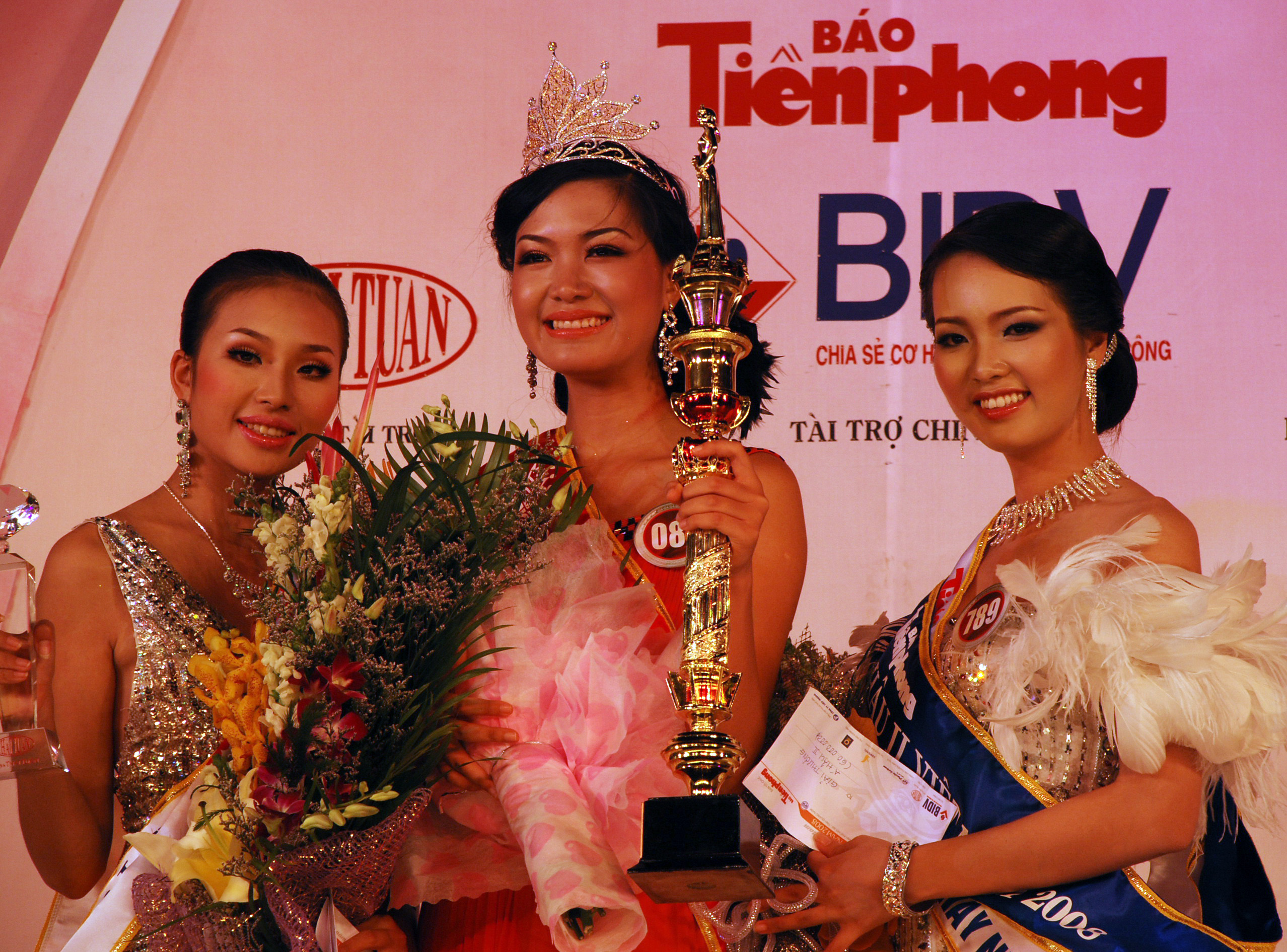

Miss Vietnam is the biggest beauty pageant and the first nationwide beauty contest after the reunification of Vietnam. Before that, there was also a South Vietnamese Saigon–based beauty contest named Cuộc thi tìm kiếm người đẹp tại Sài Gòn (Note: lit. 'Beauty Contest in Saigon'). In 1955, Công Thị Nghĩa became the first titleholder of the contest as well as the first national beauty pageant titleholder in Vietnamese history. In 1965, the title was held with the coronation of Thái Kim Hương.

The after-unification contest Miss Vietnam was initiated and organized by Tiền Phong – a daily newspaper published by the Central Committee of the Ho Chi Minh Communist Youth Union, the youth wing of the Communist Party of Vietnam. Initially the contest was called "Miss National Tiền Phong Newspaper", starting from 1988 and is held every two years, the contest was officially renamed as "Miss Vietnam" in 2002. The first person to hold the title is Bùi Bích Phương. The pageant was created with the purpose of finding women with good morals, knowledge and representing the image of Vietnamese women.

During the period from 1988 to 2000, beauty queens did not participate in international beauty contests. In 2002, they were sent to participate in Miss World. From 2008 to 2014, due to issues surrounding the beauty queens, they could not attend Miss World. From 2016 to 2020, they continued to participate in Miss World. Starting from 2022, Miss Vietnam will attend Miss International,

=== Broadcast ===
The beauty pageant has been broadcast on Vietnam Television (VTV) since 1998. From 1998–2008 and 2012–, the contest was broadcast live on VTV1, VTV2, VTV3 and VTV9. In 2010, the contest was broadcast by Vietnam Digital Television (VTC).

== Titleholders ==
- Miss World Vietnam
- Miss Universe Vietnam
- Miss International Vietnam
- Miss Earth Vietnam
- Miss Grand Vietnam
- Miss Intercontinental Vietnam
- Miss Tourism Vietnam

Year	Miss Vietnam	1st Runner-Up	2nd Runner-Up	Venue	Entrants
1988	Bùi Bích Phương; Hanoi	Nguyễn Thu Mai †; Hanoi	—N/a	Youth Cultural Palace, Hanoi	Unknown
1990	Nguyễn Diệu Hoa; Hanoi	Trần Vân Anh; Ho Chi Minh City	Trần Thu Hằng; Hanoi	Vietnam-Soviet Friendship Cultural Palace, Hanoi	Unknown
1992	Hà Kiều Anh; Ho Chi Minh City	Vi Thị Đông; Hanoi	Nguyễn Minh Phương; Tuyên Quang province	Phan Dinh Phung Sports Complex, Ho Chi Minh City	21
1994	Nguyễn Thu Thuỷ †; Hanoi	Tô Hương Lan; Tuyên Quang province	Trịnh Kim Chi; Ho Chi Minh City	Vietnam-Soviet Friendship Cultural Palace, Hanoi	Unknown
1996	Nguyễn Thiên Nga; Ho Chi Minh City	Vũ Minh Thúy; Haiphong	Đỗ Vân Anh; Hanoi	Vietnam-Soviet Friendship Cultural Palace, Hanoi	Unknown
1998	Nguyễn Thị Ngọc Khánh; Ho Chi Minh City	Vũ Thị Thu; Quảng Ninh province	Ngô Thúy Hà; Hanoi	Phan Dinh Phung Sports Complex, Ho Chi Minh City	23
2000	Phan Thu Ngân; Ho Chi Minh City	Lê Thanh Nga; Thái Bình province	Nguyễn Ngọc Oanh; Haiphong	Phan Dinh Phung Sports Complex, Ho Chi Minh City	22
2002	Phạm Thị Mai Phương; Haiphong	Bùi Thị Hoàng Oanh; Ho Chi Minh City	Nguyễn Thị Mai Hương; Hải Dương province	Phan Dinh Phung Sports Complex, Ho Chi Minh City	22
2004	Nguyễn Thị Huyền; Haiphong	Trịnh Chân Trân; Ho Chi Minh City	Nguyễn Thị Ngọc Bích; Bến Tre province	Water Show Amphitheater, Hạ Long, Quảng Ninh province	21
2006	Mai Phương Thúy; Hanoi	Lưu Bảo Anh; Cần Thơ	Lương Thị Ngọc Lan; Ho Chi Minh City	Vinpearl Land, Nha Trang, Khánh Hòa province	34
2008	Trần Thị Thùy Dung; Da Nang	Phan Hoàng Minh Thư; Lâm Đồng province	Nguyễn Thụy Vân; Hanoi	Hoai River Square, Hội An, Quảng Nam province	30
2010	Đặng Thị Ngọc Hân; Hanoi	Vũ Thị Hoàng My; Đồng Nai province	Đặng Thị Thùy Trang; Hanoi	Water Show Amphitheater, Hạ Long, Quảng Ninh province	37
2012	Đặng Thu Thảo; Bạc Liêu province	Dương Tú Anh; Hanoi	Đỗ Hoàng Anh; Hanoi	Tiên Sơn Sports Complex, Da Nang	40
2014	Nguyễn Cao Kỳ Duyên; Nam Định province	Nguyễn Trần Huyền My; Hanoi	Nguyễn Lâm Diễm Trang; Vĩnh Long province	Water Show Amphitheater, Phú Quốc, Kiên Giang province	40
2016	Đỗ Mỹ Linh; Hanoi	Ngô Thanh Thanh Tú; Hanoi	Huỳnh Thị Thùy Dung; Ho Chi Minh City	Phu Tho Arena, Ho Chi Minh City	36
2018	Trần Tiểu Vy; Quảng Nam province	Bùi Phương Nga; Hanoi	Nguyễn Thị Thúy An; Kiên Giang province	Phu Tho Arena, Ho Chi Minh City	43
2020	Đỗ Thị Hà; Thanh Hóa province	Phạm Ngọc Phương Anh; Ho Chi Minh City	Nguyễn Lê Ngọc Thảo; Ho Chi Minh City	Phu Tho Arena, Ho Chi Minh City	60
2022	Huỳnh Thị Thanh Thủy; Da Nang	Trịnh Thùy Linh; Thanh Hóa province	Lê Nguyễn Ngọc Hằng; Ho Chi Minh City	Phu Tho Arena, Ho Chi Minh City	58
2024	Hà Trúc Linh; Phú Yên province	Trần Ngọc Châu Anh; Hanoi	Nguyễn Thị Vân Nhi; Haiphong	Water Stage, Hương River, Huế Ancient Capital, Huế City	41
2026	Nguyễn Yến Trang; Hanoi	Trần Xuân Khánh Linh; Ho Chi Minh City	Lê Phương Nghi; Gia Lai province	Dragon Ocean Đồ Sơn, Đồ Sơn, Haiphong	53

=== Provincial rankings ===
Province/Municipality	Titles	Winning years
Hanoi	7	1988, 1990, 1994, 2006, 2010, 2016, 2026
Ho Chi Minh City	4	1992, 1996, 1998, 2000
Da Nang	3	2008, 2018 (Note: Quảng Nam province now has become a part of Da Nang), 2022
Haiphong	2	2002, 2004
Đắk Lắk province	1	2024 (Note: Phú Yên province now has become a part of Đắk Lắk province)
Thanh Hóa province	1	2020
Ninh Bình province	1	2014 (Note: Nam Định province now has become a part of Ninh Bình province)
Cà Mau province	1	2012 (Note: Bạc Liêu province now has become a part of Cà Mau province)

=== Regional rankings ===
Region	Titles	Winning years
Red River Delta	10	1988, 1990, 1994, 2002, 2004, 2006, 2010, 2014, 2016, 2026
Southest	4	1992, 1996, 1998, 2000
South Central Coast	4	2008, 2018, 2022, 2024
Mekong Delta	1	2012
North Central Coast	1	2020

=== Gallery of winners ===
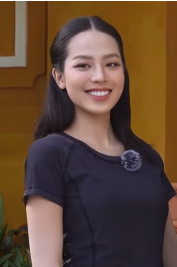
Miss Vietnam 2022
Huỳnh Thị Thanh Thủy

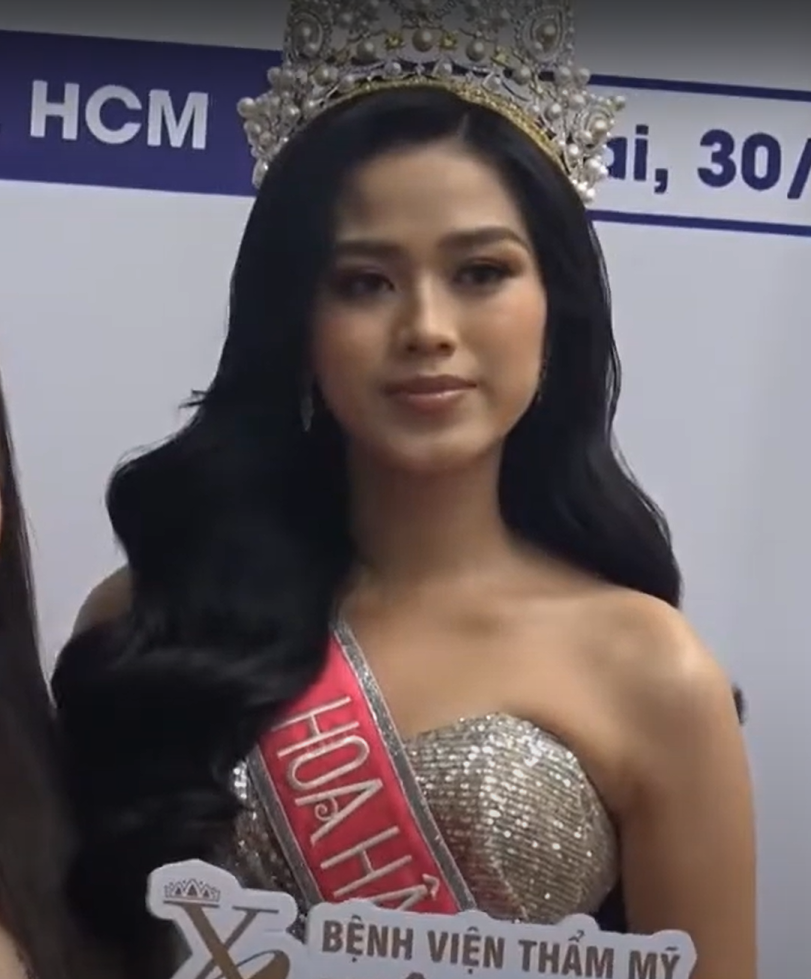
Miss Vietnam 2020
Đỗ Thị Hà

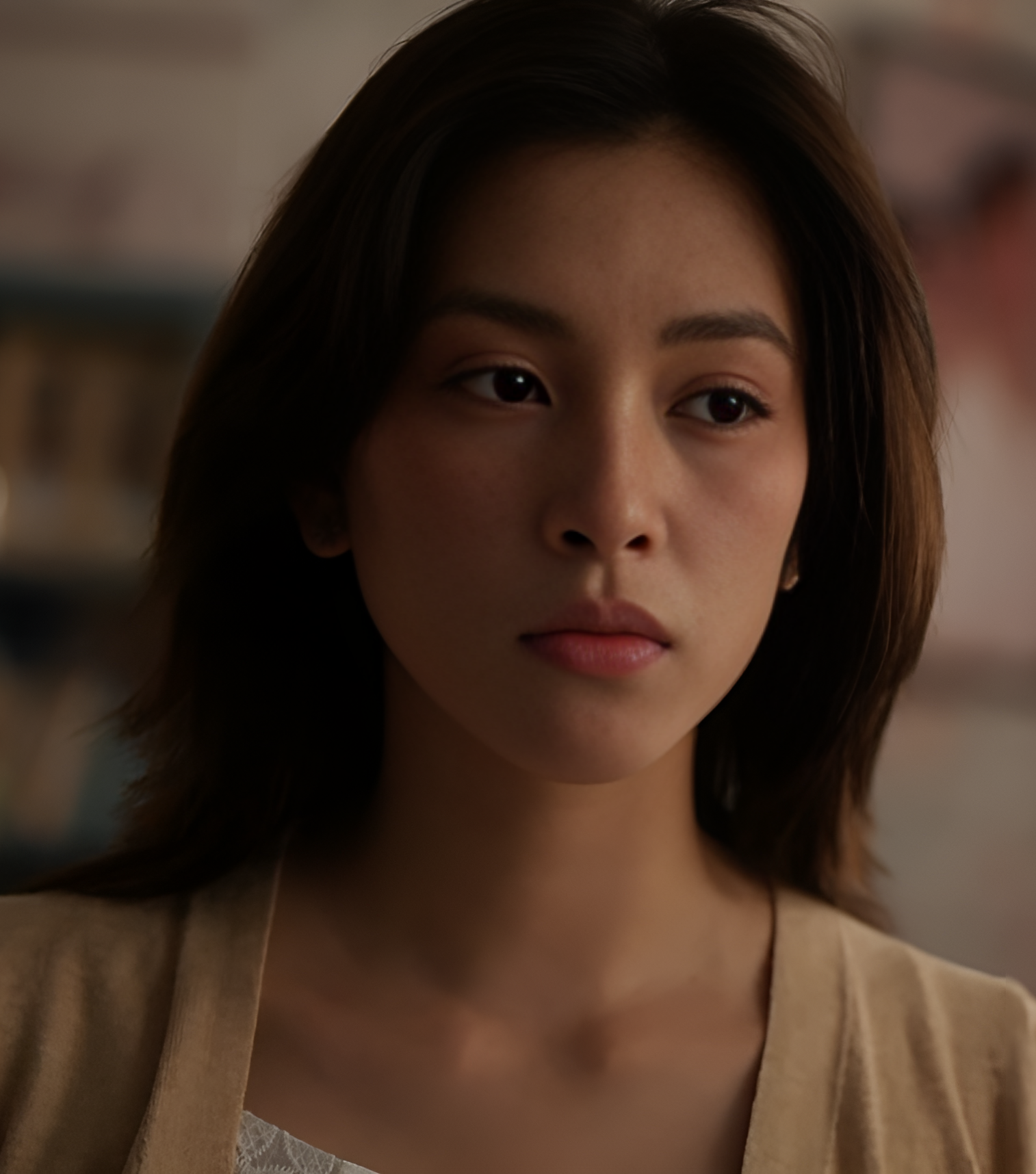
Miss Vietnam 2018
Trần Tiểu Vy

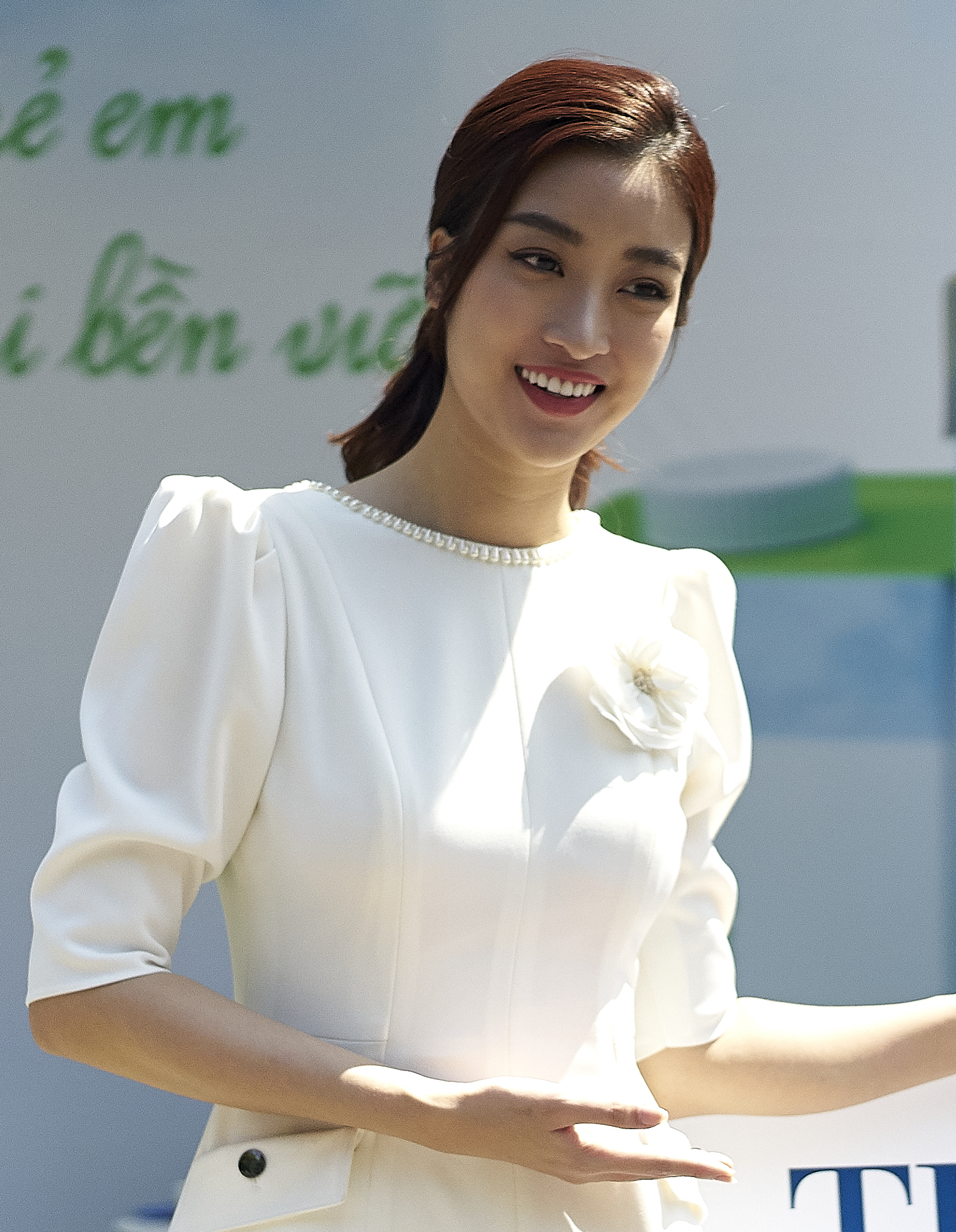
Miss Vietnam 2016
Đỗ Mỹ Linh

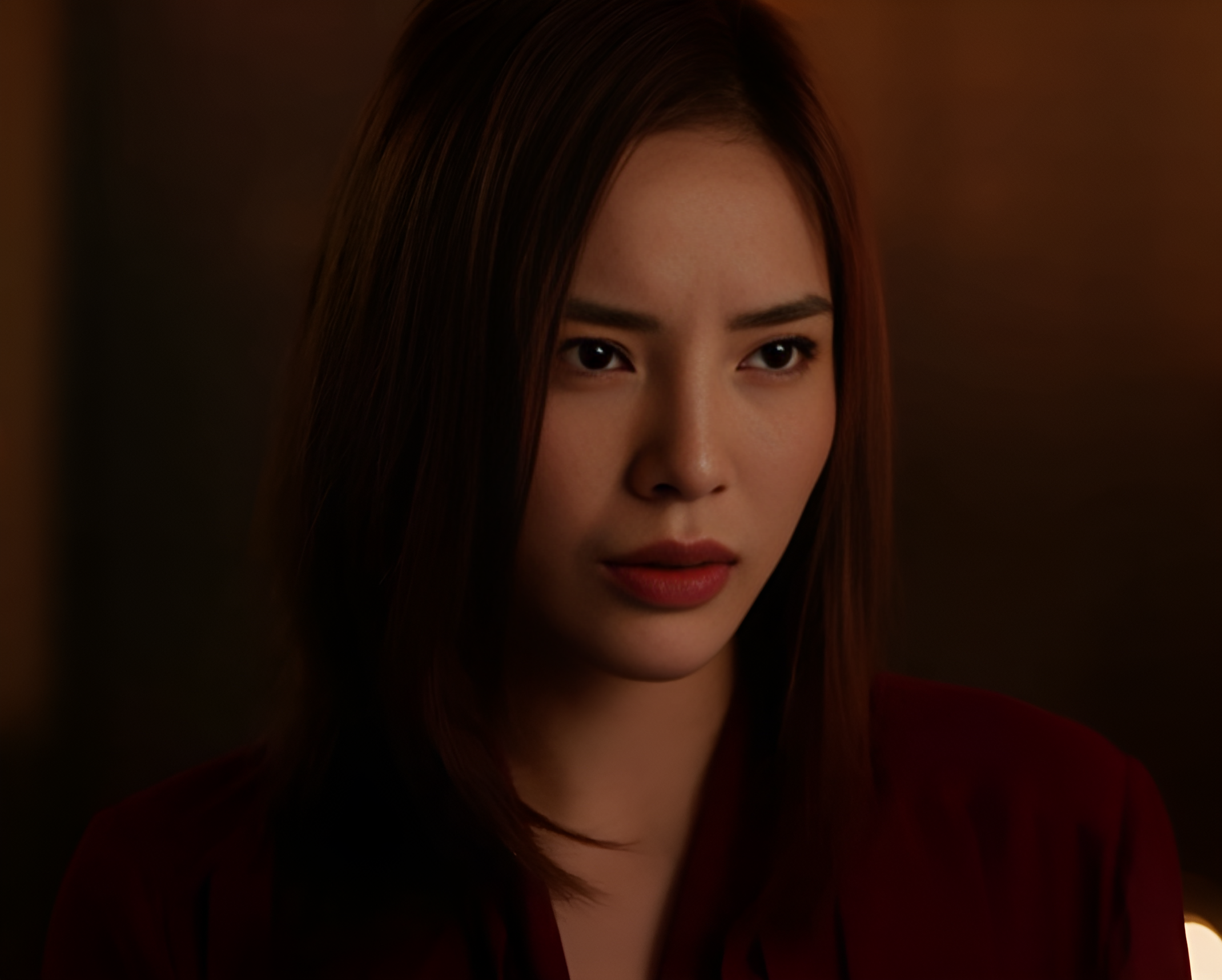
Miss Vietnam 2014
Nguyễn Cao Kỳ Duyên

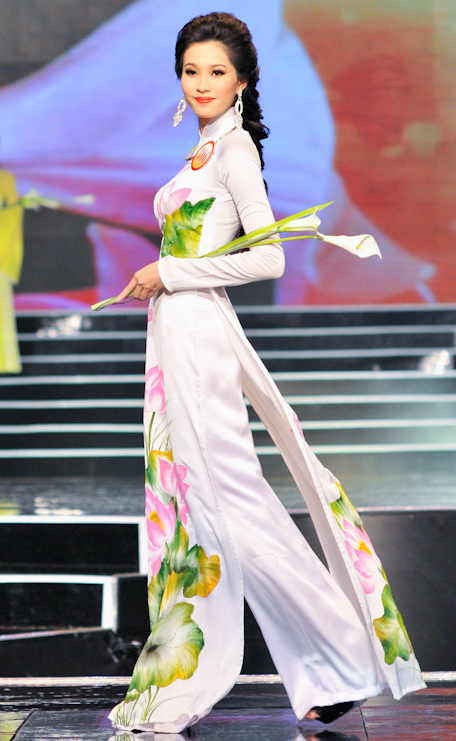
Miss Vietnam 2012
Đặng Thu Thảo

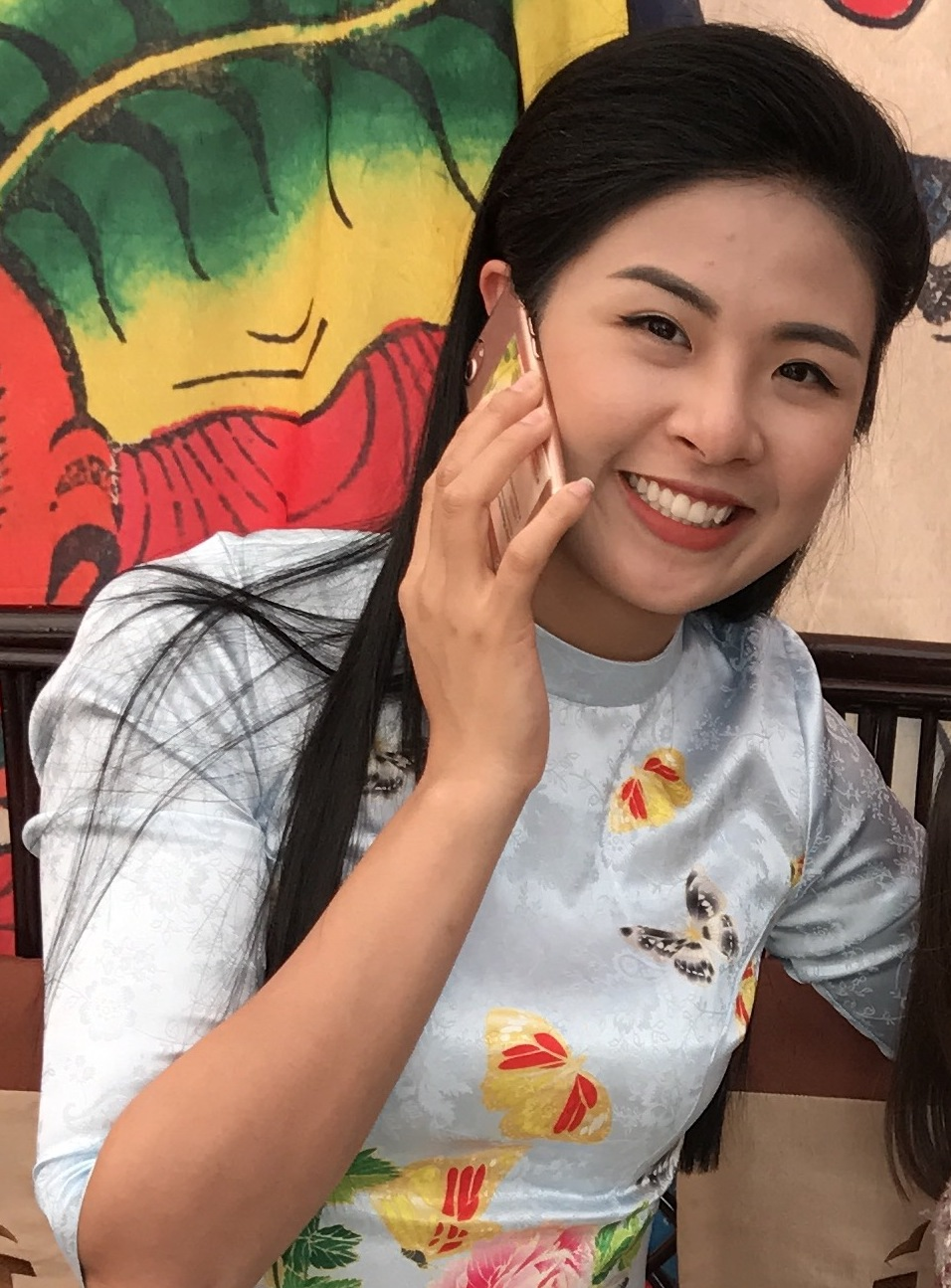
Miss Vietnam 2010
Đặng Thị Ngọc Hân

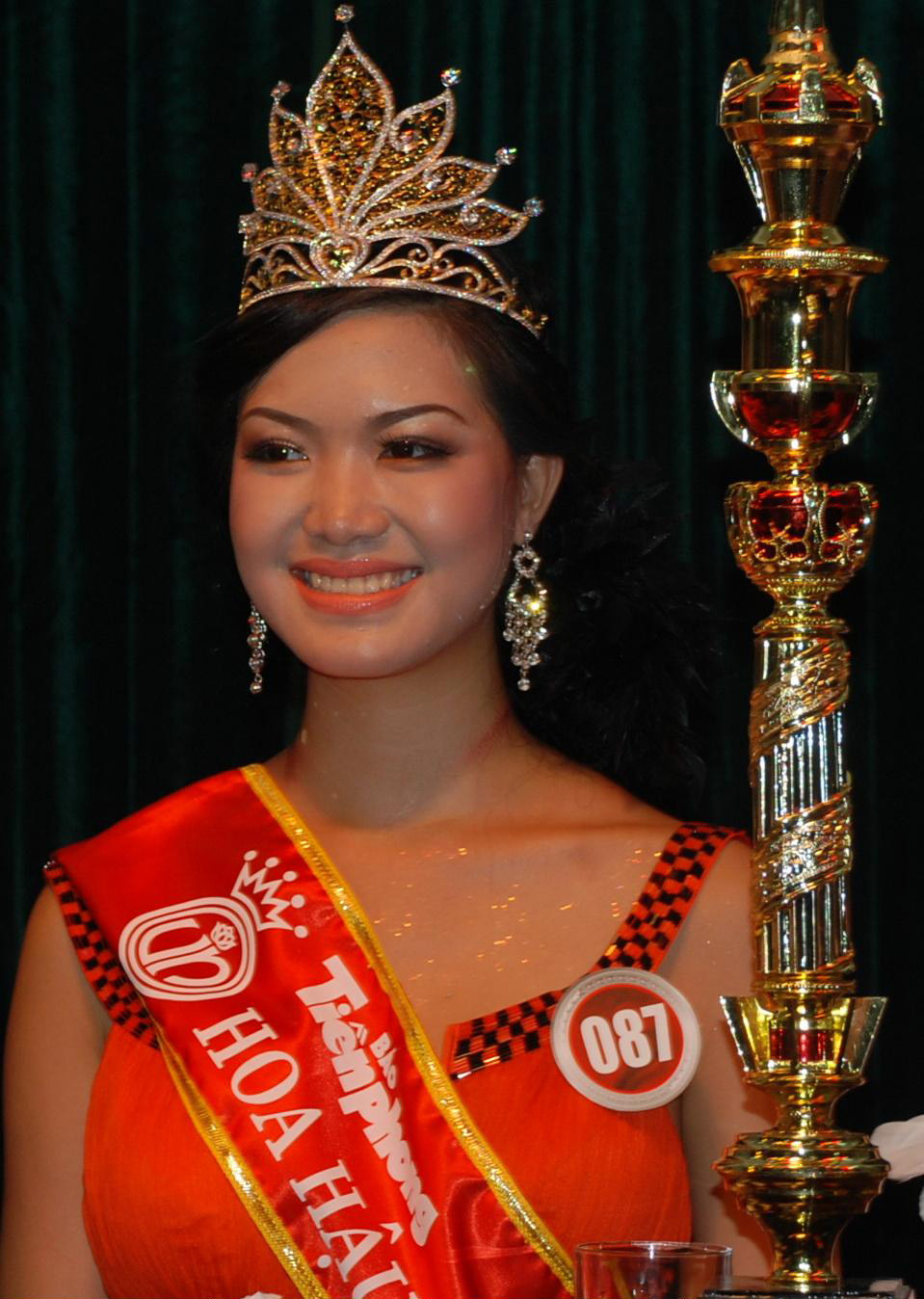
Miss Vietnam 2008
Trần Thị Thùy Dung

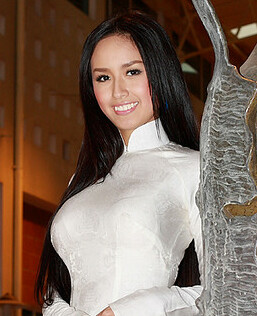
Miss Vietnam 2006
Mai Phương Thúy

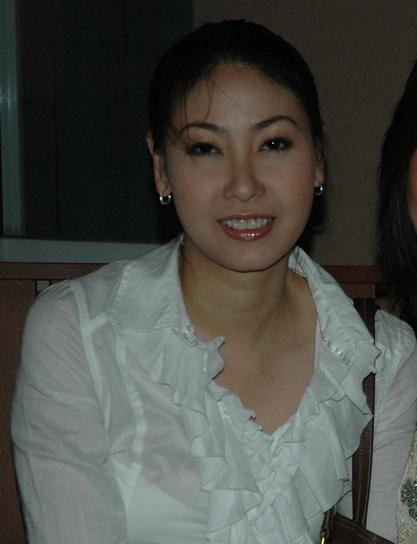
Miss Vietnam 1992
Hà Kiều Anh

== Miss Vietnam at international pageants ==
Vietnam has been represented in the Big Four international beauty pageants, the four major international beauty pageants for women. These are Miss World, Miss Universe, Miss International, and Miss Earth.

Color keys

- : Declared as Winner
- : Ended as Runner-up or Top 4/5
- : Ended as one of the finalists (Top 12/13)
- : Ended as one of the semi-finalists (Top 20/30/40)
- : Ended as special awards winner

=== Miss World ===
Year	Miss World Vietnam	Province	National title	Result	Prize	Ref.
2021	Đỗ Thị Hà	Thanh Hóa province	Miss Vietnam 2020	Top 13	Winner - Digital Challenge	
2018	Trần Tiểu Vy	Quảng Nam province	Miss Vietnam 2018	Top 30		
2017	Đỗ Mỹ Linh	Hanoi	Miss Vietnam 2016	Top 40	Winner - Beauty with a Purpose; Winner - Head-to-Head Challenge	
2014	Nguyễn Cao Kỳ Duyên	Nam Định province	Miss Vietnam 2014	Did not compete		(Note: Due to some bad reputation before, Kỳ Duyên was not allowed to attend Miss World 2014)
2012	Đặng Thu Thảo	Bạc Liêu province	Miss Vietnam 2012	Did not compete		
2010	Đặng Thị Ngọc Hân	Hanoi	Miss Vietnam 2010	Did not compete		(Note: Ngọc Hân twice refused to participate in Miss World 2010 and 2011 for personal reasons.)
2008	Trần Thị Thùy Dung	Da Nang	Miss Vietnam 2008	Did not compete		(Note: Thùy Dung was not allowed to compete in Miss World 2008 because she had not graduated from high school, and no runner-up was approved to compete.)
2006	Mai Phương Thúy	Hanoi	Miss Vietnam 2006	Top 17		
2004	Nguyễn Thị Huyền	Haiphong	Miss Vietnam 2004	Top 15		
2002	Phạm Thị Mai Phương	Haiphong	Miss Vietnam 2002	Top 20		

=== Miss International ===
Year	Miss International Vietnam	Province	National title	Result	Prize	Ref.
2018	Nguyễn Thúc Thùy Tiên	Ho Chi Minh City	Appointed: (Top 5 at Miss Vietnam 2018)	Unplaced		(Note: 2nd Runner-Up Miss Vietnam 2018 Thúy An refused to participate in Miss International 2018 and was replaced by Thùy Tiên, who had the highest score in the top 5.)
2018	Nguyễn Thị Thúy An	Kiên Giang province	Appointed: (2nd Runner-Up Miss Vietnam 2018)	Did not compete		(Note: 2nd Runner-Up Miss Vietnam 2018 Thúy An refused to participate in Miss International 2018 and was replaced by Thùy Tiên, who had the highest score in the top 5.)
2017	Huỳnh Thị Thùy Dung	Ho Chi Minh City	Appointed: (2nd Runner-Up Miss Vietnam 2016)	Unplaced	1 Special Award: Miss Visit Japan Tourism Ambassador	(Note: Initially, 1st Runner-Up Thanh Tú was going to attend Miss International 2017 but she refused, then 2nd Runner-Up Thùy Dung replaced her.)
2017	Ngô Thanh Thanh Tú	Hanoi	Appointed: (1st Runner-Up Miss Vietnam 2016)	Did not compete		(Note: Initially, 1st Runner-Up Thanh Tú was going to attend Miss International 2017 but she refused, then 2nd Runner-Up Thùy Dung replaced her.)

=== Miss Grand International ===
Year	Miss Grand Vietnam	Province	National title	Result	Prize	Ref.
2020	Nguyễn Lê Ngọc Thảo	Ho Chi Minh City	Appointed: (2nd Runner-Up Miss Vietnam 2020)	Top 20		
2018	Bùi Phương Nga	Hanoi	Appointed: (1st Runner-Up Miss Vietnam 2018)	Top 10	Miss Popular Vote	

=== Miss Intercontinental ===
Year	Miss Intercontinental Vietnam	Province	National title	Result	Prize	Ref.
2023	Lê Nguyễn Ngọc Hằng	Ho Chi Minh City	Appointed: (2nd Runner-Up Miss Vietnam 2022)	2nd Runner-Up	1 Special Awards: Miss Intercontinental Asia & Oceania	
2019	Nguyễn Thị Thúy An	Kiên Giang province	Appointed: (2nd Runner-Up Miss Vietnam 2018)	Unplaced		
2003	Bùi Thị Hoàng Oanh	Ho Chi Minh City	Appointed: (1st Runner-Up Miss Vietnam 2002)	Unplaced		

=== World Miss University ===
Year	Vietnam Miss University	Province	National title	Result	Prize	Ref.
1993	Hà Kiều Anh	Ho Chi Minh City	Miss Vietnam 1992	Top 5	1 Special Awards: Miss Taejon	

=== Miss Friendship of the World and Southeast Asia ===
Year	Miss Vietnam	Province	National title	Result	Prize	Ref.
1999	Nguyễn Thiên Nga	Ho Chi Minh City	Miss Vietnam 1999	2nd Runner-Up		

=== Miss International Fashion Egypt ===
Year	Miss Vietnam	Province	National title	Result	Prize	Ref.
1999	Nguyễn Thị Ngọc Khánh	Ho Chi Minh City	Miss Vietnam 1998	1st Runner-Up		

== See also ==
- Miss World Vietnam
- Miss Grand Vietnam
- List of Vietnam representatives at international women beauty pageants
