= Nguyễn Văn Lợi =

Vietnamese linguist (1947–2020)

- Born: June 9, 1947; Nam Định Province, Vietnam
- Died: December 20, 2020 (aged 73); Hanoi, Vietnam
- Occupation: Linguist
- Children: Nguyễn Thu Thủy

Academic background
- Education: University of Hanoi (1970)
- Alma mater: USSR Academy of Sciences (1983)

Academic work
- Institutions: Institute of Linguistics (Viện Ngôn ngữ học), Vietnam Academy of Social Sciences
- Main interests: Linguistics and languages of Vietnam

Nguyễn Văn Lợi (June 9, 1947 – December 20, 2020) was a Vietnamese linguist who served as the deputy director of the Institute of Linguistics (Vietnamese: Viện Ngôn ngữ học) at the Vietnam Academy of Social Sciences.

== Early life ==
Nguyễn was born on June 9, 1947, in Nam Định Province, Vietnam.

== Education and career ==
From 1966 to 1970, Nguyễn studied linguistics at the Department of Literature of the University of Hanoi. In 1970, started working at the Institute of Linguistics of the Vietnam Social Sciences Committee (now the Vietnam Academy of Social Sciences). At the Institute of Linguistics, he did research on ethnic minority languages in Vietnam.

Nguyễn did his graduate studies at the Institute of Oriental Studies of the USSR Academy of Sciences from 1979 and 1983, where he wrote a dissertation on historical phonetics and Hmong dialects. He then returned to work at the Institute of Linguistics in Hanoi.

From 1995 to 2005, Nguyễn was the deputy director of the Institute of Linguistics in Hanoi. He became Professor in 1996. He worked at the Institute of Dictionaries and Encyclopedias of Vietnam from 2008 to 2012. Nguyễn died on December 20, 2020, in Hanoi, Vietnam shortly after presenting at a linguistics conference.

== Academic interests ==
Nguyễn's primary academic research interests were:

- historical linguistics
- historical phonology
- linguistic typology
- language ecology and language policy

== Personal life ==
His daughter was Nguyễn Thu Thủy, who won the 4th Miss Vietnam beauty pageant in 1994.

== Selected publications ==
=== Books ===
- 1993. Tiếng Rục (The Ruc language). Hà Nội: Nhà xuất bản Khoa học Xã hội.
- 1998. Tiếng Katu (The Katu language). Hà Nội: Nhà xuất bản Khoa học Xã hội. (co-authored with Nguyễn Hữu Hoành)
- 2006. Ngữ pháp tiếng Cơ Tu (Katu grammar). Sở Khoa Học Và Công Nghệ Quảng Nam. (co-authored with Nguyễn Hữu Hoành and Tạ Văn Thông)
- 2008. Tiếng Mảng (The Mang language). Hà Nội: Nhà xuất bản Khoa học Xã hội. (co-authored with Nguyễn Hữu Hoành and Tạ Văn Thông)
- 2011. Gelao languages: Materials on the comparative vocabulary of the Kadai languages (in Russian). Moscow: Academia. (co-authored with I.V. Samarina, O.M. Mazo, Nguyễn Hữu Hoành)
- 2018. Ngữ pháp tiếng Hmông (Hmong grammar). Thái Nguyên, Vietnam: Nhà xuất bản Đại học Thái Nguyên. (co-authored with Lý Thị Hoa)

=== Articles ===
- 1993. Tộc danh của một số dân tộc ở Nam Trung Quốc và Đông Nam Á. Vấn đề tên gọi Giao Chỉ [Ethonyms of some ethnicities in southern China and Southeast Asia: the question of the name Giao Chi]. Việt Nam, những vấn đề ngôn ngữ và văn hóa, Hội Ngôn ngữ học Việt Nam, Hà Nội, 35–44.
- 1994. Cách cấu tạo các từ chỉ thời gian (ngày, năm) trong một số ngôn ngữ nhóm Ka Tu và Việt Mường [Methods of forming time expressions (days, years) in some Katuic and Viet-Muong languages]. Nghiên Cứu Ngôn Ngữ Các Dân Tộc Ở Việt Nam, 94–118. Hanoi: Nhà Xuất Bản Khoa Học Xã Hội.
- 2004. Quan hệ Cao Lan, Sán Chỉ xét về mặt ngôn ngữ [The relationship between Cao Lan and San Chi as seen through language]. Tạp Chí Dân tộc học (2004) 3:48-60.
- 2005. Thanh điệu và nguồn gốc thanh điệu trong ngôn ngữ Chơ Lảo [Tones and the origin of tones in the Cholao language]. Hội thảo quốc tế Ngôn ngữ học liên Á lần thứ VI, 181–201. Hà Nội: Nhà xuất bản Khoa học Xã hội.
- 2008. Các ngôn ngữ nhánh Việt (Vietic) và vấn đề nguồn gốc tên gọi Cửu Chân [Languages of the Vietic branch and the problem of the origin of the name Cuu Chan]. Tạp chí Khoa học Xã hội miền Trung (2008) 1:26 - 34
- 2008. Vấn đề quan hệ ngôn ngữ tộc người các nhóm Pa cô, Ta ôi Việt Nam [The question of the linguistic relationship of the Pacoh and Taoih ethnic groups]. Tạp chí Khoa học Xã hội miền Trung (2008) 2:37-45.
- 2008. Tí (Chuột) trong hệ thập nhị chi và một số vấn đề tiền sử ngôn ngữ Đông Nam Á [‘Mouse’ in the twelve-branch system and some questions of the linguistic prehistory in Southeast Asia]. Tạp chí Khoa học Xã hội miền Trung (2008) 3:41-46.
- 2011. Câu chuyện “Mão: Mèo hay Thỏ” và vấn đề tiếp xúc văn hóa ngôn ngữ các dân tộc phương Đông [The story "Rabbit: Cat or Rabbit" and the issue of cultural and linguistic contact among ethnic groups in East Asia]. Tạp chí Từ điển học và Bách khoa thư (2011) 2: 4–11.
- 2011. Việc phát hiện loài sinh vật "hóa thạch sống" ở Quảng Bình: Từ góc nhìn ngôn ngữ học [The discovery of "living fossil" creatures in Quang Binh: From a linguistic perspective]. Tạp chí Từ điển học và Bách khoa thư (2011) 6: 83–88.
- 2014. GS TSKH Nina Vasilievna Solnceva - Chuyên gia nổi tiếng về các ngôn ngữ Phương Đông [Professor Nina Vasilievna Solnceva: A renowned expert on languages of the East]. Tạp chí Từ điển học và Bách khoa thư (2014) 2: 123–125.
- 2019. Tones in the Cuoi language of Tan Ki district in Nghe An province, Vietnam. Journal of the Southeast Asian Linguistics Society 12.1: lvii-lxvi. (co-authored with Nguyen Huu Hoanh).
- 2020. Cơ tầng Chăm trong tiếng Quảng Bình (Trên cơ sở tư liệu về thanh điệu một số thổ ngữ ở Quảng Bình) [The Chamic substrate in the Quang Binh language (Based on tone data of some dialects in Quang Binh province)]. Hội thảo ngôn ngữ học quốc tế lần thứ IV, ngày 20 tháng 12 năm 2020, iclv-2020, Hà Nội.

Articles published in Ngôn ngữ:

- 1973. Thêm một số tư liệu về quan hệ giữa các ngôn ngữ Mèo-Dao và Môn-Khơme [Some data on the relation between Miao-Yao and Mon-Khmer languages. Ngôn ngữ (1973) 1:5-15.
- 1984. Vai trò của cứ liệu lịch sử trong miêu tả âm vị học (về các tiêu chí âm vị học của phụ âm tiên mũi tiêng Hmông) [The role of historical data in the phonological description (on the phonological criterion of the prenasalized consonants in the language Hmong]. Ngôn ngữ (1984) 4:46-51.
- 1987. Loại hình học đồng đại và lịch đại: hiện tượng tiền mũi trong các ngôn ngữ Đông Nam A [Diachronic and synchronic typology: prenasalization in Southeast Asian languages]. Ngôn ngữ (1987) 1-2:36-47.
- 1988. Sự hình thành đối lập đường nét thanh điệu bằng/không bằng trong các ngôn ngữ Viêt-Mường (trên tư liệu tiếng Arem và Rục) [The formation of the opposition of melodic contour between level and unlevel (unidirectional) tones in Viet-Muong languages (data from Arem and Rue). Ngôn ngữ (1988) 2:3-9.
- 1991. Về quá trình hình thành sự đối lập âm vực thanh điệu trong các ngôn ngữ Việt Mường [On the formation of the oppositions of Viet-Muong tone registers]. Ngôn ngữ (1991) 1:49-59.
- 1992. Trung tố cấu tạo danh từ Proto Việt-Mường và dấu vết của chúng trong tiêng Việt hiện đại [Noun forming infixes in Proto Viet-Muong and their traces in modern Vietnamese language]. Ngôn ngữ (1992) 2:29-36.
- 1994. Sinh thái ngôn ngữ và sự phát triển xã hội [Language ecology and social development]. Ngôn ngữ (1994) 4:40-46.
- 1997. Thanh điệu và chất giọng (voice quality) trong tiếng Việt hiện đại (phương ngữ Bắc Bộ): khảo sát thực nghiệm [The tones and voice quality in modern northern Vietnamese: instrumental case studies]. Ngôn ngữ (1997) 1:1-16 (co-authored with Jerold A. Edmondson).
- 1998. Paul King Benedict-Nhà nghiên cứu các ngôn ngữ Đông Nam A [Paul King Benedict-The researcher of Southeast Asian languages]. Ngôn ngữ (1998) 3:1-8.
- 1998. Vị trí của tiếng Mảng trong các ngôn ngữ Mon-Khmer [The position of Mang language in the Mon-Khmer languages]. Ngôn ngữ (1998) 3:45-55. (co-authored with Nguyễn Hữu Hoành and Tạ Văn Thông).
- 2000. V.M. Solntsev nhà ngôn ngữ học lớn, chuyên gia hàng đầu về các ngôn ngữ phương Đông [V.M. Solntsev, a great linguist, a top expert on Eastern languages]. Ngôn ngữ (2000) 6:17-24.
- 2002. Thanh điệu một vài thổ ngữ Nghệ An, từ góc nhìn đông đại và lịch đại [Tones of some subdialects in Nghe An from synchronic and diachronic views]. Ngôn ngữ (2002) 3:1-12.
