= Miss Vietnam 2010 =

Vietnamese beauty pageant

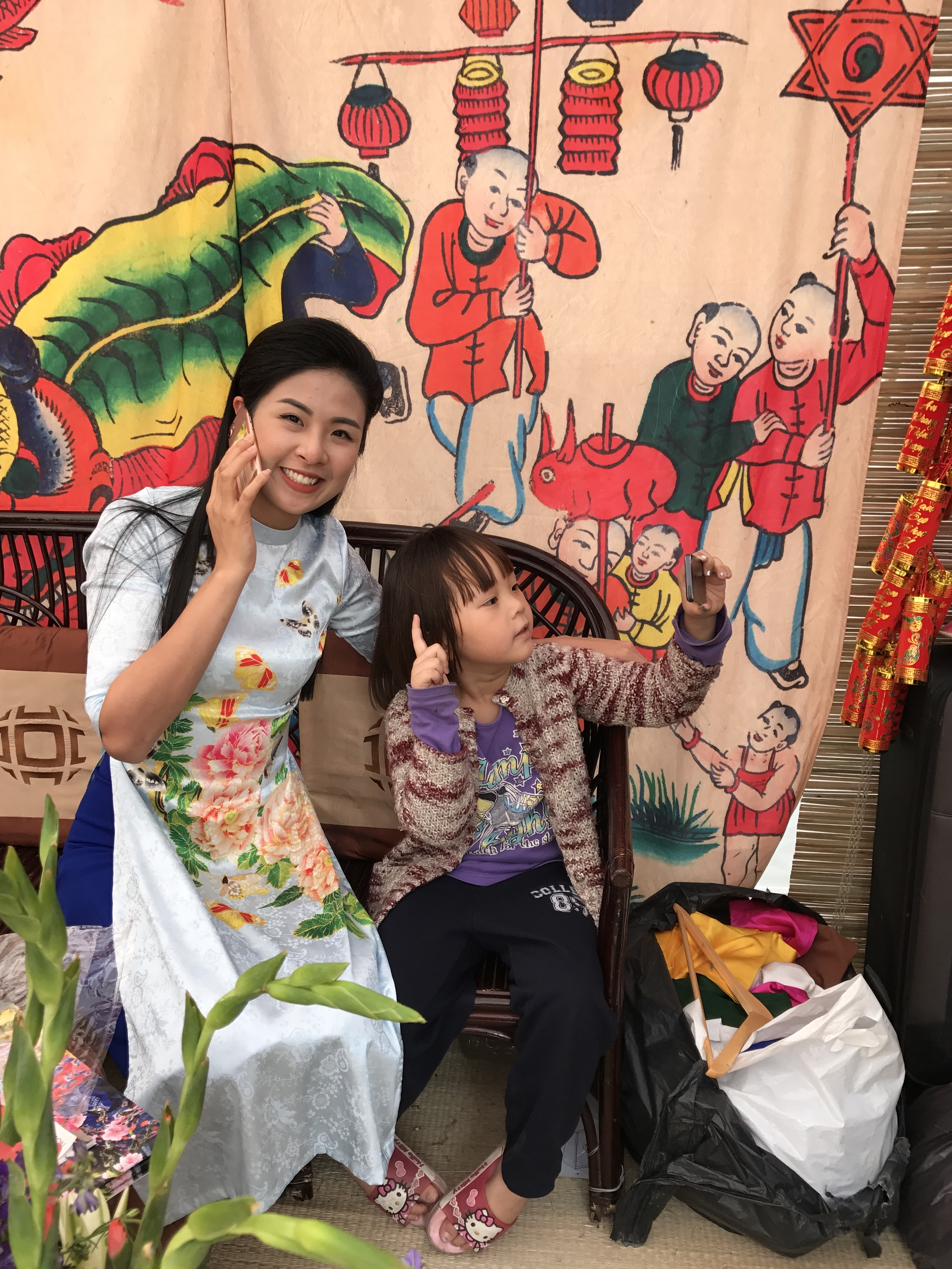
- Miss Vietnam 2010 Ngọc Hân and child
- Date: November 6, 2010
- Presenters: Ngô Mỹ Uyên; Anh Tuấn
- Entertainment: Đàm Vĩnh Hưng, Hồ Ngọc Hà, Mỹ Tâm, Đức Tuấn
- Venue: Water Show Amphitheater, Tuần Châu, Quảng Ninh, Vietnam
- Broadcaster: VTC
- Entrants: 37
- Placements: 20
- Winner: Đặng Thị Ngọc Hân; Hanoi

Miss Vietnam 2010 (Vietnamese: Hoa hậu Việt Nam 2010) was the 12th edition of the Miss Vietnam pageant. It was held on November 6, 2010, at Water Show Amphitheater, Tuần Châu, Quảng Ninh, Vietnam. Đặng Thị Ngọc Hân from Hanoi was crowned Miss Vietnam 2010.

== Results ==
=== Placements ===
Color keys

- Declared as the winner in an International pageant.
- Ended as Runner-up in an International pageant.
- Ended as finalist or semi-finalist in an International pageant.
- Unplaced.

Final result	Contestant
Miss Vietnam 2010	516 – Đặng Thị Ngọc Hân
1st Runner-up	298 – Vũ Thị Hoàng My
2nd Runner-up	189 – Đặng Thùy Trang
Top 5	434 – Nguyễn Thị Loan; 480 – Nguyễn Bảo Ngọc
Top 10	298 – Nguyễn Phước Hạnh; 390 – Vũ Thị Bình Minh; 508 – Trương Tùng Lan; 569 – Phí Thị Thùy Linh; 990 – Vũ Thu Hà
Top 20	58 – Lê Nhã Uyên; 75 – Tôn Nữ Na Uy; 139 – Nguyễn Thị Ngọc Tuyết; 269 – Lê Thu Huyền Trang; 289 – Lê Huỳnh Thúy Ngân; 294 – Đặng Hà Thu; 574 – Đàm Thu Trang; 595 – Huỳnh Bích Phương; 806 – Phạm Thị Huyền Trang; 809 – Nguyễn Phạm Bích Trâm

=== Special awards ===
Special Award	Contestant
Best Face	595 – Huỳnh Bích Phương
Miss Beach	434 – Nguyễn Thị Loan
Miss Talent	595 – Nguyễn Phạm Bích Trâm
Miss Congeniality	480 – Nguyễn Bảo Ngọc
Miss Popular Vote	595 – Huỳnh Bích Phương

== Contestants ==
37 contestants in the final.

Contestants	No.	Hometown
Northern Region
Cung Thanh Ngọc Anh	142	—N/a
Phạm Thùy Dương	01	—N/a
Vũ Thị Thùy Dương	534	—N/a
Vũ Thu Hà	990	—N/a
Nguyễn Phước Hạnh	298	—N/a
Đặng Thị Ngọc Hân	516	Hà Nội
Đào Thị Hân	698	—N/a
Đỗ Thị Hương	876	—N/a
Trương Tùng Lan	508	—N/a
Phí Thị Thùy Linh	569	—N/a
Nguyễn Thị Loan	434	Thái Bình
Nguyễn Thị Minh	699	—N/a
Tôn Nữ Na Uy	75	—N/a
Trần Thị Hoài Phương	206	—N/a
Đặng Thị Phượng	580	—N/a
Nguyễn Thị Ngọc Tuyết	139	—N/a
Đặng Hà Thu	294	—N/a
Đặng Thùy Trang	189	—N/a
Đàm Thị Thu Trang	574	—N/a
Lê Thu Huyền Trang	269	—N/a
Phạm Thị Huyền Trang	806	—N/a
Lê Nhã Uyên	58	—N/a
Southern Region
Trần Thị Ngọc Giàu	198	—N/a
Huỳnh Thị Lệ Hằng	278	—N/a
Lê Thị Thúy Hằng	309	—N/a
Nguyễn Thị Mai Ly	379	—N/a
Vũ Thị Bình Minh	390	—N/a
Vũ Thị Hoàng My	298	Đồng Nai
Nguyễn Bảo Ngọc	480	—N/a
Lê Huỳnh Thúy Ngân	289	Tiền Giang
Võ Thị Ánh Nguyệt	489	—N/a
Lê Thị Nhàn	498	—N/a
Hồ Thị Cẩm Nhung	518	—N/a
Huỳnh Bích Phương	595	—N/a
Đào Mai Uyên Thảo	695	—N/a
Lâm Thị Thúy	727	—N/a
Nguyễn Phạm Bích Trâm	809	Đồng Nai
