= Ngọc Hân =

Beauty pageant winner

Đặng Thị Ngọc Hân
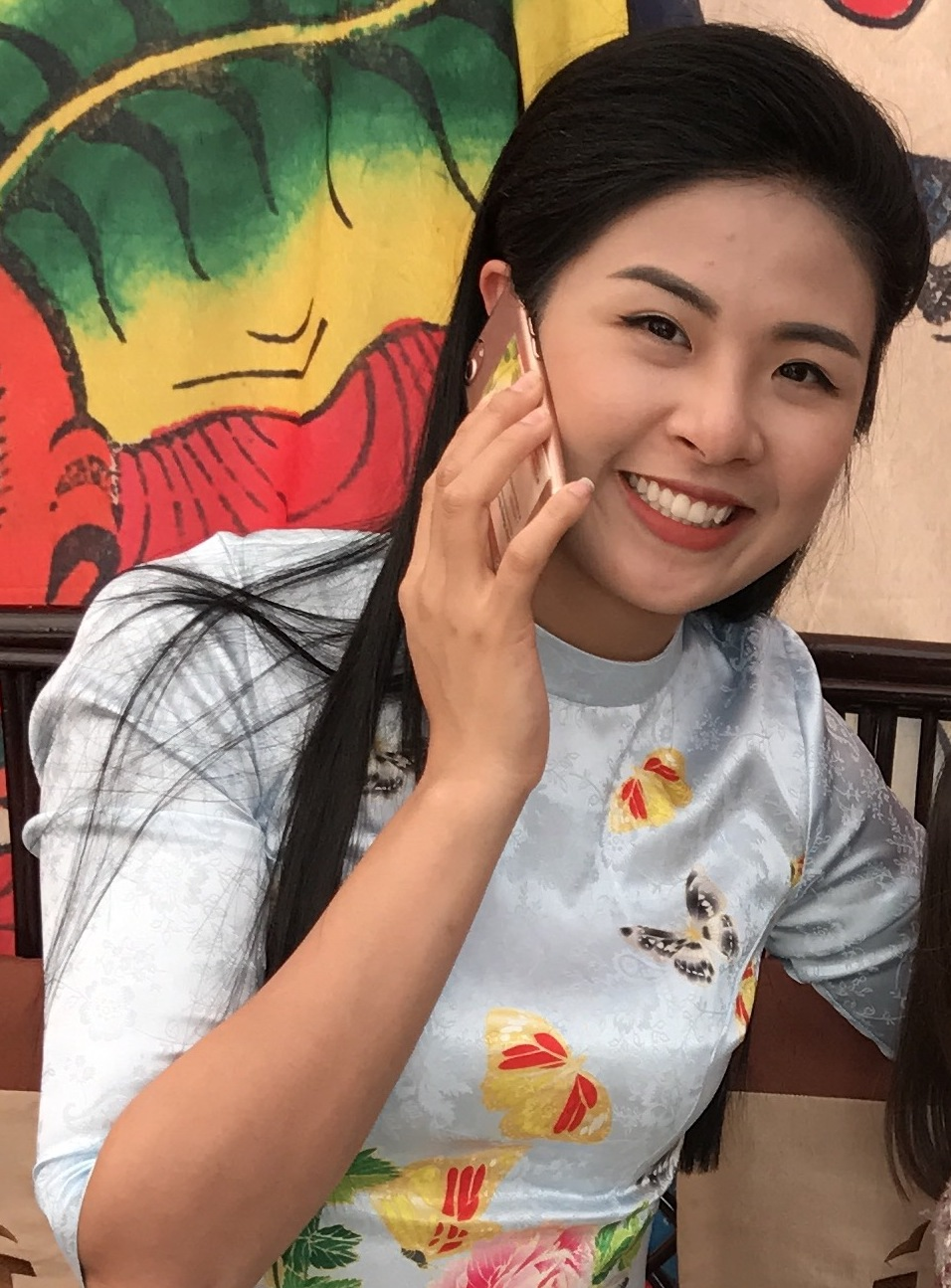
- Born: March 11, 1989 (age 37); Hanoi, Vietnam
- Beauty pageant titleholder
- Title: Miss Vietnam 2010
- Hair color: Black
- Eye color: Brown
- Major competition: Miss Vietnam 2010

Đặng Thị Ngọc Hân (born 11 March 1989 in Hanoi, Vietnam) is the winner of the 2010 Miss Vietnam. pageant that takes place in Tuần Châu, Quảng Ninh on August 14, 2010.

== Career ==
She started to model at the age of 16 and had become a familiar face on the runway in Hanoi. She has been awarded: Most photogenic Vietnamese model in 2006, Miss Icon Student 2005, First prize of product program Yomost, and Most beautiful female student at Tran nhan Tong High School.

== Personal life ==
On December 10, 2022, Ngoc Han married her boyfriend, Pham Phu Dat. Their wedding was held in a traditional Vietnamese cultural style.

Awards and achievements
Preceded by Trần Thị Thùy Dung	Miss Vietnam; 2010	Succeeded by Đặng Thu Thảo
