= Hợp Đức =

Hợp Đức may refer to several places in Vietnam, including:

- Hợp Đức, Haiphong, a ward of Đồ Sơn District
- Hợp Đức, Bắc Giang, a commune of Tân Yên District
- Hợp Đức, Hải Dương, a commune of Thanh Hà District
