= Nguyễn Thị Huyền =

Nguyễn Thị Huyền may refer to:

- Nguyễn Thị Huyền (athlete) (b. 1993), Vietnamese runner
- Nguyễn Thị Huyền (Miss Vietnam) (b. 1985), 2004 Miss Vietnam
