= Do Son Airfield =

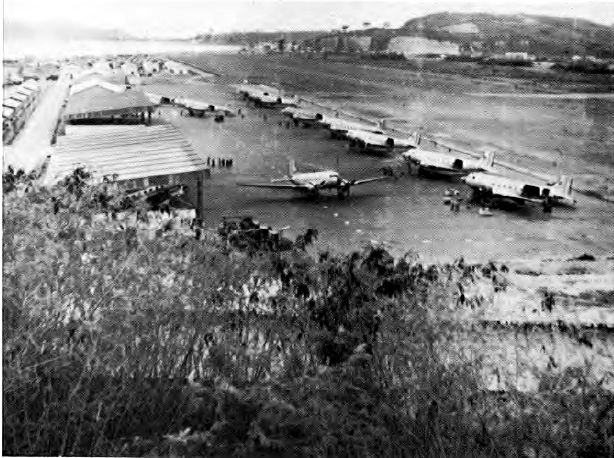
- C-47s at Do Son, 1954
- IATA: none; ICAO: none

Summary
- Airport type: Military
- Location: Đồ Sơn
- Coordinates: 20.714°N 106.797°E
- Interactive map of Do Son Airfield

Runways
Direction	Length		Surface
Direction	ft	m	Surface
	2,640	805	Marston Mat

Do Son Airfield is a disused military airfield in Đồ Sơn, Vietnam. It was constructed during the French colonial period and was used by the French Air Force during the First Indochina War.

== History ==
Do Son was described United States Air Force (USAF) General Otto P. Weyland as being "a very poor strip" only 2,640 feet (800 m), covered with steel planking.

On 3 February 1954 in a raid on the airfield the Viet Minh destroyed three C–47 Skytrains loaned to the French by the USAF and significantly damaged a fourth.

On 5 February 1954 the USAF 6424th Air Depot Wing of Far East Air Logistics Force deployed two maintenance and supply detachments to Do Son and Tourane Air Base, the Do Son detachment supported the C-47s and closed on 29 June.

On 6 March due to increased Viet Minh activity in the area the French ordered the evacuation of the entire civilian population of Đồ Sơn, which was approximately 23,000 people. At approximately 22:30 on 15 March a Viet Minh force estimated at 400 cut the road from Đồ Sơn to Haiphong and Cat Bi airfield. The USAF site commander at the airfield, Maj. Kenneth Knox, armed the USAF mechanics there and had them stand guard at the airfield and along the beach. General Trapnell, the MAAG commander, flew to the base the following day to assess the safety of the airmen, he was "not pleased with the lack of French ground forces." Trapnell requested that French commander General Henri Navarre send an additional company to reinforce the Do Son garrison and indicated that he would move the airmen to Tourane if the French could not protect them.

Following their defeat of the French forces in the Battle of Dien Bien Phu, the main Viet Minh force at Dien Bien Phu began its march toward the Red River Delta area around Hanoi. On 19 May the 315th Troop Carrier Wing sent four C–46 Commandos and crews to Do Son to be on standby in case of emergency evacuation. On 27 May, the planes began daily courier flights to Tourane.

On 14 June a C–46 flown by USAF personnel crashed after its landing gear struck the seawall on the approach at Do Son. The crew sustained no significant injuries, but the aircraft was destroyed.

On 29 June the USAF 6424th Air Depot Wing detachment that had supported French C–47 operations departed from Do Son.
