= Miss Vietnam 2006 =

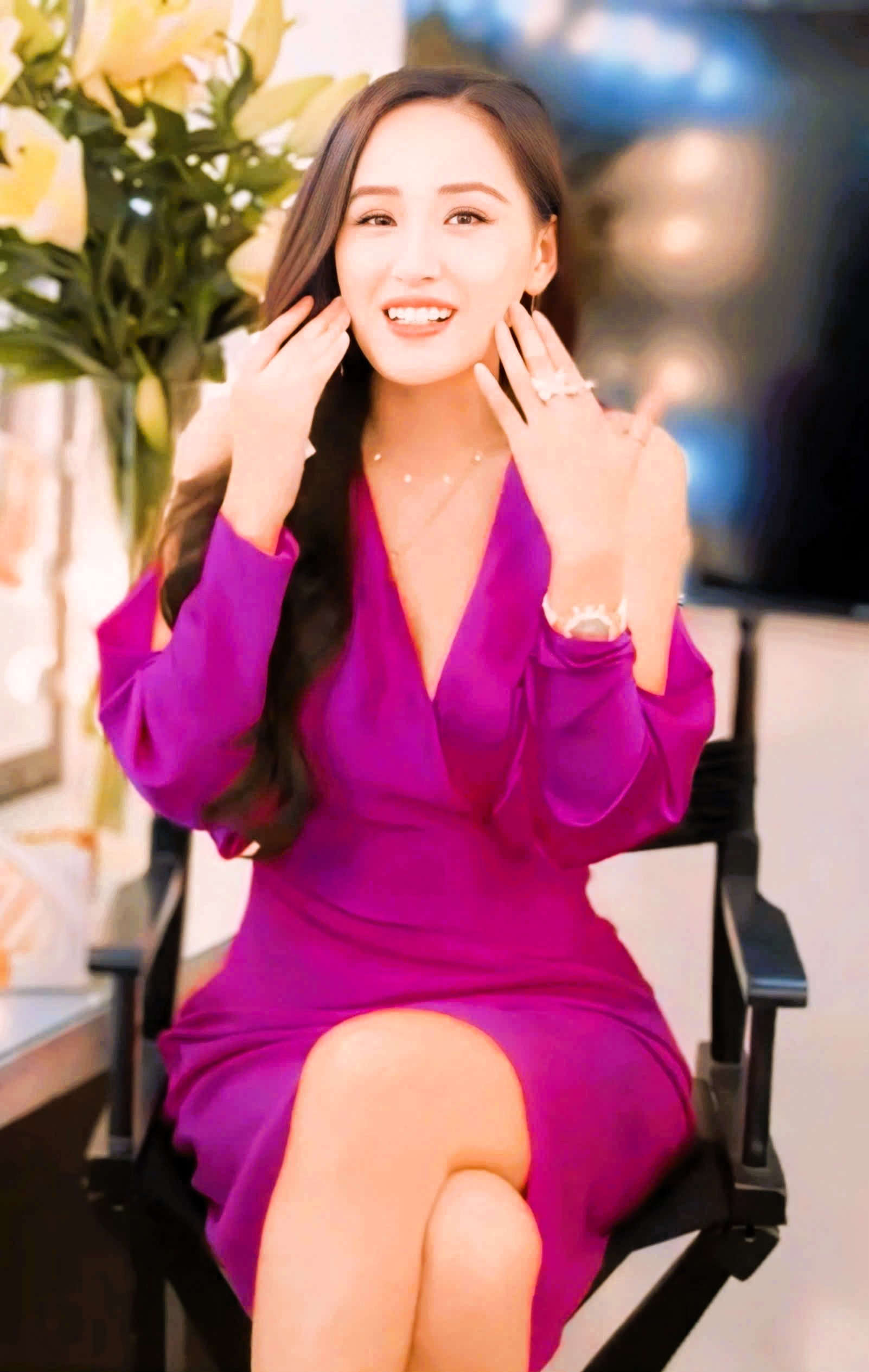
- Miss Vietnam 2006 Mai Phương Thúy
- Date: August 26, 2006
- Presenters: Anh Tuấn; Nguyễn Thị Ngọc Khánh
- Entertainment: Thu Minh, AC&M, Mỹ Tâm, Thái Văn Dũng, Mặt trời đỏ, Kasim Hoàng Vũ
- Venue: Vinpearl Land, Nha Trang, Khánh Hòa province
- Broadcaster: VTV
- Entrants: 34
- Placements: 10
- Winner: Mai Phương Thúy; Hanoi

Miss Vietnam 2006 (Vietnamese: Hoa hậu Việt Nam 2006) was the 10th edition of the Miss Vietnam pageant. It was held on 26 August 2006 at Vinpearl Land, Nha Trang, Khánh Hòa province. Mai Phương Thúy from Hanoi was crowned Miss Vietnam 2006.

== Results ==
=== Placements ===
Final result	Contestant
Miss Vietnam 2006	Mai Phương Thúy
1st Runner-Up	Lưu Bảo Anh
2nd Runner-Up	Lương Thị Ngọc Lan
Top 5	Phạm Thúy Trang; Nguyễn Thị Ngọc Anh
Top 10	K'The; Trần Thanh Loan; Cao Thanh Hằng; Trần Thị Hương Giang; Phạm Thị Thùy Dương

=== Special awards ===
Special Award	Contestant
Miss Photo	Cao Thanh Hằng
Miss Sea	Hoàng Lệ Trang
Miss Congeniality	K'The
Miss Fitness	Đàm Thị Lý

== Contestants ==
34 contestants in the final.

Contestants	Height	Homet
Lưu Bảo Anh		
Mai Hải Anh		
Nguyễn Thị Ngọc Anh		
Hoàng Ngọc Bích		
Phạm Thị Thùy Dương	1m74	Ninh Bình
Lê Thị Phương Giang		
Trần Thị Hương Giang		Hải Dương
Nguyễn Thu Hà		Hà Nội
Cao Thanh Hằng		
Nguyễn Thị Thanh Hoa		
Đỗ Thị Lan Hương		
Lê Thu Hương		
K'The		
Lương Thị Ngọc Lan		
Vi Thị Lan		
Đặng Huyền Lâm		
Phạm Thị Thanh Loan		
Trần Thanh Loan		
Đàm Thị Lý		
Vũ Thị Mai		
Nguyễn Ngọc Minh		
Nguyễn Ngọc Thùy Nga		
Nguyễn Thu Nga		
Trịnh Thị Kim Phượng		
Trần Thị Quỳnh		Hải Phòng
Phạm Tâm Thanh		
Trần Thị Kim Thanh		Vĩnh Phúc
Nguyễn Thị Hồng Thắm		
Mai Phương Thúy		Hà Nội
Hoàng Lệ Trang		
Phạm Thúy Trang		
Trần Diễm Trinh		
Nguyễn Thị Tuyết Vân		
Nguyễn Thị Tú Yên		
