= Miss Vietnam 2022 =

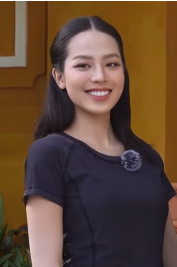
- Miss Vietnam 2022 Huỳnh Thị Thanh Thủy
- Date: December 23, 2022
- Presenters: Nguyên Khang; Quỳnh Châu (Preliminary); Mai Phương; Vũ Mạnh Cường; Lương Thùy Linh (Final)
- Entertainment: Sofia; Mai Tiến Dũng; Lưu Hiền Trinh; Shin Hồng Vịnh (Preliminary); Quân A.P; Lona; Kay Trần; Hoàng Thùy Linh (Final)
- Venue: Phu Tho Indoor Stadium, District 11 Ho Chi Minh City
- Broadcaster: VTV2
- Entrants: 58
- Placements: 20
- Winner: Huỳnh Thị Thanh Thủy; Da Nang

Miss Vietnam 2022 was the 18th Miss Vietnam pageant, held at the Phu Tho Indoor Stadium in Ho Chi Minh City, Vietnam, on December 23, 2022.

Miss Vietnam 2020 Đỗ Thị Hà crowned her successor Huỳnh Thị Thanh Thủy at the end of the event.

== Results ==
=== Placements ===
Color keys

- Declared as the winner in an International pageant.
- Ended as Runner-up in an International pageant.
- Ended as finalist or semifinalist in an International pageant.
- Unplaced.

Placement	Contestant	International pagent	International placement
Miss Vietnam 2022	005 – Huỳnh Thị Thanh Thủy	Miss International 2024	Winner
1st Runner-Up	146 – Trịnh Thùy Linh		
2nd Runner-Up	166 – Lê Nguyễn Ngọc Hằng	Miss Intercontinental 2023	2nd Runner-Up
Top 5	122 – Nguyễn Ngọc Mai; 177 – Hoàng Hương Giang		
Top 10	088 – Đinh Khánh Hòa; 114 – Phạm Giáng My; 216 – Trần Thị Bé Quyên; 252 – Trần Lê Mai Chi		
Top 10	378 – Phan Phương Oanh	Miss World 2027	TBD
Top 20	010 – Bùi Thảo Linh; 093 – Nguyễn Phương Anh; 101 – Phạm Thị Hồng Thắm; 106 – Nguyễn Thu Hà; 121 – Lê Thanh Trúc; 234 – Đỗ Trần Ngọc Thảo; 323 – Nguyễn Thị Thanh Tâm; 369 – Hồ Thị Yến Nhi; 400 – Lê Minh Anh §; 445 – Trần Nguyễn Phương Thy		

§ - People's Choice winner

=== Special awards ===
Giải thưởng	Thí sinh
Miss Áo dài	216 - Trần Thị Bé Quyên
Best Skin	146 - Trịnh Thùy Linh
Best Face	177 - Hoàng Hương Giang

== Fast Track Events ==
=== Beauty With A Purpose ===
The winner of Beauty With A Purpose would automatically advance to Top 5

Final result	Contestant
Winner	122 – Nguyễn Ngọc Mai
Top 5	005 – Huỳnh Thị Thanh Thủy; 088 – Đinh Khánh Hòa; 323 – Nguyễn Thị Thanh Tâm; 378 – Phan Phương Oanh
Top 18	052 – Trần Lê Mai Chi; 057 – Nguyễn Linh Thu; 081 – Trần Gia Hân; 101 – Phạm Thị Hồng Thắm; 121 – Lê Thanh Trúc; 146 – Trịnh Thùy Linh; 166 – Lê Nguyễn Ngọc Hằng; 177 – Hoàng Hương Giang; 182 – Mai Trang Thảo; 234 – Đỗ Trần Ngọc Thảo; 278 – Nguyễn Thị Phương Nhung; 335 – Nguyễn Ngọc Tường Vi; 426 – Trịnh Mỹ Anh

=== Beach Beauty ===
Final result	Contestant
Winner	378 – Phan Phương Oanh
Top 3	146 – Trịnh Thùy Linh; 216 – Trần Thị Bé Quyên

=== Multimedia ===
Final result	Contestant
Winner	323 – Nguyễn Thị Thanh Tâm
Top 3	122 – Nguyễn Ngọc Mai; 278 – Nguyễn Thị Phương Nhung
Top 6	005 – Huỳnh Thị Thanh Thủy; 088 – Đinh Khánh Hòa; 378 – Phan Phương Oanh
Top 7	045 – Nguyễn Thị Hoài Ngọc

=== Top Model ===
Final result	Contestant
Winner	052 – Trần Lê Mai Chi
Top 3	066 – Phan Thị Sen; 369 – Hồ Thị Yến Nhi

=== Talent ===
Final result	Contestant
Winner	166 – Lê Nguyễn Ngọc Hằng
Top 3	081 – Trần Gia Hân; 177 – Hoàng Hương Giang

=== Sports ===
Final result	Contestant
Winner	005 - Huỳnh Thị Thanh Thủy
Top 3	093 – Nguyễn Phương Anh; 166 – Lê Nguyễn Ngọc Hằng
Top 8	045 – Nguyễn Thị Hoài Ngọc; 088 – Đinh Khánh Hòa; 119 – Phạm Thị Phương Trinh; 369 – Hồ Thị Yến Nhi; 426 – Trịnh Mỹ Anh

== Contestants ==
35 contestants in the final

No.	Contestants
005	Huỳnh Thị Thanh Thủy
010	Bùi Thảo Linh
045	Nguyễn Thị Hoài Ngọc
052	Trần Lê Mai Chi
057	Nguyễn Linh Thu
066	Phan Thị Sen
081	Trần Gia Hân
088	Đinh Khánh Hòa
093	Nguyễn Phương Anh
101	Phạm Thị Hồng Thắm
106	Nguyễn Thu Hà
108	Lê Thị Hồng Điễm
114	Phạm Giáng My
119	Phạm Thị Phương Trinh
121	Lê Thanh Trúc
122	Nguyễn Ngọc Mai
146	Trịnh Thùy Linh
166	Lê Nguyễn Ngọc Hằng
177	Hoàng Hương Giang
182	Mai Trang Thảo
215	Phạm Thị Nhung
216	Trần Thị Bé Quyên
228	Nguyễn Hoàng Yến
232	Bùi Thị Hoàng Yến
234	Đỗ Trần Ngọc Thảo
245	Nguyễn Lê Nhật Quỳnh
278	Nguyễn Thị Phương Nhung
323	Nguyễn Thị Thanh Tâm
335	Nguyễn Ngọc Tường Vi
369	Hồ Thị Yến Nhi
378	Phan Phương Oanh
400	Lê Minh Anh
426	Trịnh Mỹ Anh
445	Trần Nguyễn Phương Thy
462	Trần Thị Hồng Nhung

== Judges ==
The Miss Vietnam 2022 final judges were:

- Lê Xuân Sơn - Editor-in-chief of Tien Phong newspaper
- Trần Hữu Việt - Member of Executive Committee and Head of Young Writers' Committee of Vietnam Writers Association, Head of Culture and Arts Department of Nhan Dan newspaper
- Nguyễn Xuân Bắc - Actor, Director of Vietnam Drama Theater
- Lê Thanh Hòa - Fashion designer and stylist
- Nguyễn Thụy Vân - 2nd Runner-up of Miss Vietnam 2008
- Trần Tiểu Vy - Miss Vietnam 2018
- Lê Nguyễn Bảo Ngọc - Miss Intercontinental 2022.
