= Nguyễn Thiên Nga =

Vietnamese beauty pageant contestant (born 1975)

- Born: Nguyễn Thiên Nga; 1975 (age 50–51); Saigon, Vietnam
- Height: 5 ft 7 in (1.70 m)
- Beauty pageant titleholder
- Title: Miss Vietnam 1996; Miss Vietnam 1999; 1st runner-up Miss friendship Southeast Asia 1999
- Hair color: Black
- Eye color: Black

Nguyễn Thiên Nga (born 1975 in Saigon) was crowned the fifth Miss Vietnam in 1996. At the time of the contest Nga was a second year student at the Foreign Trade University in Ho Chi Minh City. She also won the best answer award in the competition.

Nga is the first contestant in the history of the competition to win two "Miss Vietnam" titles, the first in 1996 as the official contestant and the second title in 1999. In that year Nga was the special contestant for choosing a delegate representative for Vietnam in the "Miss Friendship of the World 1999" competition. After graduating from the Foreign Trade University in 2000, Nga decided to study economics in the United States.

== Miss Viet Nam 1996 ==
- Winner: Nguyễn Thiên Nga (Saigon)
- First runner-up: Vũ Minh Thuý (Hải Phòng)
- Second runner-up: Đỗ Vân Anh (Hà Nội)

Awards and achievements
Preceded by Nguyễn Thu Thủy	Miss Vietnam; 1996	Succeeded by Nguyễn Thị Ngọc Khánh
