= Nguyễn Thu Thủy (Miss Vietnam) =

Vietnamese beauty pageant contestant (1976–2021)

- Born: Nguyễn Thu Thủy; June 20, 1976; Hanoi, Vietnam
- Died: June 5, 2021 (aged 44); Hanoi, Vietnam
- Education: Diplomatic Academy of Vietnam
- Occupation: beauty pageant contestant
- Height: 1.72 m (5 ft 8 in)
- Spouse: Peter (m. 2002–2005)
- Children: 2
- Beauty pageant titleholder
- Title: Miss Vietnam 1994
- Years active: 1994–2021
- Hair color: Black
- Eye color: Black

Nguyễn Thu Thuỷ (June 20, 1976 – June 5, 2021) was a Vietnamese beauty pageant winner, who was crowned as the 4th Miss Vietnam in 1994 when she was a first year student at the Institute for International Relations (Cung Văn hóa Hữu nghị Việt - Xô) in Hanoi.

== Biography ==
Thuỷ was born into an intelligentsia family. Her father, Nguyễn Văn Lợi, and mother were civil servants in the Linguistics Institute of Vietnam (Viện Ngôn ngữ học).

Thuỷ was 1.72 m (5 ft 8 in) tall and was one of the favorites during that edition, where she also attained the best award in the competition. Nguyễn studied business administration in the United States for 2 years and owned a beauty salon chain in Hanoi.

She was married and had two children. On 5 June 2021, Thuỷ died from a sudden cardiac arrest after feeling unwell for a few days.

== Death ==
In the early morning of June 5, 2021, Nguyễn Thu Thủy died at the age of 44 after a stroke. She was taken to the 108 Military Central Hospital in Hanoi for emergency treatment on the night of June 4 in a state of cardiac arrest. The cause of death was not clearly determined; her family stated that she had been ill before she died.

== Miss Viet Nam 1994 ==
The winner: Nguyễn Thu Thuỷ (Hà Nội)

- 1st runner-up: Tô Hương Lan (Tuyên Quang)
- 2nd runner-up: Trịnh Kim Chi (Ho Chi Minh City)

== Television shows ==
- 21st Century Man (on 5 June 2007, as jury woman)
- An Ninh Toàn Cảnh (ANTV) (on January 2017, she was the host)

Awards and achievements
Preceded by Hà Kiều Anh	Miss Vietnam; 1994	Succeeded by Nguyễn Thiên Nga
