= Mai Phương Thúy =

Vietnamese beauty pageant and model

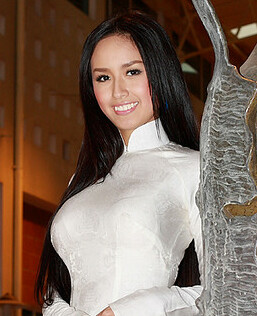
- Born: August 6, 1988 (age 38); Hanoi, Vietnam
- Beauty pageant titleholder
- Title: Miss Vietnam 2006; Miss World Vietnam 2006
- Hair color: black
- Eye color: brown
- Major competitions: Miss Vietnam 2006 (Winner); Miss World 2006 (Top 17)

Mai Phương Thúy (August 6, 1988) is a Vietnamese actress, model and beauty pageant titleholder who was crowned the 10th Miss Vietnam at the Vinpearl Resort in Nha Trang, Vietnam on August 26, 2006. She represented Vietnam at the Miss World 2006 pageant in Warsaw, Poland on September 30, in the Asia-Pacific group. She made the first cut In Miss World 2006 by winning the viewers' votes around the world.

She had posed for photographs in 2007 for photographer Tran Huy Hoan; the set is described as "nude photos". Tran Huy Hoan has sold oil paintings of a nude lady that bears a likeness to Mai Phương Thúy. She is the goodwill ambassador for the Asia Injury Prevention Foundation. She studied at Phan Dinh Phung high school and was accepted into the Foreign Trade University and RMIT University Vietnam. Besides being a beauty queen, with a background in her major in the economy, she is also a stock investor in Vietnam.

== Personal life ==
Mai Phương Thúy had a romantic relationship with singer Noo Phước Thịnh in 2008. The two publicly revealed this relationship in 2018. After some time, they confirmed their breakup and maintain a friendship.

On July 30, 2024, it was reported that Mai Phương Thúy was said to be in a stable relationship with her boyfriend, a businessman, and there were also rumors of an impending wedding at that time.

== Criticism ==
Around mid-2009, Mai Phương Thúy caused a public stir with provocative photoshoots in revealing bikinis that she continuously released, along with her intention to do a nude photoshoot, which the beauty queen explained was for charitable purposes. This incident sparked significant controversy and debate in the mass media and online forums, causing her to face considerable criticism and reproach. On the other hand, there were also widespread rumors among the public suggesting the beauty queen had undergone excessive cosmetic surgery on her bust, but she denied this. Netizens also once caused an uproar when a video clip circulated on the internet showing a girl, alleged to strongly resemble Miss Mai Phương Thúy, arguing loudly with people on the street. The press asked confrontational questions, but Mai Phương Thúy declined to comment on this event.

In 2012, the photoshoot "Xuân thì" (roughly translating to "Youthful Spring" or "Adolescence") featuring Mai Phương Thúy wearing an ao dai made of thin material and in poses considered overly provocative was released online. Some newspapers heavily criticized it, claiming the photoshoot tarnished the image of the ao dai and demanded that Mai Phương Thúy be stripped of her beauty queen crown. Other newspapers, however, assessed it as a beautiful photoshoot that honored the beauty of the traditional Vietnamese ao dai.

Mai Phương Thúy also faced other issues concerning her attitude, such as alleged impoliteness in an advertisement and during an interaction with a security guard at the Ho Chi Minh City Post Office in September 2011.

Awards and achievements
Preceded by Nguyễn Thị Huyền	Miss Vietnam; 2006	Succeeded by Trần Thị Thùy Dung
Preceded by Vũ Hương Giang	Miss World Vietnam; 2006	Succeeded by Đặng Thị Minh Thu
