= Trần Thị Thùy Dung =

Vietnamese model

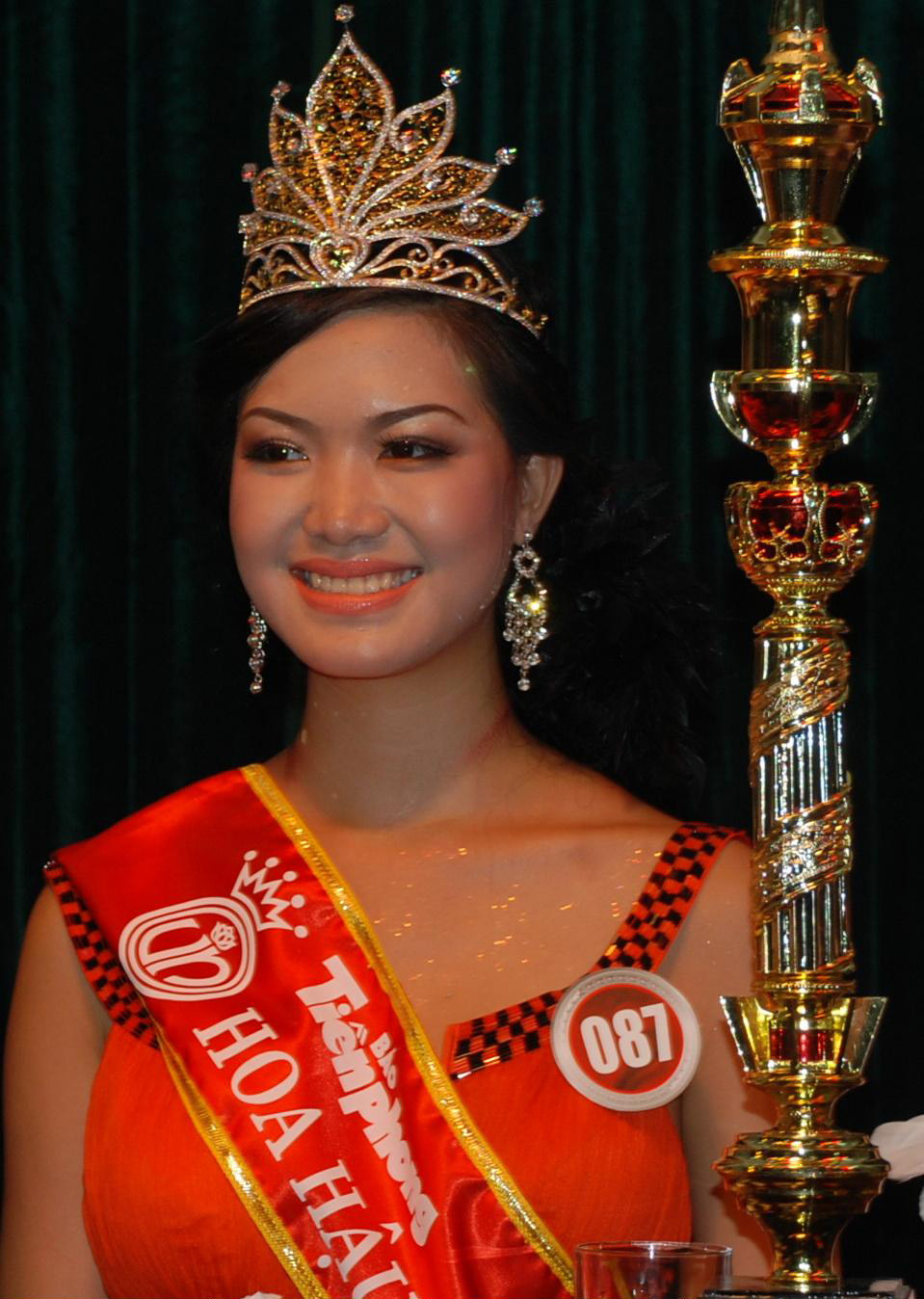
- Born: July 8, 1990 (age 36); Đà Nẵng, Vietnam
- Beauty pageant titleholder
- Title: Miss Vietnam 2008
- Major competitions: Miss Vietnam 2008 (Winner)

Trần Thị Thùy Dung (born February 18, 1990, in Đà Nẵng, Việt Nam) was crowned as Miss Vietnam 2008 on August 31 in Hội An.

On December 13, Dung was not allowed to represent her country in Miss World 2008 in Johannesburg, South Africa, due to her unlegalized high school graduation certificate.

== Biography ==
Dung is originally from Quảng Nam, grew up in Da Nang, and is a former student of Quang Trung High School.

Before participating in Miss Vietnam 2008, Dung had received an admission notice from Newton International College and had taken a break from 12th grade to prepare for studying abroad.

Awards and achievements
Preceded by Mai Phương Thúy	Miss Vietnam; 2008	Succeeded by Đặng Thị Ngọc Hân
