= Tuần Châu Aquarium =

Tuan Chau Aquarium
- Interactive map of Tuan Chau Aquarium
- 20.9277209°N 106.990659°E
- Location: Tuan Chau Island, Ha Long Bay, Vietnam

Tuan Chau Aquarium is an aquarium located on Tuan Chau Island in Ha Long Bay, Vietnam. The structure itself reflects a very modern style of architecture.
