= Trịnh Thùy Linh =

Vietnamese beauty pageant runner-up

- Born: Thanh Hóa, Vietnam
- Education: National Economics University
- Beauty pageant titleholder
- Major competition: Miss Vietnam 2022 (1st Runner-Up)

Trịnh Thùy Linh is a Vietnamese beauty pageant runner-up. She was born in 2002 in Thanh Hóa, and graduated with a major in Business and Marketing at National Economics University. Linh was first runner-up at Miss Vietnam 2022.

Awards and achievements
Preceded by Phạm Ngọc Phương Anh	1st Runner-up Miss Vietnam; 2022	Succeeded by Trần Ngọc Châu Anh
