= Phan Thu Ngân =

Vietnamese beauty pageant contestant (born 1980)

- Born: Phan Thu Ngân; 1980 (age 45–46); Đồng Nai, Vietnam
- Height: 1.69 m (5 ft 6 1/2 in)
- Beauty pageant titleholder
- Title: Miss Vietnam 2000
- Hair color: Black
- Eye color: Black
- Major competitions: Miss Vietnam 2000 (Winner)

Phan Thu Ngân (born 1980 in Đồng Nai) was crowned the seventh Miss Vietnam in 2000 when she was a second year student at Văn Lang University, Ho Chi Minh City. She also received the best answer award in the competition. After the Miss Viet Nam 2000 beauty pageant, she got married and refused to compete in Miss Universe 2001.

Awards and achievements
Preceded by Nguyễn Thị Ngọc Khánh	Miss Vietnam; 2000	Succeeded by Phạm Thị Mai Phương
