= Nguyễn Diệu Hoa =

Miss Vietnam 1990 (born 1969)

- Born: Nguyễn Diệu Hoa; 1969 (age 56–57); Hanoi, Vietnam
- Height: 1.62 m (5 ft 4 in)
- Beauty pageant titleholder
- Title: Miss Vietnam 1990, Top 5 Mrs World 2008
- Hair color: Black
- Eye color: Black

Nguyễn Diệu Hoa (born 1969 in Hanoi) was crowned the second Miss Vietnam in 1990 when she was at Level 5 in Russian language at Hanoi University of Foreign Studies. She holds an MBA degree from the Asian Institute of Technology (AIT), Thailand. She can speak six languages: Vietnamese, English, Thai, Hindi, Russian, and French. She works at Ceres Commodities Pvt Ltd Company in Thailand.

Awards and achievements
Preceded by Bùi Bích Phương	Miss Vietnam; 1990	Succeeded by Hà Kiều Anh
