= Miss Vietnam 2024 =

- Date: June 27, 2025
- Presenters: Danh Tùng; Lê Nguyễn Ngọc Hằng (Preliminary); Đức Bảo; Phí Linh (Final)
- Entertainment: Lưu Hiền Trinh; Satila Hồng Vịnh; Bùi Lan Hương (Preliminary); Hồ Ngọc Hà; Nguyễn Trần Trung Quân; Giang Hồng Ngọc; Satila Hồng Vịnh; Trọng Phúc; Xuân Định K.Y; Hoàng Rob (Final)
- Venue: Water Stage, Hương River, Huế Ancient Capital, Huế City
- Broadcaster: VTV8
- Entrants: 25
- Placements: 15
- Winner: Hà Trúc Linh; Phú Yên

Miss Vietnam 2024 (Vietnamese: Hoa hậu Việt Nam 2024) was the 19th edition of the Miss Vietnam pageant. It was held on June 27, 2025 at the Water Stage, Hương River, Huế Ancient Capital in Huế City, Vietnam. Miss Vietnam 2022 Huỳnh Thị Thanh Thủy crowned her successor Hà Trúc Linh at the end of the event.

The contest was supposed to take place in 2024, but due to many reasons, the contest was postponed to 2025, even though it was called Miss Vietnam 2024.

== Results ==
=== Placements ===
Final result	Contestant
Miss Vietnam 2024	687 – Hà Trúc Linh
1st Runner-Up	220 – Trần Ngọc Châu Anh
2nd Runner-Up	136 – Nguyễn Thị Vân Nhi (§)
Top 5	870 – Hồ Ngọc Phương Linh; 983 – Phạm Thùy Dương
Top 10	146 – Bùi Thùy Nhiên; 238 – Nguyễn Phương Nhi; 625 – Nguyễn Hoàng Mỹ Vân; 856 – Đinh Hoàng Linh Đan; 926 – Nguyễn Thị Thu Hằng
Top 15	531 – Đoàn Thị Diệu Huyền; 547 – Hoàng Thị Hiền Nhi; 588 – Trần Minh Thu; 658 – Trần Thị Huyền Cơ; 882 – Phạm Thị Thanh Xuân

§ – Miss Popular Vote winner

=== Special awards ===
Special Award	Contestant
Miss Popular Vote	136 – Nguyễn Thị Vân Nhi
Miss Humanity	238 – Nguyễn Phương Nhi
Miss Tourism and Environment	983 – Phạm Thùy Dương
Miss Media and Arts	625 – Nguyễn Hoàng Mỹ Vân
Miss Sports and Fashion	856 – Đinh Hoàng Linh Đan

== Contestants ==
25 contestants in the final.

Contestants
Võ Thị Thanh Bình
Nguyễn Mai Phương
Hoàng Thị Tú Anh
Nguyễn Thị Vân Nhi
Bùi Thùy Nhiên
Trần Ngọc Châu Anh
Nguyễn Phương Nhi
Nguyễn Phương Chi
Đoàn Thị Diệu Huyền
Hoàng Thị Hiền Nhi
Võ Đoàn Bảo Hà
Trần Minh Thu
Lê Hoàng Khánh Linh
Hà Thị Giang Thanh
Nguyễn Hoàng Mỹ Vân
Nguyễn Thanh Thảo
Trần Thị Huyền Cơ
Hà Trúc Linh
Đinh Hoàng Linh Đan
Hồ Ngọc Phương Linh
Phạm Thị Thanh Xuân
Nguyễn Thị Thu Hằng
Lê Thị Mỹ Dung
Phùng Thị Hương Giang
Phạm Thuỳ Dương
