= Bùi Bích Phương =

Miss Vietnam pageant winner (born 1971)

- Born: Bùi Bích Phương; 1971 (age 54–55); Hanoi, North Vietnam
- Height: 1.58 m (5 ft 2 in)
- Beauty pageant titleholder
- Title: Miss Vietnam 1988
- Hair color: Black
- Eye color: Black

Bùi Bích Phương (born 1971) was crowned Miss Vietnam in 1988. During this period she was a first year English student at the University of Hanoi.

Awards and achievements
| Preceded by First Edition | Miss Vietnam; 1988 | Succeeded by Nguyễn Diệu Hoa |
