= Trần Quốc Ẩn =

Vietnamese artist and calligrapher

Trần Quốc Ẩn (Nha Trang, 1961 - ) is a Vietnamese artist and calligrapher. He is notable for projects of large books, such as a 54 kg brush written and illustrated edition of 143 poems of Hoàng Quang Thuận.
