= Nguyễn Thị Huyền (Miss Vietnam) =

- Born: Nguyễn Thị Huyền; 4 July 1985 (age 41); Hai Phong, Vietnam
- Height: 1.72 m (5 ft 7 1/2 in)
- Spouse: Tống Ngọc Trung (m. 2007; div. 2009)
- Children: 1
- Beauty pageant titleholder
- Title: Miss Vietnam 2004
- Hair color: Black
- Eye color: Black
- Major competitions: Miss Sport Vietnam 2001 (1st Runner-Up); Miss Vietnam 2004 (Winner); Miss World 2004 (Top 15)

Nguyễn Thị Huyền (born 1985 in Hải Phòng) was crowned the 9th Miss Vietnam in 2004. At the time she was a student at the Hanoi Press College. She was the second Miss Vietnam to enter the Miss World competition in 2004. She was one of the 15 semi-finalists in the competition.

Awards and achievements
Preceded by Phạm Thị Mai Phương	Miss Vietnam; 2004	Succeeded by Mai Phương Thúy
Preceded by Nguyễn Đình Thụy Quân	Miss World Vietnam; 2004	Succeeded by Vũ Hương Giang
