= Huỳnh Thị Thanh Thủy =

Vietnamese beauty pageant titleholder

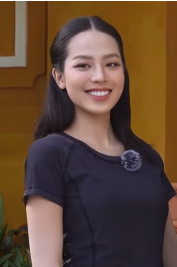
- Thủy in 2022
- Born: 2002 (age 23–24); Danang, Vietnam
- Education: University of Foreign Language Studies; University of Greenwich
- Beauty pageant titleholder
- Title: Miss Vietnam 2022; Miss International 2024
- Major competitions: Miss Vietnam 2022 (Winner); Miss International 2024 (Winner)

Huỳnh Thị Thanh Thủy (born 2002) is a Vietnamese beauty pageant titleholder, who won Miss Vietnam 2022 and Miss International 2024. She was the first Vietnamese woman to win Miss International.

== Early life ==
Thủy was born in 2002, in Danang, her mother is a housewife, and her father is a civil servant.

In 2016, she won second prize in the Vietnamese literature contest, Danang Excellent Student Selection Examination. In 2019, she won a silver medal in the youth fashion competition at the Danang City Spring Flower Festival.

She is studying English language at the University of Foreign Language Studies. She is also studying at University of Greenwich.

== Pageantry ==
=== Miss Vietnam 2022 ===
Thủy won Miss University of Foreign Languages 2021, and then represented her university at the Miss Elegant Student Danang City 2021, and was first runner-up. She then represented the city and won Miss Vietnam 2022 on December 23, 2022, at the Phu Tho Indoor Stadium in Ho Chi Minh City. During the contest, she won the sport award, was in the top five of Beauty with a Purpose, top five of the Multimedia challenge.

As Miss Vietnam 2022, she participated in charity work, notably: a project called "Spring of love – Warm Tet" in Khánh Hòa province, Bạc Liêu province, Bến Tre province.

=== Miss International 2024 ===
Thủy won Miss International 2024 on November 12, 2024 in Tokyo, Japan.

== Fake photos ==
Two months after winning Miss International, on Vietnamese Facebook and TikTok, fake images were posted of Thủy and Soobin Hoàng Sơn getting married and having a baby. On January 17, SpaceSpeakers Label – Soobin's management company, spoke out against these images. On January 18, her management company also issued a statement clarifying that they were created by artificial intelligence.

Awards and achievements
Preceded by Andrea Rubio	Miss International; 2024	Succeeded by Catalina Duque
Preceded by Nguyễn Phương Nhi	Miss International Vietnam; 2024	Succeeded by Nguyễn Ngọc Kiều Duy
Preceded by Đỗ Thị Hà	Miss Vietnam; 2022	Succeeded by Hà Trúc Linh
Preceded by Đỗ Huỳnh Nhã Uyên	Miss University of Foreign Languages; 2021	Succeeded by Trần Nguyễn Phương Thy
