= Phạm Thị Mai Phương =

Vietnamese beauty pageant contestant (born 1985)

- Born: Phạm Thị Mai Phương; 1985 (age 40–41); Hải Phòng, Vietnam
- Height: 1.69 m (5 ft 7 in)
- Beauty pageant titleholder
- Title: Miss Vietnam 2002
- Hair color: Black
- Eye color: Black
- Major competitions: Miss Vietnam 2002 (Winner); Miss World 2002 (Top 20)

Phạm Thị Mai Phương (born 1985) is a Vietnamese beauty pageant titleholder who was crowned Miss World Vietnam 2002. She was the first Miss Vietnam to enter the Miss World competition in 2002, where she placed in the top 20. In 2003, she was accepted into the University of Luton where she studied business.

Awards and achievements
Preceded by Phan Thu Ngân	Miss Vietnam; 2002	Succeeded by Nguyễn Thị Huyền
Preceded by 'First'	Miss World Vietnam; 2002	Succeeded by Nguyễn Đình Thụy Quân
