= Hà Trúc Linh =

Vietnamese model and beauty pageant titleholder

- Born: Hà Trúc Linh; November 2, 2004 (age 22); Phú Yên, Vietnam
- Education: University of Finance - Marketing
- Beauty pageant titleholder
- Title: Miss Vietnam 2024
- Hair color: Black
- Eye color: Black
- Major competitions: Miss Vietnam 2024 (Winner)

Hà Trúc Linh (born 2 November 2004) is a Vietnamese model and beauty pageant titleholder, She was crowned Miss Vietnam 2024.

== Career ==
Linh was born in 2004 in Phú Yên. She studied Marketing at the University of Finance - Marketing. Previously, Linh was crowned Miss University of Finance - Marketing 2023.

On June 27, 2025, Linh was officially crowned Miss Vietnam 2024 at the Water Stage, Hương River, Huế. She is the 19th Miss Vietnam.

Awards and achievements
Preceded by Huỳnh Thị Thanh Thủy	Miss Vietnam; 2024	Succeeded by Nguyễn Yến Trang
