= Nguyễn Địch Dũng =

Vietnamese journalist and writer

Nguyễn Địch Dũng (15 July 1925 in Từ Sơn – 26 October 1993) was a Vietnamese journalist and writer. He is noted in the West for his short story collections.
