= Tuần Châu =

Island in Vietnam

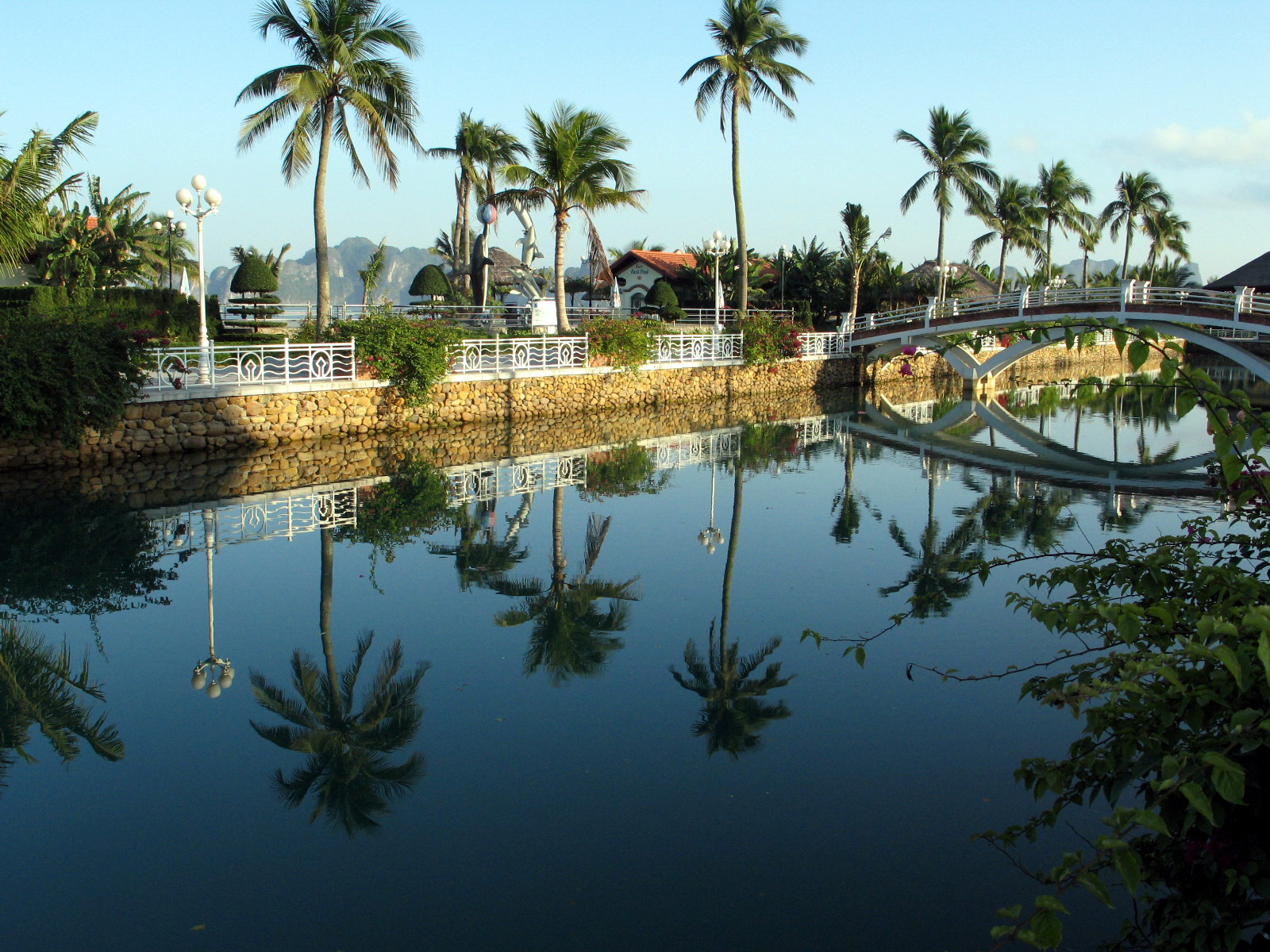
- Scenery on Tuần Châu island

- Location within Vietnam

Geography
- Location: Hạ Long Bay
- Coordinates: 20.931076°N 106.986580°E
- Area: 2.3 km^{2} (0.89 sq mi)

Administration
- Vietnam
- City: Quảng Ninh

Demographics
- Population: 1500
- Pop. density: 681.82/km^{2} (1765.91/sq mi)
- Ethnic groups: Vietnamese people

Tuần Châu is a ward and schist island on the southwest side of Quảng Ninh in Vietnam.

== Overview ==
Covered by palm forests, Tuần Châu island has an area of 2.2 km^{2}. To the east and south are two man-made beaches with white sand. Tuần Châu Island is among the most touristic destinations in Hạ Long.

== Etymology ==
In the feudal time, the royal army set up a guard station here to patrol and defend the borderland. The name of Tuần Châu is the combination of ‘linh tuan’ (the patrolman) and ‘tri chau’ (district chief).

== Location ==
Tuần Châu is located in an important position at the entrance of the waterway system of Thăng Long, Bặch Đằng and Vân Ðồn.

== History ==
The island has many archaeological sites pertaining to the ancient Hạ Long culture from 3,000 to 5,000 years ago. Because of its location, the royal army set up a guard station here to patrol and defend the borderland. The Office of Feudal Customs was also installed there. President Hồ Chí Minh used to spend holidays there, in an octagonal house that has now become a memorial site.

== Tourism ==
Tuần Châu Island can be reached via the 2-km cement road from the mainland. The construction of this road was undertaken by Tuan Chau 5-star yacht company and officially started on February 28, 1998. Investments have been poured into the island to create a modern tourist resort. It includes attractions such as the dolphin, sea lion, and performing-seal club, animal circus club, golf course, cultural-sports center, beach, rural market, ornamental fish lake, villas in Hill 1 and Hill 2, guesthouses, five 80-room villas by the beach. The ensemble of five restaurants and one round house built in the pagoda motif can serve up to 500 guests at a time.

From 2014, there is another way to reach Tuan Chau Island from Hanoi that is a direct flight from Hanoi to Tuan Chau Island, Halong Bay by seaplane of Hai Au Aviation. The flight allows you to enjoy a bird's eye view of the thousands of limestone karsts jutting up from the jade green waters and see remote fishing villages before landing at Tuan Chau Island Marina.

=== The Marina ===
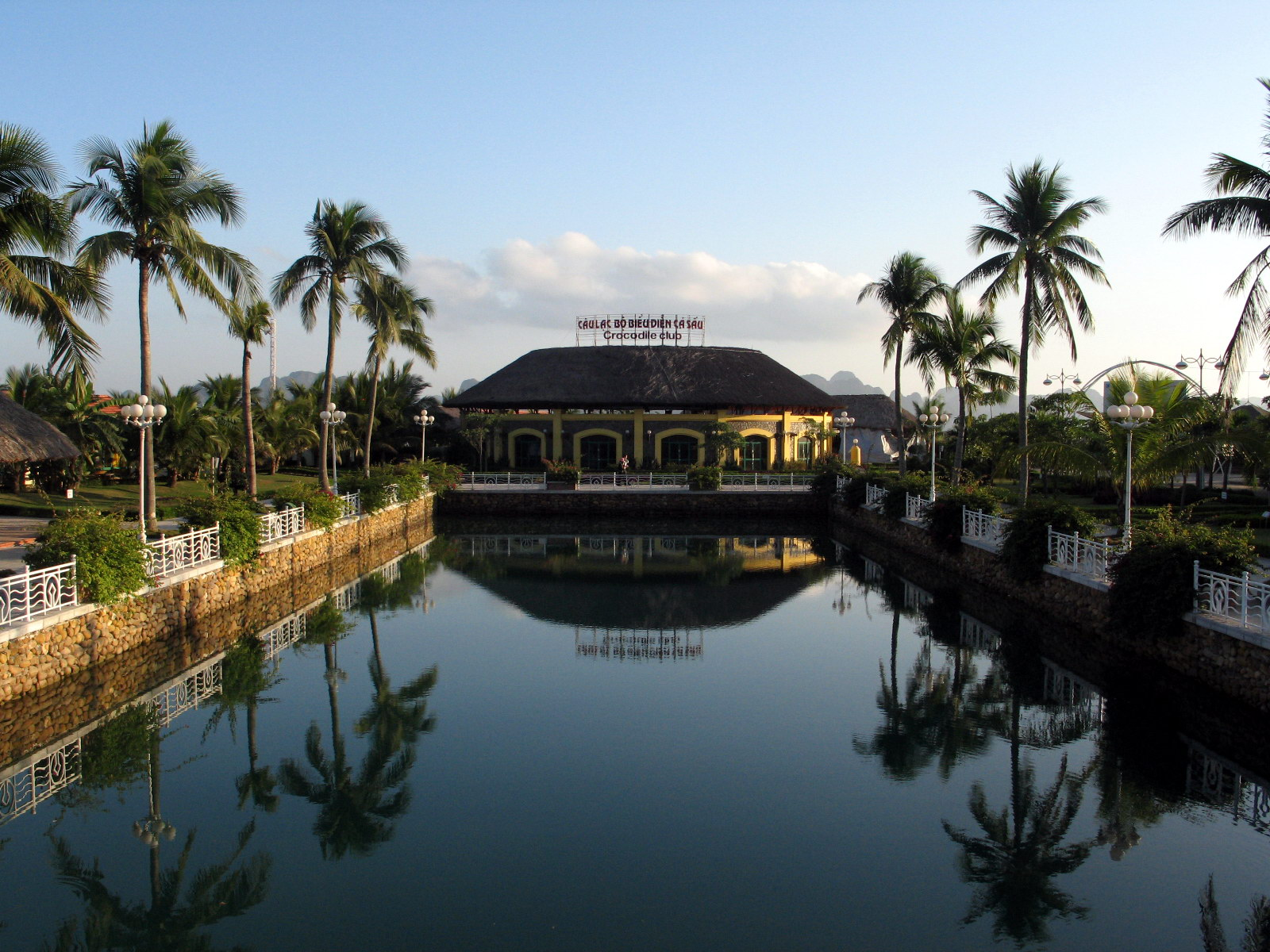

The pier of Tuần Châu island hosts only 10% of all boat companies cruising on Halong bay and provides cruisers with cafés, souvenir shops, and daily entertainment shows with young local dancers performing modern dances. Some boat companies also offer private lounges for their passengers awaiting boarding time. Tuần Châu island is at present constructing a much larger marina integrated in a touristic resort that should be completed in years to come.

List of cruise companies sailing from Tuần Châu pier
Bhaya Cruises
The Au Co Cruise
Bhaya Legend Private Cruise
Paradise Cruises
V'Spirit Cruise
Pelican
Aphrodite Cruises
Golden Cruise
Aclass
Grayline
Halong Phoenix Cruiser
Image Halong

In 2004, Miss Vietnam was held there. In 2005, Tuần Châu was where the "Vietnam: The Island of Mr. Sang" episode of Anthony Bourdain: No Reservations was filmed. This is also the place where Carnaval Ha Long 2022: Color of Wonder took place with many interesting activities.

== See also ==
- Tuần Châu Aquarium
