= Đồ Sơn district =

Đồ Sơn district Quận Đồ Sơn
- Urban district
- Location of Đồ Sơn in Vietnam
- Coordinates: 20°42′49″N 106°47′22″E
- Country: Vietnam
- City: Haiphong

Area
  - Total: 42.37 km^{2} (16.36 sq mi)

Population (2007)
  - Total: 51,417
  - Density: 1,213/km^{2} (3,140/sq mi)

Đồ Sơn is a former urban district (quận) of Haiphong, the third largest city of Vietnam.

== Geography ==
Đồ Sơn district is located on the bank of the Gulf of Tonkin, 22 km away from Haiphong.

As of 2007, the district had a population of 51,417. It covers an area of 42.37 km^{2} (16.36 sq mi).

The district is subdivided into 7 wards: Bàng La, Hợp Đức, Minh Đức, Ngọc Hải, Ngọc Xuyên, Vạn Hương and Vạn Sơn.

Đồ Sơn was formerly a resort town of Haiphong. It was built as a summer resort by the French in the 19th century, after they established themselves in the city.

The district is known for its many historical and cultural attractions, and several beaches beside picturesque hills.

According to official information, it has 52 hotels and 230 restaurants totaling 3,000 rooms. The Franco-Vietnamese school was opened here in 1999 with the aim to hold events such as training programs, lectures (in French, with simultaneous translation in Vietnamese), workshops, round tables and small group study-sessions. The institution also initiates research projects between the two countries.

The resort received 850,000 tourists in 2002.

Đồ Sơn became a primary venue for the 2007 Haiphong Tourist Festival with the slogan "Đồ Sơn – call of the sea", attracting both local and foreign artistic delegations and visitors. The festivities included an International Sculpture Camp, the Đồ Sơn Buffalo Competition, a Fishing Village Open Festival, a youth camp, a beach volleyball competition, a boat race, a waterskiing performance, and an artistic program.

== Climate ==
Climate data for Hon Dau, Đồ Sơn District
Month	Jan	Feb	Mar	Apr	May	Jun	Jul	Aug	Sep	Oct	Nov	Dec	Year
Record high °C (°F)	28.0 (82.4)	28.3 (82.9)	30.0 (86.0)	32.6 (90.7)	37.3 (99.1)	36.8 (98.2)	38.0 (100.4)	38.6 (101.5)	35.7 (96.3)	37.2 (99.0)	32.5 (90.5)	31.5 (88.7)	38.6 (101.5)
Mean daily maximum °C (°F)	20.0 (68.0)	19.8 (67.6)	21.8 (71.2)	25.9 (78.6)	30.3 (86.5)	31.7 (89.1)	31.9 (89.4)	31.5 (88.7)	30.8 (87.4)	29.0 (84.2)	26.0 (78.8)	22.4 (72.3)	26.7 (80.1)
Daily mean °C (°F)	17.1 (62.8)	17.3 (63.1)	19.5 (67.1)	23.2 (73.8)	27.1 (80.8)	28.8 (83.8)	29.2 (84.6)	28.6 (83.5)	27.8 (82.0)	25.8 (78.4)	22.6 (72.7)	19.1 (66.4)	23.8 (74.8)
Mean daily minimum °C (°F)	15.5 (59.9)	15.8 (60.4)	17.9 (64.2)	21.4 (70.5)	25.2 (77.4)	26.7 (80.1)	27.1 (80.8)	26.4 (79.5)	25.6 (78.1)	23.7 (74.7)	20.6 (69.1)	17.2 (63.0)	21.9 (71.4)
Record low °C (°F)	6.2 (43.2)	6.6 (43.9)	7.3 (45.1)	13.0 (55.4)	16.5 (61.7)	19.2 (66.6)	19.9 (67.8)	21.5 (70.7)	16.7 (62.1)	14.9 (58.8)	12.6 (54.7)	6.9 (44.4)	6.2 (43.2)
Average precipitation mm (inches)	24.7 (0.97)	21.5 (0.85)	39.7 (1.56)	70.0 (2.76)	151.8 (5.98)	194.3 (7.65)	209.0 (8.23)	337.1 (13.27)	288.2 (11.35)	148.4 (5.84)	42.4 (1.67)	19.4 (0.76)	1,546.6 (60.89)
Average rainy days	6.3	9.7	12.8	9.8	9.7	11.7	11.6	15.7	13.3	8.7	5.2	4.2	118.8
Average relative humidity (%)	82.4	87.2	89.9	90.0	86.9	86.1	85.1	86.3	83.9	79.7	77.8	77.6	84.4
Mean monthly sunshine hours	75.9	58.3	33.9	94.9	189.3	185.4	173.0	176.7	170.6	180.1	125.9	107.9	1,571.7
Source: Vietnam Institute for Building Science and Technology
