= Nguyễn Thị Ngọc Khánh =

Miss Vietnam 1998 (born 1976)

- Born: Nguyễn Thị Ngọc Khánh; July 28, 1976 (age 50); Ho Chi Minh City, Vietnam
- Height: 1.72 m (5 ft 8 in)
- Beauty pageant titleholder
- Title: Miss Vietnam 1998; 1st runner-up Miss International Fashion Egypt 1999
- Hair color: Black
- Eye color: Black

Nguyễn Thị Ngọc Khánh (born July 28, 1976, in Hanoi) was crowned the sixth Miss Vietnam on November 1, 1998, at sporting event hall Phan Đình Phùng, Ho Chi Minh City, when she was a student at Law University, Ho Chi Minh City. Khánh's father was director Nguyễn Đỗ Ngọc, while her mother is Houtbois-player Lê Thị Thắng. Khánh married Lê Công Định, a prominent lawyer, in 2004. She was a flight attendant, a director of Tien Sa Company, an employee of Sacchi Sacchi advertising company and model.

== Miss Viet Nam 1998 ==
- Winner: Nguyễn Thị Ngọc Khánh (Saigon)
- First runner-up: Vũ Thị Thu (Quảng Ninh)
- Second runner-up: Ngô Thuý Hà (Hà Nội)

== Miss International Fashion Egypt 1999 ==
Ngoc Khanh is first runner-up in Miss International Fashion Egypt 1999,

Awards and achievements
Preceded by Nguyễn Thiên Nga	Miss Vietnam; 1998	Succeeded by Phan Thu Ngân
