= Trần Quốc Ân =

Vietnamese painter

Trần Quốc Ân (fl. 1944) was a Vietnamese painter who studied in the 1944–1945 class at EBAI, Hanoi.
