= Đồ Sơn =

- Ward
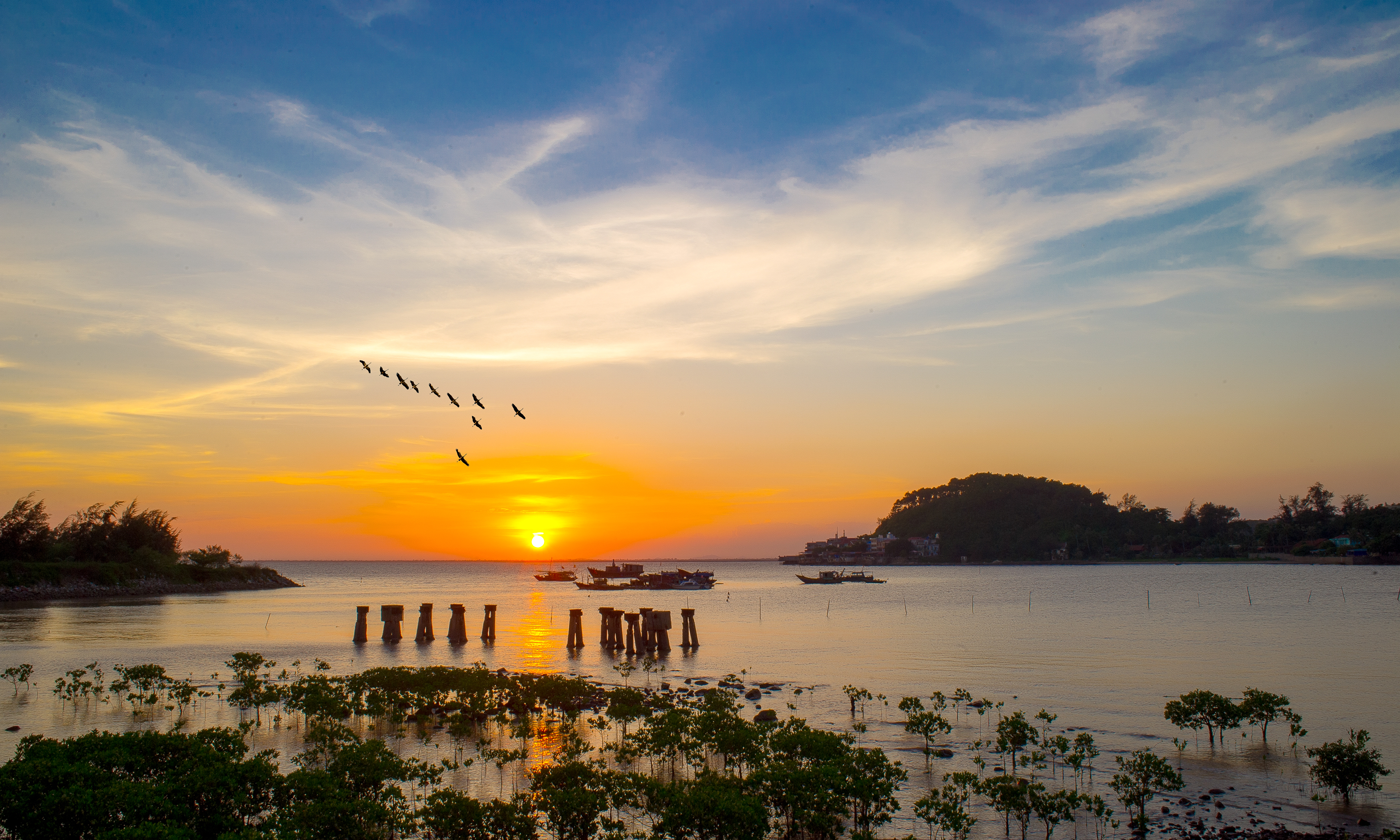
- Đồ Sơn Beach
- Interactive map of Đồ Sơn
- Coordinates: 20.716178343418658°N 106.7827997195913°E
- Country: Vietnam
- Region: Red River Delta
- Municipality: Hai Phong
- Established: 16 June 2025
- Administrative headquarters: 195 Lý Thánh Tông Street (former Ngọc Xuyên Ward)

Area
  - Total: 25.54 km^{2} (9.86 sq mi)

Population (2025)
  - Total: 36,494
  - Density: 1,429/km^{2} (3,700/sq mi)
- Website: doson.haiphong.gov.vn

Đồ Sơn is a ward in the municipality of Hai Phong, Vietnam. The ward was established from the entire area and population of Hải Sơn Ward, parts of Vạn Hương and Ngọc Xuyên wards, formerly part of Đồ Sơn district, and part of Tân Thành Ward, formerly part of Dương Kinh district.

Most of the area of present-day Đồ Sơn Ward was formerly located in Đồ Sơn district, Hai Phong.

On 16 June 2025, the Standing Committee of the National Assembly of Vietnam issued a resolution on the arrangement of commune-level administrative units in Hai Phong in 2025. Under the resolution, the entire area and population of Hải Sơn Ward, together with parts of Tân Thành, Vạn Hương, and Ngọc Xuyên wards, were merged to form a new ward named Đồ Sơn.
