= Tiền Phong (newspaper) =

Vietnamese daily newspaper

- Type: Daily Newspaper
- Format: Print, online
- Owner(s): Central Committee of the Ho Chi Minh Communist Youth Union
- Founded: 1957
- Political alignment: Ho Chi Minh Thought; Socialist-oriented market economy
- Language: Vietnamese
- Website: https://www.tienphong.vn/

Tiền Phong (Vietnamese: Báo Tiền Phong, meaning "Vanguard") is a Vietnamese daily newspaper published by the Central Committee of the Ho Chi Minh Communist Youth Union, the youth wing of the Communist Party of Vietnam. It was established during the First Indochina War as one of the first revolutionary newspapers in Vietnam, at about the same time as the predecessors of Quan Doi Nhan Dan and Nhan Dan.

Tôn Đức Lượng was in charge of illustrations from 1957 to 1982.
