= Miss World Vietnam 2023 =

Beauty pageant edition

- Date: July 22, 2023
- Presenters: Vũ Mạnh Cường; Chế Nguyễn Quỳnh Châu; Nguyễn Danh Tùng; Nguyễn Thụy Vân; Phạm Ngọc Phương Anh
- Entertainment: Lân Nhã; S.T Sơn Thạch; Sofia; Bích Ngọc; Như Quỳnh; Phương Thủy; Quang Dũng; Hiền Thục; Đông Nhi; Võ Hạ Trâm; Lona
- Venue: MerryLand Quy Nhơn, Quy Nhơn, Bình Định
- Broadcaster: VTV
- Entrants: 40
- Placements: 20
- Winner: Huỳnh Trần Ý Nhi; Bình Định

Miss World Vietnam 2023 (Vietnamese: Hoa hậu Thế giới Việt Nam 2023) was the 3rd edition of the Miss World Vietnam pageant. It was held on 22 July 2023 at MerryLand Quy Nhơn, Quy Nhơn, Bình Định, Vietnam. Huỳnh Trần Ý Nhi from Bình Định was crowned Miss World Vietnam.

== Results ==
=== Placements ===
Color keys

- Declared as the winner in an international pageant.
- Ended as runner-up in an international pageant.
- Ended as finalist or semi-finalist in an international pageant.
- Unplaced.

| Final result | Contestant | International pagent | International placement |
|---|---|---|---|
| Miss World Vietnam 2023 | 014 – Huỳnh Trần Ý Nhi | Miss World 2025 | Top 40 |
| 1st Runner-up | 064 – Đào Thị Hiền (§) | | |
| 2nd Runner-up | 512 – Huỳnh Minh Kiên | | |
| Top 5 | 211 – Bùi Khánh Linh; 420 – Trần Thị Thoa Thương | | |
| Top 10 | 039 – Nguyễn Thị Phượng; 051 – Nguyễn Ngân Hà; 102 – Đỗ Thị Phương Thanh; 165 – Hoàng Thị Yến Nhi; 404 – Phạm Hương Anh (¥) | | |
| Top 20 | 015 – Trần Phương Nhi; 068 – Mai Thị Hà Thu; 095 – Võ Tấn Sanh Vy; 113 – Phùng Thị Hương Giang; 123 – Hoàng Thu Huyền; 142 – Trần Thị Hồng Linh; 158 – Nguyễn Thiên Thanh; 188 – Bùi Thị Hồng Trang; 193 – Lê Thị Kim Hậu; 256 – Nguyễn Thị Thúy Ngọc; 303 – Phạm Thị Tú Trinh | | |

- (§) – placed into the top 5 by Beauty with a Purpose.
- (¥) – voted intop top 10 by viewers.

=== Special awards ===
| Special Award | | Contestant |
|---|---|---|
| Beauty with a Purpose | | 064 – Đào Thị Hiền |
| Multimedia challenge | Final | 095 – Võ Tấn Sanh Vy |
| Multimedia challenge | Preliminary | 314 – Đỗ Thanh Hường |
| Miss Aodai Award | | 420 – Trần Thị Thoa Thương |
| People's Choice Award | Final | 404 – Phạm Hương Anh |
| People's Choice Award | Preliminary | 404 – Phạm Hương Anh; 012 – Nguyễn Minh Trang |
| Top Model challenge | | 014 – Huỳnh Trần Ý Nhi |
| Head-to-Head Challenge | | 303 – Phạm Thị Tú Trinh |
| Miss Talent | | 051 – Nguyễn Ngân Hà |
| Mr Sports | | 188 – Bùi Thị Hồng Trang |
| Most Beautiful Skin Award | | 102 – Đỗ Thị Phương Thanh |
| Miss Beach | | 211 – Bùi Khánh Linh |
| Miss Tourism | | 193 – Lê Thị Kim Hậu |

== Contestants ==
40 contestants in the final.

| No. | Contestants | Years old | Height | Hometown |
|---|---|---|---|---|
| 211 | Bùi Khánh Linh | 2002 | 177 cm (5 ft 9 1/2 in) | Bắc Giang |
| 188 | Bùi Thị Hồng Trang | 2002 | 171 cm (5 ft 7 1/2 in) | Quảng Ninh |
| 064 | Đào Thị Hiền | 2001 | 175 cm (5 ft 9 in) | Nghệ An |
| 433 | Đoàn Minh Thảo | 2001 | 170 cm (5 ft 7 in) | Hanoi |
| 314 | Đỗ Thanh Hường | 2002 | 170 cm (5 ft 7 in) | Thanh Hóa |
| 102 | Đỗ Thị Phương Thanh | 2000 | 174 cm (5 ft 8 1/2 in) | Thái Bình |
| 174 | Đỗ Thùy Dung | 2003 | 169 cm (5 ft 6 1/2 in) | Bình Dương |
| 311 | Đỗ Trần Ngọc Thảo | 2001 | 168 cm (5 ft 6 in) | Ho Chi Minh City |
| 165 | Hoàng Thị Yến Nhi | 2000 | 170 cm (5 ft 7 in) | Đồng Nai |
| 123 | Hoàng Thu Huyền | 2002 | 174 cm (5 ft 8 1/2 in) | Thái Nguyên |
| 512 | Huỳnh Minh Kiên | 2004 | 171 cm (5 ft 7 1/2 in) | Ninh Thuận |
| 014 | Huỳnh Trần Ý Nhi | 2002 | 175 cm (5 ft 9 in) | Bình Định |
| 153 | Lê Mỹ Duyên | 2003 | 169 cm (5 ft 6 1/2 in) | Thái Bình |
| 193 | Lê Thị Kim Hậu | 2003 | 168 cm (5 ft 6 in) | Cần Thơ |
| 068 | Mai Thị Hà Thu | 2001 | 172 cm (5 ft 7 1/2 in) | Hải Phòng |
| 119 | Nguyễn Hà My | 2004 | 176 cm (5 ft 9 1/2 in) | Đồng Tháp |
| 203 | Nguyễn Hồng Thanh | 2002 | 168 cm (5 ft 6 in) | Cần Thơ |
| 151 | Nguyễn Lê Hoàng Linh | 2004 | 173 cm (5 ft 8 in) | Ho Chi Minh City |
| 012 | Nguyễn Minh Trang | 2004 | 170 cm (5 ft 7 in) | Hà Nội |
| 051 | Nguyễn Ngân Hà | 2003 | 170 cm (5 ft 7 in) | Nghệ An |
| 117 | Nguyễn Ngô Nhật Hạ | 2000 | 169 cm (5 ft 6 1/2 in) | Đà Nẵng |
| 010 | Nguyễn Phương Linh | 2002 | 170 cm (5 ft 7 in) | Hanoi |
| 158 | Nguyễn Thiên Thanh | 2002 | 175 cm (5 ft 9 in) | Đồng Tháp |
| 332 | Nguyễn Thị Lan Anh | 2003 | 170 cm (5 ft 7 in) | Hanoi |
| 027 | Nguyễn Thị Liên | 2000 | 170 cm (5 ft 7 in) | Đắk Lắk |
| 039 | Nguyễn Thị Phượng | 2001 | 174 cm (5 ft 8 1/2 in) | Thanh Hóa |
| 256 | Nguyễn Thị Thúy Ngọc | 1999 | 178 cm (5 ft 10 in) | Long An |
| 404 | Phạm Hương Anh | 2005 | 165 cm (5 ft 5 in) | Hanoi |
| 066 | Phạm Phi Phụng | 2002 | 171 cm (5 ft 7 1/2 in) | An Giang |
| 303 | Phạm Thị Tú Trinh | 1999 | 166 cm (5 ft 5 1/2 in) | Bình Phước |
| 113 | Phùng Thị Hương Giang | 2004 | 173 cm (5 ft 8 in) | Thanh Hóa |
| 351 | Trần Hải Vy | 1998 | 170 cm (5 ft 7 in) | Hải Phòng |
| 015 | Trần Phương Nhi | 2003 | 169 cm (5 ft 6 1/2 in) | Hải Dương |
| 142 | Trần Thị Hồng Linh | 2002 | 172 cm (5 ft 7 1/2 in) | Đà Nẵng |
| 079 | Trần Thị Khánh Ly | 2002 | 169 cm (5 ft 6 1/2 in) | Nam Định |
| 055 | Trần Thị Phương Nhung | 2001 | 171 cm (5 ft 7 1/2 in) | Quảng Bình |
| 420 | Trần Thị Thoa Thương | 2002 | 173 cm (5 ft 8 in) | Quảng Nam |
| 273 | Trần Thị Tú Hảo | 2002 | 170 cm (5 ft 7 in) | Tiền Giang |
| 164 | Võ Quỳnh Thư | 1999 | 171 cm (5 ft 7 1/2 in) | Đắk Lắk |
| 095 | Võ Tấn Sanh Vy | 2003 | 176 cm (5 ft 9 1/2 in) | Thừa Thiên Huế |

== Judges ==
The Miss World Vietnam 2023 final judges were:

- Phạm Thị Kim Dung: CEO of Sen Vàng Entertainment
- Lương Thùy Linh: Miss World Vietnam 2019
- Karolina Bielawska: Miss World 2021
- Nguyễn Thúc Thùy Tiên: Miss Grand International 2021
- Trần Tiểu Vy: Miss Vietnam 2018
- Đỗ Thị Hà: Miss Vietnam 2020
- Lê Thanh Hòa: Fashion designer
- Vân Trang: actor
