= Miss World Vietnam 2025 =

- Date: March 29, 2026
- Venue: Military Zone 7 Stadium, Ho Chi Minh City, Vietnam
- Broadcaster: SKTV Life
- Winner: Phan Phương Oanh; Hà Nội

Miss World Vietnam 2025 (Vietnamese: Hoa hậu Thế giới Việt Nam 2025) was the 4th edition of the Miss World Vietnam pageant. It was held at Military Zone 7 Stadium, Ho Chi Minh City, Vietnam, on March 29, 2026.

Huỳnh Trần Ý Nhi crowned her successor Phan Phương Oanh at the end of the event. The winner will represent her country at Miss World 2027 next year.

== History ==
In August 2025, the pageant organizers decided to send Lê Nguyễn Bảo Ngọc to participate in the 73rd Miss World. Meanwhile, the Miss World Vietnam 2026 pageant will still be held and the winner will participate in the 74th Miss World.

On October 20, 2025, on the occasion of Vietnamese Women's Day, the contest announced the official schedule.

== Results ==
=== Placements ===
Color keys

- Declared as the winner in an international pageant.
- Ended as runner-up in an international pageant.
- Ended as finalist or semi-finalist in an international pageant.
- Unplaced.

Final result	Contestant	International pagent	International placement
Miss World Vietnam 2025	211 – Phan Phương Oanh	Miss World 2027	TBD
1st Runner-up	168 – Lê Phương Khánh Như	Miss International 2026	TBD
2nd Runner-up	014 – Trương Tâm Như		
Top 6	079 – Lê Ngọc Như Quỳnh §; 268 – Đỗ Thùy Linh ¥; 284 – Trần Thị Phương Linh		
Top 10	015 – Võ Đoàn Bảo Hà; 193 – Ngô Thị Kiều Anh; 255 – Lê Phương Quyên; 367 – Nguyễn Lan Nhi; 404 – Phùng Thị Diệu Linh		
Top 20	024 – Lê Thảo Linh; 051 – Trịnh Yến Nhi; 055 – Trần Thị Kiều Anh; 063 – Phạm Thùy Dung; 102 – Bùi Thu Thủy; 114 – Trịnh Vũ Hồng Duyên; 151 – Phan Hải Như; 164 – Nguyễn Thị Thu Hằng; 165 – Nguyễn Đào Tuyên Dương; 273 – Lê Thị Trang		

- (§) – placed into the top 6 by Beauty with a Purpose.
- (¥) – voted intop top 6 by viewers.

== Contestants ==
50 contestants in the final.

No.	Contestants	Height	Hometown	Note
001	Nguyễn Hà Ngọc Minh			
002	Trương Tâm Như			
003	Phùng Thị Diệu Linh			
008	Lê Ngọc Như Quỳnh			
011	Lê Thị Trang			
012	Nguyễn Đình Minh Thi			
013	Vũ Thị Kiều Trinh			
015	Nguyễn Phương Hồng Thắm			
016	Nguyễn Thị Sinh			
018	Lê Phương Quyên			
022	Trịnh Vũ Hồng Duyên			
023	Huỳnh Ngọc Minh Phúc			
025	Võ Ngọc Yến Nhi			
028	Nguyễn Thị Thanh Thư			
029	Phan Hải Như			
030	Nguyễn Đỗ Vũ Yến			
035	Trần Linh Mai			
038	Bùi Thu Thủy			
051	Phạm Thị Huyền Trang			
063	Bùi Nguyễn Anh Thư			
068	Mai Uyên Nhi			
081	Phan Phương Oanh			
087	Đỗ Thùy Linh			
089	Nguyễn Thanh Hằng			
096	Vũ Thủy Tiên			
098	Trần Phương Thảo			
113	Hoàng Quý Lan			
114	Trần Thu Uyên			
121	Phạm Thùy Dung			
123	Nguyễn Thị Thu Hằng			
125	Nguyễn Lan Nhi			
127	Huỳnh Tuyết Duy			
152	Nguyễn Thị Phương Thanh			
154	Lê Thị Thảo Nguyên			
161	Nguyễn Đào Tuyên Dương			
164	Nguyễn Cao Hiếu Lam			
170	Ngô Thị Kiều Anh			
174	Huỳnh Bích Thoại			
175	Lê Phương Khánh Như			
191	Lê Thảo Linh			
220	Trần Thị Kiều Anh			
245	Phạm Thị Thùy Sâm			
253	Trần Thị Phương Linh			
254	Võ Đoàn Bảo Hà			
255	Trịnh Thị Trung Thu			
261	Ngô Thị Hiền			
266	Trịnh Yến Nhi			
270	Phạm Thị Hồng Nhung			
277	Nguyễn Đặng Khả Trâm			
171	Lê Hà Trang			
