= Miss World Vietnam =

Vietnamese beauty pageant

- Hoa hậu Thế giới Việt Nam
- Type: National beauty pageant
- Parent organization: Sen Vàng Entertainment
- Headquarters: Hồ Chí Minh City, Vietnam
- First edition: 2019
- Most recent edition: 2025
- Current titleholder: Phan Phương Oanh; Hà Nội
- Current president: Phạm Kim Dung
- Memberships: Miss World; Miss International
- Network: Vietnam Television
- Language: Vietnamese
- Predecessor: Huỳnh Trần Ý Nhi, Gia Lai
- Successor: Phan Phương Oanh, Hà Nội
- Website: missworldvn.com

Miss World Vietnam (Vietnamese: Hoa hậu Thế giới Việt Nam) is a national beauty pageant held to select a representative of Vietnam to participate in the Miss World pageant, one of the four largest beauty pageants in the world. Miss Vietnam, Miss Cosmo Vietnam and Miss World Vietnam are the three biggest beauty pageants, given the surplus of beauty pageants in Vietnam. The current titleholder is Phan Phương Oanh from Hanoi, who won on 29 March 2026.

== History ==
Vietnam first participated in Miss World 2002 and also successfully bid to host Miss World 2010 but later withdrew.

On 22 April 2019, Sen Vàng Entertainment held a press conference to announce the first-ever Miss World Vietnam pageant in 2019 and the winner will participate in Miss World 2019 in Thailand. Unlike any other competition in Vietnam, Miss World Vietnam will hold its final round twice, once in Hoa Binh Theater, Ho Chi Minh City and once in Tuần Châu island, Hạ Long, Quảng Ninh province.

In 2022, the competition returned, the first preliminary round of Miss World Vietnam 2022 taking place in Hà Nội, followed by contestants traveling to Thái Nguyên for several sub-competitions. The second and third preliminary rounds took place in Đà Nẵng and Hồ Chí Minh City respectively, after which the competition moved to Ninh Thuận for additional supplementary rounds. The final was originally scheduled to take place in Vũng Tàu city, Bà Rịa–Vũng Tàu province, but was later moved to Quy Nhơn city, Bình Định province.

== Editions ==
=== Titleholders ===
- Miss World Vietnam
- Miss Grand Vietnam
- Miss International Vietnam
- Miss Intercontinental Vietnam
- Removed

Year	Miss World Vietnam	1st Runner-Up	2nd Runner-Up	Date	Venue	#	Ref.
2019	Lương Thùy Linh; Cao Bằng	Nguyễn Hà Kiều Loan; Quảng Nam	Nguyễn Tường San; Hà Nội	3 August 2019	Cocobay, Đà Nẵng	40	
2020; 2021	Pageant not held due to the COVID-19 pandemic						
2022	Huỳnh Nguyễn Mai Phương; Đồng Nai	Lê Nguyễn Bảo Ngọc; Cần Thơ	Nguyễn Phương Nhi; Thanh Hóa	12 August 2022	MerryLand, Quy Nhơn, Bình Định	37	
2023	Huỳnh Trần Ý Nhi; Bình Định	Đào Thị Hiền; Nghệ An	Huỳnh Minh Kiên; Ninh Thuận	22 July 2023	MerryLand, Quy Nhơn, Bình Định	40	
2024	Lê Nguyễn Bảo Ngọc; Cần Thơ	—N/a		14 August 2025	LaChateau Hotel, Ho Chi Minh City	—N/a	
2025	Phan Phương Oanh; Hà Nội	Lê Phương Khánh Như; Khánh Hòa	Trương Tâm Như; Huế	29 March 2026	Military Zone 7 Stadium, Ho Chi Minh City	47	

=== Regional rankings ===
Province/City	Titles	Winning years
Hà Nội	1	2025
Gia Lai	1	2023 (Note: Bình Định province now has become a part of Gia Lai province)
Đồng Nai	1	2022
Cao Bằng	1	2019

=== Gallery ===
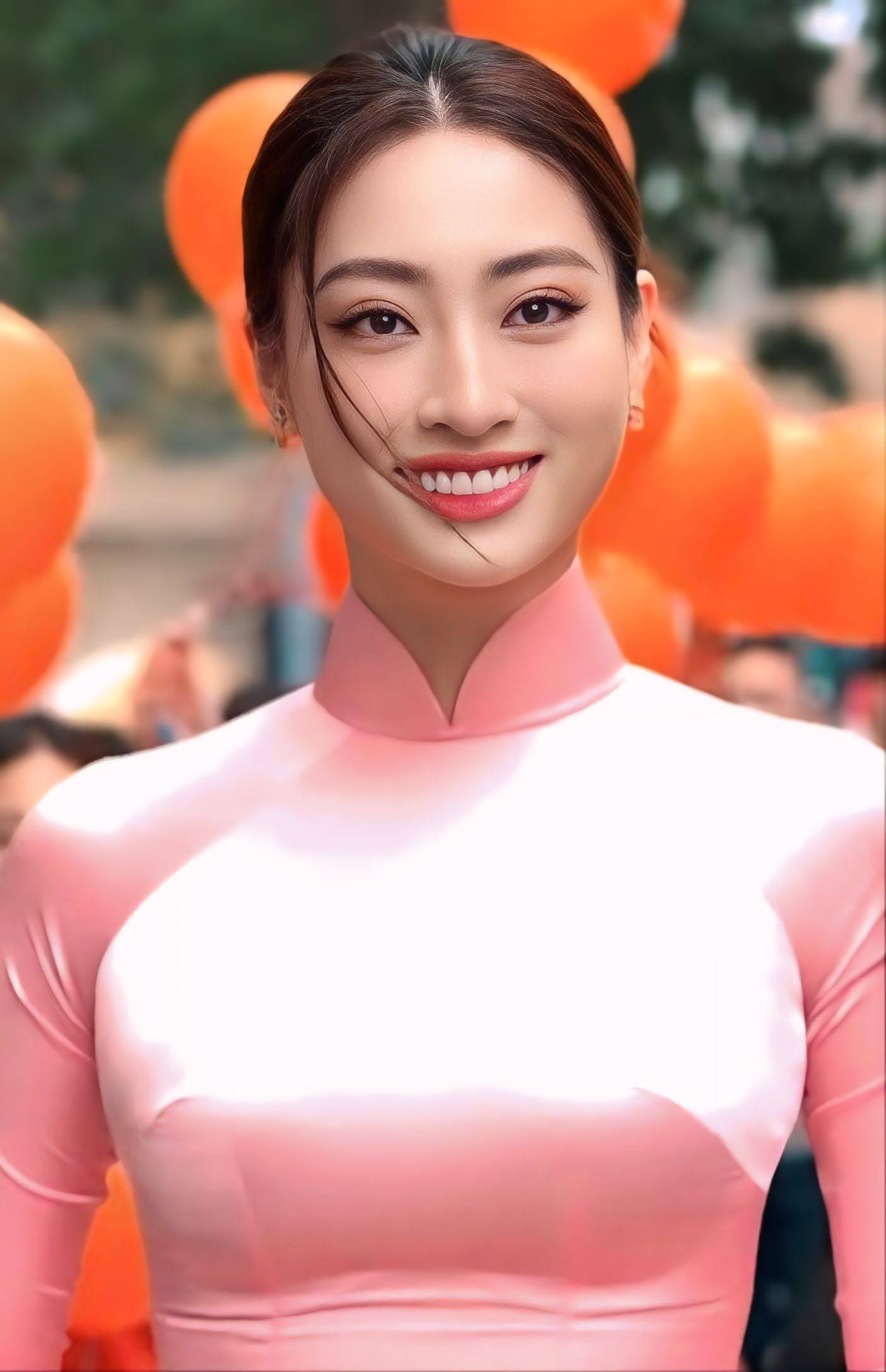
2019,Lương Thùy Linh

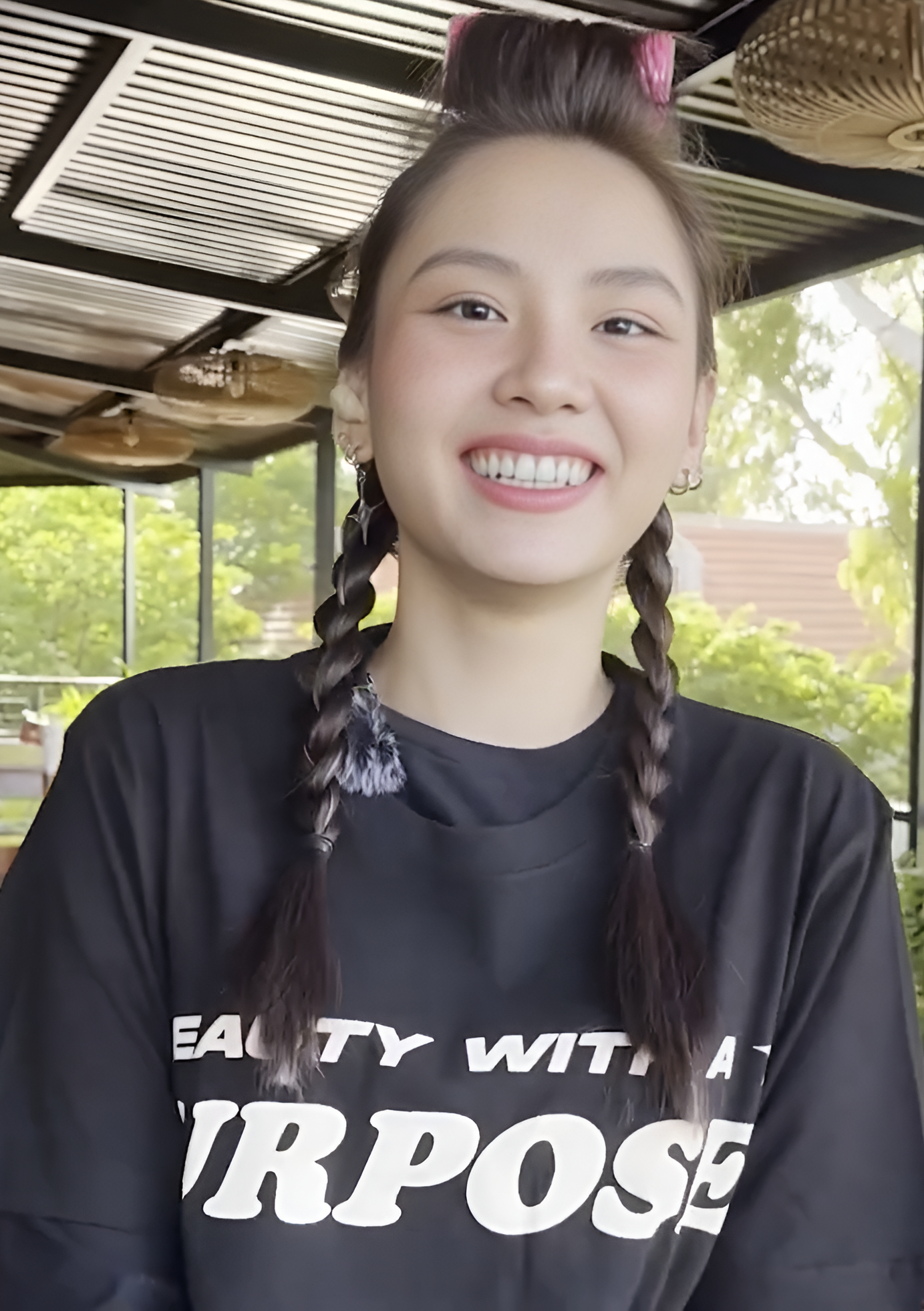
2022, Huỳnh Nguyễn Mai Phương

== Vietnam's representatives at international beauty pageants ==
Vietnam's representatives at Miss World

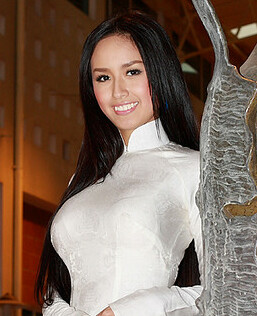
2006, Mai Phương Thúy

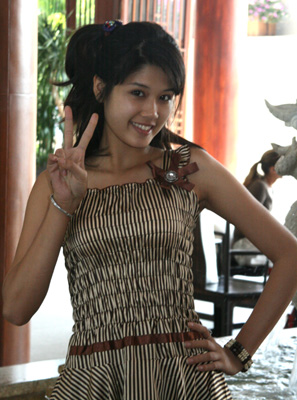
2007, Minh Thu

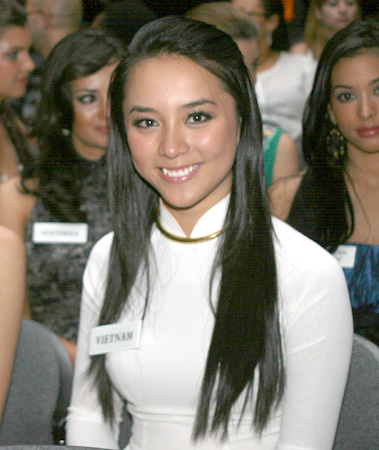
2008, Dương Trương Thiên Lý

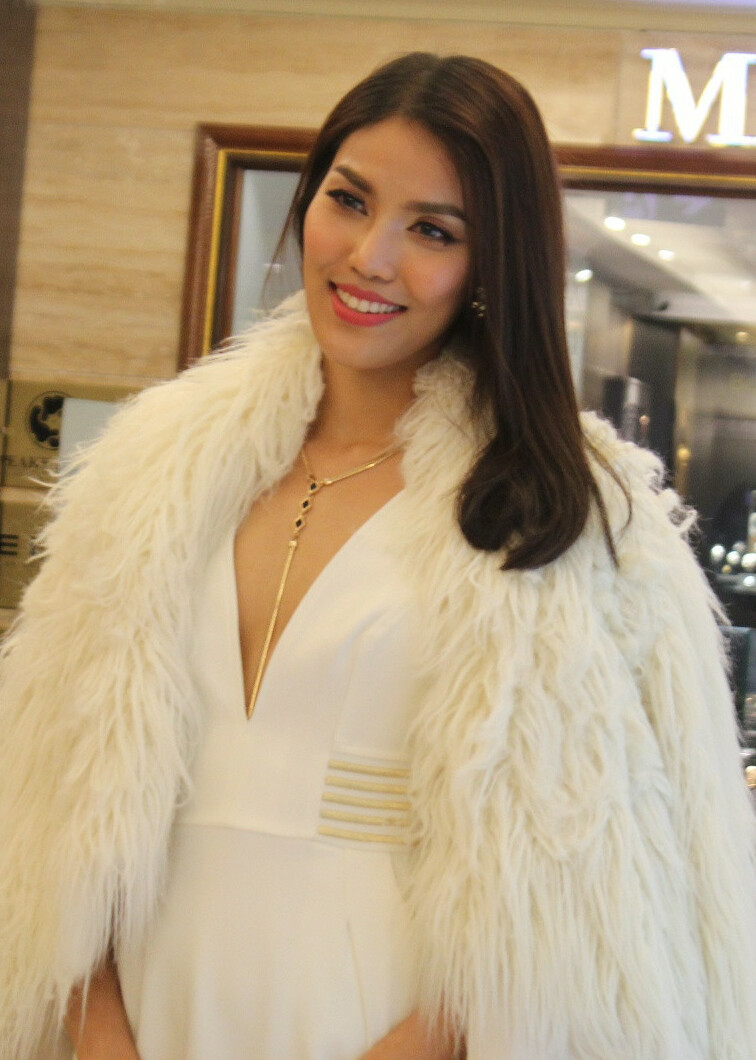
2015, Lan Khuê

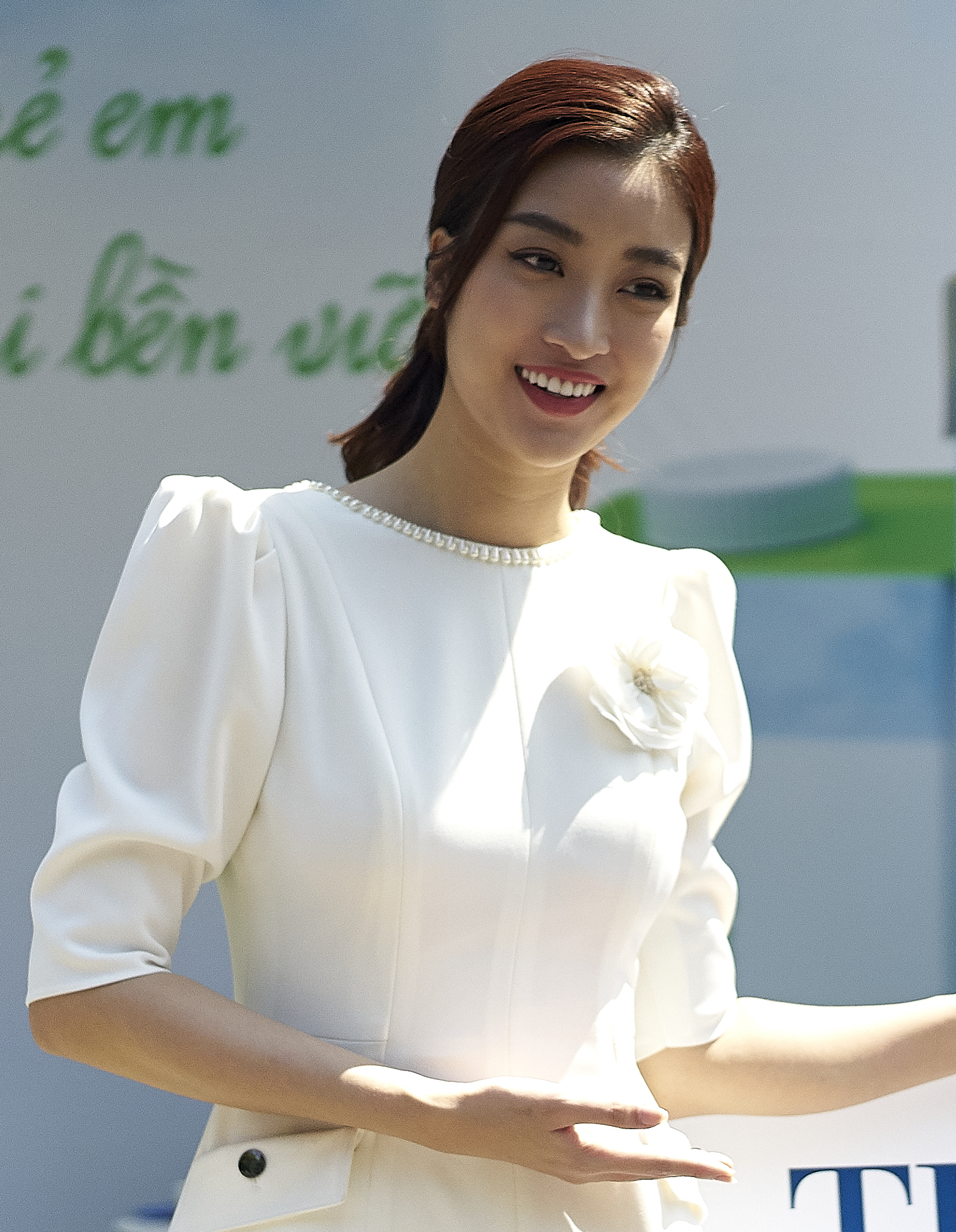
2017,Đỗ Mỹ Linh

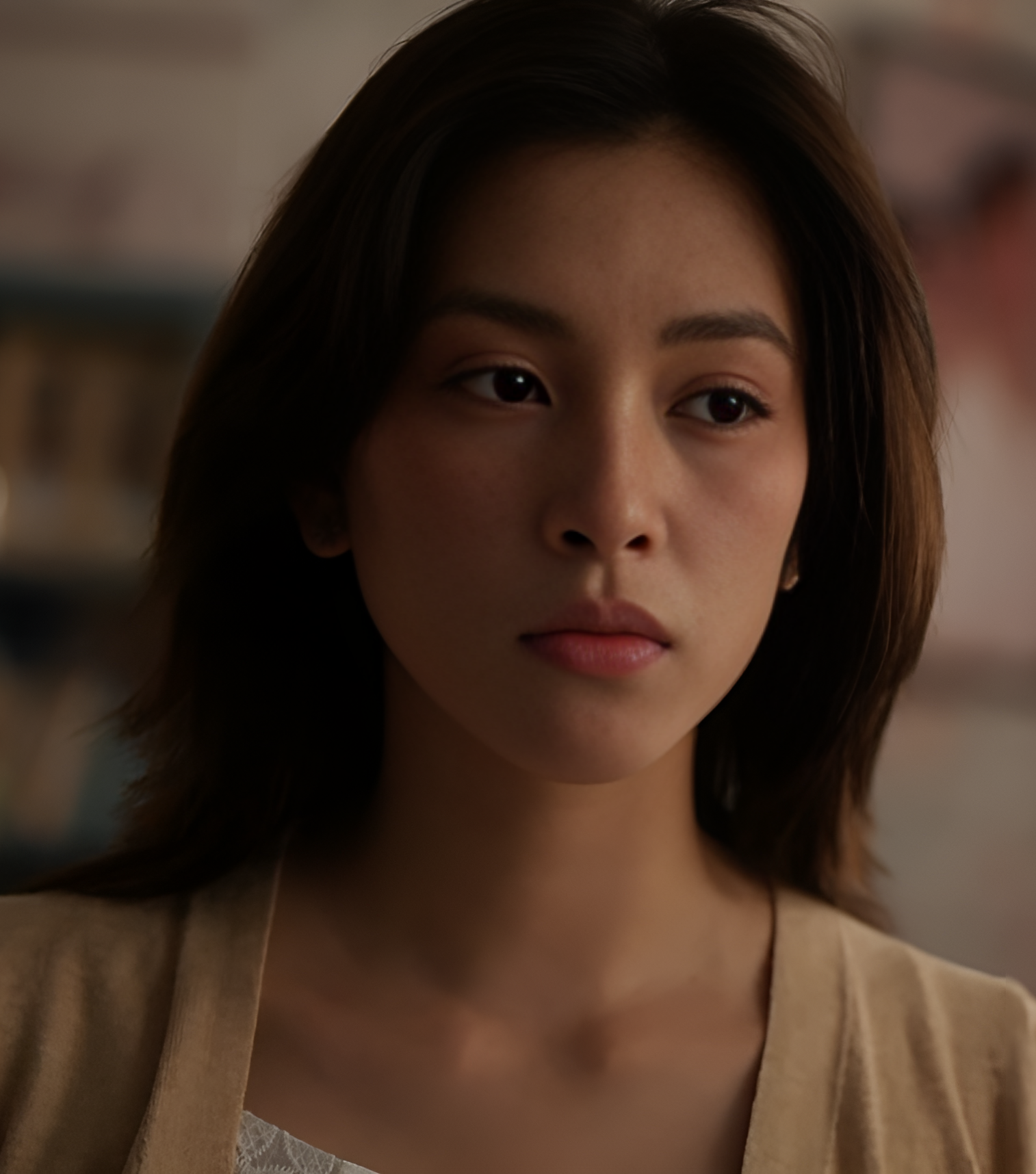
2018, Trần Tiểu Vy

=== Miss World ===
Miss Vietnam is Vietnam's first national pageant franchise at Miss World. However, because the contest is only held every two years in even years, in odd years Vietnam will choose representatives by handpick from other beauty contests.

In 2014, the Miss Ao Dai Vietnam – Road to Miss World 2014 contest was held. Trần Ngọc Lan Khuê won and attended Miss World 2015. In 2016, the winner of the contest was Trương Thị Diệu Ngọc, she attended Miss World 2016.

In 2019, Miss World Vietnam was established, sending Miss World Vietnam 2019 Lương Thùy Linh to Miss World 2019. Lê Nguyễn Bảo Ngọc handpicked to attend Miss World 2026 and was awarded the title Miss World Vietnam 2024.

Color keys

- : Declared as Winner
- : Finished as a runner-up or top 5
- : Finished as one of the finalists (top 10)
- : Finished as one of the semi-finalists (top 20)

Year	Miss World Vietnam	Province	National title	Result	Prize	Ref.
2027	Phan Phương Oanh	Hà Nội	Miss World Vietnam 2025	TBA		
2026	Lê Nguyễn Bảo Ngọc	Cần Thơ	Appointed: (1st Runner-Up of Miss World Vietnam 2022)	Top 6		
2025	Huỳnh Trần Ý Nhi	Bình Định	Miss World Vietnam 2023	Top 40		
2023	Huỳnh Nguyễn Mai Phương	Đồng Nai	Miss World Vietnam 2022	Top 40	1 Special Award: Winner – Multimedia Challenge	
2021	Đỗ Thị Hà	Thanh Hóa	Miss Vietnam 2020	Top 13	1 Special Award: Winner – Digital Challenge	
2019	Lương Thùy Linh	Cao Bằng	Miss World Vietnam 2019	Top 12	1 Special Award: 1st Runner-Up – Miss World Top Model	
2018	Trần Tiểu Vy	Quảng Nam	Miss Vietnam 2018	Top 30		
2017	Đỗ Mỹ Linh	Hà Nội	Miss Vietnam 2016	Top 40	2 Special Awards: Winner – Beauty with a Purpose; Winner – Head to Head Challenge	
2016	Trương Thị Diệu Ngọc	Đà Nẵng	Miss Aodai Vietnam 2016	Unplaced		
2015	Trần Ngọc Lan Khuê	Hồ Chí Minh City	Miss Ao Dai Vietnam 2014	Top 11	2 Special Awards: Winner – People's Choice Award; Winner – Fashion Designer Award	
2014	Nguyễn Thị Loan	Thái Bình	Appointed: (2nd Runner-Up of Miss Ethnic Vietnam 2013)	Top 25		(Note: Because the Miss Vietnam 2012 contest held in December was not in time to attend Miss World 2012 held in August, the 1st runner-up of Miss Vietnam 2010 Vũ Thị Hoàng My, selected to attend Miss World 2012. Miss Vietnam 2012 Đặng Thu Thảo refused to attend Miss World 2013 due to personal reasons. Finally, Miss Supranational Vietnam 2012 Lại Hương Thảo was chosen to attend. Thu Thảo was invited to attend Miss World 2014 because Miss Vietnam 2014 Nguyễn Cao Kỳ Duyên was involved in scandals, but she refused. Finally, Nguyễn Thị Loan selected to attend Miss World 2014.)
2014	Đặng Thu Thảo	Bạc Liêu	Miss Vietnam 2012	Do not participate		
2014	Nguyễn Cao Kỳ Duyên	Nam Định	Miss Vietnam 2014	Do not participate		
2013	Lại Hương Thảo	Quảng Ninh	Miss Fitness Vietnam 2012	Unplaced		
2013	Đặng Thu Thảo	Bạc Liêu	Miss Vietnam 2012	Do not participate		
2012	Vũ Thị Hoàng My	Đồng Nai	Appointed: (1st Runner-Up Miss Vietnam 2010)	Unplaced		
2011	Victoria Phạm Thuý Vy	California	Appointed: (2nd Runner-Up of Miss Vietnam World 2010)	Unplaced		(Note: Miss Vietnam 2010 Đặng Thị Ngọc Hân did not attend Miss World 2010 and 2011 due to personal reasons and Miss Vietnam World 2010 Lưu Thị Diễm Hương is attending Miss Earth 2010 hosted by Vietnam so she could not attend either. Finally, 1st runner-up Nguyễn Ngọc Kiều Khanh selected to attend Miss World 2010, and 2nd runner-up Phạm Thúy Vy Victoria selected to attend Miss World 2011.)
2011	Đặng Thị Ngọc Hân	Hà Nội	Miss Vietnam 2010	Do not participate		(Note: Miss Vietnam 2010 Đặng Thị Ngọc Hân did not attend Miss World 2010 and 2011 due to personal reasons and Miss Vietnam World 2010 Lưu Thị Diễm Hương is attending Miss Earth 2010 hosted by Vietnam so she could not attend either. Finally, 1st runner-up Nguyễn Ngọc Kiều Khanh selected to attend Miss World 2010, and 2nd runner-up Phạm Thúy Vy Victoria selected to attend Miss World 2011.)
2010	Nguyễn Ngọc Kiều Khanh	Munich	Appointed: (1st Runner-Up of Miss Vietnam World 2010)	Unplaced		(Note: Miss Vietnam 2010 Đặng Thị Ngọc Hân did not attend Miss World 2010 and 2011 due to personal reasons and Miss Vietnam World 2010 Lưu Thị Diễm Hương is attending Miss Earth 2010 hosted by Vietnam so she could not attend either. Finally, 1st runner-up Nguyễn Ngọc Kiều Khanh selected to attend Miss World 2010, and 2nd runner-up Phạm Thúy Vy Victoria selected to attend Miss World 2011.)
2010	Lưu Thị Diễm Hương	Hồ Chí Minh City	Miss Vietnam World 2010	Do not participate		(Note: Miss Vietnam 2010 Đặng Thị Ngọc Hân did not attend Miss World 2010 and 2011 due to personal reasons and Miss Vietnam World 2010 Lưu Thị Diễm Hương is attending Miss Earth 2010 hosted by Vietnam so she could not attend either. Finally, 1st runner-up Nguyễn Ngọc Kiều Khanh selected to attend Miss World 2010, and 2nd runner-up Phạm Thúy Vy Victoria selected to attend Miss World 2011.)
2010	Đặng Thị Ngọc Hân	Hà Nội	Miss Vietnam 2010	Do not participate		(Note: Miss Vietnam 2010 Đặng Thị Ngọc Hân did not attend Miss World 2010 and 2011 due to personal reasons and Miss Vietnam World 2010 Lưu Thị Diễm Hương is attending Miss Earth 2010 hosted by Vietnam so she could not attend either. Finally, 1st runner-up Nguyễn Ngọc Kiều Khanh selected to attend Miss World 2010, and 2nd runner-up Phạm Thúy Vy Victoria selected to attend Miss World 2011.)
2009	Trần Thị Hương Giang	Hải Dương	Miss Haiduong 2006	Top 16	1 Special Award: 1st Runner-Up – Miss World Top Model	
2008	Dương Trương Thiên Lý	Đồng Tháp	Appointed: (2nd Runner-Up of Miss Universe Vietnam 2008)	Unplaced	2 Special Awards: Winner – People's Choice Award; Winner – Miss Golf Sport	(Note: Miss Vietnam 2008 Trần Thị Thùy Dung, did not attend Miss World 2008 because she had not passed the High School Graduation Examination. The two runners-up, Phan Hoàng Minh Thư and Nguyễn Thụy Vân, were not permitted to attend by the Ministry of Culture, Sports and Tourism. Finally, the 1st runner-up of Miss Universe Vietnam 2008 Dương Trương Thiên Lý, selected to attend.)
2008	Trần Thị Thùy Dung	Đà Nẵng	Miss Vietnam 2008	Do not participate		(Note: Miss Vietnam 2008 Trần Thị Thùy Dung, did not attend Miss World 2008 because she had not passed the High School Graduation Examination. The two runners-up, Phan Hoàng Minh Thư and Nguyễn Thụy Vân, were not permitted to attend by the Ministry of Culture, Sports and Tourism. Finally, the 1st runner-up of Miss Universe Vietnam 2008 Dương Trương Thiên Lý, selected to attend.)
2007	Đặng Minh Thu	Nam Định	Appointed: (2nd Runner-Up of Miss Vietnam World 2007)	Unplaced		(Note: In 2007, the Miss Vietnam World contest was held, Ngô Phương Lan won but she did not compete in Miss World 2007 because she was busy with her studies, 1st runner-up Teresa Sam also did not participate because she was not a Vietnamese citizen, finally 2nd runner-up Đặng Minh Thu selected to attend.)
2007	Teresa Sam	Quảng Ninh	Appointed: (1st Runner-Up of Miss Vietnam World 2007)	Do not participate		(Note: In 2007, the Miss Vietnam World contest was held, Ngô Phương Lan won but she did not compete in Miss World 2007 because she was busy with her studies, 1st runner-up Teresa Sam also did not participate because she was not a Vietnamese citizen, finally 2nd runner-up Đặng Minh Thu selected to attend.)
2007	Ngô Phương Lan	Hà Nội	Miss Vietnam World 2007	Do not participate		(Note: In 2007, the Miss Vietnam World contest was held, Ngô Phương Lan won but she did not compete in Miss World 2007 because she was busy with her studies, 1st runner-up Teresa Sam also did not participate because she was not a Vietnamese citizen, finally 2nd runner-up Đặng Minh Thu selected to attend.)
2006	Mai Phương Thúy	Hà Nội	Miss Vietnam 2006	Top 17		
2005	Vũ Hương Giang	Hà Nội	Miss Jewelry Vietnam 2004	Unplaced		
2004	Nguyễn Thị Huyền	Hải Phòng	Miss Vietnam 2004	Top 15		
2003	Nguyễn Đình Thụy Quân	Hồ Chí Minh City	Miss Vietnam Photogenic 2003	Unplaced		
2002	Phạm Thị Mai Phương	Hải Phòng	Miss Vietnam 2002	Top 20		

=== Miss International ===
 Color keys
- : Declared as Winner
- : Ended as Runner-up or Top 5
- : Ended as one of the finalists (Top 8/10)
- : Ended as one of the semi-finalists (Top 15)

Year	Miss International Vietnam	Province	National title	Result	Prize	Ref.
2026	Lê Phương Khánh Như	Khánh Hòa	Appointed: (1st Runner-Up of Miss World Vietnam 2025)	TBA		
2023	Nguyễn Phương Nhi	Thanh Hóa	Appointed: (2nd Runner-Up of Miss World Vietnam 2022)	Top 15	Miss People’s Choice Award	
2019	Nguyễn Tường San	Hanoi	Appointed: (2nd Runner-Up of Miss World Vietnam 2019)	Top 8	Best National Costume	

=== Miss Intercontinental ===
 Color keys
- : Declared as Winner
- : Ended as Runner-up or Top 5
- : Ended as one of the finalists (Top 8/10)
- : Ended as one of the semi-finalists (Top 15)

Year	Miss Intercontinental Vietnam	Province	National title	Result	Prize	Ref.
2022	Lê Nguyễn Bảo Ngọc	Can Tho	Appointed: (1st Runner-Up of Miss World Vietnam 2022)	Winner	Miss Intercontinental Asia & Oceania	

== See also ==
- Miss Grand Vietnam
- Mr World Vietnam
- List of Vietnam representatives at international beauty pageants
