= Dalat Flower Festival =

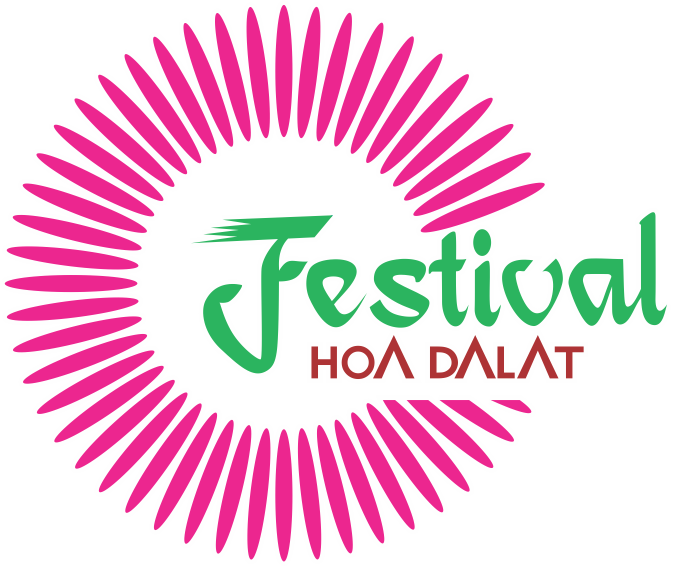
Logo of Dalat Flower Festival

Dalat Flower Festival (Vietnamese: Festival Hoa Đà Lạt) is a cultural festival which takes place every other year in Đà Lạt city, Lâm Đồng, Vietnam and some other localities in Lâm Đồng Province. The festival is held with the purpose of exhibiting flowers, vegetables and ornamental plants from the local as well as other regions within the country and many other countries in the world in order to attract visitors to come to Đà Lạt, promote economic development of the city. Dalat Flower Festival is also an activity honoring the value of flowers and floriculture, calling for investment in Đà Lạt flower industry as well as promoting a positive image of the city, the culture and the people of Đà Lạt.

== Dalat Flower Festival 2005 ==
• From 10 December to 18 December 2005 (9 days).
• Theme: Đà Lạt - A destination of colorful flowers.

This is the first flower festival to be held in the city which attracted to around 80,000 visitors.

== Dalat Flower Festival 2007 ==
• From 15 December to 22 December 2007 (8 days).
• Theme: Đà Lạt Flowers - I love you.

This event attracted to around 110,000 visitors.

== Dalat Flower Festival 2010 ==
• From 1 January to 4 January 2010 (4 days).
• Theme: Đà Lạt - City of thousands of flowers.

This is one of the national events responding to The 1000th Anniversary of Thăng Long - Hà Nội.

== Dalat Flower Festival 2012 ==
• From 31 December 2011 to 3 January 2012 (4 days).
• Theme: Đà Lạt - City of Flower Festival.

This festival attracted to 300,000 visitors.

== Dalat Flower Festival 2013 ==
• From 28 December 2013 to 2 January 2014 (6 days).
• Theme: Central Highlands - Echoes of the jungles.

This festival is one of four important events that took place in Đà Lạt in 2013 and 2014: the 120th anniversary of Dalat's formation and development, Đà Lạt - Lâm Đồng culture & tourism week 2013, National Tourism Year 2014 in Central Highlands – Đà Lạt, the firstst Vietnam – ASEAN UNESCO Heritage Festival 2013.

== Dalat Flower Festival 2015 ==
• From 29 December 2015 to 2 January 2016 (5 days).
• Theme: Đà Lạt - Multitude of flower colors.

== Dalat Flower Festival 2017 ==
• From 23 December 2017 to 27 December 2017 (5 days).
• Theme: Đà Lạt Flowers - The marvellous crystallization from the benign land.

This festival attracted to 500,000 visitors.

== Dalat Flower Festival 2019 ==
• From 20 December 2019 to 24 December 2019 (5 days).
• Theme: Đà Lạt and Flowers.

Dalat Flower Festival 2019 had the presence of Miss World Vietnam 2019, top 12 Miss World 2019 Lương Thùy Linh as the Image Ambassador and Miss World 2013 Megan Young as the Companion Ambassador. There was also have many other Misses sush as Miss Vietnam 2016 Đỗ Mỹ Linh, Miss Grand Vietnam 2019 Nguyễn Hà Kiều Loan, Miss International Vietnam 2019 Nguyễn Tường San, Runner-up Miss Vietnam 2014 Nguyễn Lâm Diễm Trang, Miss Grand International 2021 Nguyễn Thúc Thùy Tiên, Best Evening Gown of Miss Vietnam 2016 Trần Thị Thu Hiền,... as the different ambassadors of the festival. The opening night and closing night also had many famous singers and artists such as Tóc Tiên, Cẩm Ly, Hồ Trung Dũng, Thu Thảo, 218 Dance Crew,...

== Dalat Flower Festival 2022 ==
• From 1 November 2022 to 31 December 2022 (2 months).
• Theme: Đà Lạt – City of 4 Flower-Seasons.

After being postponed in 2021 due to the COVID-19 pandemic, the Da Lat Flower Festival returned with the largest scale ever, lasting for two months, with the goal of promoting local tourism after a difficult time. The festival program starts in November and lasts until 31 December 2022 with many special events. The opening ceremony was held on 18 December with the gathering of more than 5000 domestic and foreign artists, especially Mỹ Tâm, Hà Anh Tuấn, Võ Hạ Trâm, Quang Dũng, Đàm Vĩnh Hưng,... The closing night combined with the 2023 New Year countdown took place on 31 December 2022, with the performances of Ái Phương, Bảo Trâm Idol, Tuấn Hưng, Hồ Trung Dũng, MTV Band, Runner-up Miss Grand Vietnam 2022 Chế Nguyễn Quỳnh Châu,... and a 10-minute fireworks display at 0:00 on 1 January 2023.

Da Lat Flower Festival 2022 has attracted more than 1.5 million domestic and foreign tourists to attend, is a great success in promoting tourism and culture of the city as well as Lam Dong province.

== Da Lat Flower Festival 2024 ==
• From 5 to 31 December 2024 (27 days)

Dalat Flower Festival 2024 took place for 27 days, with many activities such as:

- Da Lat Vegetable and Flower Market magically crystallized from healthy soil
- Da Lat - Chuncheon International Cultural and Art Exchange Program (Korea)
- Flower and Heritage Street Carnaval
- Ao Dai Festival "Da Lat and You"
- Program "International exhibition of flowers and ornamental plants" within the framework of the program "Flower Space"
- Music concert "5AM Concert in Da Lat"
- Program "Display, introduction and trade promotion of OCOP products at Dalat Flower Festival 2024"
- Program "Chill Sparkling World Event - Flower Festival 2024"
- Fashion Week Classic and modern travel combine hair fashion
- Exhibition of Vietnamese fresh flower art works 2024
- SAM Tuyen Lam Winter Championship 2024 Golf Tournament
- Seminar "Suggesting strategies for developing the flower industry and members making plans to build sustainable flower industry development"

and more than 100 programs and concerts in Lam Dong province...

The opening night took place on the evening of 5 December, with the participation of famous musicians such as Mỹ Tâm, Trúc Nhân, Mono, Phương Mỹ Chi,... and more than 5,000 dancers and volunteers. Especially the performance of 1,000 drones recreating the heritage and landscape of Da Lat as well as the entire Lam Dong province. The opening night ended with a brilliant fireworks display that lit up the city's night sky.

The closing night took place on the evening of 31 December, combining a New Year's countdown with the performance of singers such as Hồ Ngọc Hà, Hồ Quỳnh Hương, Mỹ Linh, Quốc Thiên, Tạ Minh Tâm,... along with performers like Trần Ngọc Lan Khuê, Nguyễn Minh Tú, Hoàng Thùy, Nguyễn Phương Khánh, H'Hen Niê, Lương Thùy Linh, Nguyễn Thúc Thùy Tiên, Huỳnh Thị Thanh Thủy, Lê Hoàng Phương, Bùi Xuân Hạnh, Luma Russo, Tata Juliastrid,... And at exactly 00:00 on 1 January 2025, a 15-minute fireworks display closed the Dalat flower festival season, is also a greeting for the new year 2025.

The festival attracted more than 2 million visitors to Da Lat, bringing the total number of visitors for the whole year to 5 million for the city, and for the entire Lam Dong province to more than 10 million.
