= Phan Phương Oanh =

Vietnamese model

Phan Phuong Oanh
- Born: Phan Phương Oanh
- Education: National Economics University
- Occupation: Model
- Beauty pageant titleholder
- Title: Miss World Vietnam 2025
- Years active: 2022–
- Major competitions: Miss Vietnam 2022; (Top 10); Miss World Vietnam 2025; (Winner); Miss World 2027; (TBD)

Phan Phương Oanh is a Vietnamese beauty pageant titleholder who won Miss World Vietnam 2025 and reached the top 10 at Miss Vietnam 2022.

== Pageantry ==
Oanh graduated with a Bachelor's degree in international business from the National Economics University. She won Miss World Vietnam 2025, and was crowned by Huỳnh Trần Ý Nhi.

Awards and achievements
Preceded by Lê Nguyễn Bảo Ngọc	Miss World Vietnam; 2025	Incumbent
