= Nguyễn Tường San (born 2000) =

Vietnamese model and beauty queen (born 2000)

- Born: Nguyễn Tường San; 4 June 2000 (age 26); Hà Nội, Vietnam
- Education: RMIT University
- Height: 1.71 m (5 ft 7 1/2 in)
- Beauty pageant titleholder
- Title: 2nd Runner Up Miss World Vietnam 2019; Miss International Vietnam 2019
- Hair color: Black
- Eye color: Black
- Major competitions: Miss World Vietnam 2019 (2nd Runner Up); Miss International 2019 (Top 8)

Nguyễn Tường San (born 4 June 2000) is a Vietnamese model and beauty pageant titleholder who was crowned 2nd Runner Up Miss World Vietnam 2019. She represented Vietnam at the Miss International 2019 and placed in the Top 8.

== Background ==
Her mother and sister were both in the fashion industry. She is a close friend of actress Bảo Hân, the actress known for the movie Về Nhà Đi Con. She revealed that it was Bao Han who encouraged and convinced her to participate in the Miss World Vietnam 2019 contest.

== Career ==
=== Miss World Vietnam 2019 ===
In 2019, she participated in the first Miss World Vietnam 2019 contest and won the title of 2nd runner-up, along the winner is Lương Thùy Linh and 1st runner-up Nguyễn Hà Kiều Loan. With the title of 2nd runner-up Miss World Vietnam 2019, she was initially given the sash by 1st runner-up Miss Vietnam 2014 Nguyễn Trần Huyền My to represent Vietnam at Miss Intercontinental 2019. Later 2nd runner-up Miss Vietnam 2018 Nguyễn Thị Thúy An replaced her and she became Miss International Vietnam 2019.

=== Miss International 2019 ===
She became Vietnam's representative at the Miss International 2019 contest held in Japan and entered the Top 8 finalists, and received the Best National Costume.

Awards and achievements
Preceded by Phạm Ngọc Phương Linh	2nd Runner Up Miss World Vietnam; 2019	Succeeded by Nguyễn Phương Nhi
Preceded by Nguyễn Thúc Thùy Tiên	Miss International Vietnam; 2019	Succeeded by Phạm Ngọc Phương Anh
Preceded by (Ecuador) Michelle Huet	Best National Costume Miss International; 2019	Succeeded by (Uzbekistan) Nigina Fakhriddinova
