= Miss World Vietnam 2022 =

2nd Miss World Vietnam pageant

- Date: 12 August 2022
- Presenters: Nguyên Khang; Thiên Vũ; Thụy Vân
- Entertainment: Đức Tuấn; Hồ Ngọc Hà; Lệ Quyên; Erik; Phương Mỹ Chi; Lona
- Venue: Merry Land, Quy Nhơn, Bình Định
- Broadcaster: VTV2; VTV3
- Entrants: 66
- Placements: 20
- Winner: Huỳnh Nguyễn Mai Phương; Đồng Nai

Miss World Vietnam 2022 was the second edition of the Miss World Vietnam pageant. It was held on 12 August 2022, at Merry Land, Quy Nhơn, Bình Định, Vietnam. Miss World Vietnam 2019 Lương Thùy Linh crowned her successor Huỳnh Nguyễn Mai Phương at the end of the event. Huỳnh Nguyễn Mai Phương represented Vietnam at Miss World 2023.

== Results ==
=== Placements ===
Color keys

- Declared as the winner in an international pageant.
- Ended as runner-up in an international pageant.
- Ended as finalist or semi-finalist in an international pageant.
- Unplaced.

Placement	Contestant	International pageant	International placement
Miss World Vietnam 2022	216 – Huỳnh Nguyễn Mai Phương	Miss World 2023	Top 40
1st Runner-Up	228 – Lê Nguyễn Bảo Ngọc (§)	Miss Intercontinental 2022	Winner
2nd Runner-Up	116 – Nguyễn Phương Nhi	Miss International 2023	Top 15
Top 5	104 – Nguyễn Thị Phương Linh; 182 – Nguyễn Thùy Linh		
Top 10	068 – Trần Thị Bé Quyên; 088 – Nguyễn Thị Lệ Nam Em (¥); 267 – Bùi Khánh Linh; 419 – Lê Nguyễn Ngọc Hằng; 516 – Nguyễn Khánh My		
Top 20	005 – Phạm Thị Hồng Thắm; 018 – Phan Lê Hoàng An; 169 – Phạm Thùy Trang; 237 – Vũ Thị Lan Anh; 392 – Hồ Thị Yến Nhi; 426 – Lê Trúc Linh; 526 – Nguyễn Trần Khánh Linh; 535 – Nguyễn Ánh Dương; 548 – Đặng Thị Kim Thoa; 556 – Võ Thị Thương		

- (§) - placed into the Top 5 by Beauty With A Purpose
- (¥) - placed into the Top 10 by People's Choice (Final)

=== Special awards ===
Special Award		Contestant
People's Choice	Final	088 – Nguyễn Thị Lệ Nam Em
People's Choice	Preliminary	499 – Vũ Như Quỳnh
Multimedia	Final	088 – Nguyễn Thị Lệ Nam Em
Multimedia	Preliminary	088 – Nguyễn Thị Lệ Nam Em
Miss Áo dài		548 – Đặng Thị Kim Thoa
Best Skin		116 – Nguyễn Phương Nhi
Miss Tea-the-First		189 – Lý Thị Thanh Thúy
Queen Talks		216 – Huỳnh Nguyễn Mai Phương

== Contestants ==
=== Top 38 contestants in the final round ===
No.	Contestants	Age	Height	Hometown	Placement
005	Phạm Thị Hồng Thắm	18	1.72 m (5 ft 7 1/2 in)	Quảng Ngãi	Top 20
018	Phan Lê Hoàng An	22	1.70 m (5 ft 7 in)	Tiền Giang	Top 20
035	Lương Thành Minh Châu	21	1.77 m (5 ft 9 1/2 in)	Ho Chi Minh City	
068	Trần Thị Bé Quyên	21	1.75 m (5 ft 9 in)	Bến Tre	Top 10
088	Nguyễn Thị Lệ Nam Em	26	1.72 m (5 ft 7 1/2 in)	Tiền Giang	Top 10
104	Nguyễn Thị Phương Linh	22	1.76 m (5 ft 9 1/2 in)	Quảng Trị	Top 5
116	Nguyễn Phương Nhi	20	1.70 m (5 ft 7 in)	Thanh Hóa	2nd Runner-up
121	Phan Thu Trang	24	1.70 m (5 ft 7 in)	Ninh Bình	
127	Phan Thị Vân	20	1.71 m (5 ft 7 1/2 in)	Hanoi	
146	Nguyễn Hoài Phương Anh	21	1.70 m (5 ft 7 in)	Bà Rịa–Vũng Tàu	
169	Phạm Thùy Trang	22	1.70 m (5 ft 7 in)	Haiphong	Top 20
182	Nguyễn Thùy Linh	22	1.73 m (5 ft 8 in)	Hanoi	Top 5
189	Lý Thị Thanh Thúy	21	1.76 m (5 ft 9 1/2 in)	Thái Nguyên	
208	Lương Hồng Xuân Mai	23	1.74 m (5 ft 8 1/2 in)	Ho Chi Minh City	
215	Lưu Thanh Phương	22	1.74 m (5 ft 8 1/2 in)	Ho Chi Minh City	
216	Huỳnh Nguyễn Mai Phương	23	1.70 m (5 ft 7 in)	Đồng Nai	Miss World Vietnam 2022
228	Lê Nguyễn Bảo Ngọc	21	1.85 m (6 ft 1 in)	Cần Thơ	1st Runner-up
237	Vũ Thị Lan Anh	21	1.76 m (5 ft 9 1/2 in)	Nam Định	Top 20
267	Bùi Khánh Linh	20	1.76 m (5 ft 9 1/2 in)	Bắc Giang	Top 10
278	Hồ Ngọc Khánh Linh	22	1.73 m (5 ft 8 in)	Đắk Lắk	
305	Nguyễn Đoàn Hải Yến	22	1.69 m (5 ft 6 1/2 in)	Kiên Giang	
319	Trần Thị Hà Vy	24	1.68 m (5 ft 6 in)	Nghệ An	
345	Dương Thanh Hà	20	1.75 m (5 ft 9 in)	Khánh Hòa	
369	Nguyễn Thị Phương Nga	21	1.74 m (5 ft 8 1/2 in)	Khánh Hòa	
378	Phan Thị Thanh Huyền	21	1.73 m (5 ft 8 in)	Kiên Giang	
392	Hồ Thị Yến Nhi	18	1.80 m (5 ft 11 in)	Thừa Thiên Huế	Top 20
400	Đinh Thị Hoa	21	1.73 m (5 ft 8 in)	Đắk Lắk	
408	Đỗ Linh Chi	23	1.73 m (5 ft 8 in)	Hanoi	
419	Lê Nguyễn Ngọc Hằng	19	1.74 m (5 ft 8 1/2 in)	Ho Chi Minh City	Top 10
426	Lê Trúc Linh	21	1.76 m (5 ft 9 1/2 in)	Bà Rịa–Vũng Tàu	Top 20
433	Nguyễn Thị Thu Hằng	21	1.69 m (5 ft 6 1/2 in)	Thái Bình	
486	Phạm Khánh Nhi	22	1.69 m (5 ft 6 1/2 in)	Ho Chi Minh City	
499	Vũ Như Quỳnh	23	1.68 m (5 ft 6 in)	Ninh Bình	
516	Nguyễn Khánh My	23	1.73 m (5 ft 8 in)	Hanoi	Top 10
535	Nguyễn Ánh Dương	21	1.70 m (5 ft 7 in)	Hanoi	Top 20
526	Nguyễn Trần Khánh Linh	20	1.69 m (5 ft 6 1/2 in)	Lâm Đồng	Top 20
548	Đặng Thị Kim Thoa	19	1.74 m (5 ft 8 1/2 in)	Long An	Top 20
556	Võ Thị Thương	20	1.67 m (5 ft 5 1/2 in)	Quảng Nam	Top 20

=== Top 45 contestants in the preliminary ===
No.	Contestants	Age	Height (cm)	Hometown
232	Nguyễn Ngọc Thanh Ngân	22	1.71 m (5 ft 7 1/2 in)	Ho Chi Minh City
256	Nguyễn Thục Ngân	20	1.74 m (5 ft 8 1/2 in)	Ho Chi Minh City
281	Nguyễn Thị Hoài Ngọc	21	1.72 m (5 ft 7 1/2 in)	Bắc Giang
295	Cao Thị Phương Anh	20	1.68 m (5 ft 6 in)	Bắc Kạn
335	Vũ Thị Ngọc Trúc	21	1.68 m (5 ft 6 in)	Bình Dương
445	Đặng Dương Hà Tiên	23	1.71 m (5 ft 7 1/2 in)	Kiên Giang
569	Nguyễn Lê Trung Nguyên	21	1.69 m (5 ft 6 1/2 in)	Ho Chi Minh City

=== Top 66 contestants in the preliminary ===
No.	Contestants	Age	Height (cm)	Hometown
026	Nguyễn Hương Ly	23	1.74 m (5 ft 8 1/2 in)	Haiphong
052	Nguyễn Trần Vân Đình	23	1.70 m (5 ft 7 in)	Ho Chi Minh City
072	Phạm Thị Ánh Vương	19	1.73 m (5 ft 8 in)	Bình Thuận
081	Đỗ Trần Hải Gia Linh	24	1.73 m (5 ft 8 in)	Bình Định
096	Phạm Thị Ngọc Vy	20	1.71 m (5 ft 7 1/2 in)	An Giang
102	Mai Hiếu Ngân	21	1.69 m (5 ft 6 1/2 in)	Ho Chi Minh City
118	Hoàng Mai Linh	23	1.66 m (5 ft 5 1/2 in)	Thanh Hóa
135	Trần Phương Nhi	18	1.69 m (5 ft 6 1/2 in)	Gia Lai
138	Nguyễn Thị Thanh Trúc	19	1.76 m (5 ft 9 1/2 in)	Ho Chi Minh City
142	Nguyễn Thị Kim Chi	20	1.67 m (5 ft 5 1/2 in)	Bắc Ninh
151	Lý Ngọc Mẫn	21	1.65 m (5 ft 5 in)	Hanoi
171	Mai Ngọc Minh	20	1.75 m (5 ft 9 in)	Hanoi
175	Nguyễn Vĩnh Hà Phương	18	1.69 m (5 ft 6 1/2 in)	Ho Chi Minh City
195	Đặng Trần Thủy Tiên	22	1.70 m (5 ft 7 in)	Haiphong
202	Trần Nhật Lệ	21	1.68 m (5 ft 6 in)	Quảng Ninh
215	Lưu Thanh Phương	22	1.74 m (5 ft 8 1/2 in)	Ho Chi Minh City
245	Đoàn Nguyễn Phương Uyên	22	1.71 m (5 ft 7 1/2 in)	Ho Chi Minh City
319	Trần Thị Hà Vy	24	1.68 m (5 ft 6 in)	Nghệ An
322	Đỗ Phương Anh	21	1.65 m (5 ft 5 in)	Quảng Ninh
382	Nguyễn Phương Dung	22	1.73 m (5 ft 8 in)	Ho Chi Minh City
408	Đỗ Linh Chi	23	1.73 m (5 ft 8 in)	Hanoi
447	Trần Huyền Ly	24	1.71 m (5 ft 7 1/2 in)	Thanh Hóa
457	Vũ Minh Trang	21	1.68 m (5 ft 6 in)	Thanh Hóa
503	Nguyễn Thị Xuân Tuyền	20	1.66 m (5 ft 5 1/2 in)	Gia Lai

== Judges ==
- Trần Hữu Việt - Journalist and poet
- Hà Kiều Anh - Actress and Miss Vietnam 1992
- Trần Tiểu Vy - Miss Vietnam 2018
- Lương Thùy Linh - Miss World Vietnam 2019
- Vũ Lệ Quyên - Singer
- Lê Ngọc Minh Hằng - Singer and actress
- Karolina Bielawska - Miss World 2021 from Poland
- Nguyễn Thúc Thùy Tiên - Miss Grand International 2021 from Vietnam
