= Maria Cepero =

Puerto Rican model and beauty pageant titleholder

- Born: Maria del Mar Cepero Jiménez; 1 January 1998 (age 28); Aibonito, Puerto Rico
- Education: University of Puerto Rico
- Height: 1.65 m (5 ft 5 in)
- Beauty pageant titleholder
- Title: Miss Intercontinental Puerto Rico 2024; Miss Intercontinental 2024
- Hair color: Brown
- Eye color: Brown
- Major competitions: Miss World America 2023 (4th Runner-up); Miss Mundo de Puerto Rico 2024 (Unplaced); Miss Intercontinental Puerto Rico 202 (Winner); Miss Intercontinental 2024 (Winner)

Maria del Mar Cepero Jiménez (born 1 January 1998) is a Puerto Rican model, entrepreneur, advocate, lawyer and beauty pageant titleholder, She was crowned Miss Intercontinental Puerto Rico 2024 and is the fifth Puerto Rican to be crowned Miss Intercontinental in Egypt.

== Early life ==
Maria Cepero was born in 1998 in Puerto Rico and currently resides in Connecticut, US. She is a law graduate from the University of Puerto Rico School of Law. Cepero speaks Spanish, English, Portuguese, and French.

Cepero is the founder of the Flowers Fund Project, a non-profit organization that supports women through entrepreneurship and aims to change lives in the most vulnerable communities in Puerto Rico. She owns a health business that promotes healthy lifestyles through holistic physical and mental well-being practices.

== Career ==
=== Miss World America 2023 ===
On October 5, 2023, she represented Connecticut at Miss World America 2023 and competed against 45 other candidates at the Meydenbauer Theater in Bellevue, Washington, US.

=== Miss Intercontinetal 2024 ===
On May 8, 2024, she was crowned Miss Intercontinental Puerto Rico 2024 at the Fairmont Lobby Hotel in San Juan, Carolina, Puerto Rico, becoming the fifth Puerto Rican to win Miss Intercontinental.

Awards and achievements
| Preceded by (Thailand) Chatnalin Chotjirawarachat | Miss Intercontinental; 2024 | Succeeded by (Russia) Varvara Yakovenko |
