= Chatnalin Chotjirawarachat =

Thai model, fashion designer and beauty titleholder (born 1998)

Chatnalin Chotijirawarachat ฉัตร์ณลิณ โชติจิรวราฉัตร
- Born: December 14, 1997 (age 28); Kamphaeng Phet, Thailand
- Education: Bangkok University
- Beauty pageant titleholder
- Title: Miss Intercontinental 2023; Miss Intercontinental Thailand 2023
- Major competitions: Miss Grand Kamphaeng Phet 2017 (Winner); Miss Grand Thailand 2017 (1st Runner-up); Miss Universe Thailand Prachuap Khiri Khan 2023 (Winner); Miss Universe Thailand 2023 (1st Runner-up); Miss Intercontinental 2023 (Winner)

Chatnalin Chotijirawarachat (Thai: ฉัตร์ณลิณ โชติจิรวราฉัตร; born December 14, 1997) is a Thai beauty pageant titleholder, model and influencer. She was crowned Miss Intercontinental 2023 and previously won the title of 1st Runner-up at Miss Grand Thailand 2017 and Miss Universe Thailand 2023.

== Early life ==
Chotjirawarachat was born on December 14, 1997 in Kamphaeng Phet. She completed her secondary education at Kamphaeng Phet Pittayakhom School and received her bachelor's degree in Communication Arts from Bangkok University.

== Career ==
=== Miss Grand Thailand 2017 ===
She won Miss Grand Kamphaeng Phet 2017 and represented the province in Miss Grand Thailand 2017 and won the title of 1st Runner-up.

=== Miss Universe Thailand 2023 ===
After being appointed as Miss Universe Thailand Prachuap Khiri Khan 2023, she continued to participate in Miss Universe Thailand 2023 and assumed the title of 1st runner-up following the resignation and forfeiture of Kirana Jasmine Chewter and Veena Praveenar Singh.

=== Miss Intercontinental 2023 ===
She was then appointed as Miss Intercontinental Thailand 2023, where she continued to represent her nation on the international stage and ultimately won Miss Intercontinental 2023.

Awards and achievements
Preceded by (Vietnam) Lê Nguyễn Bảo Ngọc	Miss Intercontinental; 2023	Succeeded by (Puerto Rico) Maria Cepero
Preceded by (Phuket province) Amanda Jensen	Miss Intercontinenatal Thailand; 2023	Succeeded by (Phatthalung province) Arabella Gregory
