= Lê Nguyễn Bảo Ngọc =

Vietnamese model

- Born: 18 June 2001 (age 25); Cần Thơ, Vietnam
- Education: Ho Chi Minh City International University (BBA)
- Occupation: Model
- Height: 1.86 m (6 ft 1 in)
- Beauty pageant titleholder
- Title: Miss World Vietnam 2024; Miss Intercontinental 2022
- Hair color: Black
- Eye color: Brown
- Major competitions: Miss Vietnam 2020 (Top 22); Miss World Vietnam 2022 (1st Runner-Up); Miss Intercontinental 2022 (Winner); Miss World 2026 (Top 6)

Lê Nguyễn Bảo Ngọc (born 18 June 2001) is a Vietnamese beauty pageant titleholder and model. She gained recognition after finishing as the first runner-up of Miss World Vietnam 2022 and then was crowned Miss Intercontinental 2022 in Sharm El Sheikh, Egypt. In 2025, she was announced as Vietnam's representative at Miss World 2026.

She is the first Vietnamese to be crowned Miss Intercontinental and is one of the former Miss Intercontinental winners to participate in a Big Four beauty pageant.

== Biography ==
Ngọc was born on June 18, 2001, in Cần Thơ, Vietnam. She was born into a family with a father who is a military doctor. He is a Colonel, Specialist II, Head of the Department of Orthopedic Trauma Surgery at Military Hospital 121.

== Education ==
She received the Asian Scholarships and Educational Exchanges for Development (SEED) scholarship sponsored by the Canadian government, the Venture Leader scholarship by the Quest Venture Singapore investment fund and NUS Enterprise Summer Programme on Entrepreneurship 2023 Scholarship by National University of Singapore, summer course at École de management de Normandie in France. and the title of "5 Good Students". She received a scholarship from the University of New South Wales.

She became a research assistant right after finishing her first year and co-authored an economic project that won third prize at the Student Research Conference. She is the leader of an economic project team that reached the top 10 of the Innovation and Entrepreneurship Competition organized by the Association of Vietnamese Scientists and Experts (AVSE Global) and sponsored by the State Committee for Overseas Vietnamese (Ministry of Foreign Affairs); At the same time, she is one of 40 female entrepreneurs selected in the program of the US Consulate.

She is a speaker and consultant for more than 100 programs in and outside Vietnam. Ngọc graduated with a BA (Hons) in Business and Management from the University of the West of England; she is studying for an international master's degree here. She is studying International Business at Western Sydney University.

== Beauty contest ==
The first beauty contest she participated in was Miss Vietnam 2020, where she entered the top 22. In 2022, she participated in Miss World Vietnam 2022 and won the first runner-up, along with other secondary awards: Beauty with a Purpose, Fashion Designer Award, top 5 Miss Talent, top 6 Head to Head Challenge and top 8 Queen Talks.

After Miss World Vietnam 2022, she was chosen to represent Vietnam at the 50th edition of Miss Intercontinental, taking place on October 14, 2022, in Sharm El Sheikh, Egypt. In the 50th anniversary of the contest, she surpassed 70 contestants and was crowned by the previous winner, Cindy Obeñita of the Philippines.

In 2025, she was announced to represent Vietnam at the 73rd Miss World, with the title awarded "Miss World Vietnam 2024".

== Career ==
=== COP29 ===
In November 2024, she attended the United Nations Climate Change Conference (COP29) in Baku, Azerbaijan, which brought together more than 67,000 delegates from 198 countries, the European Union, and many global leaders. At the Extreme Hangout COP29 Pavilion, with the theme “Mekong: Turning Vulnerabilities to Opportunities”, delegate Bảo Ngọc, representing 'Gen Zero', gave an in-depth presentation on climate change in the Mekong River basin.

She also participated in the event “UN Youth Traveling Green” organized by the Brazilian Ministry of Tourism, where she represented Vietnam to share the potential for sustainable tourism development in the Mekong Delta. With "Children and Youth Pavilion", Bảo Ngọc shares about the impact of climate change in the Mekong Delta and the "Local Conference of Youth Vietnam" (LCOY) initiative. In her efforts to combat climate change, she was invited to attend the “UN Secretary-General’s Roundtable for Youth”.

The 'Gen Zero' program, founded by Ngọc, promotes youth participation in the 17 Sustainable Development Goals, especially on climate action. At the 1st World Student Festival, the dialogue session “Students Taking Action on Climate” organized by Gen Zero and the Ho Chi Minh City Student Association attracted more than 1,000 students from 11 countries, raising awareness and initiating the “Green Commitment” with the slogan “Youth For Sustainability”.

=== Other ===
She received the National Volunteer Award in 2024 from the Central Committee of Ho Chi Minh Communist Youth Union. She was nominated for the 2024 Outstanding Young Vietnamese Face Award; the winner is Thùy Tiên. Certificate of Merit from the Ca Mau Youth Union for outstanding achievements in the work of the Union and the youth movement to participate in environmental protection and climate change response in Cà Mau province. In 2025, Thanh Thủy and Ngọc were honored to receive the Asia Humanitarian Influencer Award at the Impact Influence Festival Awards 2025 event held in Malaysia.

Ngọc is the coordinator, co-drafting the 2023 Vietnam Youth Declaration on Climate Change. She is the Global Ambassador of Earth Day in Vietnam, attracting the participation of more than 6,000 volunteers, helping to collect 35 tons of waste. In Vietnam International Defense Exhibition 2024, Ngọc, Thùy Tiên, Thanh Thủy be attended. Ngọc was chosen to introduce coffee culture during the meeting between Prime Minister of Vietnam Phạm Minh Chính and Prime Minister of Kyrgyzstan Adylbek Kasymaliev on March 7, 2025.

In celebration of the 50th anniversary of Vietnam's reunification on April 30, 2025, Vietnam held a military parade, Ngọc attended the parade.

Awards and achievements
Preceded by Huỳnh Trần Ý Nhi	Miss World Vietnam; 2024	Succeeded by Phan Phương Oanh
Preceded by (Philippines) Cindy Obeñita	Miss Intercontinental; 2022	Succeeded by (Thailand) Chatnalin Chotjirawarachat
Preceded by (Philippines) Cindy Obeñita	Miss Intercontinental Asia & Ocean; 2022	Succeeded by (Vietnam) Lê Nguyễn Ngọc Hằng
Preceded by Trần Hoàng Ái Nhi	Miss Intercontinental Vietnam; 2022	Succeeded by Lê Nguyễn Ngọc Hằng
Preceded by Nguyễn Hà Kiều Loan	1st Runner-Up Miss World Vietnam; 2022	Succeeded by Đào Thị Hiền
