= Huỳnh Trần Ý Nhi =

Vietnamese beauty pageant winner

- Born: Huỳnh Trần Ý Nhi; June 18, 2002 (age 24); Bình Định, Vietnam
- Education: Ho Chi Minh City International University; University of Sydney
- Height: 175 cm (5 ft 9 in)
- Beauty pageant titleholder
- Title: Miss World Vietnam 2023
- Hair color: Black
- Eye color: Black
- Major competitions: Miss Student Bình Định 2023; (2nd Runner-up); Miss World Vietnam 2023; (Winner); Miss World 2025; (Top 40)

Huỳnh Trần Ý Nhi is a Vietnamese model and beauty pageant titleholder who was crowned Miss World Vietnam 2023. She will represent Vietnam at the Miss World 2025 pageant.

== Education ==
Nhi studied at Tăng Bạt Hổ Secondary School and Hoài Ân High School and was a student majoring in Business Administration at the Ho Chi Minh City International University. She is studying abroad at the University of Sydney. Nhi was crowned 2nd Runner-up at the Miss Student Bình Định 2023.

== Career ==
=== Miss World Vietnam 2023 ===
In 2023, Nhi registered for the Miss World Vietnam contest. Before the final night, she won the special awards of Fashion Beauty, Top 16 Beauty With a Purpose, Top 5 Beauty of the Sea and Top 10 Beauty of Courage. In the final night of the contest held on July 22 in Bình Định, Nhi was officially crowned and crowned by Miss World Vietnam 2022 Huỳnh Nguyễn Mai Phương and will represent Vietnam at Miss World 2025.

=== Miss World 2025 ===
After being crowned Miss World Vietnam 2023, she had a Send-off Ceremony on April 23, 2025, and will represent Vietnam at Miss World 2025 held in India.

== Personal life ==
After being crowned Miss World Vietnam 2023, Nhi made public her 6-year relationship with her boyfriend Nguyễn Anh Kiệt, born in 2002 and a student at Ho Chi Minh City University of Architecture. When asked if her boyfriend needed to change anything after she was crowned, she replied: "I am now in a new position [...] Surely my boyfriend must also have rapid changes and progress to be able to keep up with me." This statement has become a topic of debate in Vietnamese media and social networks in this country. Anh Kiệt later went on social networks to explain that he was not affected by his girlfriend's answers, and at the same time advised the online community to "have a more objective view" of her.

In an interview after her coronation, Nhi continued to cause controversy with her statement about her peers. According to her, while Vietnamese youth of her age spent their time sleeping, playing, and drinking milk tea, she participated in the Miss pageant; therefore, she is now more mature, has become a Miss, and has a job while other young people are still students or both studying and working. This statement continues to be a controversial topic on social networking sites.

On August 1, 2023, Nhi and two Runners-up of the Miss World Vietnam 2023 pageant visited patients at a hospital. The image of her and the runners-up in elaborate costumes with crowns continued to become a controversial topic on social networking sites before the organizers confirmed that this was not a charity activity but an activity of contestants in the Top 3 of the competition scheduled with the sponsor.

After 10 days of being crowned Miss World Vietnam 2023, the number of boycott groups (Anti-fan) increased, with some groups having more than 600,000 members.

== Comments and reviews ==
After Nhi's statement about the answer related to Hàn Mặc Tử and Quang Trung, Dr. Đoàn Hương commented that she lacked knowledge and could not simply have said something wrong. Chairman of the Vietnam Writers' Association Nguyễn Quang Thiều said that Miss Ý Nhi did not mean to be arrogant in this answer, but was simply not properly educated; "Many people her age have very cultured and knowledgeable behaviors. The lack of culture makes her look ridiculous... Nowadays, most 4-year-old children already know who to greet before coming home from kindergarten."

Awards and achievements
Preceded by Huỳnh Nguyễn Mai Phương	Miss World Vietnam; 2023	Succeeded by Lê Nguyễn Bảo Ngọc
