= National Economics University =

Public research institution in Vietnam

- Đại học Kinh tế Quốc dân
- Former names: School of Economics and Finance
- Type: University (public school)
- Established: 25 January 1956; 70 years ago
- President: Prof. Phạm Hồng Chương
- Students: 45,000 ̣̣̣̣
- Location: 207 Vong Town street, Dong Tam ward, Hai Ba Trung district, Hanoi city, Vietnam country 20.999722°N 105.844814°E
- Nickname: Stanford Phố Vọng
- Website: en.neu.edu.vn

National Economics University (NEU; Vietnamese: Đại học Kinh tế Quốc dân) is a public research university in Hanoi, Vietnam. Founded in 1956, its history and influence have made it the leading universities in Economics, Public Administration and Business Administration in Vietnam. NEU is now chairing a network of more than 40 universities in Vietnam in economics and business administration. It is also a prestigious research and consultation center with its publications and consulting works to the government of Vietnam on policy making and to the business community on business development. Since its establishment, NEU has paid special attention to developing international academic cooperation. It has formed partnership relationship with over 100 institutions and organizations from 30 countries, including Australia, Belgium, Cambodia, Canada, China, France, Germany, Japan, Laos, Netherlands, South Korea, Taiwan, United Kingdom, Italy and United States. The university has been involved in research projects in cooperation with large governmental organizations and international financial institutions such as the Japanese International Cooperation Agency (JICA), the Foundation of Vietnam Development Forum (VDF), the National Graduate Institute for Policy Studies (GRIPS), the World Bank (WB), the Asian Development Bank (ADB), the Department for International Development (DFID - UK), and Ausaid (Australia). Notable alumni include Nguyễn Xuân Phúc, 10th President and former Prime Minister of Vietnam; Dương Công Minh, Chairman of Sacombank and Trần Đình Long, Chairman of Hòa Phát Group.

In 1956, the university was established by the government decree, originally named Central School of Economics and Finance.

In 1958, the school changed its name to University of Economics and Finance, under the supervision of Ministry of Education.

In 1962, Prime Minister Phạm Văn Đồng signed a decree to separate the Faculty of International Relations from the University of Economics and Finance and establish a new university called University of Foreign Affairs and Foreign Trade, under the supervision of Ministry of Foreign Affairs. This later led to the foundation of two reputable institutions, Foreign Trade University, and Diplomatic Academy of Vietnam.

In 1965, the name was changed to University of Economic Planning.

In 1985, it was renamed National Economics University. It has kept this name since then.

For more than 60 years, the university has received numerous prestigious awards from the Vietnamese and Lao governments. More than 100,000 Bachelor's students, 10,000 Master's students, and 1,400 PhD students graduated from the university.

On November 15, 2024, Deputy Prime Minister Lê Thành Long, on behalf of the Prime Minister, signed a decision to elevate the National Economics University (Trường Đại học Kinh tế Quốc dân) to National Economics University (Đại học Kinh tế Quốc dân).

The government has mandated that the university reorganize its structure and operations in accordance with the Law on Higher Education and other relevant legal regulations.

The existing university council, its chairperson, and the university president will continue performing their duties as stipulated under current regulations until the Minister of Education and Training establishes the new university council, appoints the council chairperson, and recognizes the president of the newly upgraded National Economics University.

With this decision, the National Economics University becomes the ninth university-level institution in Vietnam. The other eight include: - Vietnam National University, Hanoi - Vietnam National University, Ho Chi Minh City - Thai Nguyen University - Hue University - University of Danang - Hanoi University of Science and Technology - University of Economics Ho Chi Minh City - Duy Tan University

Previously, the university council of the National Economics University approved a resolution to establish three constituent schools: the School of Business, the School of Technology, and the School of Economics and Public Management.

Currently, the National Economics University has approximately 25,000 full-time students and over 1,200 faculty and staff members. It offers 60 undergraduate programs and 28 doctoral programs. As part of its development strategy for the 2021–2030 period, the university aims to rank among Vietnam's top five universities.

Under the 2018 Law on Higher Education, "university" (đại học) and "college" (trường đại học) are distinct concepts. A college provides education in multiple disciplines but does not encompass diverse fields, whereas a university offers education across various fields, with each field having multiple disciplines. Therefore, a university typically comprises several colleges.

According to Decree 99/2019/ND-CP, which details the implementation of amendments to the Law on Higher Education, institutions must meet specific conditions to transition from a college to a university-level institution.

== Schools and Faculties ==
Schools	1. NEU Business School; 2. NEU Graduate School; 3. School of Accounting and Auditing; 4. School of Banking and Finance; 5. School of Trade and International Economics; 6. International School of Management and Economics; 7. School of Information Technology and Digital Economics; 8. School of Sustainable Development; 9. School of Advanced Education Programs
Faculties	1. Faculty of Real Estate and Resources Economics; 2. Faculty of Insurance; 3. Faculty of Investment; 4. Faculty of Tourism and Hospitality; 5. Faculty of Planning and Development; 6. Faculty of Economics; 7. Faculty of Human Resource Management; 8. Faculty of Management Science; 9. Faculty of Law; 10. Faculty of Political Studies; 11. Faculty of Marketing; 12. Faculty of Environment, Climate Change and Urban Studies; 13. Faculty of Foreign Languages for Economics; 14. Faculty of Business Management; 15. Faculty of Statistics; 16. Faculty of Informatics for Economics; 17. Faculty of Mathematical Economics
Institute	Institute of Public Policy and Management

== Presidents ==
- Phạm Văn Đồng (Honorary President)
- Nguyễn Văn Tạo: 1956-1960
- Đoàn Trọng Truyến: 1960-1963
- Hồ Ngọc Nhường: 1963-1968
- Prof. Đỗ Khiêm: 1968-1970
- Prof. Mai Hữu Khuê: 1970-1982
- Phạm Hữu Niên: 1982-1984
- Dr. Sc. Lê Văn Toàn: 1984-1985
- Prof. Nguyễn Pháp: 1985-1987
- Prof. Vũ Đình Bách: 1987-1994
- Prof. Lương Xuân Quỳ: 1994-1999
- Prof. Nguyễn Đình Hương: 1999-2002
- Prof. Lê Du Phong: 2002-2003
- Prof. Nguyễn Văn Thường: 2003-2008
- Prof. Nguyễn Văn Nam: 2008-2013
- Assoc. Prof. Phạm Mạnh Hùng: 2013-2014
- Prof. Trần Thọ Đạt: 2014-2018
- Assoc. Prof. Phạm Hồng Chương: 2019-

== Notable alumni ==
- Nguyễn Xuân Phúc - 10th President, former Prime Minister of Vietnam
- Đặng Phong - Vietnamese Economic Historian
- Ngô Văn Dụ - Member of the Politburo of the CPV, Secretary of the Central Committee of the CPV, Chairman of the Central Inspection Commission of the CPV
- Lê Hữu Nghĩa - Director of Ho Chi Minh National Academy of Politics
- Nguyễn Đức Kiên - Vice Chairman of National Assembly of Vietnam
- Đỗ Hoài Nam - Chairman of Vietnam Academy of Social Sciences
- Somphao Phaysith - Member of the Central Committee of the Lao People's Revolutionary Party, Governor of the Bank of the Lao P.D.R
- Nguyễn Hòa Bình - Chairman of Vietcombank
- Phan Đăng Tuất - Head of Department of Enterprise Renovation and Development, Ministry of Industry and Trade of Vietnam, Chairman of Sabeco
- Nguyễn Thị Nga - Chairman of SeABank, Chairman of BRG Group
- Thái Hương - Vice Chairman & CEO of Bac A Bank, Founder & Advisor of TH Food Chain JSC
- Vũ Văn Tiền - Chairman of An Binh Bank, Former Chairman of Geleximco Group
- Dương Công Minh - Chairman of Sacombank
- Trần Đình Long - Chairman of Hoa Phat Group
- Nguyễn Đình Thắng - Chairman of LienViet Postbank
- Nguyễn Mạnh Hùng - Vietnamese Minister of Information and Communications, Chairman & CEO of Viettel
- Hồ Đức Phớc - Head of State Audit Office of Vietnam
- Hồ Lê Nghĩa - Chairman of Vinataba
- Nguyễn Thanh Phượng - Chairman of Viet Capital Bank
- Trương Đình Anh - Board Member & CEO of FPT Corporation, CEO of FPT Telecom
- Chu Thị Thanh Hà - Chairwoman of FPT Software
- Trần Xuân Kiên - Founder & CEO of Tran Anh Digital World JSC
- Phạm Duy Hiếu - CEO of Startup Vietnam Foundation, CEO of An Binh Bank
- Đỗ Thị Hà - Miss Vietnam 2020
- Bùi Phương Nga - 1st Runner-Up Miss Vietnam 2018
- Nông Thúy Hằng - Miss Ethnic Vietnam 2022
