= Huỳnh Nguyễn Mai Phương =

Vietnamese beauty pageant titleholder

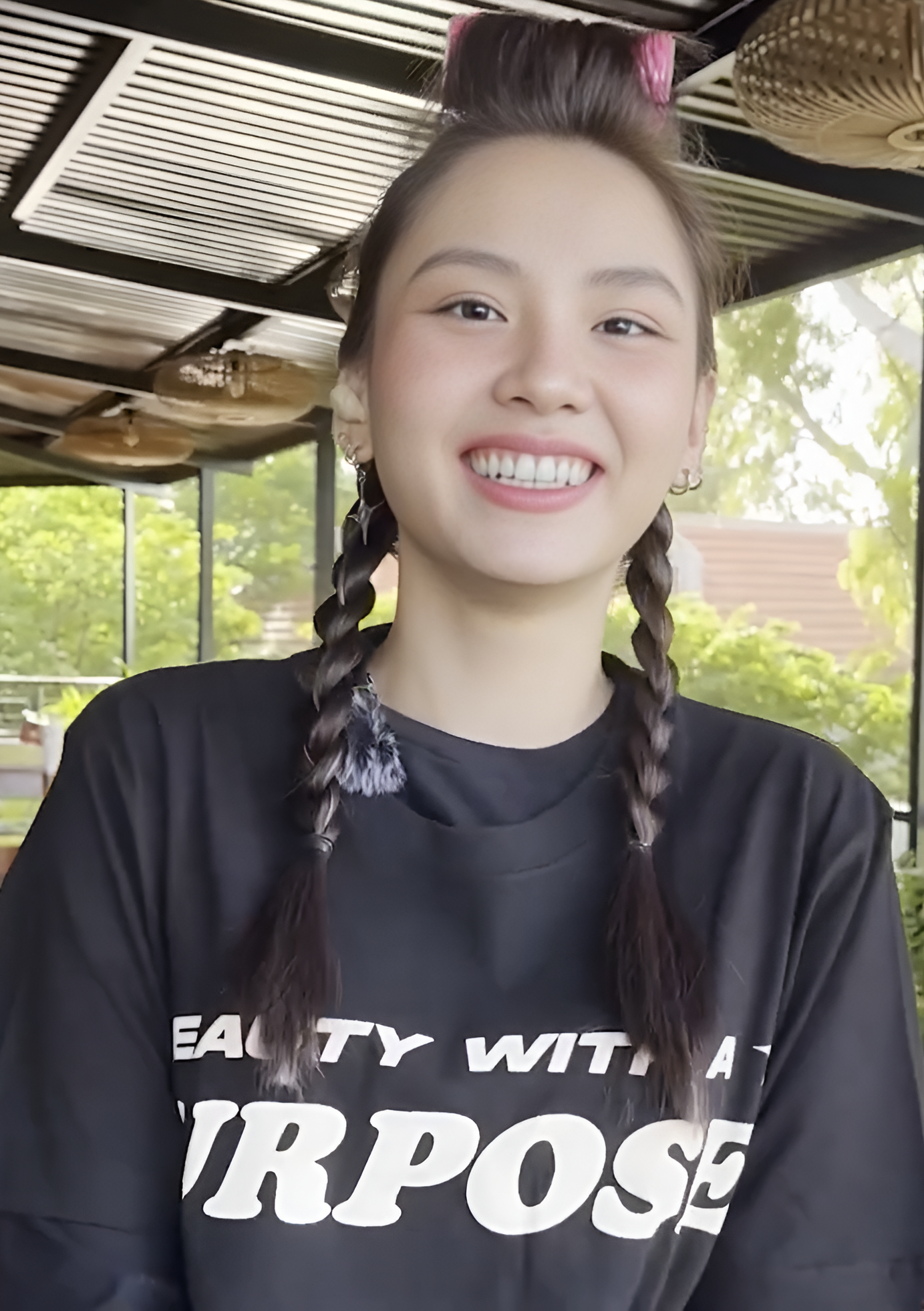
- Huỳnh Nguyễn Mai Phương in 2023
- Born: Đồng Nai, Vietnam
- Beauty pageant titleholder
- Title: Miss World Vietnam 2022
- Major competitions: Miss Vietnam 2020; (Top 5); Miss World Vietnam 2022; (Winner); Miss World 2023; (Top 40)

Huỳnh Nguyễn Mai Phương is a Vietnamese beauty pageant titleholder who won Miss World Vietnam 2022, and represented Vietnam at Miss World 2023, where she reached the top 40.

== Pageantry ==
=== Miss Đồng Nai University 2018 ===
Mai Phương won Miss Dongnai University 2018.

=== Miss Vietnam 2020 ===
At Miss Vietnam 2020, she reached the top five, and won the Beauty with a Purpose award.

=== Miss World Vietnam 2022 ===
In 2022, she won Miss World Vietnam 2022.

=== Miss World 2023 ===
She represented Vietnam at the Miss World 2023 pageant. She won the Multimedia Challenge and reached the top 40.

Awards and achievements
Preceded by Lương Thùy Linh	Hoa hậu Thế giới Việt Nam; 2022	Succeeded by Huỳnh Trần Ý Nhi
Preceded by Đỗ Thị Hà	Miss World Vietnam; 2022	Succeeded by Huỳnh Trần Ý Nhi
Preceded by Olivia Yacé	Multimedia Winner; 2023	Succeeded by Suchata Chuangsri; Issie Princesse (Dominican Republic) Mayra Delgado; Andrea Nikolić
