= Đỗ Hà =

Vietnamese beauty pageant titleholder

Đỗ Thị Hà
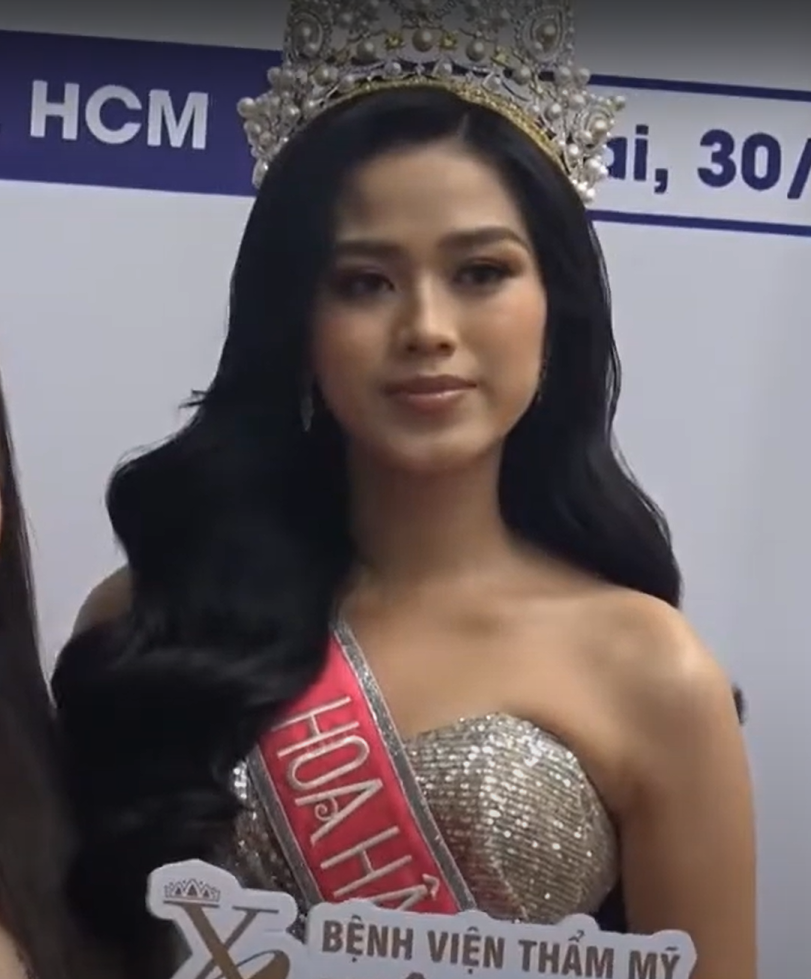
- Đỗ Thị Hà in 2020
- Born: 20 July 2001 (age 25); Hậu Lộc, Thanh Hóa, Vietnam
- Education: National Economics University
- Spouse: Nguyễn Viết Vương (m. 2025)
- Beauty pageant titleholder
- Title: Miss Vietnam 2020
- Major competitions: Miss Vietnam 2020 (Winner); Miss World 2022 (Top 13 - Digital Media Challenge winner)

Đỗ Thị Hà (born 20 July 2001) is a Vietnamese beauty pageant titleholder who won Miss Vietnam 2020. She was selected to represent Vietnam at Miss World 2022.

== Early life ==
Đỗ Thị Hà was born in 2001 in Cầu Village, Cầu Lộc Commune, Hậu Lộc District, Thanh Hóa Province. She is the youngest and has three siblings.

Hà attended high school in the selective class A1 at Hậu Lộc 3 High School in Thanh Hóa. She studied and graduated with a major in Business Law from the National Economics University.

== Pagentry ==
She won Miss Vietnam 2020 on 20 November 2020 at the Phu Tho Indoor Stadium in Ho Chi Minh City. She reached the top five of Fast Track Beach Beauty and Top Model, and won the Multimedia award. She was selected to represent Vietnam at Miss World 2022.

Awards and achievements
Preceded by Lương Thùy Linh	Miss World Vietnam; 2022	Succeeded by Huỳnh Nguyễn Mai Phương
Preceded by Trần Tiểu Vy	Miss Vietnam; 2020	Succeeded by Huỳnh Thị Thanh Thủy
