= Miss World 2027 =

74th Miss World pageant

- Date: 2027
- Venue: Tanzania
- Returns: Estonia; Tunisia

Miss World 2027 will be the 74th edition of the Miss World pageant, scheduled to be held in Tanzania.

Joheirry Mola of the Dominican Republic will crown her successor at the end of the event.

== Overview ==
=== Location and date ===
On 20 April 2026, Julia Morley, Chairperson and CEO of the Miss World Organization, signed a hosting agreement with the government of Tanzania, officially confirming that the 74th edition of Miss World will take place in Tanzania in 2027.

== Contestants ==
The confirmed contestants are as follows:

Country/Territory	Contestant	Age (Note: Ages at the time of the pageant)	Hometown	Ref.
Bolivia	Ash Castro	19	Cochabamba	
Botswana	Magdeline Modipane	26	Tonota	
Canada	Alexa Grant	24	Toronto	
China	Ophelia He	22	Shenzhen	
Colombia	María José Rojas	21	Medellín	
Côte d'Ivoire	Louisette N'Guessan	23	Bouaké	
Czech Republic	Lucie Pisková	23	Prague	
England	Tabitha Bennett	23	Lancashire	
Equatorial Guinea	Estrella Juana Mikue	23	Ebibeyin	
Estonia	Eliisa-Adele Toode	18	Tallinn	
Finland	Jenna Rintamäki	26	Kangasala	
Gibraltar	Janelle Ticknell-Smith	24	Westside	
Guatemala	Naïda Estubier	26	Zacapa	
India	Sadhvi Sail	25	Panaji	
Indonesia	Alda Callista	22	Tulungagung Regency	
Ireland	Iris Ruddy	26	Lucan	
Italy	Sofia Viola	22	Pozzuoli	
Jamaica	Matea Mahal Smith	25	Kingston	
Kazakhstan	Shadiyara Baykenova	23	Almaty	
Malta	Suwaida Bugeja	20	Żejtun	
Nepal	Deepmala Dhakal	24	Hong Kong	
Portugal	Bruna Nogueira	21	Benfica	
Slovenia	Elin Kos	21	Poljane nad Škofjo Loko	
Sri Lanka	Shwetha Liyanaduwa	21	Colombo	
Trinidad and Tobago	Ysabella Thomas	26	Port of Spain	
Tunisia	Oumayma Haouet	28	Tunis	
Uganda	Almorie Nagayi	20	Masaka	
United States	Jade Glab	26	Belmar	
Venezuela	Sofia Pascuzzo	25	Caracas	
Vietnam	Phương Oanh Phan	23	Hanoi	
Wales	Ellie Corcoran	23	Anglesey	
