= Miss Vietnam 2020 =

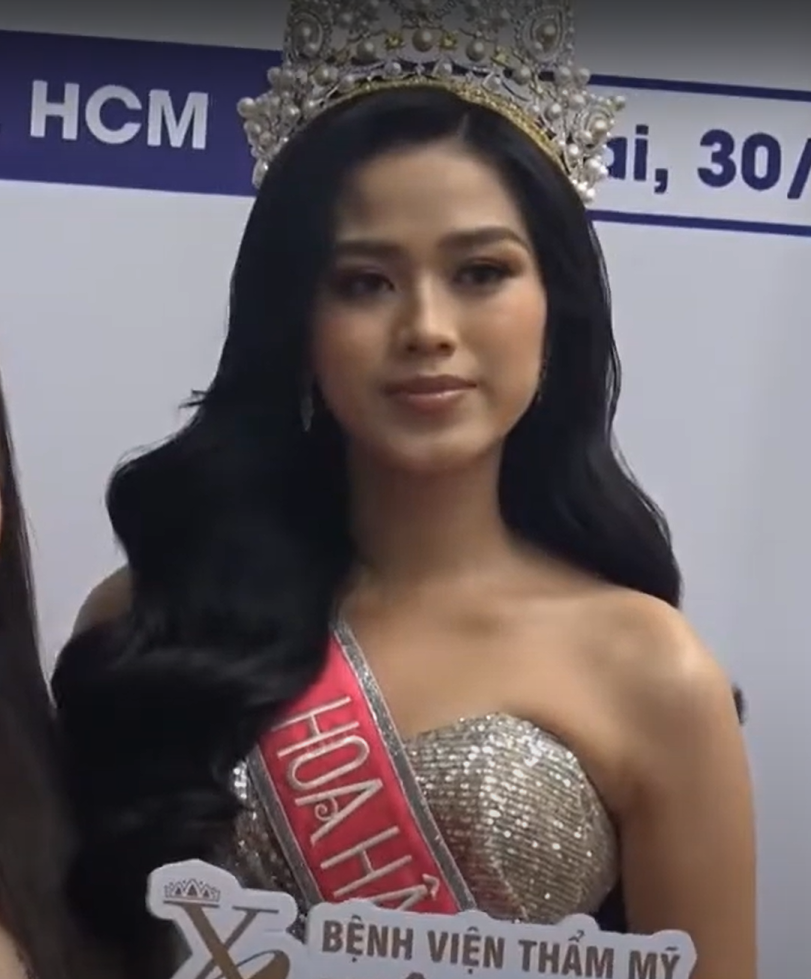
- Miss Vietnam 2020 Đỗ Thị Hà
- Date: November 20, 2020
- Presenters: Vũ Mạnh Cường; Danh Tùng; Lương Thùy Linh
- Entertainment: Nguyễn Hà Kiều Loan; Phúc Bồ; Hoàng Thùy Linh; Binz; Dương Triệu Vũ; Minh Tuyết; Đàm Vĩnh Hưng
- Venue: Phu Tho Indoor Stadium, District 11, Ho Chi Minh City
- Broadcaster: VTV3; VTV9
- Entrants: 35
- Placements: 22
- Winner: Đỗ Thị Hà; Thanh Hóa

Miss Vietnam 2020 was the 17th edition of the Miss Vietnam pageant. It was held on November 20, 2020, at Phu Tho Indoor Stadium, Ho Chi Minh City, Vietnam. Miss Vietnam 2018 Trần Tiểu Vy crowned her successor Đỗ Thị Hà at the end of the event.

The pageant crowned the Vietnam representatives to compete in four of international beauty pageants: Miss World 2021, Miss International 2022, Miss Grand International 2020 and Miss Intercontinental 2021.

== Results ==
=== Placements ===
Color keys

- Declared as the winner in an International pageant.
- Ended as Runner-up in an International pageant.
- Ended as finalist or semifinalist in an International pageant.
- Unplaced.

Final result	Contestant	International pageant	International placement
Miss Vietnam 2020	245 – Đỗ Thị Hà	Miss World 2021	Top 13
1st Runner-Up	045 – Phạm Ngọc Phương Anh	Miss International 2022	Unplaced
2nd Runner-Up	068 – Nguyễn Lê Ngọc Thảo	Miss Grand International 2020	Top 20
Top 5	093 – Huỳnh Nguyễn Mai Phương	Miss World 2023	Top 40
Top 5	146 – Phạm Thị Phương Quỳnh		
Top 10	088 – Hoàng Bảo Trâm; 151 – Lê Thị Tường Vy; 228 – Đặng Vân Ly; 319 – Doãn Hải My; 433 – Nguyễn Thị Thu Phương		
Top 15	018 – Võ Ngọc Hồng Đào; 171 – Nguyễn Thị Cẩm Đan; 182 – Nguyễn Thị Bích Thùy		
Top 15	278 – Vũ Quỳnh Trang	Miss Tourism International 2025	Top 7
Top 15	445 – Nguyễn Thị Thanh Thủy		
Top 22	025 – Lê Nguyễn Bảo Ngọc	Miss Intercontinental 2022	Winner
Top 22	025 – Lê Nguyễn Bảo Ngọc	Miss World 2026	Top 6
Top 22	052 – Bùi Thị Thanh Nhàn; 069 – Phù Bảo Nghi; 077 – Lê Trúc Linh; 138 – Đậu Hải Minh Anh		
Top 22	175 – Trần Hoàng Ái Nhi	Miss Intercontinental 2021	Unplaced
Top 22	322 – Phạm Thị Ngọc Ánh		

=== Special awards ===
Giải thưởng	Thí sinh
Miss Áo dài	151 - Lê Thị Tường Vy
Best Skin	146 - Phạm Thị Phương Quỳnh
Most Positive Contributions	088 - Hoàng Bảo Trâm; 278 - Vũ Quỳnh Trang
Neva Fashion Awards	433 - Nguyễn Thị Thu Phương

== Fast Track Events ==
=== Beauty With A Purpose ===
The winner of Beauty With A Purpose would automatically advance to Top 5

Final result	Contestant
Winner	093 - Huỳnh Nguyễn Mai Phương
Top 5	026 – Nguyễn Thị Phượng; 218 – Võ Ngọc Hồng Đào; 228 – Đặng Vân Ly; 278 – Vũ Quỳnh Trang

=== Beach Beauty ===
The winner of Beach Beauty would automatically advance to Top 10

Final result	Contestant
Winner	068 – Nguyễn Lê Ngọc Thảo
Top 5	146 – Phạm Thị Phương Quỳnh; 151 – Lê Thị Tường Vy; 245 – Đỗ Thị Hà; 433 – Nguyễn Thị Thu Phương

=== Multimedia ===
The winner of Multimedia would automatically advance to Top 22

Final result	Contestant
Winner	245 – Đỗ Thị Hà
Top 5	088 – Hoàng Bảo Trâm; 171 – Nguyễn Thị Cẩm Đan; 232 – Nguyễn Thị Minh Trang; 322 – Phạm Thị Ngọc Ánh

=== Popular Vote ===
The winner of Popular Vote would automatically advance to Top 22

Final result	Contestant
Winner	138 – Đậu Hải Minh Anh
Top 5	069 – Phù Bảo Nghi; 151 – Lê Thị Tường Vy; 245 – Đỗ Thị Hà; 322 – Phạm Thị Ngọc Ánh

=== Top Model ===
Final result	Contestant
Winner	052 – Bùi Thị Thanh Nhàn
Top 5	068 – Nguyễn Lê Ngọc Thảo; 182 – Nguyễn Thị Bích Thuỳ; 245 – Đỗ Thị Hà; 345 – Nguyễn Thị Hoài Thương

=== Sports ===
Final result	Contestant
Winner	069 – Phù Bảo Nghi
Top 5	012 – Kim Trà My; 116 – Nguyễn Lê Phương Thảo; 322 – Phạm Thị Ngọc Ánh; 419 – Hoàng Tú Quỳnh

=== Tourism ===
Final result	Contestant
Winner	077 – Lê Trúc Linh
Top 5	093 – Huỳnh Nguyễn Mai Phương; 228 – Đặng Vân Ly; 237 – Nguyễn Khánh Ly; 278 – Vũ Quỳnh Trang

=== Talent ===
Final result	Contestant
Winner	319 – Doãn Hải My
Top 5	088 – Hoàng Bảo Trâm; 045 – Phạm Ngọc Phương Anh; 093 – Huỳnh Nguyễn Mai Phương; 169 – Lê Ngọc Trang

== Contestants ==
35 contestants in the final

No.	Contestants
012	Kim Trà My
018	Võ Ngọc Hồng Đào
025	Lê Nguyễn Bảo Ngọc
026	Nguyễn Thị Phượng
045	Phạm Ngọc Phương Anh
052	Bùi Thị Thanh Nhàn
068	Nguyễn Lê Ngọc Thảo
069	Phù Bảo Nghi
077	Lê Trúc Linh
088	Hoàng Bảo Trâm
093	Huỳnh Nguyễn Mai Phương
116	Nguyễn Lê Phương Thảo
135	Nguyễn Thị Trân Châu
138	Đậu Hải Minh Anh
146	Phạm Thị Phương Quỳnh
151	Lê Thị Tường Vy
169	Lê Ngọc Trang
171	Nguyễn Thị Cẩm Đan
175	Trần Hoàng Ái Nhi
182	Nguyễn Thị Bích Thùy
228	Đặng Vân Ly
232	Nguyễn Thị Minh Trang
237	Nguyễn Khánh Ly
245	Đỗ Thị Hà
278	Vũ Quỳnh Trang
305	Ngô Thị Thu Hương
319	Doãn Hải My
322	Phạm Thị Ngọc Ánh
335	Nguyễn Hà My
345	Nguyễn Thị Hoài Thương
408	Nguyễn Huỳnh Diệu Linh
419	Hoàng Tú Quỳnh
443	Nguyễn Thị Thu Phương
445	Nguyễn Thị Thanh Thủy
462	Nguyễn Thảo Vi

== Judges ==
The Miss Vietnam 2020 final judges were:

- Dương Trung Quốc – Historian
- Đỗ Mỹ Linh – Miss Vietnam 2016
- Hà Kiều Anh – Miss Vietnam 1992
- Nguyễn Thụy Vân – 2nd Runner-up of Miss Vietnam 2008
- Trần Hữu Việt – Journalist
- Hoàng Tử Hùng – Professor, doctor
- Lê Thanh Hoà – Fashion designer
