= Đặng Thu Thảo =

Miss Vietnam 2012 winner

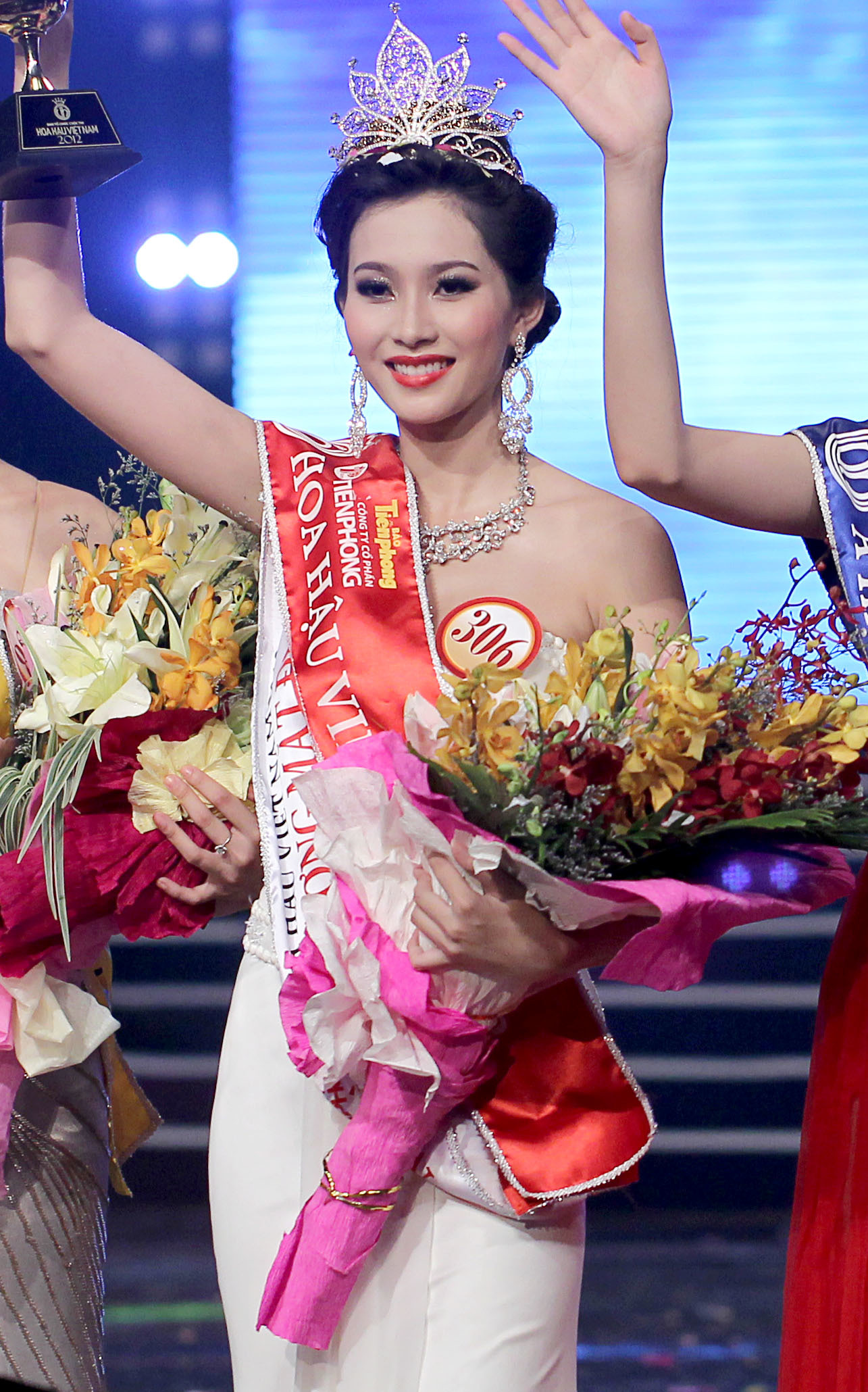
- Born: Đặng Thu Thảo; February 15, 1991 (age 35); Bạc Liêu, Vietnam
- Occupations: model beauty pageant titleholder
- Spouse: Nguyễn Trung Tín (m. 2017)
- Children: 2
- Beauty pageant titleholder
- Title: Miss Mekong Delta 2012; Miss Vietnam 2012
- Years active: 2012–present
- Hair color: Black
- Eye color: Black

Đặng Thu Thảo (born February 15, 1991) is a Vietnamese model and beauty pageant titleholder who was crowned Miss Vietnam 2012.

In 2012, Thảo was named Miss Mekong Delta. Later that year, she was crowned Miss Vietnam.

Thảo has been praised for her scandal-free life and for her activities in support of the community. She twice declined to represent Vietnam at the Miss World beauty pageant.

Awards and achievements
Preceded by Đặng Thị Ngọc Hân	Miss Vietnam; 2012	Succeeded by Nguyễn Cao Kỳ Duyên
Preceded by Võ Thị Lệ Thu	Miss Mekong Delta; 2012	Succeeded by Nguyễn Thị Lệ Nam Em
