= Miss Vietnam 2012 =

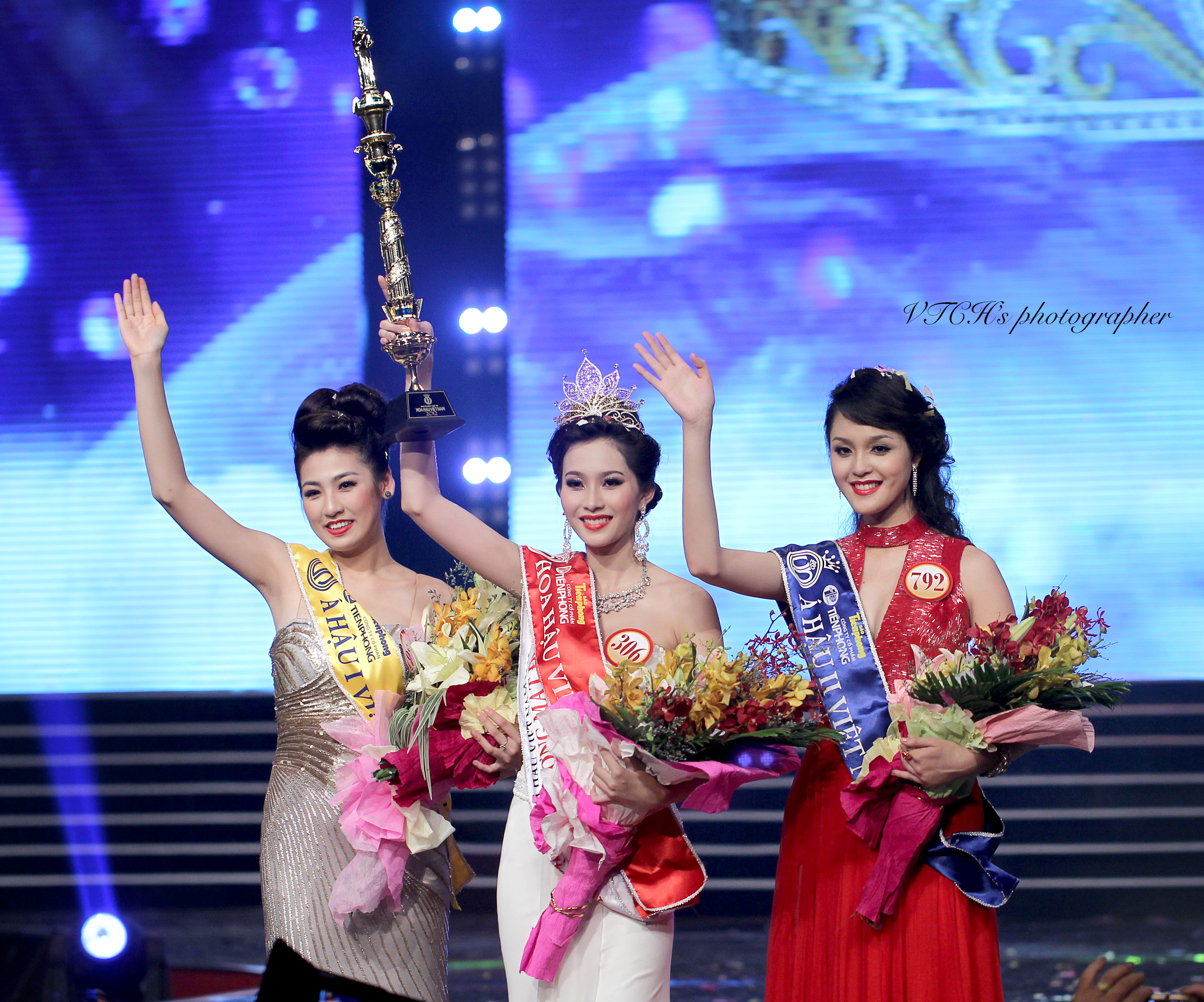
- Top 3 Miss Vietnam 2012
- Date: August 25, 2012
- Presenters: Jennifer Pham; Anh Tuấn
- Venue: Tiên Sơn Sports Complex, Da Nang, Vietnam
- Broadcaster: VTV1; VTV4
- Entrants: 40
- Placements: 10
- Winner: Đặng Thu Thảo; Bạc Liêu

Miss Vietnam 2012 (Vietnamese: Hoa hậu Việt Nam 2012) was the 13th edition of the Miss Vietnam pageant. It was held on August 25, 2012 at Tiên Sơn Sports Complex, Da Nang, Vietnam. Miss Vietnam 2010 Đặng Thị Ngọc Hân crowned her successor Đặng Thu Thảo at the end of the event.

== Results ==
=== Placements ===
Color keys

- Declared as the winner in an International pageant.
- Ended as Runner-up in an International pageant.
- Ended as finalist or semifinalist in an International pageant.
- Unplaced.

Final result	Contestant
Miss Vietnam 2012	306 – Đặng Thu Thảo
1st Runner-Up	828 – Dương Tú Anh
2nd Runner-Up	792 – Đỗ Hoàng Anh
Top 5	205 – Phan Thị Mơ; 396 – Vũ Ngọc Anh
Top 10	610 – Nguyễn Thị Xuân Trang; 211 – Ninh Hoàng Ngân; 890 – Nguyễn Thị Hà; 960 – Trương Thị Hải Vân; 138 – Nguyễn Thị Mỹ Hạnh

=== Special awards ===
Special Award	Contestant
Best Face	306 – Đặng Thu Thảo
Best Skin	890 – Nguyễn Thị Hà
Miss Beach	211 – Ninh Hoàng Ngân
Miss Talent	610 – Nguyễn Thị Xuân Trang
Best Hair	205 – Phan Thị Mơ
Miss Áo dài	396 – Vũ Ngọc Anh

== Contestants ==
40 contestants in the final.

Contestants	No.
Vũ Ngọc Anh	396
Đỗ Hoàng Anh	792
Dương Tú Anh	828
Bùi Thị Hà Anh	819
Nguyễn Ngọc Vân Anh	001
Nguyễn Lê Thục Châu	022
Lê Phúc Hồng Châu	035
Dương Thị Dung	009
Diệp Hồng Đào	055
Nguyễn Thị Hà	890
Nguyễn Thị Mỹ Hạnh	138
Trần Thị Bích Hằng	115
Đặng Thị Lệ Hằng	126
Nguyễn Thị Thu Hương	281
Thiều Thị Linh	907
Nguyễn Thùy Linh	937
Hoàng Diệu Linh	980
Phan Thị Mơ	205
Ninh Hoàng Ngân	211
Ngô Bích Ngọc	706
Nguyễn Thị Tuyết Ngọc	219
Trương Thị Quỳnh Như	230
Lê Thị Kim Oanh	649
Phan Hà Phương	810
Trần Thị Hoài Phương	342
Vương Thu Phương	727
Nguyễn Thanh Thảo	189
Phạm Thị Phương Thảo	262
Đặng Thu Thảo	306
Nguyễn Thu Thảo	315
Nguyễn Thị Minh Thu	559
Nguyễn Thị Thanh Thùy	338
Nguyễn Thị Huyền Trang	954
Nguyễn Thị Thùy Trang	526
Nguyễn Thị Xuân Trang	610
Dương Tuyết Trinh	530
Nguyễn Thị Truyền	569
Trương Thị Hải Vân	960
Trần Bảo Vy	808
Võ Hoàng Yến	235
