= Ho Chi Minh City International University =

University in Vietnam

Coordinates: 10.8777°N 106.8020°E

VNU-HCM International University
- Trường Đại học Quốc tế, Đại học Quốc gia Thành phố Hồ Chí Minh
- Type: Public
- Established: December 5, 2003; 22 years ago
- Parent institution: Vietnam National University, Ho Chi Minh City
- Rector: A/Prof. Dr. Le Van Thang
- Academic staff: 720
- Students: 9,478
- Undergraduates: 8,809
- Postgraduates: 669
- Location: Ho Chi Minh City, Vietnam
- Campus: Suburban, 11.52 hectares
- Website: www.hcmiu.edu.vn

Ho Chi Minh City International University (HCMIU; Vietnamese: Trường Đại học Quốc tế, Đại học Quốc gia Thành phố Hồ Chí Minh), or VNU-HCM International University, is the first and the only public research university in Vietnam that offers programs taught entirely in English. Established in 2003, it is now becoming as one of the leading research powerhouses in Vietnam. The university is affiliated to the Vietnam National University, Ho Chi Minh City (VNU-HCM).

The university runs all its administrative, academic, and research activities in Thu Duc college town, a 77-hectare joint land endowment between Ho Chi Minh City and Binh Duong Province. It is home to Regional Centre of Expertise on Education for Sustainable Development, a non-profit organization that works closely with the United Nations and other 136 RCEs to incorporate sustainable development into education.

The teaching is conducted in English. In addition to entrance exams, students also have to write an English language test or obtain TOEFL, TOEIC, IELTS or equivalent English certificate as required by HCMIU and its cooperative universities.

In addition to offer undergraduate and postgraduate programs in business studies and engineering, HCMIU also offers a number of other courses related to the two fields. The IU School of Business which offers the Bachelor of Business in Business Administration has received full accreditation by the Accreditation Council for Business Schools and Programs (ACBSP, the USA) in 2023.

== Admission ==
Although most of the classes are taught in English, some courses are required to be taught in Vietnamese as well, such as Marxism philosophy, and Ho Chi Minh Thoughts.

The training programs at IU includes business administration, finance & banking, logistics, biotechnology, biochemistry, food technology, electrical engineering, automation & control, information technology (computer science engineering), biomedical engineering, civil engineering, industrial systems engineering, space engineering, environmental engineering, financial engineering & risk management (applied mathematics) and English language.

== Cooperative and Twinning Programs ==
A number of the universities in the United States of America, the United Kingdom, Australia, Canada and New Zealand have formed educational partnerships with the university. The students can study at the university for two or three years, followed by two or three years of study abroad. The tuition fee is higher than in other Vietnamese universities. Diplomas will be issued by HCMIU's cooperative universities.

United States:

- Andrews University
- Binghamton University
- University of Houston

United Kingdom:

- The University of Nottingham
- University of the West of England

Australia:

- The University of New South Wales
- Deakin University
- University of Sydney
- Macquarie University

New Zealand:

- Auckland University of Technology

Canada:

- Lakehead University

== Postgraduate Programs ==
1. Doctor of Biotechnology (Phd in Biotechnology)
2. Doctor of Business administration (Phd in Business administration)
3. Master of Business Administration (MBA in Finance, Technology Management, Marketing)
4. Master of Science in biotechnology (MSc in biotechnology)
5. Master of Science in Electrical Engineering (MSc in Electrical Engineering)
6. Master of Science in Industrial Systems Engineering (MSc in Industrial Systems Engineering)
7. Master of Science in Information Technology Management (MSc in Electrical Engineering)
8. Master of Science in Biomedical Engineering (MSc in Biomedical Engineering)
9. Master of Science in Applied Mathematics (MSc in Applied Mathematics)
10. Master of Science in leadership, joint program with Northeastern University, United States (MSc in leadership)

== Schools and Departments ==
Currently, International University has 10 schools and 2 departments as listed below:

=== School of Business ===
Programs offered:

- Marketing, with 2 specializations:
  - Digital Marketing
  - Marketing Operation Management
- Business Administration, with 4 specializations:
  - Business Management
  - Marketing
  - Hospitality - Tourism Management
  - International Business

=== School of Economics, Finance and Accounting ===
Programs offered:

- Economics
- Finance
- Accounting

=== School of Biotechnology ===
Programs offered:

- Biotechnology, with 4 tracks:
  - BioMedical
  - Molecular
  - Industrial
  - Marine and Environmental Science
- Food Technology, with 2 tracks:
  - Production Management
  - Technology-Engineering
- Aquatic Resource Management, with 2 tracks:
  - Management
  - Technology
- Chemical Biology

=== School of Electrical Engineering ===
Programs offered:

- Electrical Engineering, with the following specializations:
  - Electronics and Embedded Systems
  - Telecommunication Networks
  - Signal Processing
  - RF Design
- Automation and Control Engineering

=== School of Computer Science and Engineering ===
Programs offered:

- Information Technology, with 3 specializations:
  - Network Engineering
  - Computer Engineering
  - Computer Science

=== School of Biomedical Engineering ===
Programs offered:

- Biomedical Engineering, with 4 tracks:
  - Medical Instrumentation
  - Biomedical Signal and Image Processing
  - Pharmaceutical Engineering
  - Regenerative Medicine

=== School of Industrial Engineering and Management ===
Programs offered:

- Industrial Systems Engineering
- Logistics and Supply Chain Management

=== School of Civil Engineering and Management ===
The department offers the program of Civil Engineering.

=== School of Languages ===
The School of Languages provides globally standardized language programs to assist students in their studies, which are conducted wholly in English.

Program offered: English Linguistics and Literature

=== School of Chemical and Environmental Engineering ===
Programs offered:

- Chemical Engineering
- Environmental Engineering

=== Department of Physics ===
The department offer undergraduate program in Space Engineering which specializes in Image Analysis and Remote Sensing. It is responsible for all Physics courses. Its scientific research includes the fields of Galactic Astronomy and Plasma Physics.

=== Department of Mathematics ===
The department offers the program of Applied Mathematics with the specialization of Financial Engineering and Risk Management. It is also responsible for other mathematical-related courses.

== Accreditation ==
The International University has completed the assessment and accreditation at different levels:

- Institutional accreditation:
  - The Ministry of Education and Training (MOET) - 2016
  - ASEAN University Network - Quality Assurance (AUN-QA) - 2018
  - The Accreditation Agency for Study Programmes in Engineering, Informatics, Natural Sciences and Mathematic (ASIIN) - 2024
- Program accreditation:

No.	Programs	Year of Accreditation
ASIIN (Accreditation Agency for Study Programs in Engineering, Informatics, Natural Sciences and Mathematics)
1	Biotechnology	2023
2	Automation and Control Engineering	2023
3	Computer Science	2023
4	Information Technology	2023
5	Industrial and Systems Engineering	2023
6	Civil Engineering	2023
7	Data Science	2023
8	Environmental Engineering	2023
9	Space Engineering	2023
10	Biochemistry	2024
11	Biomedical Engineering	2024
12	Chemical Engineering	2024
AUN-QA (ASEAN University Network – Quality Assurance)
1	Master of Science in Biotechnology	2016
2	Master of Engineering in Industrial and Systems Engineering	2017
3	Master of Business Administration	2019
4	Science in Computer Science and Engineering	2009
5	Science in Computer Science and Engineering	2017
6	Science in Biotechnology	2011
7	Science in Biotechnology	2017
8	Business Administration	2012
9	Business Administration	2017
10	Engineering in Electronics and Telecommunications	2013
11	Engineering in Industrial and Systems Engineering	2015
12	Engineering Biomedical Engineering	2015
13	Engineering in Food Technology	2017
14	Engineering in Civil Engineering	2018
15	Arts in Finance and Banking	2018
16	Engineering in Logistics and Supply Chain Management	2021
17	Applied Mathematics (Financial Engineering and Risk Management)	2023
ACBSP (Accreditation Council for Business Schools and Programs)
1	Business Administration	2023
MOET (Ministry of Education & Training)
1	Public Management	2020
2	Engineering in Food Technology	2022
FIBAA (Foundation for International Business Administration Accreditation)
1	English Linguistics and Literature	2024
2	Finance and Banking	2024
ABET (Accreditation Board for Engineering and Technology )
1	Electrical Engineering	2018
2	Electrical Engineering	2024 (no result yet)
3	Biomedical Engineering	2018
4	Biomedical Engineering	2024 (no result yet)

== Student life ==
=== Student organizations ===
Students at the International University run over 15 clubs and organizations, including volunteer groups, academic clubs and common-interest teams. Most organizations are funded and governed by the International University Youth Union and the Union of Students, while a few others are directly run and supported by Schools and Departments.

Youth Union:

- Event Department
- External Relations Department
- Information Department
- Science and Technology Department

Union of Students:

- Social Work Team (SWT)
- IU Arts Team (Arteam)
- IU Guitar Club (GC)
- Enactus IU (formerly SIFE IU)
- Soft Skills Club (SSC)
- ISE Art club (IAC)
- Guitar Club (GC)
- English Club (IEC)
- French Club (FC)
- Sports Club (SC)
- Japan Club
- Korean Club (KYG)

Other organizations:

- Securities Exchange Club (SEC)
- Marketing Club (Martic)
- IT Club (ITC)
- English Speaking Club (ESC)
- IU Buddy (Exchange student support group)

=== Student accommodation ===
Students can register for housing services at the following dormitories:

- VNU-HCMC Dormitory
- VNU-HCMC Guest House
- Dormitories in city center: Phan Liem and Ly Van Phuc streets.

== Campuses ==
- IU Main Campus, Thu Duc
- Ground floor, VNU-HCMC Central Library
- Institute for Environment and Resources, Dong Hoa, Binh Duong

== Board of Rectors ==
Rector: A/Prof. Dr. Lê Văn Thăng, PhD.

Vice Rectors:

- A/Prof. Đinh Đức Anh Vũ, PhD.
