= Tiểu Vy =

Vietnamese model and beauty queen

Trần Tiểu Vy
- Born: August 23, 2000 (age 26); Hội An, Quảng Nam, Vietnam
- Education: Ho Chi Minh City University of Technology and Education
- Beauty pageant titleholder
- Title: Miss Vietnam 2018
- Hair color: Black
- Eye color: Black
- Major competitions: Miss Vietnam 2018 (Winner); Miss World 2018 (Top 30)

Trần Tiểu Vy (born August 23, 2000) is a Vietnamese model and beauty pageant titleholder who was crowned Miss Vietnam 2018. She represented Vietnam at the Miss World 2018 pageant.

== Early life ==
Vy was born and raised in Hội An, Quảng Nam, Vietnam. She completed 10th-grade at Trần Quý Cáp High School in Hội An then later moved to Ho Chi Minh City and continued to study at Vạn Hạnh Escalator School in District 10, Ho Chi Minh City. After finishing high school, Vy pursued a degree in Business Administration through the International Linkage Program between the University of Sunderland in Sunderland, United Kingdom and Ho Chi Minh City University of Technology and Education, graduating in 2022.

== Career ==
In 2018, at the age of 18, Vy was crowned Miss Vietnam. In the final night of the competition, she surpassed 40 contestants from across the country, including 1st Runner-up Bùi Phương Nga and 2nd Runner-up Nguyễn Thị Thúy An. That same year, Vy represented Vietnam at the Miss World pageant held in Sanya, China, and placed in the Top 30 overall. She achieved several sub-awards, including Top 3 in the Beauty with a Purpose project, Top 30 in the Talent competition, and Top 32 in the Top Model segment.

In addition to her participation in beauty pageants, in 2018 Vy was invited to attend the launch event of the VinFast automobile brand at the Paris Motor Show, France, an event that attracted some international celebrities, including former association football player David Beckham.

In 2020, Vy ventured into acting by appearing in the music video "Em Không Sai, Chúng ta sai" by Vietnamese singer Erik. In 2022, she served as a judge for the first time at the Miss World Vietnam pageant. This marked a new milestone in Vy's career since winning the crown. That same year, Vy had her first film role, playing the lead in the movie Đảo độc đắc Tử mẫu Thiên linh cái, directed by Lê Bình Giang. She also appeared in the Tet film Chủ tịch giao hàng, produced by artist Trường Giang.

In 2026, she competed in the HTV7's reality show Xin chào thứ bảy, the Vietnamese version of Hello Saturday.

== Pageantry ==
=== Miss Vietnam 2018 ===
Vy was crowned Miss Vietnam 2018 on September 16, 2018, at the Phu Tho Indoor Stadium in Ho Chi Minh City. She succeeded Miss Vietnam 2016, Đỗ Mỹ Linh.

=== Miss World 2018 ===
Vy represented Vietnam at the Miss World 2018 pageant in Sanya, China on December 8, 2018. She was placed in top 30.

== Filmography ==
=== Film ===
Year	Title	Notes	Ref.
2022	Jackpot Island: Kumanthong Returns	Kim	
2024	Mai	Dương's wife	
2025	The 4 Rascals	Quỳnh Anh	

=== Music video appearances ===
Year	Song title	Artist	Ref.
2020	Em Không Sai, Chúng Ta Sai	Erik	
2023	Kim	MLee	

== Awards and nominations ==
Award ceremony	Year	Category	Result	Ref.
Elle Vietnam Beauty Awards	2020	Best Face	Won	
Elle Vietnam Beauty Awards	2022	Best Face	Won	

Awards and achievements
Preceded by Đỗ Mỹ Linh	Miss World Vietnam; 2018	Succeeded by Lương Thùy Linh
Preceded by Đỗ Mỹ Linh	Miss Vietnam; 2018	Succeeded by Đỗ Thị Hà
