= Miss World Vietnam 2019 =

1st Miss World Vietnam pageant

- Date: August 3, 2019
- Entertainment: Đàm Vĩnh Hưng; Lệ Quyên; Đông Nhi; Hoàng Thùy Linh; Chi Pu
- Venue: Cocobay, Danang, Vietnam
- Broadcaster: VTV1; VTV8; THVL
- Entrants: 40
- Placements: 25
- Winner: Lương Thùy Linh; Cao Bằng
- Best National Costume: Nguyễn Thị Bích Thùy; Đắk Lắk

Miss World Vietnam 2019 was the first edition of the Miss World Vietnam pageant. It was held on August 3, 2019, at Cocobay, Danang, Vietnam.

The pageant was to crown the Vietnam representatives to compete in the beauty pageants of Miss World 2019, Miss International 2019, Miss Grand International and Miss Intercontinental.

== Results ==
=== Placements ===
Color keys

- Declared as the winner in an International pageant.
- Ended as Runner-up in an International pageant.
- Ended as finalist or semifinalist in an International pageant.
- Unplaced.

Final result	Contestant	International pageant	International placement
Miss World Vietnam 2019	481 – Lương Thùy Linh	Miss World 2019	Top 12
1st Runner-Up	053 – Nguyễn Hà Kiều Loan	Miss Grand International 2019	Top 10
2nd Runner-Up	055 – Nguyễn Tường San	Miss International 2019	Top 8
Top 5	048 – Nguyễn Thị Thu Phương; 080 – Dương Thị Ngọc Thoa		
Top 10	077 – Trần Hoàng Ái Nhi; 152 – Lê Thanh Tú; 182 – Trần Đình Thạch Thảo; 356 – Nguyễn Thị Quỳnh Nga; 477 – Nguyễn Thị Bích Thùy		
Top 15	069 – Lâm Thị Bích Tuyền; 071 – Phạm Thị Anh Thư; 095 – Nguyễn Thị Thanh Khoa; 148 – Tạ Huyền My; 313 – Phan Cẩm Nhi		
Top 25	025 – Đinh Quỳnh Trang; 099 – Trần Thị Hoa Phượng; 111 – Hoàng Thị Bích Ngọc; 133 – Lê Thị Thu; 177 – Phan Anh Thư; 246 – Lâm Quế Phi; 299 – Hoàng Hải Thu §; 466 – Trần Thị Mai; 500 – Nguyễn Thị Thu Hiền; 525 – Nguyễn Phương Hoa		

§ Voted intop Top 25 by viewers.

=== Special awards ===
Special Award	Contestant
People's Choice	299 – Hoàng Hải Thu
Miss Áo dài	477 – Nguyễn Thị Bích Thùy
Best Skin	182 – Trần Đình Thạch Thảo

== Contestants ==
=== Top 40 contestants in the final round ===
No.	Contestants	Age	Height (cm)	Hometown
007	Huỳnh Ái Xuân	19	171	Kiên Giang
009	Nguyễn Thị Lan Anh	23	168	Quảng Ninh
025	Đinh Quỳnh Trang	19	172	Hanoi
028	Lê Trinh Trinh	21	168	Đồng Tháp
048	Nguyễn Thị Thu Phương	19	175	Bắc Ninh
053	Nguyễn Hà Kiều Loan	19	170	Quảng Nam
055	Nguyễn Tường San	19	170	Hanoi
069	Lâm Thị Bích Tuyền	20	167	An Giang
071	Phạm Thị Anh Thư	22	175	Hanoi
077	Trần Hoàng Ái Nhi	21	170	Đắk Lắk
080	Dương Thị Ngọc Thoa	21	172	Sóc Trăng
089	Trần Mỹ Ngọc	19	172	Đồng Tháp
095	Nguyễn Thị Thanh Khoa	25	176	Ho Chi Minh City
099	Trần Thị Hoa Phượng	21	173	Danang
100	Nguyễn Thị Ngọc Điệp	22	170	Đồng Nai
111	Hoàng Thị Bích Ngọc	20	174	Phú Thọ
123	Trần Hoàng Phương Trang	22	169	Đồng Nai
133	Lê Thị Thu	23	168	Kiên Giang
148	Tạ Huyền My	22	175	Hanoi
152	Lê Thanh Tú	23	170	Hanoi
157	Phạm Ngọc Bảo Ngân	20	167	Ho Chi Minh City
171	Nông Thúy Hằng	20	168	Hà Giang
177	Phan Anh Thư	19	173	Huế
182	Trần Đình Thạch Thảo	22	175	Bình Thuận
190	Nguyễn Trương Diệu Ý	19	166	Đắk Nông
192	Trần Thị Thu Uyên	19	174	Sóc Trăng
246	Lâm Quế Phi	20	171	Đồng Nai
249	Kim Trà My	19	168	Hanoi
299	Hoàng Hải Thu	24	169	Hanoi
313	Phan Cẩm Nhi	19	170	Danang
345	Trịnh Lê Uyên	19	170	Hanoi
356	Nguyễn Thị Quỳnh Nga	24	167	Hanoi
411	Lê Thị Mỹ Anh	20	172	Huế
446	Tô Mai Thùy Dương	23	167	Quảng Ngãi
466	Trần Thị Mai	21	172	Quảng Ninh
477	Nguyễn Thị Bích Thùy	18	173	Đắk Lắk
481	Lương Thùy Linh	19	177	Cao Bằng
500	Nguyễn Thị Thu Hiền	24	169	Ho Chi Minh City
525	Nguyễn Phương Hoa	24	167	Ho Chi Minh City
534	Huỳnh Thị Thanh Dâng	19	168	Bình Thuận
