= Lương Thùy Linh =

Vietnamese beauty pageant titleholder (born 2000)

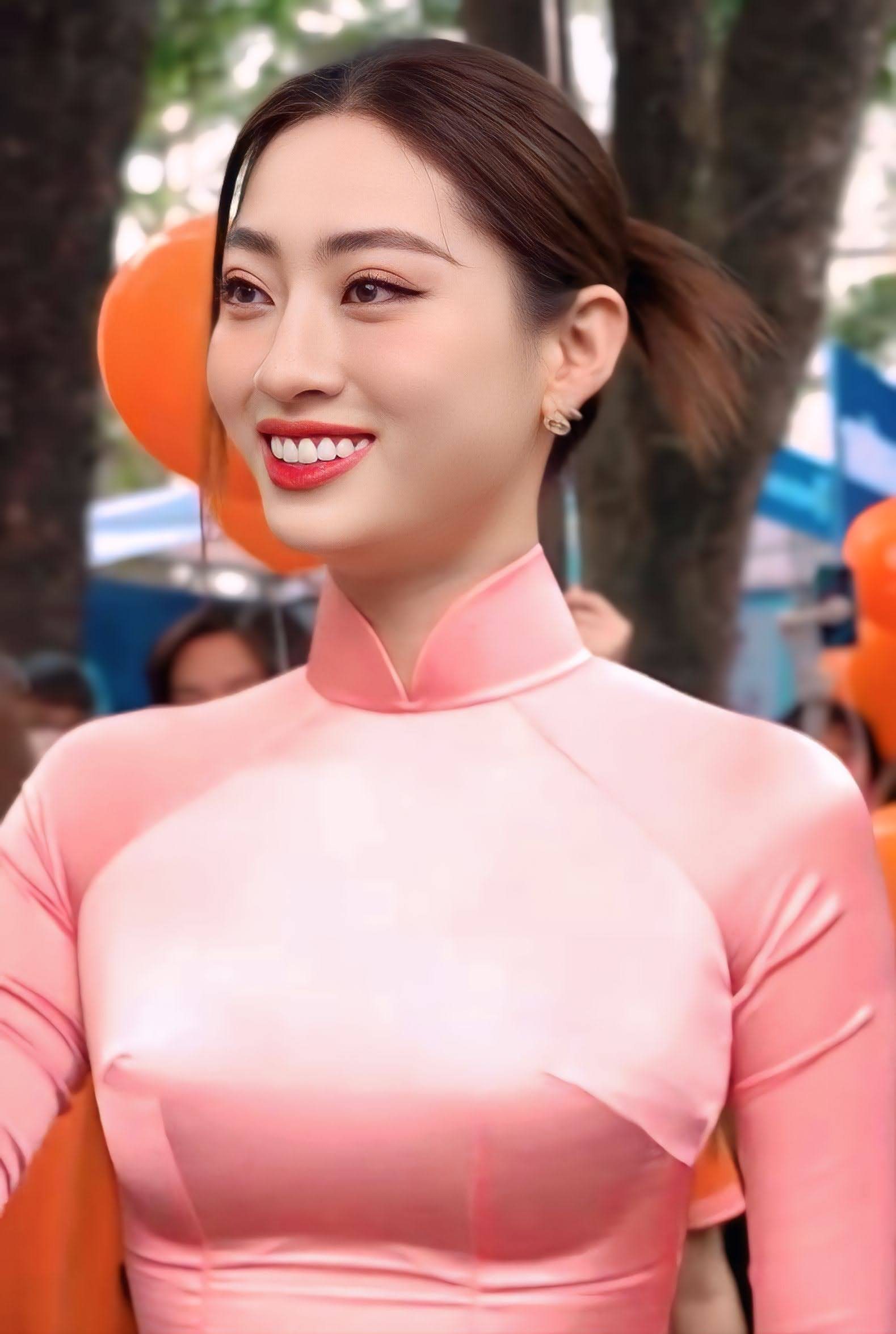
- Linh in March 2023
- Born: Lương Thùy Linh; 15 August 2000 (age 26); Cao Bang, Vietnam
- Height: 1.78 m (5 ft 10 in)
- Beauty pageant titleholder
- Title: Miss World Vietnam 2019
- Major competitions: Miss World Vietnam 2019 (Winner); Miss World 2019 (Top 12)

Lương Thùy Linh (born 15 August 2000) is a Vietnamese beauty pageant titleholder who won Miss World Vietnam 2019. She represented Vietnam at Miss World 2019 and reached the top 12.

== Pageantry ==
=== Miss World Vietnam 2019 ===
Linh won Miss World Vietnam 2019 on 3 August 2019 at the Cocobay in Danang.

=== Miss World 2019 ===
Linh represented Vietnam at Miss World 2019 in London, UK on 14 December 2019, and reached the top 12.

Awards and achievements
Preceded by Trần Tiểu Vy	Miss World Vietnam; 2019	Succeeded by Đỗ Thị Hà
Preceded by None	Hoa hậu Thế giới Việt Nam; 2019	Succeeded by Huỳnh Nguyễn Mai Phương
Preceded by Peirui Mao	1st- Runner up Miss World - Top Model; 2019	Succeeded by Audrey Monkam
