= List of Vietnam representatives at international beauty pageants =

Gallery Vietnamese winners of international beauty pageant

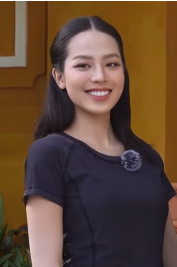
Huỳnh Thị Thanh Thủy
Winner of Miss International 2024

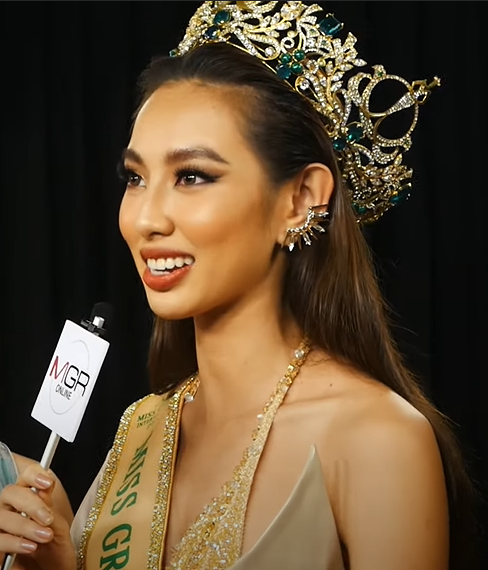
Nguyễn Thúc Thùy Tiên
Winner of Miss Grand International 2021

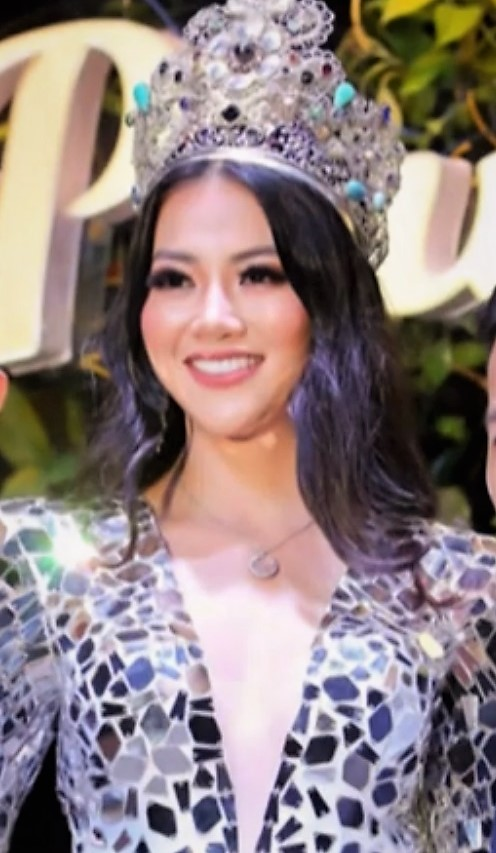
Nguyễn Phương Khánh
Winner of Miss Earth 2018

This is a list of the Vietnam representatives and their placements at the international beauty pageants. Vietnam has won in all pageants with a total of 52 placements and 4 victories:

- One – Miss International crown (2024)
- One – Miss Earth crown (2018)
- One – Miss Grand International crown (2021)
- One – Miss Intercontinental crown (2022)

== Big Four beauty pageants ==
The Big Four beauty pageants are the four major international beauty pageants for women — Miss World, Miss Universe, Miss International and Miss Earth.

=== Miss World ===
Color keys

- : Declared as Winner
- : Finished as a runner-up or top 5
- : Finished as one of the finalists (top 10)
- : Finished as one of the semi-finalists (top 20)

Year	Miss World Vietnam	Province	Result	Prize	Ref.
2027	Phan Phương Oanh	Hanoi	TBA		
2026	Lê Nguyễn Bảo Ngọc	Can Tho	Top 6	4 Special Awards: Top 04 – Miss World Top Model; Top 20 – Head-to-Head Challenge; Top 23 – Miss World Talent; Top 24 – Beauty with a Purpose	
2025	Huỳnh Trần Ý Nhi	Bình Định	Top 40	3 Special Awards: Top 08 – Beauty with a Purpose; Top 20 – Multimedia Challenge; Top 48 – Miss World Talent	
2023	Huỳnh Nguyễn Mai Phương	Đồng Nai	Top 40	2 Special Awards: Top 25 – Head to Head Challenge; Winner – Multimedia Challenge	
2021	Đỗ Thị Hà	Thanh Hóa	Top 13	5 Special Awards: Round 2 – Head to Head Challenge; Top 28 – Beauty with a Purpose; Top 27 – Miss World Talent; Top 13 – Miss World Top Model; Winner – Digital Challenge	
2019	Lương Thùy Linh	Cao Bằng	Top 12	2 Special Awards: 1st Runner-Up – Miss World Top Model; Top 10 – Beauty with a Purpose	
2018	Trần Tiểu Vy	Quảng Nam	Top 30	3 Special Awards: 2nd Runner-Up – Beauty with a Purpose; Top 30 – Miss World Talent; Top 32 – Miss World Top Model	
2017	Đỗ Mỹ Linh	Hanoi	Top 40	4 Special Awards: Winner – Beauty with a Purpose; Top 09 – Multimedia Challenge; Top 10 – People's Choice Award; Winner – Head to Head Challenge	
2016	Trương Thị Diệu Ngọc	Danang	Unplaced	1 Special Award: Top 37 – Beauty with a Purpose	
2015	Trần Ngọc Lan Khuê	Ho Chi Minh City	Top 11	3 Special Awards: Winner – People's Choice Award; Winner – Fashion Designer Award; Top 30 – Miss World Top Model	
2014	Nguyễn Thị Loan	Thái Bình	Top 25	3 Special Awards: Top 17 – Miss World Talent; Top 27 – Beauty with a Purpose; Top 32 – Miss World Sport	
2013	Lại Hương Thảo	Quảng Ninh	Unplaced		
2012	Vũ Thị Hoàng My	Đồng Nai	Unplaced	2 Special Awards: Top 30 – Best in Interview; Top 40 – Beach Beauty	
2011	Victoria Phạm Thuý Vy	California	Unplaced		
2010	Nguyễn Ngọc Kiều Khanh	Munich	Unplaced		
2009	Trần Thị Hương Giang	Hải Dương	Top 16	2 Special Awards: 1st Runner-Up – Miss World Top Model; Top 12 – Beach Beauty	
2008	Dương Trương Thiên Lý	Đồng Tháp	Unplaced	2 Special Awards: Winner – People's Choice Award; Winner – Miss Golf Sport	
2007	Đặng Minh Thu	Nam Định	Unplaced		
2006	Mai Phương Thúy	Hanoi	Top 17	1 Special Award: Top 20 – Designer Dress Award	
2005	Vũ Hương Giang	Hanoi	Unplaced		
2004	Nguyễn Thị Huyền	Haiphong	Top 15		
2003	Nguyễn Đình Thụy Quân	Ho Chi Minh City	Unplaced		
2002	Phạm Thị Mai Phương	Haiphong	Top 20		

=== Miss Universe ===
Color keys

- : Declared as Winner
- : Ended as runner-up or top 5/6 qualification
- : Ended as one of the finalists or semifinalists

Year	Miss Universe Vietnam	Province	Result	Prize	Ref.
2026	Nguyễn Quỳnh Anh	Hanoi	TBA		
2025	Nguyễn Hương Giang	Hanoi	Unplaced		
2024	Nguyễn Cao Kỳ Duyên	Nam Định	Top 30	1 Special Award: 3rd Place – Best National Costume	
2023	Bùi Quỳnh Hoa	Hanoi	Unplaced		
2022	Nguyễn Thị Ngọc Châu	Tây Ninh	Unplaced	1 Special Award: Swimsuit Cape Vote	
2021	Nguyễn Huỳnh Kim Duyên	Cần Thơ	Top 16	1 Special Award: People's Choice Award	
2020	Nguyễn Trần Khánh Vân	Hồ Chí Minh City	Top 21	1 Special Award: People's Choice Award	
2019	Hoàng Thị Thùy	Thanh Hóa	Top 20		
2018	H'Hen Niê	Đắk Lắk	Top 5		
2017	Nguyễn Thị Loan	Thái Bình	Unplaced		
2016	Đặng Thị Lệ Hằng	Đà Nẵng	Unplaced	1 Special Award: Top 12 – Best National Costume	
2015	Phạm Thị Hương	Hải Phòng	Unplaced		
2013	Trương Thị May	Hồ Chí Minh City	Unplaced		
2012	Lưu Thị Diễm Hương	Hồ Chí Minh City	Unplaced		
2011	Vũ Thị Hoàng My	Đồng Nai	Unplaced		
2009	Võ Hoàng Yến	Hồ Chí Minh City	Unplaced		
2008	Nguyễn Thùy Lâm	Thái Bình	Top 15	2 Special Awards: Top 05 – Miss Aodai; Top 10 – Best National Costume	
2005	Phạm Thu Hằng	Hà Nội	Unplaced		
2004	Hoàng Khánh Ngọc	Hải Dương	Unplaced	1 Special Award: Best Catwalk	

=== Miss International ===
 Color keys
- : Declared as Winner
- : Ended as Runner-up or Top 5
- : Ended as one of the finalists (Top 8/10)
- : Ended as one of the semi-finalists (Top 15)

Year	Miss International Vietnam	Province	Result	Prize	Ref.
2026	Lê Phương Khánh Như	Khánh Hòa	TBA		
2025	Nguyễn Ngọc Kiều Duy	Vĩnh Long	Unplaced		
2024	Huỳnh Thị Thanh Thủy	Danang	Winner		
2023	Nguyễn Phương Nhi	Thanh Hóa	Top 15	1 Special Award: Miss People’s Choice Award	
2022	Phạm Ngọc Phương Anh	Ho Chi Minh City	Unplaced		
2019	Nguyễn Tường San	Hanoi	Top 8	1 Special Award: Best National Costume	
2018	Nguyễn Thúc Thùy Tiên	Ho Chi Minh City	Unplaced		
2017	Huỳnh Thị Thùy Dung	Ho Chi Minh City	Unplaced	1 Special Award: Miss Visit Japan Tourism Ambassador	
2016	Phạm Ngọc Phương Linh	Ho Chi Minh City	Unplaced	1 Special Award: Miss Visit Japan Tourism Ambassador	
2015	Phạm Hồng Thúy Vân	Ho Chi Minh City	3rd Runner-Up		
2014	Đặng Thu Thảo	Can Tho	Unplaced		
2013	Lô Thị Hương Trâm	Nghệ An	Unplaced		
2011	Trương Tri Trúc Diễm	Ho Chi Minh City	Top 15		
2010	Chung Thục Quyên	Ho Chi Minh City	Unplaced		
2009	Trần Thị Quỳnh	Haiphong	Unplaced		
2008	Cao Thùy Dương	Hanoi	Unplaced		
2007	Phạm Thị Thùy Dương	Hanoi	Unplaced	1 Special Award: Miss Internet	
2006	Vũ Ngọc Diệp	Hanoi	Unplaced		
2003	Lê Minh Phượng	Haiphong	Unplaced		
1996	Phạm Anh Phương	Hanoi	Unplaced		
1995	Trương Quỳnh Mai	Hanoi	Top 15	1 Special Award: Best National Costume	

=== Miss Earth ===
 Color keys
- : Declared as winner
- : Ended as runner-up or top 8
- : Ended as one of the finalists (top 12)
- : Ended as one of the semi-finalists (top 20)

Year	Miss Earth Vietnam	Province	Result	Prize	Ref.
2026	Phạm Hoàng Thu Uyên	Hải Phòng	TBA		
2025	Trịnh Mỹ Anh	Hà Nội	2nd Runner-Up		
2024	Cao Thị Ngọc Bích	Hưng Yên	Unplaced		
2023	Đỗ Thị Lan Anh	Hà Nội	2nd Runner-Up	3 Special Awards: Winner – Best Appearance; Winner – Best National Costume; Top 8 – Best Bikini	
2022	Thạch Thu Thảo	Trà Vinh	Top 20		
2021	Nguyễn Thị Vân Anh	Hưng Yên	Unplaced		
2020	Thái Thị Hoa	Gia Lai	Unplaced	3 Special Awards: (gold) Asia & Oceania – Best National Costume; (bronze) Asia & Oceania – Long Gown Competition; Top 15 – Jewel Beauty Strong Earth Ambassador	
2019	Hoàng Thị Hạnh	Nghệ An	Unplaced	3 Special Awards: (gold) – Best Resort Wear; (bronze) Asia & Oceania – Best National Costume; (bronze) – Miss Congeniality	
2018	Nguyễn Phương Khánh	Bến Tre	Winner	5 Special Awards: (gold) Asia & Oceania – Best National Costume; (gold) – Long Gown Competition; (silver) – Best Resort Wear; Miss Puerto Princesa Centro Hotel; Miss Robig Builders; Miss Ruj Beauty Care & Spa	
2017	Lê Thị Hà Thu	Thừa Thiên Huế	Top 16	6 Special Awards: (gold) – Miss Photogenic; (gold) – Best Earth Warrior; (gold) – Best Resort Wear; (bronze) – Miss Talent; (bronze) – Long Gown Competition; Top 15 – Beauty Figure and Form	
2016	Nguyễn Thị Lệ Nam Em	Tiền Giang	Top 8	4 Special Awards: (gold) – Miss Photogenic; (silver) – Miss Talent; (silver) – Long Gown Competition; Top 03 – Best Eco Video	
2012	Đỗ Hoàng Anh	Hà Nội	Unplaced		
2011	Phan Thị Mơ	Tiền Giang	Unplaced		
2010	Lưu Thị Diễm Hương	Hồ Chí Minh City	Top 14	4 Special Awards: Best in Swimsuit; Miss CanDeluxe (Sponsor); Miss Vietnam Airlines (Sponsor); Top 05 – Miss Talent	
2007	Trương Tri Trúc Diễm	Hồ Chí Minh City	Unplaced	1 Special Award: Miss Fashion	
2006	Vũ Nguyễn Hà Anh	Hà Nội	Unplaced	1 Special Award: 1st Runner-Up – Miss Talent	
2005	Đào Thanh Hoài	Hồ Chí Minh City	Unplaced		
2004	Bùi Thúy Hạnh	Hà Nội	Unplaced		
2003	Nguyễn Ngân Hà	Hồ Chí Minh City	Unplaced		

== International beauty pageants other than the Big Four ==
=== Miss Supranational ===
 Color keys
- : Declared as winner
- : Ended as runner-up
- : Ended as one of the finalists (top 10/12)
- : Ended as one of the semi-finalists (top 20/24)

Year	Miss Supranational Vietnam	Province	Result	Prize	Ref.
2026	Ngô Thị Quỳnh Mai	Hồ Chí Minh City	Top 12	2 Special Awards: Top 13 Miss Influencer Opportunity; Top 10 Supra Fan-Vote	
2025	Võ Cao Kỳ Duyên	Hải Phòng	Unplaced	2 Special Awards: Top 20 Miss Influencer Opportunity; Top 10 Supra Fan-Vote	
2024	Lydie Marie Wache Vũ	Hồ Chí Minh City	Unplaced	2 Special Awards: Top 13 – Miss Influencer Opportunity; Top 10 – Supra Fan Vote	
2023	Đặng Thanh Ngân	Sóc Trăng	4th Runner-Up	2 Special Awards: Winner – Supra Fan Vote; Top 10 – Supra Influencer	
2022	Nguyễn Huỳnh Kim Duyên	Cần Thơ	2nd Runner-up	3 Special Awards: Supra Model of Asia; Winner – Supra Chat; Top 12 – Supra Fan Vote	
2019	Nguyễn Thị Ngọc Châu	Tây Ninh	Top 10	3 Special Awards: Miss Supranational Asia; Winner – Supra Chat; 2nd Place – Miss Elegance	
2018	Nguyễn Minh Tú	Hồ Chí Minh City	Top 10	3 Special Awards: Miss Supranational Asia; Best in Evening Gown; Best National Costume	
2017	Nguyễn Đình Khánh Phương	Khánh Hòa	Top 25	1 Special Award: Miss Internet	
2016	Dương Nguyễn Khả Trang	Hà Giang	Top 25	1 Special Award: Best National Costume	
2015	Nguyễn Thị Lệ Quyên	Bạc Liêu	Unplaced	2 Special Awards: Best of Social Media; Top 03 – Best in Evening Gown	
2012	Lại Hương Thảo	Quảng Ninh	Unplaced	4 Special Awards: Miss Supranational Asia & Oceania; Miss St. George Hospitality; Top 12 – Miss Talent; Top 16 – Best National Costume	
2011	Daniela Nguyễn Thu Mây	Prague	3rd Runner-Up	1 Special Award: Top 10 – Miss Internet	
2009	Chung Thục Quyên	Hồ Chí Minh City	Top 15	2 Special Awards: Best National Costume; Miss Internet	

=== Miss Grand International ===
 Color keys
- : Declared as winner
- : Ended as runner-up
- : Ended as one of the finalists (top 10)
- : Ended as one of the semi-finalists (top 20)

Year	Miss Grand Vietnam	Province	Result	Prize	Ref.
2026	Emoura Phạm	Hồ Chí Minh City	4th Runner-Up	5 Special Awards: Top 3 – Country's Power of The Year; Top 15 – Best in Talent; Top 10 – Pre-Arrival; Top 10 – Grand Day Experience; Top 15 – Best in National Costume	
2025	Nguyễn Thị Yến Nhi	Đắk Lắk	Unplaced	3 Special Awards: Top 8 – Country's Power of the Year; Top 20 – Best National Costume; Top 20 – Best in Swimsuit	
2024	Võ Lê Quế Anh	Quảng Nam	Unplaced	6 Special Awards: 1st Runner-Up – Miss Popular Vote; Top 10 – Pre-Arrival; Top 10 – Best National Costume; Top 15 – Grand Voice Award; Top 16 – Country's Power of the Year; Top 20 – Best in Swimsuit	
2023	Lê Hoàng Phương	Khánh Hòa	4th Runner-Up	5 Special Awards: Winner – Best National Costume; Runner-Up – Country's Power of the Year; Top 05 – Pre-Arrival; Top 10 – Best in Swimsuit; Top 18 – Grand Voice Award	
2022	Đoàn Thiên Ân	Long An	Top 20	5 Special Awards: Winner – Country’s Power of the Year; Winner – Best National Costume; Top 05 – Miss Popular Vote; Top 10 – Pre-Arrival; Top 10 – Best in Swimsuit	
2021	Nguyễn Thúc Thùy Tiên	Hồ Chí Minh City	Winner	6 Special Awards: Winner – Miss Grand Pageant Insider's Choice Award; Winner – Best in Swimsuit (Fans Vote); Winner – Lottery Prizes Event; Top 05 – Pre-Arrival; Top 06 – Miss Popular Vote; Top 20 – Best National Costume	
2020	Nguyễn Lê Ngọc Thảo	Hồ Chí Minh City	Top 20	6 Special Awards: Winner – How to eat Thai food in 2 minute Challenge; Winner – How to get to know you in 1 minute Challenge; Top 05 – Miss Popular Vote; Top 06 – Best National Costume; Top 10 – Pre-Arrival; Top 20 – Best in Swimsuit	
2019	Nguyễn Hà Kiều Loan	Quảng Nam	Top 10	5 Special Awards: Winner – Miss Popular Vote; Top 10 – Best National Costume; Top 10 – Best in Swimsuit; Top 10 – Pre-Arrival; Top 22 – for Historic Crowns Fashion Show Gala	
2018	Bùi Phương Nga	Hanoi	Top 10	5 Special Awards: Winner – Miss Popular Vote; Top 05 – Hottest Contestants for Preliminary; Top 09 – Most-Liked and Shared Official Portrait Photos; Top 10 – Pre-Arrival; Top 12 – Best National Costume	
2017	Nguyễn Trần Huyền My	Hà Nội	Top 10	6 Special Awards: Winner – Miss Healthy & Beauty by Dr. Thanh (Sponsor); Top 03 – The Front Row of Opening Dance; Top 05 – Official Portraits; Top 05 – Pre-Arrival; Top 10 – Best National Costume; Top 11 – Best in Swimsuit	
2016	Nguyễn Thị Loan	Thái Bình	Top 20	1 Special Award: Top 10 – Best National Costume	
2015	Nguyễn Thị Lệ Quyên	Bạc Liêu	Unplaced		
2014	Cao Thùy Linh	Hồ Chí Minh City	Unplaced	1 Special Award: Winner – Best National Costume	
2013	Nguyễn Thị Bích Khanh	Tây Ninh	Unplaced		

=== Miss Intercontinental ===
 Color keys
- : Declared as Winner
- : Ended as Runner-up or Top 5
- : Ended as one of the finalists (Top 8/10)
- : Ended as one of the semi-finalists (Top 15)

Year	Miss Intercontinental Vietnam	Province	Result	Prize	Ref.
2026	Lê Thị Thu Trà	Nghệ An	TBA		
2025	Nguyễn Thị Thu Ngân	Cà Mau	Top 23	1 Special Award: Best in National Costume	
2024	Bùi Khánh Linh	Bắc Giang	3rd Runner-Up	1 Special Award: Miss Intercontinental Asia & Oceania	
2023	Lê Nguyễn Ngọc Hằng	Ho Chi Minh City	2nd Runner-Up	1 Special Award: Miss Intercontinental Asia & Oceania	
2022	Lê Nguyễn Bảo Ngọc	Can Tho	Winner	1 Special Award: Miss Intercontinental Asia & Oceania	
2021	Trần Hoàng Ái Nhi	Đắk Lắk	Unplaced	2 Special Awards: 2nd Place – Best Evening Gown; Top 5 – Miss Intercontinental Asia & Oceania	
2019	Nguyễn Thị Thúy An	Kiên Giang	Unplaced		
2018	Lê Âu Ngân Anh	Tiền Giang	4th Runner-up	1 Special Award: People's Choice	
2017	Nguyễn Đặng Tường Linh	Phú Yên	Top 18	1 Special Award: TGBC People's Choice	
2016	Nguyễn Thị Bảo Như	Kiên Giang	Unplaced		
2015	Lê Thị Hà Thu	Huế	Top 17	1 Special Award: Miss Popularity	
2014	Huỳnh Thúy Anh	Hanoi	Unplaced		
2005	Phạm Thị Thanh Hằng	Ho Chi Minh City	Unplaced		
2004	Châu Ánh Minh	Ho Chi Minh City	Unplaced		
2003	Bùi Thị Hoàng Oanh	Ho Chi Minh City	Unplaced		
