= Khiếu Thị Huyền Trang =

Vietnamese model

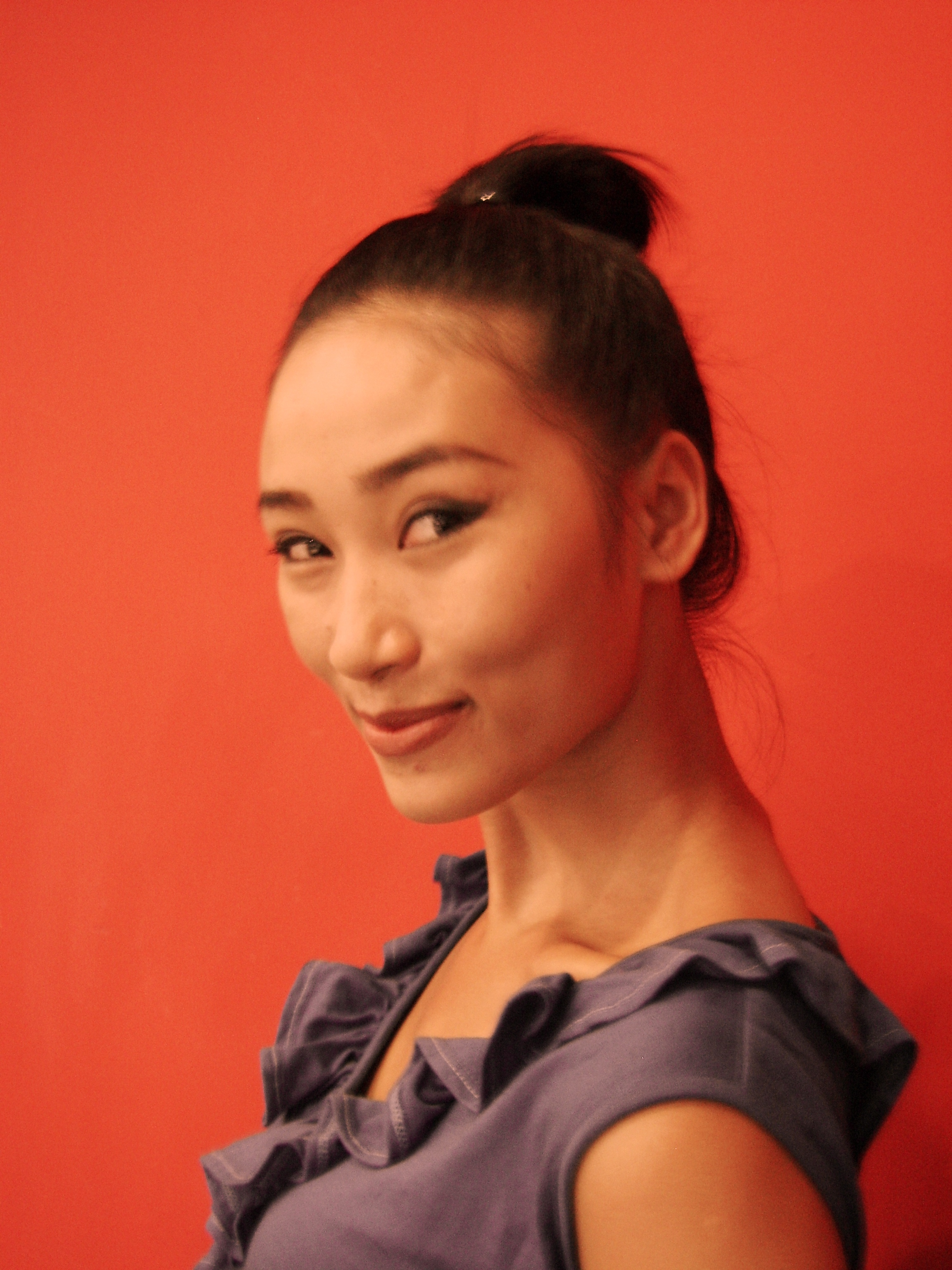
- Born: Khiếu Thị Huyền Trang; 26 December 1990 (age 35); Bắc Giang, Vietnam
- Other name: Trang Khiếu
- Occupations: Model; Fashion designer
- Years active: 2010–
- Known for: Winner of Vietnam's Next Top Model season 1
- Title: Vietnam's Next Top Model 2010

Khiếu Thị Huyền Trang (born December 26, 1990) known professionally as Trang Khiếu, is a Vietnamese model and fashion designer. She was the first winner of the Vietnam's Next Top Model 2010 competition. She previously won the Best Asian Model award at Best Model of the World 2011 and the Asian Model Star award at the Asia Festival Model Awards in 2015 in South Korea. She rose to fame by appearing on the covers of Vietnamese fashion magazines, such as Elle Vietnam, Harper's Bazaar Vietnam, Dep Magazine, and L'Officiel Vietnam.

== Career ==
In 2015, she launched her first collection in collaboration with the fashion brand Zalora. She played a creative role, providing design ideas, while Zalora handled production, marketing, and distribution. On May 14, the Trang Khieu Collection (TKC) officially launched at Air 360 Sky Bar. The model shared that this collection is like a diary of her travels. She had the opportunity to experience the diversity of world fashion during her tours and wanted to bring the free-spirited Western style to Vietnam. Each time she visited a new cultural region, Trang Khieu met people with different and interesting fashion styles. The main color palette of this collection is neutral tones such as white, black, and gray. The collection follows the "sport luxe" trend (sporty yet elegant).

On January 6, 2016, in Ho Chi Minh City, she launched her second collection, "Just Be," which subtly conveys the message to simply be what we want to be. "Just Be" brings individuality and youthfulness to the public through her designs. The collection primarily uses shades of gray, black, and beige. Her first modeling mentor, Vũ Nguyễn Hà Anh, participated in the fashion show, modeling for the collection. Ha Anh was invited to be the vedette.

In 2017, she, along with Kim Truc Nguyen, Maison An Dinh, Mi Dupz, and Mia Nguyen, launched a new collection on the evening of March 30 in Ho Chi Minh City. The collection was inspired by a poem Trang Khieu wrote about the desire to liberate oneself from inner repression. Trang Khieu shared the reason for launching the collection with her four friends: "Each individual in the group wants to learn and bring their own personality and freshness into the product." The main colors in the collection include red, blue, yellow, purple, and cream white.

== Magazines ==
Trang Khieu's list of magazine covers
Year	Magazine	Month
	Người đẹp	No 370
	Her World	05
	NAM	No 38
	Thế giới Văn Hóa	No 23
	Her World	02
2011	Cẩm nang mua	
2011	Mốt và cuộc sống	04
2011	Đẹp	10
2012	GF	
2012	Heritage Fashion	02
2012	Lửa Ấm	05
2012	Đẹp	05
2012	Đẹp	10
2012	Đẹp	11
2012	FAME	11
2013	Golf & Life	04
2013	JetstarPacific	07
2013	Her World	07
2013	Xe Thể Thao	08
2013	Đẹp	10
2013	Đẹp	11
2013	MỐT	11
2013	Men & Life	11
2014	Heritage Fashion	04-05
2014	WOVE	05
2014	Harper's Bazaar (Singapore)	06
2014	F fashion	08
2014	Đẹp	10
2014	Đẹp	11
2014	ELLE	11
2015	Cosmopolitan	05
2015	ELLE	06
2015	L'Officiel	08
2015	Đẹp	10
2015	Her World	11
2016	F Magazine	
2016	Harper's Bazaar	08
2016	Đẹp	08
2016	L'Officiel	09
2017	Travellive	01
2017	Golf & Life	03
2017	ELLE	05
2017	Harper's Bazaar	05
2017	Her World	06
2017	Business Woman	07
2018	Harper's Bazaar	12
2018	Golf & Life	
2019	L'Officiel	03

== Featured shows ==
Year	Role	Collection	Framework	Designer/Brand
2012	Vedette	Duy Nguyen Collection	Elle Fashion Show Fall/Winter 2012–2013	An Nhiên
2013	Vedette	An Nhien Collection	Thời trang và Đam mê	An Nhiên
2013	First Face	Stone	Thời trang và Đam mê	Hoàng Xuân Sơn
2013	First Face	Giao Linh Collection	Thời trang và Đam mê	Giao Linh
2013	First Face	Haute Couture	Thời trang và Đam mê	Võ Công Khanh
2013	Vedette	Eternal Passion	Thời trang và Đam mê	Phan Anh Tuấn
2013	Vedette	Thổ	Thời trang và Đam mê	Li Lam
2013	First Face	Aura ư	Thời trang và Đam mê	Thiều Dũng Nguyên Sang
2014	Vedette	BST Quốc Bình	Thời trang và Đam mê	Quốc Bình
2016	Vedette	BST ANNHA	Elle Fashion Journey 2016	Thương hiệu ANNHA
2016	Vedette	BST Giao Linh	Elle Fashion Journey 2016	Giao Linh

Awards and achievements
New title	Vietnam's Next Top Model; 2010	Succeeded by Hoàng Thị Thùy
