= Dương Trương Thiên Lý =

Vietnamese model

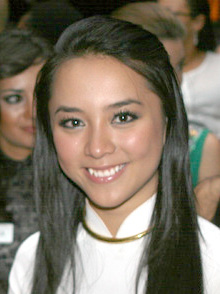
- Born: Dương Trương Thiên Lý; June 10, 1989 (age 37); Đồng Tháp, Vietnam
- Education: The Athenian School, United States; Saint Mary's University, United States
- Occupations: actress, director, model and beauty pageant titleholder
- Height: 1.69 m (5 ft 6 1/2 in)
- Spouse: Tony Nguyễn Quốc Toản (m. 2011)
- Children: 2
- Beauty pageant titleholder
- Title: 2nd Runner-up of Miss Universe Vietnam 2008
- Years active: 2008–
- Hair color: Black
- Eye color: Black
- Major competitions: Miss Universe Vietnam 2008 (2nd Runner-up); Miss World 2008 (Unplaced)

Dương Trương Thiên Lý (born 10 June 1989) is a Vietnamese actress, director, model and beauty pageant titleholder. Accordingly, she gained placement as 2nd runner-up in Miss Universe Vietnam 2008, and represented Vietnam in the Miss World 2008 pageant in South Africa.

== Education ==
From primary school, Lý studied at a Vietnamese-French bilingual school. In 9th grade, she spent nearly a month in France as part of a Vietnam-France cultural exchange program, which helped her develop strong French language skills. After finishing 11th grade, she went to study in the United States, where she attended the Athenian School, as a boarding student. After graduating she pursued a degree in communications at Saint Mary's College of California

== Miss Universe Vietnam 2008 ==
While placing 2nd runner-up in Miss Universe Vietnam 2008, Lý won Miss Photogenic in Miss Universe Vietnam 2008.

== Miss World 2008 ==
Lý was chosen to represent Vietnam in Miss World 2008 after the winner of Miss Vietnam 2008, Trần Thị Thùy Dung, was not allowed to represent Vietnam in international competitions because she had not graduated from high school, and the winner of Miss Universe Vietnam opted to continue her studies instead of competing.

Lý was informed that she had qualified for Miss World 2008 in November, and therefore had little time to prepare. She was unable to reach the semifinals. She won the title of People's Choice in the Miss World 2008 pageant. She later became the national director for Miss Vietnam Universe 2009 Võ Hoàng Yến, helping her prepare for Miss Universe.

== Career after ==
Im 2013, Lý became the National Director of Miss Universe in Vietnam.

== Personal life ==
In August 2011, Lý married Nguyễn Quốc Toàn (Tony Toàn), born in 1970 in Bình Định. He is a Vietnamese-Canadian businessman, the son of Trần Thị Hường (Tư Hường)—an entrepreneur and the owner of Hoàn Cầu Group and Nam Á Bank. The couple has two children.

Awards and achievements
Preceded by None	2nd Runner-up Miss Universe Vietnam; 2008	Succeeded by Đặng Thị Lệ Hằng
Preceded by Đặng Minh Thu	Miss World Vietnam; 2008	Succeeded by Trần Thị Hương Giang
