= Miss Universe Vietnam 2015 =

2nd Miss Universe Vietnam pageant

- Date: October 3, 2015
- Presenters: Phan Anh; Ngọc Diễm
- Entertainment: Đàm Vĩnh Hưng; Hồ Ngọc Hà; Thu Minh
- Venue: Crown Convention Center, Nha Trang, Khánh Hoà, Vietnam
- Broadcaster: VTV6
- Entrants: 70
- Placements: 15
- Winner: Phạm Thị Hương; Hải Phòng
- Congeniality: Trần Hằng Nga; Đồng Tháp
- Best National Costume: Nguyễn Trần Khánh Vân; Hồ Chí Minh City
- Photogenic: Đỗ Trần Khánh Ngân; Đồng Nai

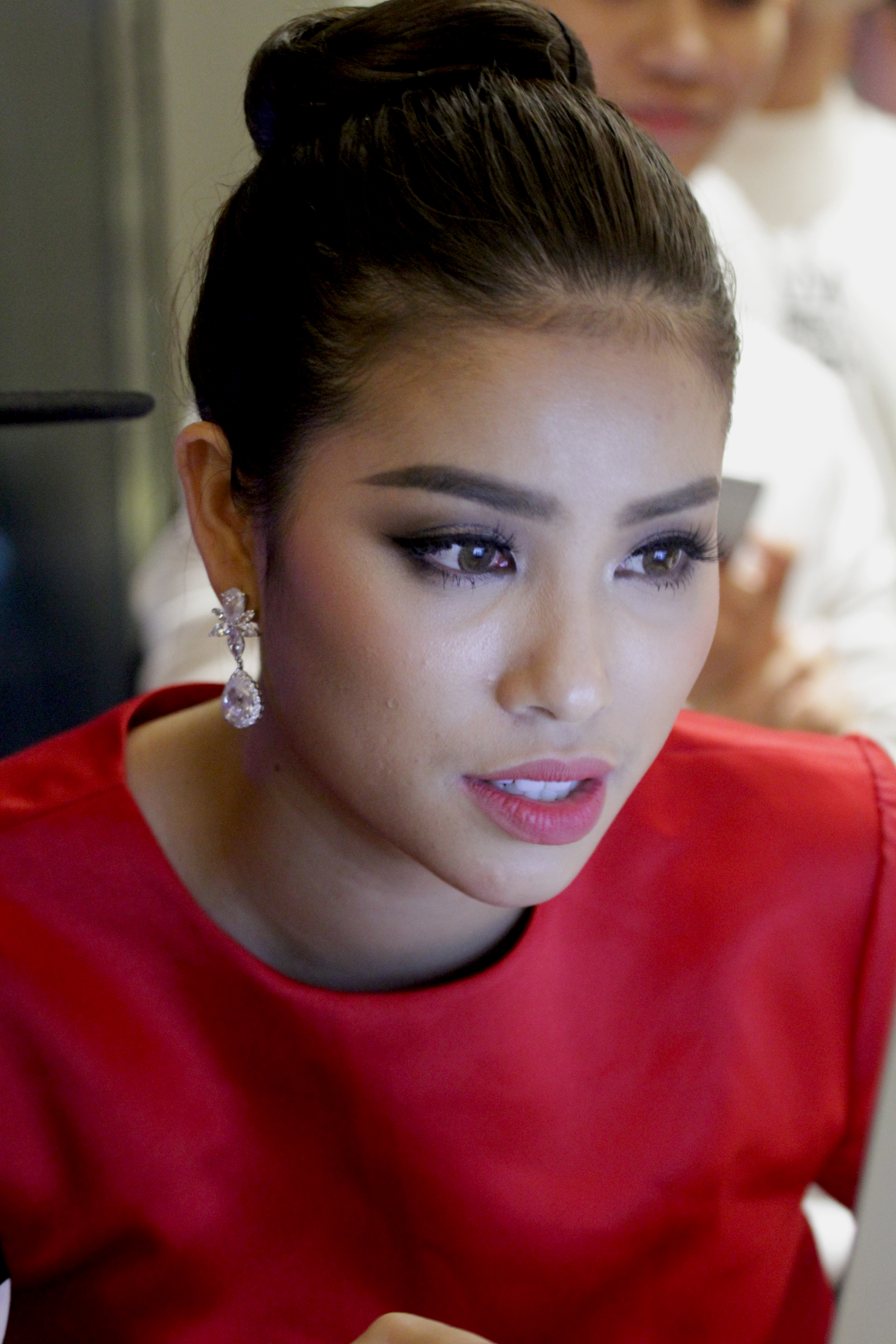
Phạm hương

Miss Universe Vietnam 2015 was the 2nd edition of the Miss Universe Vietnam pageant. After a 7-year hiatus, Miss Universe Vietnam returned in 2015. The grand finale was held on October 3, 2015 at Crown Convention Center, Nha Trang, the exact venue for Miss Universe 2008. Miss Universe Vietnam 2008 Nguyễn Thùy Lâm crowned her successor Phạm Thị Hương at the end of the event.

Phạm Thị Hương represented Vietnam at the Miss Universe 2015 competition in Las Vegas, United States. As the second runner-up, Đặng Thị Lệ Hằng was appointed as Miss Universe Vietnam 2016 to represent Vietnam at Miss Universe 2016. It was also considered as a beauty pageant edition which had the most successful delegates ever in the Top 15, many of whom represented Vietnam at the biggest international pageants: Nguyễn Thị Loan was chosen to be the country's representative at Miss Universe 2017 are 3rd runner up, she had represented Vietnam at Miss World 2014 (as Top 5 Miss Vietnam 2010) and Miss Grand International 2016 as 2nd Runner-up of Miss Ethnic Vietnam 2013; Nguyễn Thị Lệ Nam Em was the presentative at Miss Earth 2016 as Miss Mekong Delta 2015; Trương Thị Diệu Ngọc at Miss World 2016 as Miss Aodai Vietnam 2016; Đỗ Mỹ Linh at Miss World 2017 as Miss Vietnam 2016; Đỗ Trần Khánh Ngân crowned Miss Globe 2017 as Miss Tourism Vietnam 2017; Nguyễn Trần Khánh Vân at Miss Universe 2020 as Miss Universe Vietnam 2019 and the final one is Đặng Dương Thanh Thanh Huyền, the representative of Vietnam at Miss Charm 2023.

== Results ==
=== Placements ===
Color keys

- Declared as the winner in an International pageant.
- Ended as Runner-up in an International pageant.
- Ended as finalist or semifinalist in an International pageant.
- Unplaced.

Final result	Contestant	International pageant	International placement
Miss Universe Vietnam 2015	Phạm Thị Hương – Hải Phòng	Miss Universe 2015	Unplaced
1st Runner-Up	Ngô Trà My – Hà Nội		
2nd Runner-Up	Đặng Thị Lệ Hằng – Đà Nẵng	Miss Universe 2016	Unplaced
Top 5	Nguyễn Thị Loan – Thái Bình; Ngô Thị Trúc Linh – Sóc Trăng		
Top 10	Phạm Thị Ngọc Quý – Hồ Chí Minh City; Trương Thị Diệu Ngọc – Đà Nẵng; Nguyễn Trần Khánh Vân – Hồ Chí Minh City; Nguyễn Thị Lệ Nam Em – Tiền Giang; Trần Thị Kim Chi – Hải Phòng		
Top 15	Lê Thị Sang – Phú Yên; Đặng Dương Thanh Thanh Huyền – Khánh Hòa; Đỗ Trần Khánh Ngân – Đồng Nai; Đỗ Mỹ Linh – Hà Nội; Chế Nguyễn Quỳnh Châu – Lâm Đồng		

=== Special awards ===
Special Award	Contestant
Miss Beach	Phạm Thị Hương – Hải Phòng
Miss Áo Dài	Nguyễn Trần Khánh Vân – Hồ Chí Minh City
Miss Photogenic	Đỗ Trần Khánh Ngân – Đồng Nai
Miss Congeniality	Trần Hằng Nga – Đồng Tháp
People's Choice	Lê Thị Sang – Phú Yên

== Contestants ==
=== Top 45 final round ===
Contestants	Age	No.	Height (ft)	Hometown	Notes
Hoàng Bích Ngọc Ánh	20	102	1.67 m (5 ft 5 1/2 in)	Hà Nội	
Phương Tiểu Bình	22	107	1.68 m (5 ft 6 in)	Khánh Hòa	
Chế Nguyễn Quỳnh Châu	21	501	1.72 m (5 ft 7 1/2 in)	Lâm Đồng	
Trần Thị Kim Chi	23	721	1.73 m (5 ft 8 in)	Hải Phòng	
Trình Thị Mỹ Duyên	20	718	1.67 m (5 ft 5 1/2 in)	Tuyên Quang	
Nguyễn Thị Lệ Nam Em	19	206	1.71 m (5 ft 7 1/2 in)	Tiền Giang	
Trần Như Huỳnh Dao	21	135	1.69 m (5 ft 6 1/2 in)	An Giang	
Nguyễn Thị Hồng Hà	18	719	1.75 m (5 ft 9 in)	Quảng Ninh	
Đặng Thị Lệ Hằng	22	304	1.74 m (5 ft 8 1/2 in)	Đà Nẵng	Unplaced Miss Universe 2016
Hoàng Thị Hạnh	23	705	1.72 m (5 ft 7 1/2 in)	Nghệ An	
Phạm Thị Hương	24	120	1.74 m (5 ft 8 1/2 in)	Hải Phòng	Unplaced Miss Universe 2015
Đặng Dương Thanh Thanh Huyền	19	129	1.67 m (5 ft 5 1/2 in)	Khánh Hòa	
Nguyễn Thị Ngọc Huyền	18	318	1.74 m (5 ft 8 1/2 in)	Hà Nội	
Đặng Thị Mỹ Khôi	18	406	1.65 m (5 ft 5 in)	TP.HCM	
Đỗ Mỹ Linh	19	139	1.71 m (5 ft 7 1/2 in)	Hà Nội	
Ngô Thị Trúc Linh	23	121	1.71 m (5 ft 7 1/2 in)	Sóc Trăng	
Nguyễn Thùy Linh	20	100	1.73 m (5 ft 8 in)	Đồng Nai	
Nguyễn Thị Loan	25	337	1.75 m (5 ft 9 in)	Thái Bình	
Ngô Thị Quỳnh Mai	20	803	1.71 m (5 ft 7 1/2 in)	TP.HCM	
Ngô Trà My	23	312	1.78 m (5 ft 10 in)	Hà Nội	
Mai Yến My	19	249	1.73 m (5 ft 8 in)	Hà Nội	
Trần Hằng Nga	21	104	1.66 m (5 ft 5 1/2 in)	Đồng Tháp	
Đỗ Trần Khánh Ngân	21	137	1.71 m (5 ft 7 1/2 in)	Đồng Nai	
Nguyễn Phạm Kim Ngân	23	146	1.71 m (5 ft 7 1/2 in)	Bà Rịa–Vũng Tàu	
Dương Thị Kim Ngân	23	236	1.70 m (5 ft 7 in)	Bến Tre	
Trương Thị Diệu Ngọc	25	317	1.80 m (5 ft 11 in)	Đà Nẵng	
Nguyễn Thị Tuyết Ngọc	23	343	1.70 m (5 ft 7 in)	Vũng Tàu	
Nguyễn Hoài Nhi	21	121	1.72 m (5 ft 7 1/2 in)	Đồng Nai	
Nguyễn Thị Bảo Như *	23	142	1.69 m (5 ft 6 1/2 in)	Kiên Giang	
H'Ăng Niê	23	131	1.71 m (5 ft 7 1/2 in)	Đắk Lắk	
Bùi Thị Thảo Phương	20	321	1.80 m (5 ft 11 in)	Ninh Bình	
Lê Anh Phương	21	404	1.77 m (5 ft 9 1/2 in)	TP.HCM	
Nguyễn Thị Mai Phương	21	350	1.68 m (5 ft 6 in)	Đồng Nai	
Phạm Thị Ngọc Quý	20	110	1.75 m (5 ft 9 in)	TP.HCM	
Lê Thị Sang	21	108	1.74 m (5 ft 8 1/2 in)	Phú Yên	
Nguyễn Thị Thành	19	214	1.72 m (5 ft 7 1/2 in)	Bắc Ninh	
Đoàn Thị Ngọc Thảo	22	207	1.66 m (5 ft 5 1/2 in)	Khánh Hòa	
Võ Thị Minh Thư	21	433	1.65 m (5 ft 5 in)	Bến Tre	
Nguyễn Vân Trang	20	116	1.66 m (5 ft 5 1/2 in)	Hà Nội	
Trần Thị Huyền Trang	24	702	1.70 m (5 ft 7 in)	Hà Tĩnh	
Trần Thị Thùy Trang	18	623	1.80 m (5 ft 11 in)	Thừa Thiên Huế	
Phạm Lê Phương Trinh	21	722	1.66 m (5 ft 5 1/2 in)	TP.HCM	
Nguyễn Trần Khánh Vân	20	125	1.74 m (5 ft 8 1/2 in)	TP.HCM	
Nguyễn Thị Hồng Y	21	308	1.74 m (5 ft 8 1/2 in)	An Giang	
Bùi Thị Như Ý	21	130	1.69 m (5 ft 6 1/2 in)	Long An	

* Candidate withdrawals before the coronation night because of health problem.

=== Top 70 preliminary ===
Name	Age	No.	Height	Hometown	Notes
Lê Thị Hải Anh	20	117	1.70 m (5 ft 7 in)	Hà Nội	
Trần Thái Tâm Đan	20	504	1.70 m (5 ft 7 in)	TP.HCM	
Võ Hồng Ngọc Huệ	20	502	1.67 m (5 ft 5 1/2 in)	Phú Yên	
Trương Thị Ngọc Huyền	19	106	1.70 m (5 ft 7 in)	Ninh Bình	
Nguyễn Thị Vân Huyền	21	212	1.72 m (5 ft 7 1/2 in)	Bắc Ninh	
Trần Nhã Kỳ	19	615	1.69 m (5 ft 6 1/2 in)	Thừa Thiên Huế	
Nguyễn Thị My Lê	25	301	1.71 m (5 ft 7 1/2 in)	Quảng Nam	
Hoàng Thị Quỳnh Loan	18	626	1.71 m (5 ft 7 1/2 in)	Thừa Thiên Huế	
Vũ Thị Ngọc	23	118	1.72 m (5 ft 7 1/2 in)	Hải Dương	
Sơn Thị Dura	23	605	1.75 m (5 ft 9 in)	Trà Vinh	
Nguyễn Lê Sim	22	405	1.71 m (5 ft 7 1/2 in)	Kiên Giang	
Phạm Thị Sương	18	620	1.71 m (5 ft 7 1/2 in)	Đà Nẵng	
Chúng Huyền Thanh	18	109	1.75 m (5 ft 9 in)	Hải Phòng	
Nguyễn Thị Thơm	21	109	1.68 m (5 ft 6 in)	Nghệ An	
Võ Thị Minh Thư	21	433	1.65 m (5 ft 5 in)	Bến Tre	
Đinh Hồng Bích Thủy	19	209	1.69 m (5 ft 6 1/2 in)	TP.HCM	
La Bội Tiên	18	402	1.67 m (5 ft 5 1/2 in)	TP.HCM	
Trần Thị Thùy Trâm	19	217	1.67 m (5 ft 5 1/2 in)	Quảng Nam	
Phạm Nguyễn Đài Trang	20	222	1.66 m (5 ft 5 1/2 in)	Hà Tĩnh	
Nguyễn Vũ Hoài Trang	20	113	1.70 m (5 ft 7 in)	TP.HCM	
Lê Thu Trang	18	706	1.73 m (5 ft 8 in)	Hà Nội	
Phạm Thu Trang	23	715	1.65 m (5 ft 5 in)	Quảng Ninh	
Lê Thị Tươi	19	448	1.67 m (5 ft 5 1/2 in)	Hà Nam	
