= Hà Anh =

Vietnamese model (born 1982)

Vũ Nguyễn Hà Anh
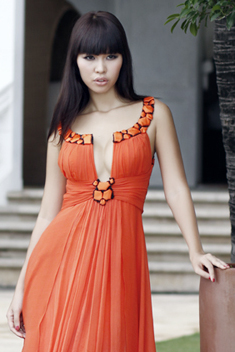
- Born: 10 April 1982 (age 44); Hanoi, Vietnam
- Occupations: Model; singer
- Height: 1.75 m (5 ft 9 in)
- Spouse: Oliver Dowden (m. 2016)
- Children: 1
- Beauty pageant titleholder
- Agency: MOT Models (2006–09)
- Hair colour: Sepia
- Eye colour: Sepia
- Major competitions: Miss Vietnam Photogenic 2005 (Top 10); Miss Earth 2006 (Unplaced); Miss Universe Vietnam 2008 (Top 10); Miss Vietnam Global 2008 (2nd Runner-up); Miss Debate with Navote 2022 (Winner)
- Website: haanhvu.com

Vũ Nguyễn Hà Anh (born 10 April 1982) is a Vietnamese model, singer, songwriter, tv host, author and beauty pageant titleholder. She has competed in some beauty contests at home and abroad, earning top 10 Miss Universe Vietnam 2008 and won the title of the 2nd Runner-up Miss Vietnam Global in the same year. Anh also has made contributions to Vietnamese fashion as one of the participants in the negotiation meeting with Elle France international team to bring Elle magazine to Vietnam.

Anh has also been host of Vietnam's Next Top Model 2010 season, judge of Elite Model Look Vietnam 2015, Miss World Vietnam 2016, Miss Universe Vietnam 2022 and Miss Global International in 2 consecutive years of 2015 – 2016.

== Early life and education ==
When Anh was nine, her grandmother gave her Michael Jackson's album Dangerous, sparking her a love for music. She studied at Hanoi – Amsterdam High School in Vietnam and abroad at Bromsgrove School in England. At the age of 18, Anh started working as a model at MOT Models in England, which is considered the starting point of her artistic career.

== Career ==
=== Modeling ===
Anh was spotted by MOT Models from "Best Potential Model" and "Face of Asia" contest in London. She has claimed that she has profound experience in gracing many major fashion shows, especially lingerie ones organized at London Fashion Week, Paris Fashion Week, New York Fashion Week, Hongkong Fashion Week, Shanghai Fashion Week; being the exclusive face for lingerie brands such as Rosy Paris, DKNY, formerly Redken Tribe; taking photoshoot for luxury fashion houses (such as Chloé, Gucci) and other renowned brands (including Lynx Clothing, Tony & Guy). She was invited to attend the New York Fashion Times and the launch event of the 20th America's Next Top Model in California, USA.

Anh appeared on the talk show Woody Talk broadcast in Thailand, paired with male MC Woody Milintachina of the Golden Temple country. Previously, she had been an MC in the show Style Setter of the TV channel Star World.

=== Beauty contests ===
She represented Vietnam at Miss Earth 2006 in the Philippines.In May 2008, she participated in the first Miss Universe Vietnam. She came in 10th and attracted controversy by quickly heading straight to the backstage instead of staying and cheering for the contestants who made it to top 5. She continued to participate in various contests and finally earned the 2nd Runner-Up of Miss Vietnam Global in 2008.

=== Musical ===
Her first public appearance as a singer was at Miss Earth 2006. On 28 November 2011, her first single was released as a DVD at Harper's Bazaar magazine. Her music video, Model (Take My Picture), is criticized for being provocative and low quality. Three days later, Hà Anh promoted herself in a minishow called It's Me, Hà Anh at the Park Hyatt Hotel.^{[7]} On 6 April 2012, Hà Anh held a second mini-show in Hanoi entitled From the Very Start, to release her eponymous second single. Her third single, "Put It on Me", was released in 2014 in a video co-starring the Hollywood actor Robert Parks-Valletta.

=== Television ===
In 2010, Anh, Huy Võ and Đức Hải were invited to replace the judges for the first season of Vietnam's Next Top Model.^{[10]} After the contest, Huy Võ and Hà Anh, assisted the winner, Huyền Trang, in establishing a business in New York.

Anh hosted "Hanh Ly Tinh Yeu" – "The Baggage Vietnam" season 3 broadcast on national commercial television channel VTV3 in Vietnam.

=== Writing ===
In 2013, Anh released her autobiography, a collection of her personal blog posted from the year she started her career and travelled the world to work until the time when she was back in Vietnam. In 2016, she published her second book "Song Trong The Gioi Dan Ong", which has since been reprinted four times.

== Magazines cover ==
Year	Magazine	No.	Month
1994	Thiếu niên Tiền phong	23	
2006	Thế giới phụ nữ	12/06	March
2006	Đẹp & Sức khỏe	1	May
2006	Thời trang trẻ - New Fashion		
2006	Thế giới Phụ nữ	45/06	November
2007	Sống mới	4	April
2007	Style		
2007	Mốt		
2008	Đẹp		October
2008	Phong cách		
2008	Mỹ thuật		
2008	Hàng hiệu - Premium		
2008	Thế giới Phụ nữ	16/08	May
2008	Đời sống Gia đình	424	
2008	Phụ nữ & Thể thao (Women & Sport)		November
2008	Thời trang trẻ	42 (420)	November
2009	Thế giới người nổi tiếng		
2009	Thương hiệu		
2009	Thế giới trong ta	335	August
2009	Thể thao Văn hóa & Đàn ông	47	September
2009	Phong cách Việt		
2009	Du lịch & giải trí	6	April
2009	Người nổi tiếng - Tạp chí Thế giới Điện ảnh	20	
2009	The World		November
2010	East World		February
2010	Cẩm nang mua sắm	185	July
2010	Heritage Fashion		April/May
2010	Hàng hiệu	5	May
2010	Style		
2010	Thời trang trẻ - Thế giới Mốt	11	November
2010	Delicious	4	
2010	Truyền hình VTV	185	November
2011	Charming - Duyên dáng Việt Nam		July
2011	Phong cách		March
2011	Thời trang trẻ		
2011	Hàng hiệu		
2011	Đẹp	150	July
2011	Style	66	September
2011	Người đẹp		
2011	Phong cách		November
2011	Style		November
2011	Thế giới Tiêu dùng	148	December
2011	Lửa ấm		12
2011	One2fly -VietjetAir Magazine		
2012	Fashion Collection	2	September
2012	Phong cách		
2012	Thế giới điện ảnh	18	October
2012	Heritage Fashion		August/September
2012	Style	29	
2012	Thế giới tiêu dùng		
2012	Women's Health		October
2013	Thể thao Văn hóa & Đàn ông		
2013	Aviation	2	March
2013	Mốt & Cuộc sống	107	April
2013	RSVP	21	
2013	Điện ảnh		
2013	Stuff	53	June
2013	Thể thao văn hóa & Đàn ông	93	July
2013	Gia đình & Trẻ em	31	August
2013	Thời trang trẻ - New Fashion	52 (733)	October
2013	Mốt & Cuộc sống	175	November
2013	Thế giới gia đình	41	
2013	V Style		December
2014	Menlife	23	June/July
2014	2! Đẹp		September
2014	ARIYANA		
2014	Herworld		October
2014	Thế giới thời trang	57 (803)	November
2014	Stuff	70	December
2014	Thanh niên		
2015	Sành điệu	167	June
2015	Phong cách		May
2015	Hàng hiệu		
2015	Mốt & Cuộc sống		March
2015	Người đẹp	371	May
2015	Herworld	187	July
2015	Thể thao Văn hóa & Đàn ông	201	January
2015	Thế giới điện ảnh		September
2015	Style		5
2015	Ơi Magazine (expats magazines)		12
2016	2! Đẹp	10	
2016	One2fly - VietjetAir Inflight Magazine	10 và 11	10 và 11
2016	Bác sĩ gia đình	35	5
2016	Menlife		1 và 2
2016	Sức khỏe	6	6
2016	Tiếp thị và gia đình	32	8
2017	Fashion Spell		
2018	Nữ doanh nhân	110	3
2018	Giáo dục - Mẹ & con	217	5
2019	Phong cách	110	2
2019	The Lotus	4	10
2019	Beautylife		5
2022	Genzo	1	5
2023	Harper’s Bazaar		6
2024	F Fashion		1 và 2

== Typical show ==
Year	Position	Collection	Show	Brand/Designer
2007	Model	Redken Tribe 07	Redken UK Show	Brand Redken
2008	Model	Lingerie Americas - New York	Lingerie Americas - New York Show	Brand Lingerie
2008	Model	Une Fleur, Des épines	Rosy Paris Show	Brand Rosy Paris
2009	Model	Hồi ức đêm	Fashion Show 2009 in Hanoi Intercontinental Hotel	NTK Hoàng Hải
2009	Model	Bóng đêm	HD Fashion Show 2009 in Hanoi Daewoo Intercontinental Hotel	NTK Hoàng Hải
2009	Center & Vedette	Secret of the night (Bí ẩn đêm)	Đêm hội chân dài 3	
2009	Vedette	Gosto	Triển lãm áo cưới	Thương hiệu Gosto
2009	Vedette	As I am	Đẹp Fashion Show 8	NTK Hà Trương
2010	Vedette		Viet’s Beauty Fashion Show in London	NTK Hoàng Hải
2010	Vedette	Motor	Vietnam Motor Show	Nhiều Brand Motor
2010	First Face	Axara Paris	Fashion Show in Saigon Centre	Axara Paris Brand
2010	Model	Mây	Đẹp Fashion Show 9	NTK Đỗ Mạnh Cường
2010	Model	Du mục	Đẹp Fashion Show 9	NTK Julian Kunze (Đức)
2010	Vedette	Câu chuyện kể	Đẹp Fashion Show 9	NTK Lưu Anh Tuấn
2010	First Face & Vedette	Open Elite Fitness Grand	Elite Fitness Grand opening	Elite Fitness Brand
2010	First Face & Center	Moschino Trunk	Moschino Trunk Show	Moschino Brand
2010	Vedette	Các nàng công chúa thủy cung	Đêm phong cách - Fashion Show Tạp chí Phong cách	Gosto Brand
2010	First Face	Axara Paris	Fashion Show in Saigon Centre	Axara Paris Brand
2011	Model	Marc Jacobs	Marc Jacobs Show	Marc Jacobs Brand
2011	Vedette	Escada cruise	Escada Cruise Show	Escada Brand
2011	Vedette	Rừng thu	Sense Fashion Show	NTK Hoàng Hải
2011	Vedette	Công chúa ếch	Sense Fashion Show	NTK Kelly Bùi
2011	First Face & Vedette	Ký ức mùa hè - BST Spring Summer	Ella Fashion Show	NTK Hà Trương
2011	Vedette	Ký ức mùa hè - BST Spring Summer	Ella Fashion Show	NTK Hà Lê (LEA’S Brand)
2011	Vedette	Cân bằng	Davines Hair Show	Davines Brand - Nhà tạo mẫu tóc Trần Hùng
2011	Vedette	Điều kỳ diệu - BST Fall Winter	Elle Fashion Show	NTK Tom K Nguyen
2011	First Face	Điều kỳ diệu - BST Fall Winter	Elle Fashion Show	NTK Phương Mỹ
2011	Vedette	Yves Saint Laurent Collection (YSL)	Milano Fashion Show Thu Đông	Yves Saint Laurent (YSL) Brand & John Galliano
2011	Model	Dolce& Gabbana	Milano Fashion Show Thu Đông	Dolce& Gabbana Brand
2011	Vedette	Thoát xác	Đẹp fashion Show 10	NTK Hải Long và Thế Huy
2011	Vedette	Beelieve	Đẹp fashion Show 10	NTK Andrian Anh Tuấn
2011	Vedette	Eva de Eva Fall Winter	Eva & Eva Fashion Show Fall Winter	Eva de Eva Brand
2012	First Face	Valenciani - Xuân Hè 2012	Elle Fashion Show Fall Winter	NTK Adrian Anh Tuấn
2012	Vedette	Valenciani - Xuân Hè 2012	Elle Fashion Show Fall Winter	NTK Chan Luu
2012	Vedette	Summer Brezze. 6	Summer Brezze Fashion Show Eva & Eva	Eva de Eva Brand
2012	Vedette	Lung linh sắc Việt	Đại nhạc hội Lung Linh Sắc Việt	NTK Kelly Bùi
2012 - 2013	First Face & Vedette	Eva de Eva Unique	Eva & Eva Fashion Show Fall Winter 2012/2013	Eva de Eva Brand & NTK Nguyễn Diệu Huyền
2013	Vedette	Người trở về từ London	Đẹp Fashion Show 11	NTK Giao Linh
2013	Vedette	Báu vật đại dương	Đẹp Fashion Show 11	NTK Trương Thanh Long
2013	Vedette	Eva de Eva Summer Night	Eva de Eva Summer Night	Nguyễn Diệu Huyền
2013	First Face	Eva de Eva Summer Night	Eva de Eva Summer Night	NTK Phương Anh
2013	First Face & Vedette	Mùi Hương	Thời trang & Đam mê	NTK Lek Chi
2013	First Face & Vedette	Đỏ, Trắng, Đen	Thời trang & Đam mê	NTK Angel Phan
2013	Vedette	Bonjour Saigon	Thời trang & Đam mê	Joilipoli Brand - Phạm Đăng Anh Thư
2013	Vedette	Kiêu kỳ	Thời trang & Đam mê	NTK Anh Thư
2013	Vedette		Thời trang & Đam mê	NTK Đinh Bách Đạt
2013	Vedette	Haute Couture (Hulos)	Thời trang & Đam mê	Hulos Brand - NTK Hải Long & Thế Huy
2013	Vedette	Black Rose	Thời trang & Đam mê	NTK Hoàng Minh Hà
2013	Vedette	Mùa hè trắng	Thời trang & Đam mê	NTK Tạ Nguyên Phúc
2013	Vedette	D.U.Y Boutique ombre	Thời trang & Đam mê	Thương hiệu - NTK Nguyễn Trường Duy
2013	Vedette	Mùa Xuân Hè 2014	Thời trang & nhân vật	NTK Trương Anh Vũ
2014	First Face	White On White	Thời trang & nhân vật	NTK Nguyễn Hà Nhật Huy
2013	Vedette	Genova Jeans	Genviet Jeans Show 2013	Genviet Jeans Brand
2014	Vedette	Eva de Eva Fall Winter	Đẹp Fashion Runway	Eva de Eva Brand
2014	First Face & Vedette	Heritage Space	Heritage Space Event	NTK Hà Trương
2014	First Face	Khu vườn bí ẩn	Thời trang & Đam mê	NTK Cao Minh Tiến
2014	Vedette	Mặt nạ tuồng	Thời trang & Đam mê	Hulos Brand - NTK Hải Long & Thế Huy
2014	Vedette	Nhịp sống	Thời trang & Đam mê	NTK Văn Ngời & Bảo Thạch
2014	Vedette	Spring 2014	Thời trang & Đam mê	DEVON London Brand -NTK Devon Nguyễn
2014	Vedette	Seduction 2	Thời trang & Đam mê	NTK An Nhiên
2014	Vedette	Đông thời với Lụa	Thời trang & Đam mê	NTK Quỳnh Paris
2014	Vedette	Bonjour Vietnam - Chào Việt Nam Đất nước vì hòa bình	Eva De Eva fashion Show	Eva de Eva Brand
2015	Vedette	Tiny Ink Fall Winter 2015	Thời trang & nhân vật	Thương hiệu Tiny Ink by Hoàng Quyên
2015	First Face	Xưa và nay	Genviet Jeans Show - Kỉ niệm 5 năm	Genviet Jeans Brand
2015	First Face & Vedette	Harley Davidson	Harley Davidson Fashion Show	Harley Davidson & Black Label Brands
2015	Vedette	Grandiôse	Lancôme Paris 80 năm	Thương hiệu Lancome
2016	Vedette	Just Be	Thời trang & nhân vật	NTK & Model Trang Khiếu
2016	Vedette	Napla	Senses By Michael Barnes Powered By Napla Japan - Napla Hair Show	Nhà tạo mẫu tóc Michael Barnes & NTK Kelly Bui & NTK Hồ Thanh Phương
2016	First Face & Vedette	Awakening Soul	The dream of Santorini	Eva de Eva Brand (5 Nhà thiết kế)
2016	First Face & Vedette	Nature Inspired	The dream of Santorini	Eva de Eva Brand (5 Nhà thiết kế)
2016	First Face & Vedette	Lovely Santorini	The dream of Santorini	Eva de Eva Brand (5 Nhà thiết kế)
2017	Vedette	Docle Vita Xuân Hè 2017	Vietnam International Fashion Week	Thương hiệu XITA
2019	Vedette	Bộ sưu tập Xuân Hè 2019	BIB Show	NTK Vicent Đào
2019	Vedette	I'am Superstar	Chung Thanh Phong Fashion Week	NTK Chung Thanh Phong
2020	First Face & Vedette	Untamed	Runway Fashion Week	Thương hiệu XITA by NTK Katy Nguyễn
2020	Vedette	Rose & Childs	Vietnam International Fashion Festival	NTK Tuấn Trần
2021	Vedette	LOVE Swimwear by Ha Anh Vu (1 Year Anniversary)	LOVE Swimwear by Ha Anh Vu	NTK Hà Trương & Hà Anh (LOVE Swimwear)
2021	First Face	Sun & Moon	Vietnam International Fashion Week	Thương hiệu I.H.F (Hoàng Ku và NTK Kiko Nhung Nguyễn)
2021	Vedette	HipHop	RAP Hip Hop Fashion Show	NTK Võ Sơn Hoàng Tuân
2021	Vedette	Luxy Nguyen Kids 2021	International Fashion Runway	NTK Luxy Nguyen
2022	Vedette	Little Sailors	Pink Ocean - Pink Show 3	NTK Phan Nguyễn Minh Quân (Wuan Phan)
2022	Vedette	The Glory – Road To The Stars	The Glory – Road to the stars	NTK Nguyễn Minh Tuấn
2022	Vedette	Kwang - In The Middle Of The Galaxy	Extra Men Show	NTK Vương Khang
2022	Vedette	I AM … YOURS	Vietnam International Fashion Festival	NTK Đức Duy
2022	Vedette	Kwang Under The Sea	The Kwang Fashion Show	NTK Vương Khang
2023	Vedette	Mị Ban	Asian Kids Fashion Week 2023	NTK Ngô Mạnh Đông Đông
2023	Vedette	Hoa của biển	Fashion Chau Loan by the sea	NTK Châu Loan

== Discography ==
Year	Song
2011	"Model (Take My Picture)"
2012	"From the Very Start"
2014	"Put It on Me", third single

Awards and achievements
Preceded by Đào Thanh Hoài	Miss Earth Vietnam; 2006	Succeeded by Trương Tri Trúc Diễm
