= Miss Universe Vietnam =

National beauty pageant competition in Vietnam

- Formation: 2023; 3 years ago
- Headquarters: Ho Chi Minh City
- Location: Vietnam
- Official language: Vietnamese
- Owner: Miss Grand International Public Company Limited
- President & National Director: Nawat Itsaragrisil
- Manager: Phạm Duy Khánh
- Affiliations: Miss Universe
- Website: missuniversevietnam.org

Miss Universe Vietnam is a national beauty pageant in Vietnam to select the country's representative to Miss Universe, one of the Big Four major international beauty pageants. Along with Miss Vietnam and Miss World Vietnam, Miss Universe Vietnam is one of the Big Three national beauty pageants.

The current Miss Universe Vietnam titleholder is Hương Giang from Hanoi. She was the first Asian transgender woman to compete in the Miss Universe pageant. She represented Vietnam at the Miss Universe 2025 pageant in Bangkok, Thailand on 21 November 2025.

== History ==
=== 2008-2022: Hoa hậu Hoàn vũ Việt Nam ===
In 2008, Công ty Cổ phần Hoàn vũ Nha Trang was granted the national license by the Miss Universe Organization to host Miss Universe Vietnam under the Vietnamese name Hoa hậu Hoàn vũ Việt Nam.

The first official contest was held at the Vinpearl Land resort in Nha Trang on 31 May 2008, with 20 contestants participating. The final included four competitions: evening gown, swimsuit, áo dài, and interview. The winner, Nguyễn Thùy Lâm, was host delegate for the Miss Universe 2008 pageant held 14 July 2008, also in Nha Trang.

There was no contest held from 2009 to 2014, so the winner or runners-up of either Miss Universe Vietnam or any other national pageant could be appointed as Miss Universe Vietnam.

Miss Universe Vietnam 2015 was held on 3 October 2015, at Crown Convention Center in Nha Trang, Vietnam, and organised by Công ty Cổ phần Hoàn vũ Sài Gòn (Unicorp).

From 2017, the pageant was accompanied by a reality television series called I Am Miss Universe Vietnam, in which contestants are put through different challenges and training programs in each weekly episode.

Until 2022, the pageant selected the country's representative for Miss Universe. The pageant changed its current English name, Miss Cosmo Vietnam after losing the license in 2023.

=== 2023-present ===
In 2023, the Vietnamese Miss Universe franchise was granted to a new license holder. However, Hoa hậu Hoàn vũ Việt Nam continued to be held as a standalone pageant under the new title - Miss Cosmo Vietnam. The winner of Hoa hậu Hoàn vũ Việt Nam would no longer be Miss Universe Vietnam and the new Miss Universe Vietnam competition would abandoned its Vietnamese name.

== Titleholders ==
- Miss Universe Vietnam
- Miss Universe Vietnam & Miss Supranational Vietnam
- Miss World Vietnam
- Miss International Vietnam

Year	Winner	Runner Up		Venue	Number of contestants
Year	Winner	First	Second	Venue	Number of contestants
2008	Nguyễn Thùy Lâm (Thái Bình)	Võ Hoàng Yến (Hồ Chí Minh City)	Dương Trương Thiên Lý (Đồng Tháp)	Vinpearl Event Hall, Nha Trang, Khánh Hòa	20
2015	Phạm Thị Hương (Hải Phòng)	Ngô Trà My (Hà Nội)	Đặng Thị Lệ Hằng (Đà Nẵng)	Crown Convention Center, Nha Trang, Khánh Hòa	44*
2017	H'Hen Niê (Đắk Lắk)	Hoàng Thị Thùy (Thanh Hóa)	Mâu Thị Thanh Thủy (Hồ Chí Minh City)	Crown Convention Center, Nha Trang, Khánh Hòa	42*
2019	Nguyễn Trần Khánh Vân (Hồ Chí Minh City)	Nguyễn Huỳnh Kim Duyên (Cần Thơ)	Phạm Hồng Thúy Vân (Hồ Chí Minh City)	Crown Convention Center, Nha Trang, Khánh Hòa	44*
2022	Nguyễn Thị Ngọc Châu (Tây Ninh)	Lê Thảo Nhi (Hồ Chí Minh City)	Huỳnh Phạm Thủy Tiên (Đồng Tháp)	Saigon Exhibition and Convention Center, District 7, Ho Chi Minh City	41
2023	Bùi Quỳnh Hoa (Hà Nội)	Nguyễn Thị Hương Ly (Gia Lai)	Trịnh Thị Hồng Đăng (Hồ Chí Minh City)	Hoà Bình Theater, District 10, Ho Chi Minh City	18
2024	Nguyễn Cao Kỳ Duyên (Nam Định)	Nguyễn Quỳnh Anh (Hà Nội)	Vũ Thúy Quỳnh (Điện Biên)	Phú Thọ Indoor Stadium, District 11, Ho Chi Minh City	33

- Candidate(s) withdrawal(s) because of health problems.

=== Regional rankings ===
Province	Title	Year
Nam Định	1	2024
Hà Nội	1	2023
Tây Ninh	1	2022
Hồ Chí Minh City	1	2019
Đắk Lắk	1	2017
Hải Phòng	1	2015
Thái Bình	1	2008

== Vietnam's representatives at Miss Universe ==
Color keys

- : Declared as Winner
- : Ended as runner-up or top 5/6 qualification
- : Ended as one of the finalists or semifinalists
- : Ended as special awards winner

The winner of Miss Universe Vietnam represents her country at the Miss Universe. On occasions when the official contest was not held, the winner or runners-up of either Miss Universe Vietnam or any other national pageant would be appointed as Miss Universe Vietnam to compete at Miss Universe by the license holder.

Year	Miss Universe Vietnam	Province	National title	Result	Prize	Ref.
2026	Nguyễn Quỳnh Anh	Hanoi	Miss Universe Vietnam 2026	Did not compete		
2025	Hương Giang Nguyễn	Hanoi	Appointed: (Miss International Queen 2018)	Unplaced		
2024	Nguyễn Cao Kỳ Duyên	Nam Định	Miss Universe Vietnam 2024	Top 30	1 Special Award: * Best National Costume (3rd Place)	
2023	Bùi Quỳnh Hoa	Hanoi	Miss Universe Vietnam 2023	Unplaced		
2023	Lê Thảo Nhi	Ho Chi Minh City	Appointed: (1st Runner-up Miss Universe Vietnam 2022)	Did not compete		
2022	Nguyễn Thị Ngọc Châu	Tây Ninh	Miss Universe Vietnam 2022	Unplaced	1 Special Award: * Swimsuit Cape Vote	
2021	Nguyễn Huỳnh Kim Duyên	Cần Thơ	Appointed: (1st Runner-up Miss Universe Vietnam 2019)	Top 16	1 Special Award: * Fan Vote Winner	
2020	Nguyễn Trần Khánh Vân	Hồ Chí Minh City	Miss Universe Vietnam 2019	Top 21	1 Special Award: * Fan Vote Winner	
2019	Hoàng Thị Thùy	Thanh Hóa	Appointed: (1st Runner-up Miss Universe Vietnam 2017)	Top 20		
2018	H'Hen Niê	Đắk Lắk	Miss Universe Vietnam 2017	Top 5		
2017	Nguyễn Thị Loan	Thái Bình	Appointed: (2nd Runner-up Miss Ethnic Vietnam 2013 Top 5 Miss Universe Vietnam 2015)	Unplaced		
2016	Đặng Thị Lệ Hằng	Đà Nẵng	Appointed: (2nd Runner-up Miss Universe Vietnam 2015)	Unplaced	1 Special Award: * Best National Costume (Top 12)	
2016	Ngô Trà My	Hà Nội	Appointed: (1st Runner-up Miss Universe Vietnam 2015)	Did not compete		
2015	Phạm Thị Hương	Hải Phòng	Miss Universe Vietnam 2015	Unplaced		
2014	Nguyễn Lâm Diễm Trang	Vĩnh Long	Appointed: (2nd Runner-up Miss Vietnam 2014)	Did not compete		
2013	Trương Thị May	Hồ Chí Minh City	Appointed: (1st Runner-up Miss Ethnic Vietnam 2007)	Unplaced		
2012	Lưu Thị Diễm Hương	Hồ Chí Minh City	Appointed: (Miss Vietnam World 2010)	Unplaced		
2011	Vũ Thị Hoàng My	Đồng Nai	Appointed: (1st Runner-up Miss Vietnam 2010)	Unplaced		
2010	Phạm Thị Thanh Hằng	Đà Nẵng	Appointed: (Miss Vietnam Photogenic 2002)	Did not compete		
2009	Võ Hoàng Yến	Hồ Chí Minh City	Appointed: (1st Runner-up Miss Universe Vietnam 2008)	Unplaced		
2008	Nguyễn Thùy Lâm	Thái Bình	Miss Universe Vietnam 2008	Top 15	2 Special Awards: Miss Ao Dai (Top 5); Best national costume (Top 10)	
Did not compete between 2006—2007
2005	Phạm Thu Hằng	Hà Nội	Appointed: (Miss Hanoi-Vietnam 2005)	Unplaced		
2005	Bùi Thị Diễm	Cần Thơ	Appointed: (Miss Vietnam Photogenic 2004)	Did not compete		
2004	Hoàng Khánh Ngọc	Hải Dương	Appointed: (Gold-prize Supermodel Vietnam 2004)	Unplaced	1 Special Award: Best Catwalk	
2004	Nguyễn Thị Hồng Vân	Hà Nội	Appointed: (Miss Hanoi 2003)	Did not compete		
Did not compete between 2002—2003
2001	Phan Thu Ngân	Ho Chi Minh City	Appointed: (Miss Vietnam 2000)	Did not compete		

== See also ==
- List of Vietnam representatives at international women beauty pageants
