= Hanoi–Amsterdam High School =

Hanoi–Amsterdam High School for the Gifted
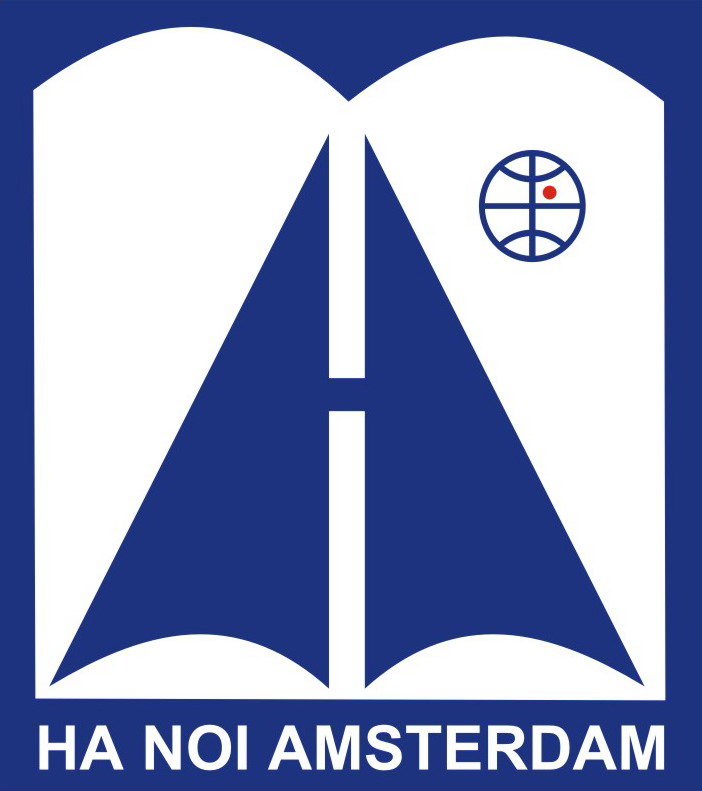
- Seal

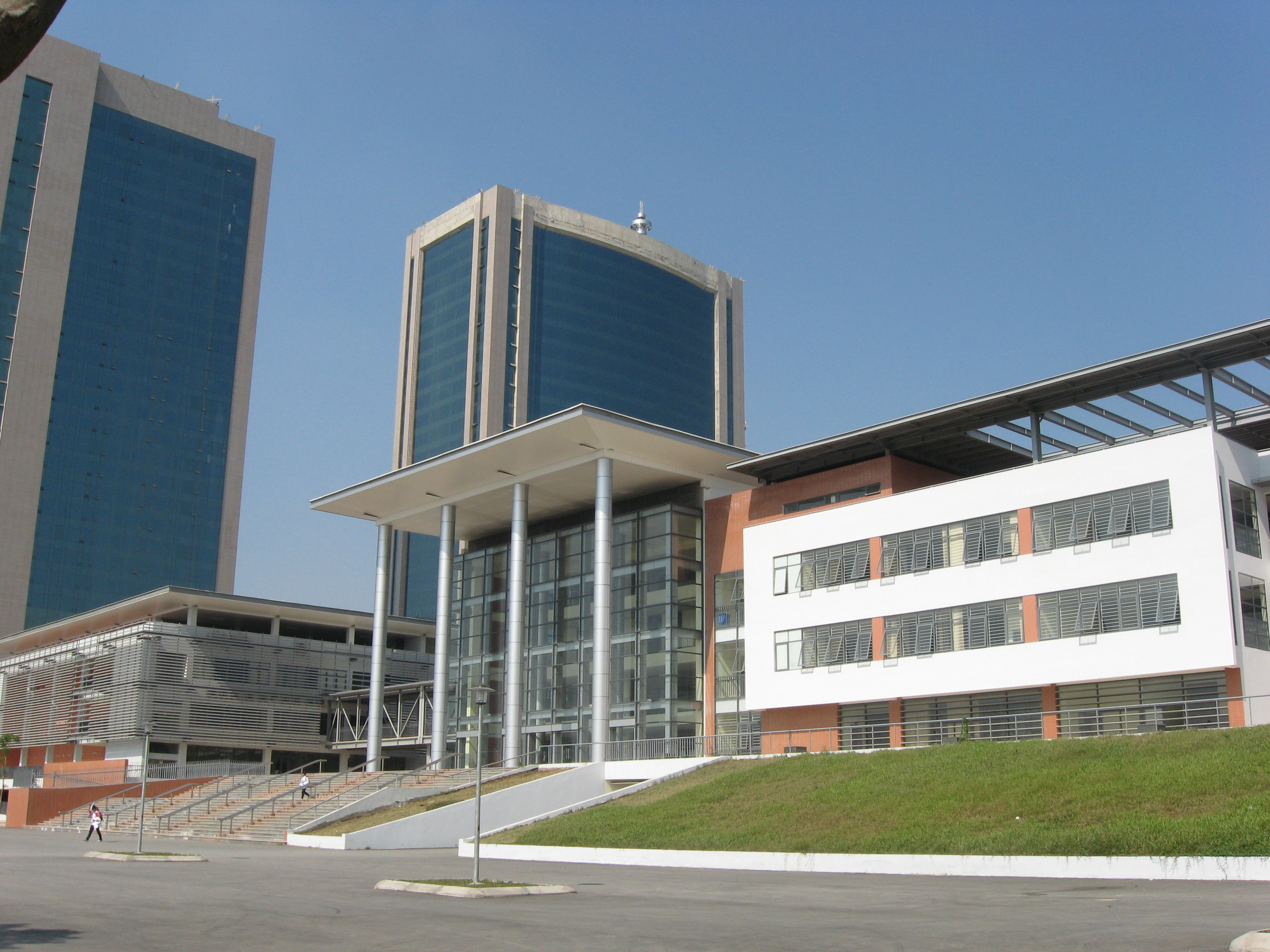

Location
- Hoàng Minh Giám Street, Yên Hòa Ward; Hanoi; Vietnam; 21°00′24″N 105°47′53″E

Information
- Type: Public
- Motto: "Nơi khởi đầu ước mơ" (Where dreams begin)
- Established: 1985; 41 years ago
- Principal: Trần Thùy Dương
- Faculty: 190
- Grades: 6-12
- Enrollment: approx. 3,000
- Website: Hnarms.edu.vn

Hanoi–Amsterdam High School for the Gifted (Vietnamese: Trường trung học phổ thông chuyên Hà Nội–Amsterdam) is one of the four regional magnet schools in Hanoi, Vietnam. It is regarded as one of the most prestigious and highly ranked academically selective high schools in Vietnam, from Hanoi.

== History ==
In 1972, as the Vietnam War was in one of its most brutal periods, Hanoi was under heavy bombardment by the US Air Force. Dr. I. Samkalden, the mayor of Amsterdam, the Netherlands, started a campaign to mobilize Dutch people to donate for the establishment of a high school in Hanoi to express their support to its citizens. The result of this campaign was the founding of Hanoi – Amsterdam High School. September 5, 1985, marked the official commencement of the first school year at Hanoi – Amsterdam High School.

In its first year, the school accepted gifted students specializing in Mathematics, Physics, Chemistry, Biology, Literature, English and Russian from other schools in Hanoi. Over time, the school gained its reputation as a premier education hub in Hanoi for its selectivity and dynamic student body, having nurtured several generations of high-accomplishing alumnae in diverse fields locally and abroad.

For its achievements, the school received the 3rd degree Labor Order (1995), the 2nd degree Labor Order (2000), the 1st degree Labor Order (2005), and the title of Hero of Labor (2000) from the Vietnamese government.

In 2010, the school's was relocated to a new campus at Hoang Minh Giam street in commemoration of Millennial Anniversary of Hanoi.

From 2023, the school no longer accepts middle school classes for incoming students between 6th to 9th grade. The existing middle school classes continue to operate until June 2027.

== Curriculum ==
The school has two levels:

=== Middle school level ===
There are 20 preparatory classes for students of grades 6 to 9. Each year, the school selects gifted students from elementary schools based on competitive examinations. Out of approximately 4,000 students, the top 200 scorers are accepted, making the acceptance rate as low as 5%. These students enjoy the same education standards and are taught by the same faculty as their peers at the high school level.

Throughout 6th and 7th grade, students will get to enroll in one academic club which does not affect their GPA. As of 2012, students can decide among mathematics in English, elementary Chinese, football (soccer), basketball, and tennis. Students will also take quality-check exams periodically to re-determine which class they will be in during 8th and 9th grade. As of 2018, there are two tracks for students to choose from: natural sciences (three classes) and social sciences & humanities (two classes). Regardless of the track they choose, students can enroll in any academic club the school offers, which consists of mathematics, physics, chemistry, English, and literature.

8th- and 9th-grade students can choose to compete in the Hanoi Middle School Academic Competition. Averaging at 20 students per subject, competing teams will take one test at the regional level and one test at the municipal level against teams from other districts. Students from Hanoi–Amsterdam High School are known to perform exceedingly well, often winning multiple first prizes and top scorers in mathematics, physics, chemistry, biology, English, and computer science. The selection process is very rigorous and is also known to prepare students for their high school entrance exams.

As of April 2, 2024 however, Hanoi has stopped accepting new students to Hanoi-Amsterdam's 6th grade as per the Vietnamese Ministry of Education and Training new regulations.

=== High school level ===
Students are specialized in one of the 14 following subject areas: literature, mathematics, computer science, physics, chemistry, biology, Russian, English, French, Chinese, Japanese, geography, and history. Admission is based on the city-wide High School Entrance Examination conducted by the Hanoi Department of Education and Training, with another 90-minute examination on basic English proficiency and additional advanced-level papers in the applicant's intended major. There are a total number of five exams taken on three consecutive days. The acceptance rate is often as low as 3% for the more selective classes, such as English, chemistry, physics, and mathematics. Because of the competitive nature, these majors have two classes (for example, Chemistry 1 and Chemistry 2). All 10th-grade students have to take two quality-check tests (one in November, the other at the end of the school year), the results of which, when combined with their GPA for the major, can re-determine which class the student is in, in their next year. There is no difference in curriculum between the two 10th-grade English, chemistry, physics, and mathematics classes. Starting from grade 11, class 2 will follow an easier, yet still more advanced than basics, major curriculum, while class 1 continues to pursue the specialized major curriculum. The French major has a bilingual class (called French 2) wherein certain subjects are taught in French.

All classes study from 7:30 AM to 12 PM from Monday to Saturday, with most classes having afternoon seminars for two hours, twice per week. Students are required to present from good to excellent study results in all thirteen subjects to remain at the school and are encouraged to explore their specialized subjects in-depth, with opportunities to take part in national and international competitions. After three years, most students enter their favorite universities, many of which are abroad.

=== Dual degree program ===
Starting in the 2018–2019 academic year, the school has agreed with the Ministry of Education to open two more classes (called the Oxford Class and the Cambridge Class in the High School level, and Liverpool Class and Manchester Class for the Middle School level) for the Dual Degree program. On top of the curriculum as described above, students in the Middle School Level will study with the GCSE curriculum, while those in the High School Level will study for the GCE Advanced Level.

== Campus ==
=== Academic facilities ===
The current campus features:

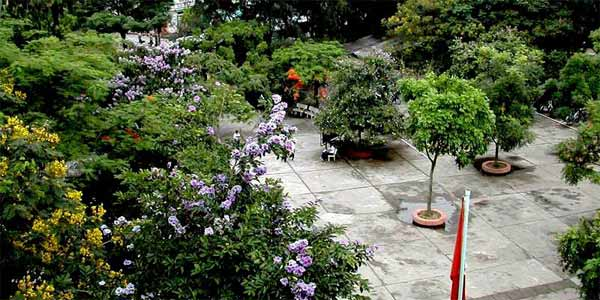
The main quad in the previous campus in Ba Dinh

- Three academic wings with a total of 45 classrooms
- Laboratories for physics, chemistry, and biology
- A 700-seat auditorium
- A 200-seat auditorium
- A 100-seat auditorium

=== Athletic facilities ===
The school has a soccer field, tennis court, and an indoor gym with a badminton court, volleyball courts, a basketball court, and a swimming pool.

== Notable alumni ==
- Van H. Vu – Mathematician
- Vũ Hà Anh – Supermodel and singer
