= Phạm Hương =

Miss Universe Vietnam 2015

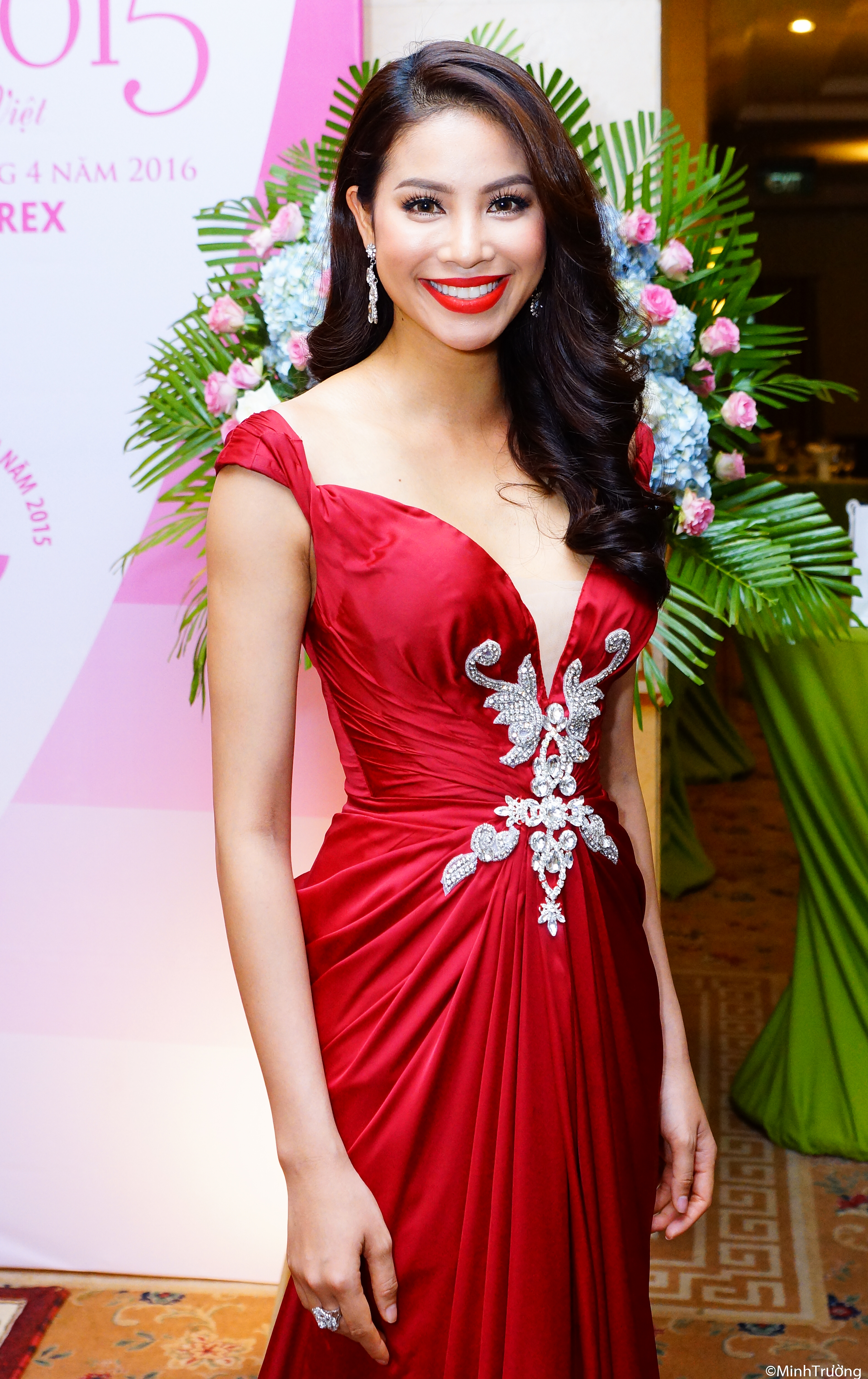
- Born: Phạm Thị Hương; 4 September 1991 (age 35); Thủy Nguyên, Hải Phòng, Vietnam
- Height: 1.74 m (5 ft 8 1/2 in)
- Spouse: Married
- Children: 2
- Beauty pageant titleholder
- Title: 1st Runner-up of Miss Sport World 2014; Miss Universe Vietnam 2015
- Hair color: Brown
- Eye color: Brown
- Major competitions: Miss Vietnam 2014 (Top 10); Miss Universe Vietnam 2015 (Winner); Miss Universe 2015 (Unplaced)

Phạm Thị Hương (born 4 September 1991), better known as Phạm Hương is a Vietnamese model, college lecturer and beauty pageant titleholder who was crowned as Miss Universe Vietnam 2015 on October 3, 2015, at Crown Convention Center, Nha Trang City, Vietnam. She represented Vietnam at Miss Universe 2015 but was unplaced.

== Personal life ==
Phạm Hương was born on September 4, 1991, in Haiphong, Vietnam. She moved to Hanoi in 2010 to study and graduated as an International Administration and Marketing Major from Vietnam University of Commerce. Besides being a fashion model, she is also a lecturer at Saigon College of Arts, Culture and Tourism in Ho Chi Minh City, Vietnam. Previously, she participated in Vietnam's Next Top Model 2010, where she finished in eighth place. Later, she was named the first runner-up at the 2014 Miss World Sport, a beauty pageant in the framework of the 2014 Winter Olympics in Sochi, Russia, and made the cut into top 10 of Miss Vietnam 2014.

== Career ==
=== 2010: Modelling and big turn at 24 ===
Previously, she participated in Vietnam's Next Top Model 2010, where she became the eighth eliminated. Later, she was named the first runner-up at the 2014 Miss World Sport, a beauty pageant in the framework of the 2014 Winter Olympics in Sochi, Russia. In the same year, she also made the cut into the top 10 of Miss Vietnam 2014. She competed in F-Idol 2011 (winner), Ngoi Sao Nguoi Mau Ngay Mai 2012 (Top 5). After signing a contract with VC Modeling Agency, she continued to perform in fashion shows such as: Thoi Trang va Nhan Vat (Fashion and Characters), Duyen Dang Viet Nam (Charming Vietnam), Ky Niem 18 nam cua NTK Hoang Hai (Fashion designer Hoang Hai's 18 year anniversary), Tap Le Thoi Trang tai Ha Noi, etc.

In 2013, she moved to Ho Chi Minh City and competed in Nu Hoang Trang Suc Viet Nam 2013 (Top 5), Miss World Sport (1st runner up, Russia), and Miss Viet Nam 2014 (Top 10) as well as becoming college lecturer at Sai Gon Culture Arts and Tourism College at the age of 23.

At the age of 24, she competed in Miss Universe Vietnam 2015 and was crowned by Miss Universe Vietnam 2008 Nguyễn Thùy Lâm. After the pageant, famous French fashion consultant Ines Ligron posted a compliment on her social media for Pham Huong.

=== 2015: Miss Universe (Las Vegas, USA) ===
In early December 2015, she represented Vietnam at Miss Universe which was held in Las Vegas, USA. She made it to the Top 15 Favorite Contestants through audience votes. Despite her good performance and preparation, she didn't make it to the Top 15. She was named "Hoa Hau Quoc Dan" (Vietnam National Miss) for her effort in promoting Vietnam to everyone around the globe. The Richest picked Pham Huong for Top 50 World's Most Beautiful Women.

After the pageant, she was nominated for We Choice Awards as one of the Top 10 Inspiration Characters which was voted by the audience. She joined the TV show Bua Trua Vui Ve and shared her journey.

=== 2016: Coach of The Face Vietnam ===
January 22, 2016, at the auction of Gala Tu Thien, she brought a portrait of herself and 79 signatures of 79 contestants of Miss Universe 2015 as contribution for the charity foundation after the auction.

At the end of 2014, she became a coach for The Face Vietnam 1st season, alongside Ho Ngoc Ha (famous singer and model from Vietnam) and Tran a Ngoc Lan Khue (Top 11 Miss World 2015). In the finals, her member Do Tran Khanh Ngan was a runner-up.

=== 2017: Consultant of Toi La Hoa Hau Hoan Vu Viet Nam and coach of The Look Viet Nam ===
On April 3, 2017, she released a song Va Lang Nghe Minh which was composed by Chau Dang Khoa as a tribute to her fans. She shared later that she had no intention of switching to singing and wanted to learn more.

At the end of April, she was the consultant of Futurista - Nguoi Ke Vi Tuong Lai which was a part of the TV show Toi La Hoa Hau Hoan Vu Viet Nam in 5 big cities.

On September 30, she was a judge alongside the main judge in the TV show Toi La Hoa Hau Hoan Vu Viet Nam during the first season.

Besides this, she was a coach of The Look Vietnam alongside Nguyen Minh Tu and Nguyen Cao Ky Duyen. On October 11, her team member Ngo Phuong Linh won a contract with the main sponsor of The Look Vietnam.

=== 2018: Fashion Designer ===
On January 6, she appeared in the finals of the Miss Universe Vietnam 2017 pageant in Nha Trang, where she won the pageant. She took a final walk before crowning Miss Universe Vietnam H'Hen Niê.

On May 11, she released her first fashion collection and held a fashion show themed "Girl Boss."

Awards and achievements
Preceded by (Bulgaria) Evgénia Draganova	1st Runner-up - Miss Sport World; 2014	Succeeded by (Lebanon) Yara Ohannessian
Preceded by Nguyễn Thùy Lâm	Miss Cosmo Vietnam; 2015	Succeeded by H'Hen Niê
Preceded by Trương Thị May	Miss Universe Vietnam; 2015	Succeeded by Đặng Thị Lệ Hằng
