= Trần Thị Hương Giang =

Vietnamese beauty pageant

beauty queen Hương Giang
- Born: Trần Thị Hương Giang; 1987 (age 38–39); Hải Dương, Vietnam
- Beauty pageant titleholder
- Title: Miss Hải Dương 2006; 2nd Runner Up Miss Vietnam Global 2009 (in USA); Miss Grand Slam Asia 2009
- Hair color: black
- Eye color: brown
- Major competitions: Miss Vietnam 2004 (Unplaced); Miss Women Vietnam (by photo) 2005 (Top 10); Miss Vietnam 2006 (Top 10); Miss Asia 2007 (unplaced); Miss Vietnam Global 2009 in USA (2nd runner-up); Miss World 2009 (Top 16); Miss Grand Slam 2009 (6th place/ Miss Grand Slam Asia)

Trần Thị Hương Giang (born 14 January 1987 in Hải Dương) is a Vietnamese model and beauty pageant titleholder. She was crowned Miss Hai Duong 2006 and the 2nd Runner Up for Miss Vietnam Global 2009 in the US. Hương Giang was the official representative of Vietnam in the Miss World 2009 pageant in South Africa where she placed in the Top 16. In 2010, website GlobalBeauties named her Miss Grand Slam Asia 2009.

== Background ==
Giang studied journalism at a university and is a professional model. She was the second runner-up of Miss Global Vietnam 2009, finalist top 10 in Miss Vietnam 2006, and winner of Miss Hai Duong 2006.

Awards and achievements
Preceded by Dương Trương Thiên Lý	Miss World Vietnam; 2009	Succeeded by Nguyễn Ngọc Kiều Khanh
