= Hoàng Khánh Ngọc =

Vietnamese model (born 1985)

- Born: Hoàng Khánh Ngọc; 17 March 1985 (age 41); Hải Dương, Vietnam
- Height: 1.81 m (5 ft 11 1/2 in)
- Beauty pageant titleholder
- Hair color: black
- Eye color: brown
- Major competitions: Miss Universe 2004 (Unplaced); Miss Universe Vietnam 2008 (Top 10)

Hoàng Khánh Ngọc (born 17 March 1985 in Hải Dương) is a Vietnamese model and beauty pageant titleholder who was the gold medal winner of Vietnam Super Model Award 2004 and represented Vietnam in Miss Universe 2004. She attended Kent International College and is now living in Sydney, Australia.

Preceded by None	Vietnam's representative at Miss Universe; 2004	Succeeded by Phạm Thu Hằng
