= Truong Tri Truc Diem =

Vietnamese model (born 1987)

Trương Tri Trúc Diễm
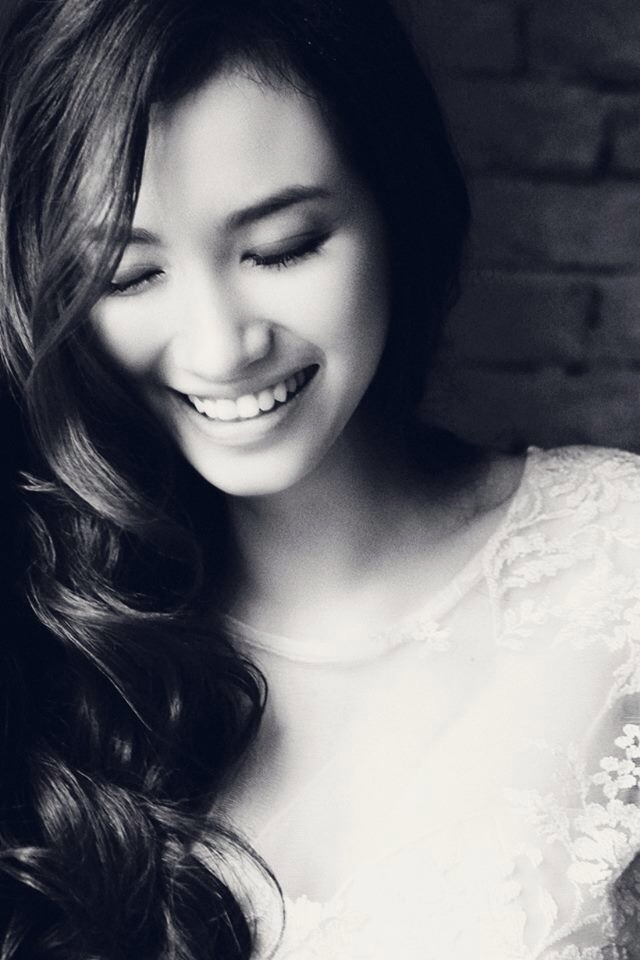
- Self-portrait photograph
- Born: May 24, 1987 (age 39); Ho Chi Minh City, Vietnam
- Education: PSB Academy, Singapore
- Height: 172 cm (5 ft 8 in)
- Spouse: John Từ (m. 2015; div. 2021)
- Beauty pageant titleholder
- Title: 1st Runner-up of Miss Vietnam Photogenic 2005
- Major competitions: Miss Vietnam Photogenic 2005 (1st Runner-up); Miss Earth 2007 (Unplaced); Miss International 2011 (Top 15)

Truong Tri Truc Diem (Vietnamese name: Trương Tri Trúc Diễm) (born May 24, 1987 in Ho Chi Minh City) is a Vietnamese model, actress, goodwill ambassador and beauty pageant titleholder who was first runner-up of Miss Vietnam Photogenic 2005 pageant. She graduated from PSB Academy of Singapore with a Business Administration degree. In 2006, she became the face and spokesperson for many international brands and products in Vietnam and Asia, giving a boost for her modelling career as she was chosen most young and successful model of 2006. Truc Diem speaks Vietnamese, English, Korean and is studying Chinese. In 2007 she entered Miss Earth and won the title Miss Fashion, also in the same year Global beauties voted her top 50 most beautiful women on earth. She also entered Top 15 semi-finalist in Miss International 2011 in China.

Awards and achievements
| Preceded by Vũ Nguyễn Hà Anh | Miss Earth Vietnam; 2007 | Succeeded by Lưu Thị Diễm Hương |
| Preceded by Chung Thục Quyên | Miss International Vietnam; 2011 | Succeeded by Lô Thị Hương Trâm |
