= Phạm Thu Hằng =

Vietnamese model (born 1984)

- Born: Phạm Thu Hằng; 1984 (age 41–42); Hanoi, Vietnam
- Height: 1.77 m (5 ft 10 in)
- Beauty pageant titleholder
- Title: Miss Hanoi-Vietnam 2005
- Hair color: black
- Eye color: black
- Major competitions: Miss Hanoi-Vietnam 2005 (Winner); Miss Universe 2005 (Unplaced)

Phạm Thu Hằng (born 1984 in Hanoi, Vietnam) is a Vietnamese model and beauty pageant titleholder who won Miss Hanoi-Vietnam 2005 (Miss Vietnam Universe 2005).

Preceded by Hoàng Khánh Ngọc	Vietnam's representative at Miss Universe; 2005	Succeeded by Nguyễn Thùy Lâm
