= Vũ Hoàng My =

Vietnamese beauty queen, athlete, and activist

- Born: 13 November 1988 (age 38); Đồng Nai Province, Vietnam
- Education: RMIT International University (2011), Multimedia Design; New York Film Academy, U.S., BFA in Filmmaking
- Height: 1.73 m (5 ft 8 in)
- Beauty pageant titleholder
- Title: 1st Runner-up of Miss Vietnam 2010
- Hair color: Dark brown
- Eye color: Brown
- Major competitions: Miss Vietnam 2010 (1st Runner-up); Miss Universe 2011 (Unplaced); Miss World 2012 (Unplaced)

Vũ Thị Hoàng My (born 13 November 1988) is a Vietnamese athlete, humanitarian activist, director and beauty pageant titleholder. She is the first Vietnamese beauty pageant titleholder to be chosen to represent the 2 biggest beauty pageants in the world: Miss Universe 2011 and Miss World 2012. My is considered an icon of healthy lifestyle, and has had success as a model, host, copywriter, and dancer. She consults for beauty pageants, sports projects, NGO organisations and film projects. As a filmmaker, she produces both fiction and documentary features. She speaks Vietnamese and English fluently. My was one of the 7 main judges of the Miss Universe Vietnam 2017 and 2022.

== Early life and family ==
Hoàng My, which translates in English to "Golden Beauty", was born into a family of headmasters, educators, architects and agriculturalists. Her early life was spent at Đồng Nai Province in southeastern Vietnam, where foreign investment in the primary and secondary sectors of the economy has been heavy since the Đổi Mới economic policy of the late 1980s. As a high school student, she sat as a representative on social committees and the governing student body at Thống Nhất A High School. She was a multimedia design student at RMIT University (2011), Saigon South Campus and a BFA in filmmaking student at New York Film Academy, Universal Studio, LA, USA.

== Pageantry ==
=== Miss Vietnam 2010 ===
In the first year she participated, Vu Hoang My became the first runner-up of Miss Vietnam 2010, answering the question about Halong Bay:

- Final Question: What do you know about Halong Bay, where the Miss Vietnam Pageant is happening?
- Answer: Halong Bay is the intersection of the earth, the sky and the ocean. It has an imposing beauty and its impression can touch our hearts easily. Halong Bay was voted one of the New7Wonders of Nature. To me, after several years, now that I have come back, Halong Bay makes me feel like I am seeing my old soulmate.

=== Miss Universe 2011 ===
Vũ Hoàng My was selected by Unicorp - the franchise holder - to represent Vietnam in the Miss Universe 2011 competition in São Paulo, Brazil in August and September 2011. In the opinion of some critics, she was one of the best Vietnamese representatives ever to participate in the international beauty pageant circuit.

=== Miss World 2012 ===
Hoang My was recommended by Elite Vietnam - the franchise holder - to be the official representative of Vietnam at Miss World 2012 in Ordos, Inner Mongolia, China. She brought a strong image of Vietnam and impressed her fans and followers by her clips:

- Vu Hoang My - Interview at Miss World
- Vu Hoang My - Miss World 2012 - PROFILE - Vietnam
- Vu Hoang My - Miss World 2012 - BEAUTY WITH A PURPOSE
- Vu Hoang My - MY BEAUTIFUL COUNTRY

During the Miss World 2012 competition, Hoang My consistently ranked among the top three contestants in the Miss Media category and garnered significant support from her fans. She received 43,321 likes on the official ‘Miss World - Vietnam’[1] Facebook Fan Page over the course of one month.

Hoang My was in top beach beauty of Miss World 2012.

== Experience ==
- 2022 - Actress - Toa Do Hanh Phuc TV series
- 2022 - Gameshow Domination Vietnam - Winner with Tran Viet Bao Hoang
- 2022 - One of the 7 main judges of the Miss Universe Vietnam 2022
- 2021 - Vietnam Why Not Reality Show - Winner Team Khan Ran
- 2021 - Frontline against Covid-19 epidemic - Volunteer
- 2017 - One of the 7 main judges of the Miss Universe Vietnam 2017
- 01/2016–present - Producer, director of a documentary.
- 10/2015 - Partnership Director of Miss Universe Vietnam 2015
- 09/2015 - Ambassador of Vietnam Mountain Marathon 2015
- 05/2015 - Ambassador of VNG Ironman 70.3 Vietnam 2015
- 01/2014 - BFA in Filmmaking - New York Film Academy - Scholarship.
- 11/2013 - Interviewing stars and director of '47 Ronin' - Tokyo, Japan.
- 01/2013 - 1 Year Acting For Film Attending - New York Film Academy, LA - scholarship.
- 09/2012 - Co-host of reality show. Martin Yan - Taste Of Vietnam.
- 05/2012 - Attending 65th Cannes Film Festival in France.
- 04/2012 - Interviewing Super Stars and Director of the blockbuster, The Avengers in 2012 in Hollywood.
- 03/2012 - Dancing With The Stars Vietnam 2012.
- 08/2012 - Miss World 2012 in Ordos, Inner Mongolia, China.
- 08/2011 - Miss Universe 2011 in São Paulo, Brazil.
- 08/2010 - Miss Vietnam 2010 in Halong Bay, Vietnam.

== Humanitarian work and social activities ==
Vu Hoang My has exhibited passion to improve the education for children in Vietnam. She is affiliated with various charities, including:

- Tiền Phong Study Encouragement Fund (2010).
- Endorsing and supporting scholarship funds for underprivileged children through Nguyễn Thượng Hiền secondary school in her hometown, Đồng Nai. (2010).
- Fundraiser for Quảng Bình flood victims in 2010.
- Universe Ambassador Operation Smile Vietnam that helps children with cleft lips and palate in Vietnam (2011-now)
- Founder of Run For Knowledge - to build libraries for children (2012-now)
- Ambassador of 'Case For Girls' Campaign' of OneVietnam Organization - to build a network of Vietnamese living all over the world and exposing them to the problems, and solutions, facing the Vietnamese community at home and abroad.

Awards and achievements
Preceded by Victoria Phạm Thuý Vy	Miss World Vietnam; 2012	Succeeded by Lại Hương Thảo
Preceded by Võ Hoàng Yến	Miss Universe Vietnam; 2011	Succeeded by Lưu Thị Diễm Hương
Preceded by Phan Hoàng Minh Thư	1st Runner Up Miss Vietnam; 2010	Succeeded by Dương Tú Anh
