= Lưu Thị Diễm Hương =

Vietnamese beauty pageant winner

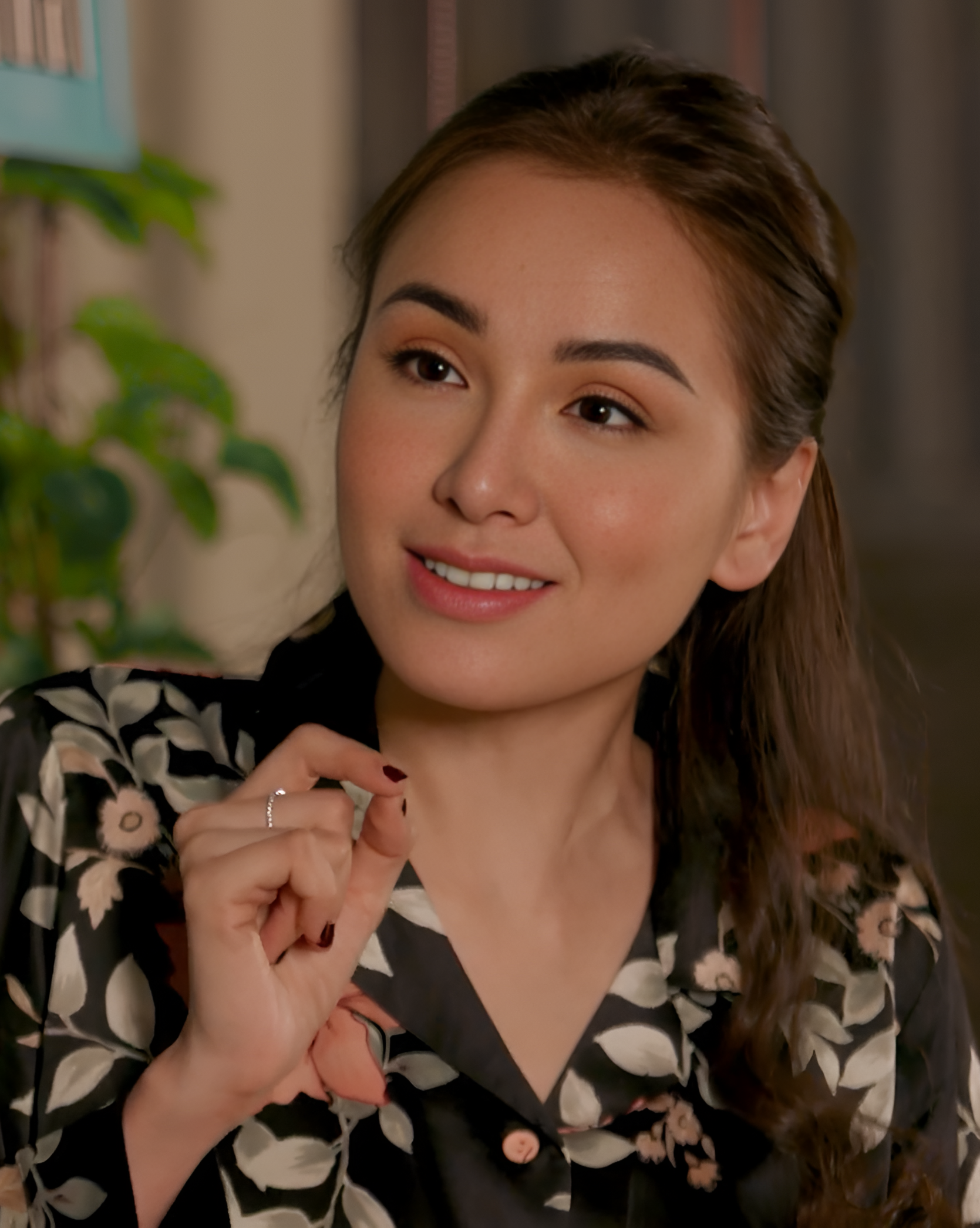
- Born: Lưu Thị Diễm Hương; August 30, 1990 (age 36); Ho Chi Minh City, Vietnam
- Height: 1.75 m (5 ft 9 in)
- Spouses: Đinh Trường Chinh (m. 2011; div. 2014) Quang Huy (m. 2015; div. 2020)
- Children: 1
- Beauty pageant titleholder
- Title: Miss Vietnam World 2010
- Hair color: Black
- Eye color: Black
- Major competitions: Miss Vietnam World 2010 (Winner); Miss Earth 2010 (Top 14); Miss Universe 2012 (Unplaced)
- Website: http://www.hoahaudiemhuong.com/

Lưu Thị Diễm Hương is a Vietnamese model and beauty pageant titleholder who won the title of Miss Vietnam World 2010. Diễm Hương was born on August 30, 1990, in Ho Chi Minh City, Vietnam. Diễm Hương did not go to Miss World 2010 but she was sent to represent Vietnam in the Miss Earth 2010 pageant in Nha Trang, Vietnam.

== Personal life ==
It was revealed in 2014 that she married in 2011, before competing in Miss Universe 2012. Her old husband, Đinh Trường Chinh had complaint to divorce. She became the first Vietnam's representative at Miss Universe when married.

Awards and achievements
Preceded by Ngô Phương Lan	Miss Vietnam World; 2010	Succeeded by None
Preceded by Trương Tri Trúc Diễm	Miss Earth Vietnam; 2010	Succeeded by Phan Thị Mơ
Preceded by Vũ Thị Hoàng My	Miss Universe Vietnam; 2012	Succeeded by Trương Thị May
