= Miss Universe Vietnam 2008 =

1st Miss Universe Vietnam pageant

- Date: May 31, 2008
- Presenters: Anh Quân
- Venue: Vinpearl Event Hall, Nha Trang, Khánh Hoà, Vietnam
- Broadcaster: HTV9
- Entrants: 20
- Placements: 10
- Winner: Nguyễn Thùy Lâm; Thái Bình
- Congeniality: Dương Thùy Linh; Hà Nội
- Best National Costume: Bùi Thị Phương Thanh; Hồ Chí Minh City
- Photogenic: Dương Trương Thiên Lý; Đồng Tháp

Miss Universe Vietnam 2008, the 1st Miss Universe Vietnam pageant, was held on May 31, 2008, at the Vinpearl Land resort in Nha Trang, Khánh Hoà, Vietnam. 20 contestants competed for the crown. The first winner of the pageant was Nguyễn Thùy Lâm, the host delegate for the Miss Universe 2008 pageant held July 14, 2008, also in Nha Trang. She made the Top 15.
As the winner, Nguyễn Thùy Lâm represents Vietnam at Miss Universe 2008. The two runners-up represent Vietnam at Miss World 2008 (Dương Trương Thiên Lý) and Miss Universe 2009 (Võ Hoàng Yến).

== Results ==
=== Placements ===
Color keys

- Declared as the winner in an International pageant.
- Ended as Runner-up in an International pageant.
- Ended as finalist or semifinalist in an International pageant.
- Unplaced.

Final result	Contestant	International pageant	International placement
Miss Universe Vietnam 2008	23 – Nguyễn Thùy Lâm	Miss Universe 2008	Top 15
1st Runner-Up	22 – Võ Hoàng Yến	Miss Universe 2009	Unplaced
2nd Runner-Up	11 – Dương Trương Thiên Lý		
Top 5	19 – Dương Thùy Linh; 09 – Bùi Thị Phương Thanh		
Top 10	07 – Vũ Nguyễn Hà Anh; 05 – Vũ Thị Xuân Hà; 16 – Trần Diễm Trinh; 15 – Trần Phương Linh; 28 – Hoàng Khánh Ngọc		

=== Special awards ===
Special Award	Contestant
Miss Photogenic	Dương Trương Thiên Lý – Đồng Tháp
Miss Aodai	Bùi Thị Phương Thanh – Thành phố Hồ Chí Minh
Miss Beach Tourism	Trần Diễm Trinh – Tiền Giang
Miss Congeniality	Dương Thùy Linh – Hà Nội
People's Choice	Nguyễn Thùy Lâm – Thái Bình
Miss Talent	Nguyễn Thùy Lâm – Thái Bình
Best in Interview	Nguyễn Thùy Lâm – Thái Bình

== Contestants ==
20 contestants in the final.

Contestants	Age	No.	Height (ft)	Hometown
Lê Thị Kiều Thảo	1989	17	1.69 m (5 ft 7 in)	Bình Dương
Hoàng Khánh Ngọc	1985	28	1.81 m (5 ft 11 in)	Hải Dương
Đinh Thị Minh Phương	1987	27	1.67 m (5 ft 6 in)	Hà Nội
Vũ Thị Xuân Hà	1988	05	1.69 m (5 ft 7 in)	TP.HCM
Trần Phương Linh	1985	15	1.69 m (5 ft 7 in)	TP.HCM
Bùi Thị Phương Thanh	1984	09	1.70 m (5 ft 7 in)	TP.HCM
Trần Thị Phương	1989	21	1.66 m (5 ft 5 in)	TP.HCM
Võ Hoàng Yến	1988	22	1.78 m (5 ft 10 in)	TP.HCM
Nguyễn Thị Hồng Châu	1987	25	1.67 m (5 ft 6 in)	Long An
Nguyễn Thị Hồng Linh	1986	13	1.67 m (5 ft 6 in)	TP.HCM
Vũ Nguyễn Hà Anh	1982	07	1.75 m (5 ft 9 in)	Hà Nội
Nguyễn Thùy Lâm	1987	23	1.71 m (5 ft 7 in)	Thái Bình
Dương Thùy Linh	1983	19	1.68 m (5 ft 6 in)	Hà Nội
Doãn Thị Như Trang	1987	04	1.67 m (5 ft 6 in)	Hải Dương
Văn Hoa Thu Hằng	1988	20	1.65 m (5 ft 5 in)	TP.HCM
Nguyễn Thị Ngọc Bích	1985	26	1.68 m (5 ft 6 in)	Vũng Tàu
Trần Diễm Trinh	1988	16	1.72 m (5 ft 8 in)	Tiền Giang
Trần Thụy Kiều Ngân	1989	29	1.71 m (5 ft 7 in)	TP.HCM
Trần Thụy Thu Ngọc	1986	10	1.66 m (5 ft 5 in)	Long An
Dương Trương Thiên Lý	1989	11	1.66 m (5 ft 5 in)	Đồng Tháp
