= Võ Hoàng Yến =

Vietnamese actress, model and beauty pageant titleholder

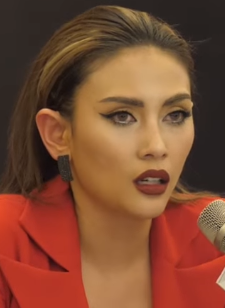
- Võ Hoàng Yến in 2018.
- Born: October 29, 1988 (age 38); Ho Chi Minh City, Vietnam
- Height: 1.81 m (5 ft 11 in)
- Beauty pageant titleholder
- Title: 1st Runner-up of Miss Universe Vietnam 2008; Miss Universe Vietnam 2009
- No. of films: A cappella (2007)
- Hair color: Black
- Eye color: Black
- Major competitions: Miss Vietnam Photogenic 2006 (Top 10); Miss Universe Vietnam 2008 (1st Runner-up); Miss Universe 2009 (Unplaced)

Võ Hoàng Yến (born October 29, 1988) is a Vietnamese actress, public speaker, model and beauty pageant titleholder. She won the Vietnam Supermodel 2008 contest and is the 1st runner-up of Miss Universe Vietnam 2008. She represented Vietnam in the Miss Universe 2009 pageant in the Bahamas.

Awards and achievements
Preceded by None	1st Runner-Up Miss Cosmo Vietnam; 2008	Succeeded by Ngô Trà My
Preceded by Nguyễn Thùy Lâm	Miss Universe Vietnam; 2009	Succeeded by Vũ Thị Hoàng My
