= Vietnam's Next Top Model season 1 =

Vietnam's Next Top Model
- Season 1

Release
- Original network: Multimedia JSC (domestically); VTV (domestically); CBS Television Distribution (internationally)
- Original release: September 30, 2010 – January 23, 2011

Season chronology
- Next → Cycle 2

Vietnam's Next Top Model, Cycle 1 is the first cycle of Top Model franchise to be produced in Vietnam by Vietnam Television and Multimedia JSC. The premiere was on September 30, 2010. In the season finale, the top 3 competed against each other on a stage.

The season filmed entirely in Ho Chi Minh City and featured 18 competitors aged between 18 and 25 and whose height was 5'5" and over.

Among with the prize were:

- A two-year contract with CA Models worth 1,000,000,000₫ (approximately $50,000)
- A one-year contract with Wilhelmina Models in New York City
- Appear on the cover of Her World magazine
- A two-year VIP Diamond Membership card at California Fitness & Yoga Center worth 300,000,000₫ (~$14,400)
- A Piaggio Vespa LX 150
- A diamond ring from Unique Jewelries worth 200,000,000₫ (~$9,600)
- A 2-year supply of Revlon worth 200,000,000₫ (~$9,600).

The winner was 20-year-old Khiếu Thị Huyền Trang from Bắc Giang.

== Host and judges ==
At the beginning of the show, Nathan Lee and Elizabeth Thủy Tiên were criticized for competing to lead the judging panel. Nathan Lee is a former international supermodel who speaks fluent Vietnamese, while female supermodel Elizabeth lived overseas for so long that her Vietnamese deteriorated. They were both replaced after two episodes. The new judging members were model Vũ Nguyễn Hà Anh, designer Huy Võ and former male model Đức Hải.

The replacement jury complained that they had no chance to pick contestants, weakening the field. The original jury reported that producers also refused to allow them choose the contestants, leading them to resign. The producers, however, announced that the change was because Nathan Lee and Elizabeth competed against each other for the host position and because there were so many conflicts between judges and producers, etc.

== Contestants ==
Contestant	Age	Height	Hometown	Finish	Place
Lại Thị Thanh Hương	18	1.68 m (5 ft 6 in)	Hải Phòng	Episode 4	15-14
Trần Lê Hoài Thương	22	1.75 m (5 ft 9 in)	TP.HCM	Episode 4	15-14
Bùi Thị Thu Thùy	19	1.73 m (5 ft 8 in)	Hà Nội	Episode 5	13
Nguyễn Thanh Hằng	18	1.68 m (5 ft 6 in)	Hà Nội	Episode 6	12
Bùi Thị Hoàng Oanh	20	1.70 m (5 ft 7 in)	Bà Rịa–Vũng Tàu	Episode 7	11
Nguyễn Diệp Anh	21	1.67 m (5 ft 5 1/2 in)	Hà Nội	Episode 8	10
Hồ Mỹ Phương	21	1.66 m (5 ft 5 1/2 in)	Thừa Thiên-Huế	Episode 9	9
Phạm Thị Hương	19	1.73 m (5 ft 8 in)	Hải Phòng	Episode 10	8
Nguyễn Giáng Hương	20	1.70 m (5 ft 7 in)	Phú Thọ	Episode 11	7
Đàm Thu Trang	21	1.73 m (5 ft 8 in)	Lạng Sơn	Episode 12	6
Trần Thị Thu Hiền	21	1.72 m (5 ft 7 1/2 in)	Vĩnh Phúc	Episode 13	5
Đỗ Thị Thanh Hoa	20	1.68 m (5 ft 6 in)	Hà Nội	Episode 14	4
Nguyễn Thu Thủy	20	1.71 m (5 ft 7 1/2 in)	Hà Nội	Episode 16	3
Nguyễn Thị Tuyết Lan	20	1.75 m (5 ft 9 in)	TP.HCM	Episode 16	2
Khiếu Thị Huyền Trang	20	1.78 m (5 ft 10 in)	Bắc Giang	Episode 16	1

== Episode summaries ==
=== Casting weeks ===
Air date: September 30 & October 7, 2010

Contestants gathered at White Palace for casting. Every girl had to walk on a long runway and showed her signature poses. 60 made it to the next round, before being further cut to 24 and then 14. The final fourteen sat down with judges to discuss their strengths and weakness. Nine girls advanced to the final round simultaneously after they knew the first five girls had been eliminated.

One week later, the show moved to Hanoi. Like the previous casting format, every contestant had to express herself in front of a crowd. Another nine girls were added from their photos to make a field of 18.

- Featured photographer: Kevin Freeman
- Judges: Hoàng Ngân, Nathan Lee, Elizabeth Thủy Tiên

=== Week 3 ===
Air date: October 14, 2010

The 18 contestants arrived at International Asiana Hotel where Germ Doornbos and Le Khiet invited them to a grand party. Mỹ Phương won the first challenge with her friendly look and her elegant manners. The prize was a VIP double room that she shared with Tuyết Lan. In late afternoon, the girls met Hà Anh the new head judge. Anh asked them to perform a runway walk and gave advice. Bùi Thùy won the runway challenge and got two outfits from Candy Rox Brand. Hoài Thương also won a prize.

The week's photo shoot took place in Nguyễn Long Studio where the girls met the new second judge Huy Võ and photographer Nguyễn Long. Some were unused to shooting, so Hà Anh helped them relax through music and dance.

At the judging panel, the last main judge appeared. Thu Hiền wowed the judging with a spectacular moment of beauty that was totally in contrast to her appearance, as did Diệp Anh. Most girls did not perform well due to lack of experience. Hà Anh revealed that four girls would be sent home. In the end, only three girls left instead of four, including: Bích Trâm, Bảo Trân and Quý Dung, because judges could not unanimously eliminate either Thanh Hằng nor Giáng Hương.

- Featured photographer: Nguyễn Long
- Special guests: Mrs. Hoàng Thạch Thảo, Mr. Germ Doornbos, Mr. Lê Khiết, Jennifer Nguyen

=== Week 4 ===
Air date: October 21, 2010

The 15 remaining girls moved to their Top Model House, but there were only 12 beds. Bùi Thùy who didn't find any slot, asked Thu Hiền to share the big bed. Unexpectedly, she sat on Thu Hiền's pillow and took her beauty shot, resulting in the first catfight.

Next morning, well-known make-up artist Thanh Phước dropped by to teach make-up tips. In this week's challenge, the girls were tasked to walk on a well-known avenue. Đàm Trang received all of the prizes and shared them with Diệp Anh.

The judging panel again praised Thu Hiền and Phạm Hương for their Vietnamese and stunning faces. Thanh Hằng, Thu Thủy and Tuyết Lan showed almost the same look week after week and were criticized. Ultimately, Thanh Hương, Hoài Thương and Thu Thủy landed into the bottom three with ill performances; only Thu Thủy was saved.

- First call-out: Trần Thị Thu Hiền
- Bottom three: Lại Thị Thanh Huong, Trần Lê Hoài Thương & Nguyễn Thu Thủy
- Eliminated: Lại Thị Thanh Huong & Trần Lê Hoài Thương
- Featured photographer: Freedom
- Special guests: Thanh Phước, Lê Quốc Tuấn

=== Week 5 ===
Air date: October 28

Thu Thùy continued made mistakes that isolated her from the others. Diệp Anh found she couldn't take the pressure, so she talked with Bùi Thùy to deal with the problems between Bùi Thùy and the other girls. Tensions eased at Thanh Hoa's birthday party.

The week's photo shoot required girls to portray 1920s Vietnamese women living in a haunted mansion for the Halloween portfolio. Hà Anh directed the girls. Most of the photos received mixed to positive reviews, especially, Thu Thủy, Thanh Hoa, Thu Hiền and Mỹ Phương. Judges were quite impressed by the improvements of Thu Thủy and Thanh Hoa whose weak expressions led to expectations that they wouldn't last. Bùi Thùy was sent home although the judges felt that she had a unique look.

- First call-out: Thu Thủy
- Bottom two: Bùi Thùy & Hương Phạm
- Eliminated: Bùi Thùy
- Featured photographer: Kevin German
- Special guests: Miss Mint, Al Morgan, Randy Dobson, Annie Nguyen

=== Week 6 ===
Air date: November 4, 2010

Hà Anh informed twelve girls that they would receive makeovers. At night, Hà Anh made a surprise visit to the house. She joined hands with the contestants to cook for dinner and shared runway tips. Thanh Hoa won the challenge and got high-heeled shoes from Hà Anh's collection. The next morning, they went to Đầm Sen Park and did a runway walk with bulldogs. Boma and Đức Hải were impressed by how Thu Thủy walked and dealt with the dogs. As the winner, Thu Thủy shared the prizes randomly with Phạm Hương. Thu Thủy opened the show with a Bebe Pham fashion show that featured many Vietnamese Top Models.

The weekly photo shoot required models to pose as leaping athletes, while portraying sports listed below:

Contestant	Artistic sport
Diệp Anh	Sport aerobics
Thanh Hằng	Badminton
Thu Hiền	Taekwondo
Thanh Hoa	Rhythmic gymnastics
Giáng Hương	Long jump
Phạm Hương	Muay Thai
Tuyết Lan	Football
Hoàng Oanh	High jump
Mỹ Phương	Skipping rope
Thu Thủy	Athletics
Huyền Trang	Kickboxing
Thu Trang	Floor exercise

At panel, Boma, Randy Dobson and David Dougan sat in as guest judges. Thanh Hoa and Giáng Hương received universal praise and an offer from Randy, the President of California Center and of CA Models. The girls would feature on the main site of California Club and will a worldwide ad for one month. Thanh Hằng was found boring and landed her in the bottom two with 12-year-old-child look-alike Hoàng Oanh. At the end, Thanh Hằng was out.

- First call-out: Thanh Hoa
- Bottom two: Thanh Hằng & Hoàng Oanh
- Eliminated: Thanh Hằng
- Featured photographer: David Dougan
- Special guests: Boma Sandra, Randy Dobson

=== Week 7 ===
Air date: November 11, 2010

Editors from Her World magazine talked with contestants about their strengths and weaknesses prior to a shopping challenge at Vincom Center. Mỹ Phương won the reward challenge, but the other girls disagreed because her outfit was too similar to the challenge judge's. Next day, Hà Anh and Huy Võ took them to a nightclub. They met rocker Phạm Anh Khoa who appeared in the week's photo shoot. Thu Hiền won the week. Mỹ Phương was praised as a rock princess. Hoàng Oanh was sent home.

- First call-out: Thu Hiền
- Bottom three: Giáng Hương, Thu Thủy & Hoàng Oanh
- Eliminated: Hoàng Oanh
- Featured photographer: Kevin German
- Featured designs: Hà Trương
- Special guests: Editors from Her World (Nguyễn Hồng Hạnh, Hà Mi, Kim Thuận, Thùy Linh), Donia Medini, Phạm Anh Khoa, Hà Trương

=== Week 8 ===
Air date: November 18, 2010

Mrs. Thiên Hương came to their house and shared her experiences. Diệp Anh won the close talk. She got mad at Huyền Trang and stated that she would leave the unfair competition, but was prevented. In the other challenge, the girls were supposedly at a Press Conference and received some unexpected questions. Thu Hiền won this challenge. She had a chance to be at the red carpet of Jimmy Choo New Brand Launch in Vietnam. She picked Tuyết Lan up to go accompany her.

At the photo shoot, the girls were required to portray 1940s ladies living in Saigon. During deliberation, Thanh Hoa and Đàm Trang wowed judges because they knew how to work with their not too perfect bodies and faces. Others didn't know, especially Phạm Hương. That landed her into the bottom two with Diệp Anh. Judges felt Diệp Anh should be a choreographer rather than be a model and sent her home.

- First call-out: Đàm Trang
- Bottom two: Diệp Anh & Phạm Hương
- Eliminated: Diep Anh
- Featured photographer: David Dougan
- Featured designs: Hà Khúc Nhật Minh, Diệu Anh
- Special guests: editors from Her World Magazine (Trần Nguyễn Thiên Hương, Hoàng Nguyên Vũ, Huyền Ngọc), Dolev "Sunshine" Sadan

=== Week 9 ===
Air date: November 25, 2010

Boma stopped by for a while, picked 3 girls up alongside Thu Thủy and Phạm Hương for a Bebe Fashion Show. After the show, they went home with hopes that they would be celebrated. Tensions rose when they were ignored. Next day, all girls were invited for dinner with guests. Hà Anh revealed the most important person of the day was Đàm Vinh Hưng who surprised the girls. At the end of the night, they walked for Đỗ Mạnh Cường as a runway challenge. Thu Hiền won again and shared a set of Unique Diamond Jewelry with Thu Thủy.

At the photo shoot they were frightened by a python, which was in the pictures with them.

At judging panel, the judges were displeased by Mỹ Phương's single facial expression; of Thu Hiền's instability and of Thu Thủy's inability to transfer emotion and personality to a photo. Huyền Trang once again made judges feel like she didn't know her advantages, but the photo was quite good. As a result, Mỹ Phương packed her bags and went home over her lack of versatility.

- First call-out: NguyễnGiáng Hương
- Bottom two: Đỗ Thị Thanh Hoa & Hồ Mỹ Phương
- Eliminated: Hồ Mỹ Phương
- Featured photographer: Freedom
- Featured designs: Đỗ Mạnh Cường
- Special guests: Mr. Bùi Tân Xuân, designer Đỗ Mạnh Cường, Đàm Vĩnh Hưng

=== Week 10 ===
Air date: December 2, 2010

The girls shoot their first Unique commercial.

- First call-out: Nguyễn Thu Thủy
- Bottom two:Đỗ Thị Thanh Hoa & Hương Phạm
- Eliminated: Hương Phạm
- Featured director:
- Featured designs:
- Special guests: Thanh Loan, Minh Tiệp, Charlie Nguyễn

=== Week 11 ===
Air date: December 9, 2010

The bus took girls to Mũi Né, Phan Thiết where they received tips for walking on sand like a Chăm Lady. Prior to the week's challenge, contestants joined in a fashion show for local fisherman. Huyền Trang officially won the reward and Thu Hiền was chosen to join the winner's reward for her attempt.

The photo shoot of the week was taken on a dune. The girls were tasked to act as soft as the dress in Gone With The Wind. Giáng Hương, Huyền Trang and Đàm Trang did not do well. At the end, Giáng Hương was eliminated. Đàm Trang again survived.

- First call-out: Nguyễn Thị Tuyết Lan
- Bottom two: Đàm Thu Trang & Nguyễn Giáng Hương
- Eliminated: Nguyễn Giáng Hương
- Featured photographer: Kevin German
- Featured designs:
- Special guests: Mr. Nguyễn Đình, Mrs. Kim Tuyến

=== Week 12 ===
Air date: December 16, 2010

Huy Võ dropped by the house, bringing chè to have with the girls. Later, Hà Anh came in and helped share thoughts on life. Thanh Hoa felt so much pressure that she desired to leave the competition. The decision was not yet made. Next day, Huy Võ revealed that the photo shoot's theme was flying fairy, which exhausted the girls. In the end, Tuyết Lan, Thu Hiền and Đàm Trang landed to bottom three for the first time. Tuyết Lan was a perfect and passionate model with beauty and personality, but her health did not allow her to perform; Thu Hiền was like Tuyết Lan, but she had a rough attitude and could not focus and Đàm Trang used the same expression from week to week. Only Thu Trang was eliminated.

- First call-out: Đỗ Thị Thanh Hoa
- Bottom three: Nguyễn Thị Tuyết Lan, Trần Thị Thu Hiền & Đàm Thu Trang
- Eliminated: Đàm Thu Trang
- Featured photographer: David Dougan
- Featured designs:
- Special guests: Randy Dobson, Miss Mint & Al Morgan, Đức Tiến

=== Week 13 ===
Air date: December 23, 2010

The show began with girls going to audition for fashion shows. For the photo shoot of the week, they did another commercial shot for Piaggio.

Contestant	Portrayed
Thanh Hoa	twin sisters (with Thu Thủy as her twin sister)
Huyền Trang	agreeable dude (with Tuyết Lan as a sweet girl)
Thu Hiền	positive mom (with Huyền Trang as her funky daughter)
Tuyết Lan	Ugly Betty (with Thanh Hoa as a mean girl)
Thu Thủy	celebrity (with Thu Hiền as a waiter)

- First call-out: Khiếu Thị Huyền Trang
- Bottom two: Đỗ Thị Thanh Hoa & Trần Thị Thu Hiền
- Eliminated: Trần Thị Thu Hiền
- Featured photographer: David Dougan

=== Week 14 ===
Air date: January 9, 2011

- First call-out: Khiếu Thị Huyền Trang
- Bottom two: Nguyễn Thị Tuyết Lan & Đỗ Thị Thanh Hoa
- Eliminated: Thị Thanh Hoa
- Featured photographer: David Dougan

=== Week 15 ===
Air date: January 16, 2011

This is the recap episode.

=== Week 16 ===
Air date: January 23, 2011

After five months, the three remaining contestants were Khieu Thi Huyen Trang, Nguyen Thi Tuyet Lan and Nguyen Thu Thuy. The final week was broadcast live on 23 January from InterContinental Asiana Saigon. The girls walk in the designs of designer Do Manh Cuong. This is the meeting of Top 8 and many famous singers. The show representative said that the final show would involve Vietnam fashion industry celebrities.

- Final 3: Khiếu Thị Huyền Trang, Nguyễn Thị Tuyết Lan & Nguyễn Thu Thủy
- Eliminated: Nguyễn Thu Thủy
- Final 2: Khiếu Thị Huyền Trang & Nguyễn Thị Tuyết Lan
- Vietnam's Next Top Model 2010: Khiếu Thị Huyền Trang

=== Call-out order ===
Order	Episodes													
Order	3	4	5	6	7	8	9	10	11	12	13	14	16	
1	Hiền	Hiền	Thủy N.	Hoa	Hiền	Trang Đ.	Hương N.	Thủy N.	Lan	Hoa	Trang K.	Trang K.	Trang K.	Trang K.
2	Anh	Hương P.	Hoa	Trang Đ.	Lan	Lan	Trang K.	Hiền	Hiền	Thủy N.	Thủy N.	Thủy N.	Lan	Lan
3	Hương L.	Oanh	Oanh	Hương N.	Hoa	Hoa	Thủy N.	Trang K.	Thủy N.	Trang K.	Lan	Lan	Thủy N.	
4	Thương	Phương	Phương	Phương	Phương	Hương N.	Lan	Trang Đ.	Hoa	Hiền	Hoa	Hoa		
5	Hương P.	Thùy B.	Hằng	Trang K.	Trang Đ.	Phương	Hương P.	Lan	Trang K.	Lan	Hiền			
6	Phương	Hằng	Trang K.	Hương P.	Trang K.	Trang K.	Hiền	Hương N.	Trang Đ.	Trang Đ.				
7	Hoa	Hoa	Hiền	Anh	Anh	Thủy N.	Trang Đ.	Hoa	Hương N.					
8	Trang Đ.	Lan	Hương N.	Hiền	Hương P.	Hiền	Hoa	Hương P.						
9	Thủy N.	Trang Đ.	Lan	Thủy N.	Hương N.	Hương P.	Phương							
10	Lan	Trang K.	Anh	Lan	Thủy N.	Anh								
11	Thùy B.	Hương N.	Trang Đ.	Oanh	Oanh									
12	Hằng	Anh	Hương P.	Hằng										
13	Hương N.	Thủy N.	Thùy B.											
14	Oanh	Hương L. Thương												
15	Trang K.	Hương L. Thương												

Thí sinh chiến thắng
Thí sinh bị loại

=== Average call-out order ===
Rank by average	Place	Model	Call-out total	Number of call-outs	Call-out average
1	5	Hiền	45	11	4.09
2	4	Hoa	51	12	4.25
3	1	Trang K.	66	14	4.71
4	2	Lan	66	14	4.71
5	3	Thủy N.	65	13	5.00
6	9	Phương	36	7	5.14
7	6	Trang Đ.	55	10	5.50
8	7	Hương N.	62	9	6.89
9	8	Hương P.	58	8	7.25
10	10	Anh	48	6	8.00
11	11	Oanh	42	5	8.40
12	14-15	Hương L.	17	2	8.50
13	12	Hằng	35	4	8.75
14	14-15	Thương	14	2	9.50
15	13	Bùi T.	29	3	9.67

=== Photo Shoot Guide ===
- Episode 1 & 2 Photo Shoots: Promo Shots (Casting)
- Episode 3 Photo Shoot: Posing in the rain
- Episode 4 Photo Shoot: Beauty Shot
- Episode 5 Photo Shoot: Vietnamese 1920s Halloween
- Episode 6 Photo Shoot: Jumping in sporty clothes for California Fitness & Yoga Center
- Episode 7 Photo Shoot: Rock Your Fashion
- Episode 8 Photo Shoot: Back to the 1940s
- Episode 9 Photo Shoot: Extreme Beauty Shot with a Python
- Episode 10 Commercial: Unique Diamond
- Episode 11 Photo Shoot: Flowing in Mũi Né
- Episode 12 Photo Shoot: Fairy's Flying
- Episode 13 Commercial: Vespa LX 150 Commercial and Print Ad
- Episode 14 Photo Shoot: The Ice Queen
- Episode 16 Photo Shoots: Her World Magazine Cover; Diva Shots

== Judges ==
=== Casting ===
- Nathan Lee, Former Male Model / FTV Magazine Manager & Editor
- Elizabeth Thủy Tiên, International Model
- Jennifer Nguyen, Fashion Designer

=== Main ===
- Hà Anh, Vietnamese Top Model / Head Judge
- Đức Hải, Male Model / Judge
- Jennifer Nguyen Fashion Designer / Guest Judge

== Criticism ==
Throughout the airing process, the show was criticized for unrealistic moments and catfights between contestants and for the judges' emphasis on Khiếu Thị Huyền Trang, who was crowned the winner and was the tallest contestant.

First runner-up Tuyết Lan, and other contestants, notably Đàm Thu Trang, Hoàng Oanh, Bảo Trân, Bích Trâm were discovered to have worked as professional editorial models or catwalk models prior to the contest. The producers did not disqualify them or give an official statement, while they disqualified the ethnically Khmer model Lâm Thu Hằng (Miss Vietnam 2008, Top 5) during casting.

Many Vietnamese fashionistas claimed disappointment with the show. Neither panel of judges were notable in the Vietnamese fashion industry. The panels were also criticized for including too few members. The lack of guest stars or guest judges led to boredom. Notably, Huy Võ became a judge while still studying at Fashion Institute of Design & Merchandising.

Later, it was reported that the script of the season finale was similar to that of the fourth season of Germany's Next Topmodel in 2009.
