= Nguyễn Thùy Lâm =

Miss Universe Vietnam 2008

- Born: Nguyễn Thùy Trang; September 10, 1987 (age 39); Thái Bình, Vietnam
- Height: 1.70 m (5 ft 7 in)
- Spouse: Nguyễn Anh Tuấn (m. 2010)
- Children: 2
- Beauty pageant titleholder
- Title: Miss Universe Vietnam 2008
- No. of films: Kiều nữ & đại gia (2008)
- Hair color: black
- Eye color: brown
- Major competitions: Miss Universe Vietnam 2008 (Winner); Miss Universe 2008 (Top 15)

Nguyễn Thùy Lâm (real name Nguyễn Thùy Trang, born September 10, 1987, in Thái Bình, Vietnam) is a Vietnamese singer, actress and beauty pageant titleholder who won the Miss Universe Vietnam 2008 contest on May 31, 2008.

== Miss Universe 2008 ==
At the competition held in multiple cities in Vietnam, Thuy Lam was a Top 10 finalist in the Best National Costume competition and Top 5 finalist in the Most Charming in Áo Dài (Áo Dài fashion show). In the final competition, Thuy Lam became the first Vietnamese candidate to survive the first cut in Miss Universe pageant being only one of the two Asians making the first cut along with Hiroko Mima of Japan.

== Personal life ==
She is married to Nguyễn Anh Tuấn, a businessman graduated from the US.

Awards and achievements
Preceded by None	Miss Cosmo Vietnam; 2008	Succeeded by Phạm Thị Hương
Preceded by Phạm Thu Hằng	Miss Universe Vietnam; 2008	Succeeded by Võ Hoàng Yến
