= Phú Thọ (disambiguation) =

Phú Thọ province is a province in northeastern Vietnam.

Phú Thọ may also refer to several places in Vietnam, including:

- Phú Thọ (town), a former district-level town in Phú Thọ province, dissolved in 2025 as part of the 2025 Vietnamese administrative reform
- Phú Thọ, Ho Chi Minh City, a ward of Ho Chi Minh City
- Phú Thọ, Phú Thọ, a ward of Phú Thọ province
- Phú Thọ, Đồng Tháp, a commune of Đồng Tháp Province

== See also ==
- Phú Thọ Hòa, a ward of Ho Chi Minh City
- Phú Thọ Horse Racing Ground, a horse racing place in Ho Chi Minh City
- Phú Thọ Indoor Stadium, a multi-purpose indoor arena in Ho Chi Minh City
- Phú Thọ station, a railway station in Phú Thọ province
