= Miss Vietnam 2018 =

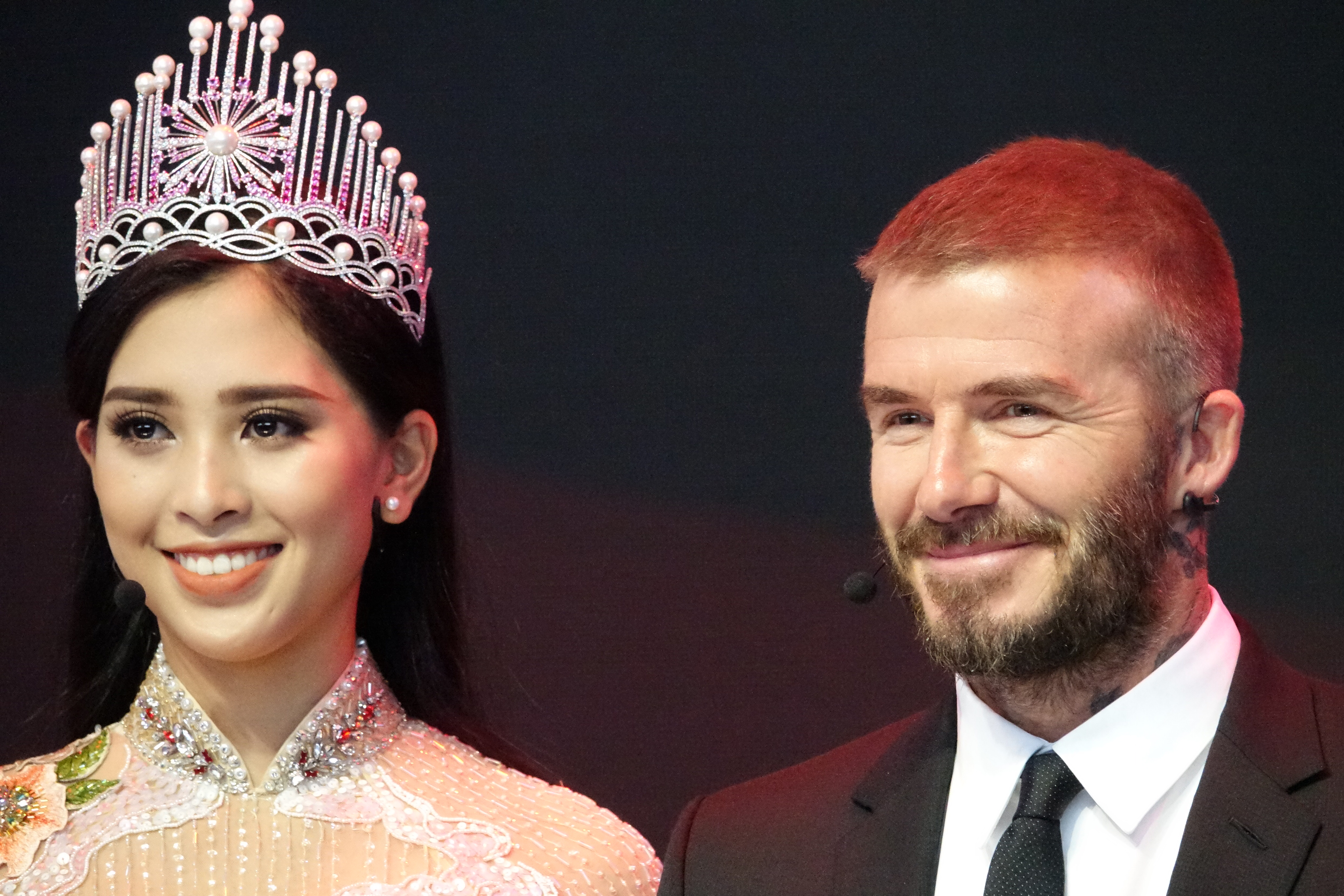
- Miss Vietnam 2018 Trần Tiểu Vy and David Beckham
- Date: September 16, 2018
- Presenters: Vũ Mạnh Cường; Tuấn Tú; Thụy Vân; Diễm Trang
- Entertainment: Hồ Ngọc Hà
- Venue: Phu Tho Indoor Stadium, District 11, Ho Chi Minh City
- Broadcaster: VTV1; VTV9
- Entrants: 44
- Placements: 25
- Winner: Trần Tiểu Vy; Quảng Nam

Miss Vietnam 2018 (Vietnamese: Hoa hậu Việt Nam 2018) was the 16th edition of the Miss Vietnam pageant. It was held on September 16, 2018 at Phu Tho Indoor Stadium, Ho Chi Minh City, Vietnam. Miss Vietnam 2016 Đỗ Mỹ Linh crowned her successor Trần Tiểu Vy at the end of the event.

The pageant crowned the Vietnam representatives to compete in the following international beauty pageants: Miss World 2018, Miss Grand International 2018, Miss Grand International 2021, Miss Intercontinental 2019 and Miss International 2018.

== Results ==
=== Placements ===
Color keys

- Declared as the winner in an International pageant.
- Ended as Runner-up in an International pageant.
- Ended as finalist or semifinalist in an International pageant.
- Unplaced.

Final result	Contestant	International pageant	International placement
Miss Vietnam 2018	Trần Tiểu Vy	Miss World 2018	Top 30
1st Runner-Up	Bùi Phương Nga	Miss Grand International 2018	Top 10
2nd Runner-Up	Nguyễn Thị Thúy An	Miss Intercontinental 2019	Unplaced
Top 5	Nguyễn Thúc Thùy Tiên §	Miss International 2018	Unplaced
Top 5	Nguyễn Thị Hồng Tuyết		
Top 10	Bùi Thị Yến Nhi; Phạm Ngọc Linh; Huỳnh Phạm Thủy Tiên; Vũ Thị Tuyết Trang; Nguyễn Hoàng Bảo Châu		
Top 15	Hà Lương Bảo Hằng; Lê Thanh Tú; Hà Thanh Vân; Phạm Ngọc Hà My; Đinh Phương Mỹ Duyên		
Top 25	Chu Thị Minh Trang; Lê Hoàng Bảo Trân; Nguyễn Thị Khánh Linh; Đặng Thị Trúc Mai; Vũ Hoàng Thảo Quyên; Vũ Hương Giang; Vũ Hoàng Thảo Vy; Lê Thị Hà Thu Chiêu; Nguyễn Hoài Phương Anh; Trần Thị Ngọc Bích		

§ Winner Beauty with a Purpose Vietnam automatically advanced to Top 5

Note: Nguyễn Thị Thúy An was not able to compete in Miss International 2018 because of unexpected health problems. For this reason, Nguyễn Thúc Thùy Tiên replaced her to become Vietnam's representative at pageant.

=== Special awards ===
Special Award	Contestant
Winner Beauty with a Purpose Vietnam	Nguyễn Thúc Thùy Tiên
Miss Áo dài	Lê Thanh Tú
Best Face	Nguyễn Thị Hồng Tuyết
Best Skin	Bùi Thị Yến Nhi
Best Interview	Phạm Ngọc Linh
Miss Tourism	Hà Lương Bảo Hằng
Miss Sport	Huỳnh Phạm Thủy Tiên
Miss Talent	Đinh Phương Mỹ Duyên
Top Model	Nguyễn Hoài Phương Anh
Beach Beauty	Nguyễn Hoàng Bảo Châu

== Contestants ==
44 contestants in the final.

Contestants	No.
Nguyễn Thị Hồng Tuyết	052
Bùi Thị Yến Nhi	096
Lê Hoàng Bảo Trân	322
Phan Thị Diễm Trinh	305
Trịnh Thanh Châm	045
Nguyễn Thị Khánh Linh	088
Nguyễn Thị Thu Tâm	378
Lâm Thị Bích Tuyền	171
Phan Cẩm Nhi	077
Nguyễn Thị Thúy An	457
Hà Lương Bảo Hằng	216
Lê Thanh Tú	146
Đặng Thị Trúc Mai	295
Chu Thị Minh Trang	018
Phạm Ngọc Linh	569
Nguyễn Thị Nhật Minh	151
Vũ Hoàng Thảo Quyên	400
Trần Ngọc Lâm	548
Nguyễn Thúc Thùy Tiên	068
Huỳnh Phạm Thủy Tiên	031
Hà Thanh Vân	356
Bùi Phương Nga	486
Vũ Hương Giang	462
Phạm Thị Luyến	202
Phạm Ngọc Hà My	127
Lê Đoàn Hạ My	499
Đinh Phương Mỹ Duyên	069
Phạm Thị Thu Hà	182
Vũ Thị Thanh Thanh	245
Vũ Hoàng Thảo Vy	121
Trương Thị Thanh Bình	005
Lê Thị Hà Thu Chiêu	116
Phạm Thị Minh Châu	335
Vũ Thị Tuyết Trang	392
Đinh Thị Triều Tiên	535
Hoàng Thị Bích Ngọc	232
Nguyễn Hoàng Bảo Châu	169
Trần Tiểu Vy	138
Nguyễn Phương Anh	118
Nguyễn Hoài Phương Anh	256
Lại Quỳnh Giang	278
Dương Huyền Chân	267
Trần Thị Ngọc Bích	008
Lê Thị Mỹ Duyên	382
