= Nguyễn Cao Kỳ Duyên =

Nguyễn Cao Kỳ Duyên may refer to:

- Nguyễn Cao Kỳ Duyên (entertainer), Vietnamese–American television presenter
- Nguyễn Cao Kỳ Duyên (model), Miss Vietnam 2014 and Miss Universe Vietnam 2024 winner
