= Bùi Phương Nga =

Vietnamese model and beauty pageant titleholder

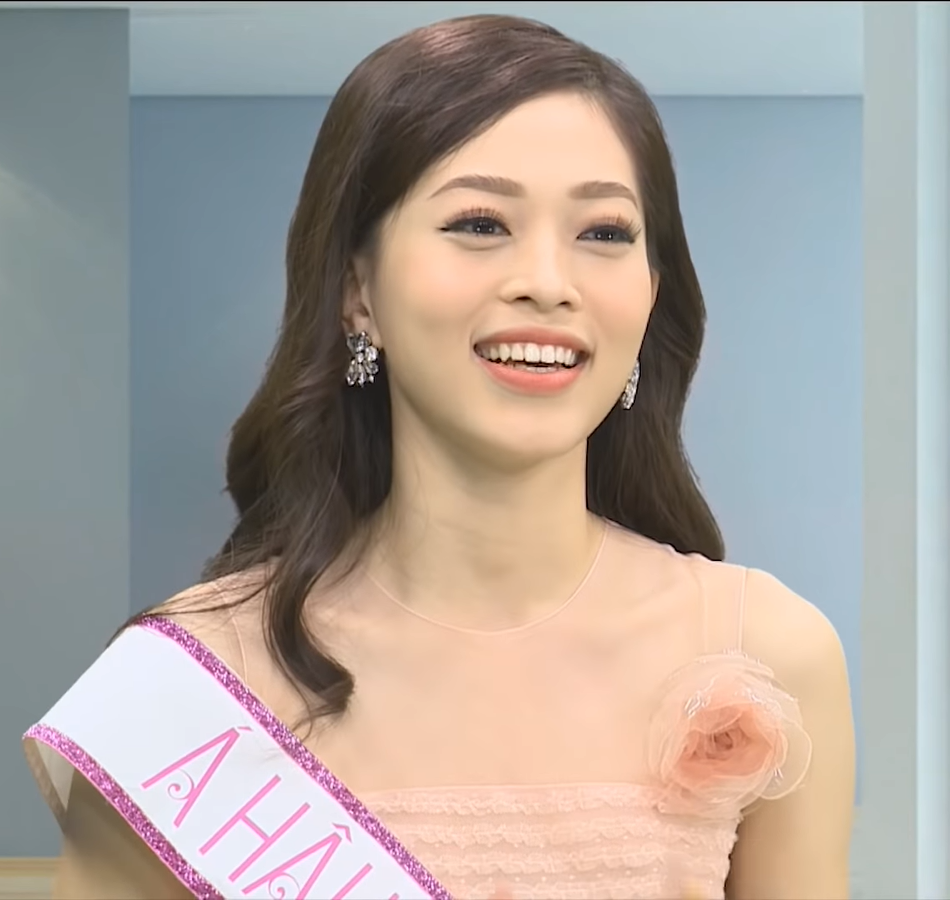
- Born: Bùi Phương Nga; November 16, 1998 (age 27); Ba Vì, Hà Nội, Vietnam
- Education: Kim Liên High School; National Economics University; Swinburne University of Technology
- Height: 1.73 m (5 ft 8 in)
- Beauty pageant titleholder
- Title: Miss Grand Vietnam 2018; 1st Runner-Up Miss Vietnam 2018
- Hair color: Black
- Eye color: Black
- Major competitions: Miss Vietnam 2018 (1st Runner-Up); Miss Grand International 2018 (Top 10)

Bùi Phương Nga is a Vietnamese model and beauty pageant titleholder, she was the 1st Runner-Up of the Miss Vietnam 2018, she was appointed Miss Grand Vietnam 2018 and she reached the Top 10 Miss Grand International 2018.

== Pageantry ==
=== Miss Vietnam 2018 ===
Bùi Phương Nga won the 1st Runner-Up at Miss Vietnam 2018. Crowned with her in the final night of Miss Vietnam 2018 on September 16, 2018, at Phú Thọ Indoor Stadium (Ho Chi Minh City). Minh) is Trần Tiểu Vy - Miss Vietnam 2018 and 2nd Runner-Up Nguyễn Thị Thúy An.

=== Miss Grand International 2018 ===
She was appointed Miss Grand Vietnam 2018 and represented Vietnam at Miss Grand International 2018 taking place in Yangon, Myanmar.

Receiving the most votes from the audience, she was directly entered into the Top 10 of the Miss Grand International 2018 contest. In addition, she also won Special awards: Miss Popular Vote, Most -Liked and Shared Official Portraits Photos in Asia and Oceania, Top 5 Hottest Contestants for Preliminary Competition, Top 12 Best National Costumes.

== Participated programs ==
=== MC ===
- Bữa trưa vui vẻ - VTV6
- Cà phê sáng với VTV3 - VTV3
- Vietnam travel - VTV1
- Cuộc sống tươi đẹp - VTV3
- Phiên chợ mùa xuân 2024 - VTV

=== Players, Guests ===
- Tường lửa - VTV3
- TTV hội tụ - TTV
- Cho ngày hoàn hảo - VTV2
- Tâm đầu ý hợp - HTV7
- Đường tới cầu vồng - VTV6
- Nhanh như chớp - HTV7
- Úm ba la ra chữ gì? (mùa 3) VTV3
- Tiền khéo Tiền khôn - VTV3
- Lời tự sự - VTV3
- Chuyện 2023 - HTV7
- S - Việt Nam - VTV1
- Của ngon vật lạ - VTV3

=== Guest Judge ===
- Alo English 2022 - VTV7
- Super Junior 2023 - VTV7

Awards and achievements
Preceded by (Indonesia) Dea Rizkita	Miss Popular Vote; 2018	Succeeded by (Vietnam) Nguyễn Hà Kiều Loan
Preceded by Nguyễn Trần Huyền My	Miss Grand Vietnam; 2018	Succeeded by Nguyễn Hà Kiều Loan
Preceded by Ngô Thanh Thanh Tú	1st Runner-Up Miss Vietnam; 2018	Succeeded by Phạm Ngọc Phương Anh
