= Miss Vietnam 2016 =

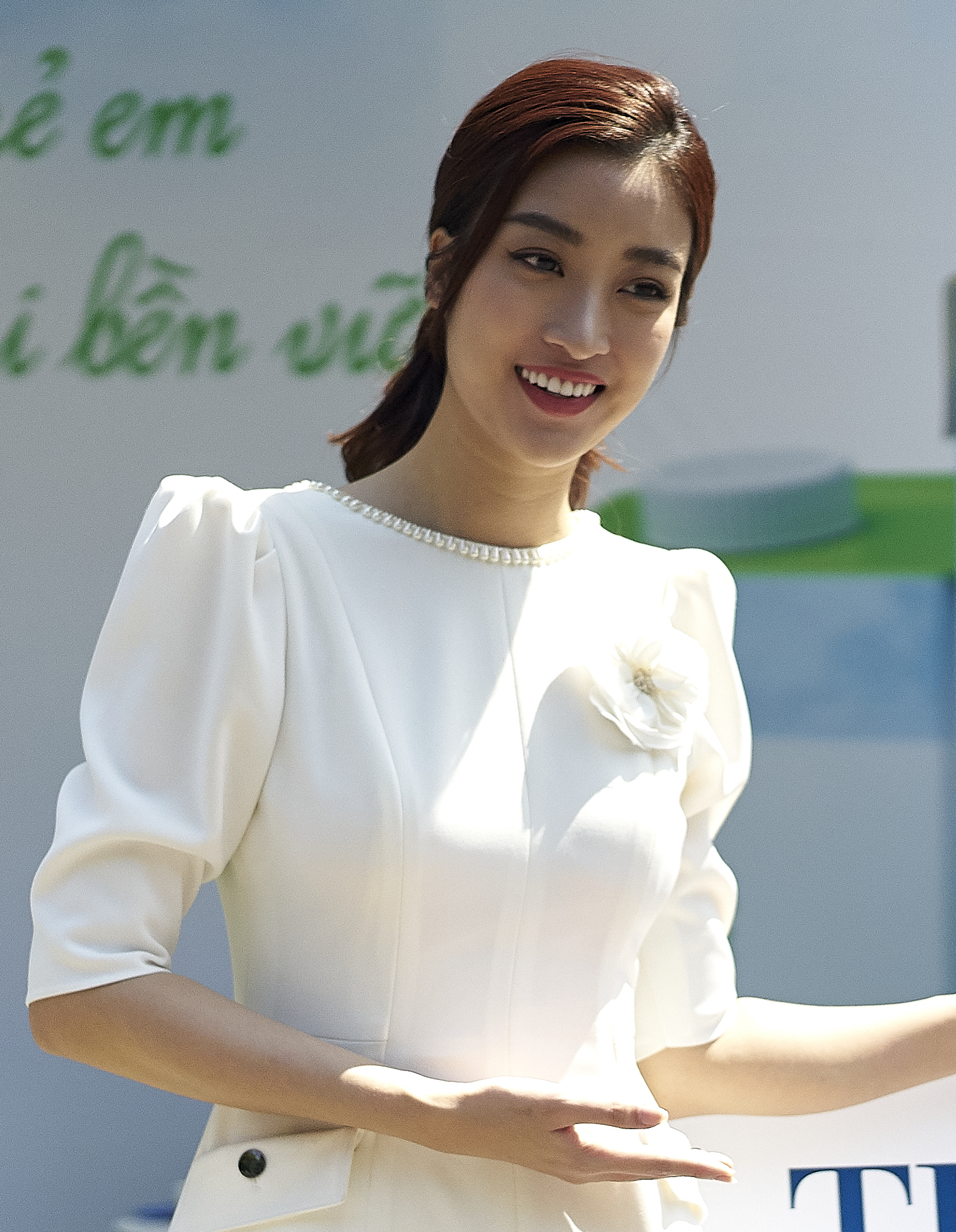
- Miss Vietnam 2016 Đỗ Mỹ Linh
- Date: August 28, 2016
- Entertainment: Bi Rain; Thu Minh; Tóc Tiên; Đông Nhi; Noo Phước Thịnh; Hà Anh Tuấn
- Venue: Phu Tho Indoor Stadium, District 11, Ho Chi Minh City
- Broadcaster: VTV1; VTV9
- Entrants: 36
- Placements: 10
- Winner: Đỗ Mỹ Linh; Hà Nội

Miss Vietnam 2016 (Vietnamese: Hoa hậu Việt Nam 2016) was the 15th edition of the Miss Vietnam pageant. It was held on August 28, 2016 at Phu Tho Indoor Stadium, Ho Chi Minh City, Vietnam. Miss Vietnam 2014 Nguyễn Cao Kỳ Duyên crowned her successor Đỗ Mỹ Linh at the end of the event.

From this year's edition, the Miss Vietnam contest will closely follow the format of the Miss World contest, notably the Beauty with a Purpose sub-contest which has received much attention from the media and audience for its humanitarian purpose.

== Results ==
=== Placements ===
Color keys

- Declared as the winner in an International pageant.
- Ended as Runner-up in an International pageant.
- Ended as finalist or semifinalist in an International pageant.
- Unplaced.

Final result	Contestant	International pageant	International placement
Miss Vietnam 2016	145 – Đỗ Mỹ Linh	Miss World 2017	Top 40
1st Runner-Up	246 – Ngô Thanh Thanh Tú		
2nd Runner-Up	015 – Huỳnh Thị Thùy Dung	Miss International 2017	Unplaced
Top 5	Phạm Thủy Tiên § - Hanoi; Đào Thị Hà - Nghệ An		
Top 10	Trần Tố Như - Thái Nguyên; Sái Thị Hương Ly - Hanoi; Phùng Bảo Ngọc Vân - Hanoi; Nguyễn Thùy Linh - Đồng Nai; Bùi Nữ Kiều Vỹ - Quảng Nam		

§ Winner Beauty with a Purpose Vietnam

=== Special awards ===
Special Award	Contestant
Winner Beauty with a Purpose Vietnam	Phạm Thủy Tiên - Hanoi
Miss Media	Phùng Bảo Ngọc Vân - Hanoi
Best Face	Trần Tố Như - Thái Nguyên
Best Evening Gown	Trần Thị Thu Hiền - Lâm Đồng
Best Skin	Sái Thị Hương Ly - Hanoi
Miss Beach	Đào Thị Hà - Nghệ An
Miss Talent	Huỳnh Thị Thùy Dung - Ho Chi Minh City
Best Hair	Hoàng Thị Quỳnh Loan - Thừa Thiên-Huế
Miss Áo dài	Bùi Nữ Kiều Vỹ - Quảng Nam

== Contestants ==
36 contestants in the final.

Contestants	No.
Vũ Thị Vân Anh	068
Trịnh Phương Trang	296
Trần Tố Như	193
Trần Thị Thu Hiền	104
Phùng Lan Hương	132
Trần Huyền Trang	286
Sái Thị Hương Ly	151
Phan Thu Phương	236
Phạm Thủy Tiên	239
Nguyễn Thị Ngọc Vân	323
Phùng Bảo Ngọc Vân	268
Đỗ Mỹ Linh	145
Đào Thị Hà	094
Nguyễn Hương Mỹ Linh	139
Nguyễn Cát Nhiên	188
Huỳnh Thúy Vi	290
Nguyễn Bảo Ngọc	179
Huỳnh Thị Thùy Dung	015
Nguyễn Huỳnh Kim Duyên	036
Nguyễn Thùy Linh	118
Hoàng Thị Quỳnh Loan	128
H'Ăng Niê	155
Phan Thị Hồng Phúc	170
Nguyễn Thị Thành	196
Hoàng Thị Phương Thảo	206
Trần Ngô Thu Thảo	218
Lục Thị Thu Thảo	226
Trần Thị Thủy	234
Nguyễn Thị Như Thủy	242
Trần Thị Thùy Trang	255
Nguyễn Vũ Hoài Trang	276
Lê Trần Ngọc Trân	280
Phạm Châu Tường Vi	289
Bùi Nữ Kiều Vỹ	293
Trần Thị Phương Thảo	299
