= Chế Nguyễn Quỳnh Châu =

Vietnamese model and pianist (born 1994)

Chế Châu
- Chế Nguyễn Quỳnh Châu
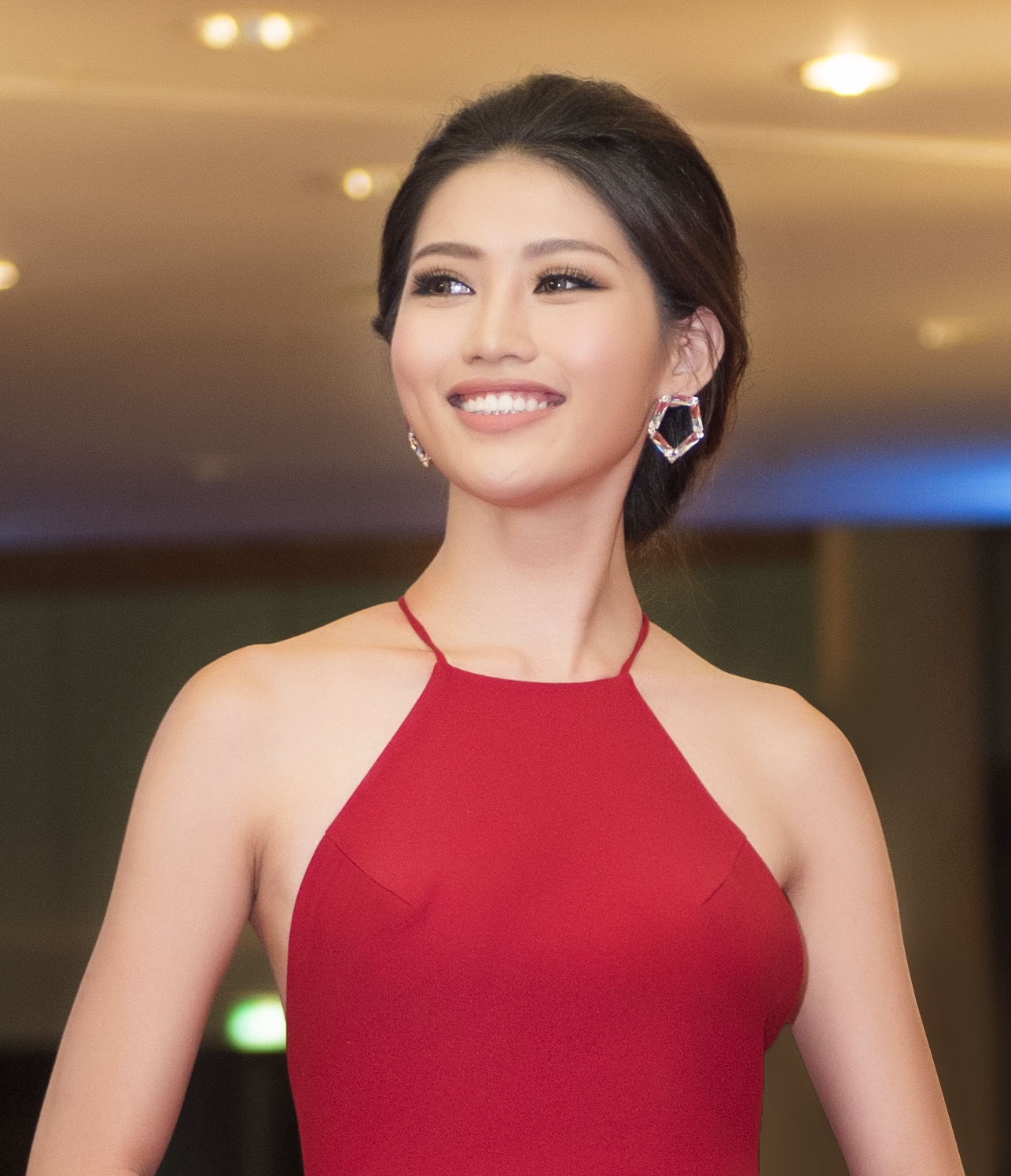
- Chế Châu in 2014
- Born: July 3, 1994 (age 32); Lâm Đồng, Vietnam
- Other names: Bill Quỳnh; Châu July
- Education: Võ Trường Toản High School; University of Finance – Marketing
- Occupations: Model; actor; MC
- Known for: 1st Runner-up at Miss Grand Vietnam 2022
- Height: 1.75 m (5 ft 9 in)
- Spouse: Nguyễn Ngọc Phát (m. 2025)
- Beauty pageant titleholder
- Title: Winner Project Runway Vietnam 2014; Winner of Vietnam Fashion Icon 2014; 1st Runner-up Miss Grand Vietnam 2022
- Agency: Sen Vảng Entertainment
- Years active: 2013–present
- Hair color: Black
- Eye color: Brown
- Major competitions: Miss Grand Vietnam 2022 (1st runner-up); Vietnam Fashion Icon 2014 (Winner); F-idol 2013 (Impressive prize)

Chế Nguyễn Quỳnh Châu (born July 3, 1994) is a Vietnamese model, MC and actress. She became famous when participating in the movies Apple tree blooms, Dad, I'm Sorry,… and her highest achievement was first runner-up of Miss Grand Vietnam 2022 contest.

Chế Châu was praised by Đẹp magazine as a female model who contributes to the voice of the LGBT community in Vietnam. At the same time, she is an important figure in Miss International Queen Vietnam.

== Biography ==
Quỳnh Châu was born and raised in Lâm Đồng, where she studied at Võ Trường Toản High School. She then attended the University of Finance – Marketing in Hồ Chí Minh City. During her studies, she worked as a model and then she participated in a number of model and beauty pageants.

She married businessman Nguyễn Ngọc Phát at the Church of the Sacred Heart of Jesus, Tân Định, Hồ Chí Minh City in October 2025.

== Career ==
In 2013 she entered and won the F-idol contest. In 2014, she won the Vietnam Fashion Icon competition. In the same year, she modelled and won the Project Runway Vietnam contest for designer Lý Giám Tiên. After that, she participated in Vietnam's Next Top Model season 5 and reached the top nine.

She entered Miss Universe Vietnam 2015 and reached the top 15. In 2016, she participated in Miss Ao Dai Vietnam and reached the top five. In 2017, she participated in the MasterChef Vietnam and reached episode five. At Miss Grand Vietnam 2002, she was first runner-up.

== Filmography ==
=== Movies ===
Year	Movie		Role	Director	Note
Year	In Vietnamese	In English	Role	Director	Note
2019	Hoa hậu Giang hồ	Miss Gangster	Her	Lương Mạnh Hải	
2021	Bố già	Dad, I'm Sorry	Châu	Trấn Thành; Vũ Ngọc Đãng	

=== TV series ===
Year	Title	Role	Director	Broadcast	Note
2011	Soldier (Vietnamese film)	Aleksandr Chernyaev	Unknown	N-tv	
2011	Pha lê không dễ vỡ	Trương Dũng	Unknown	VTV9	
2013	Sông dài	Trương Dũng	Ms.Hai Nhếch	VTV9	
2015	Hãy nói về tình yêu	Trương Dũng	Thanh	HTV9	
2018	Gia đình sô bít	—N/a	Khương Dừa	HTV7	
2019	Muôn kiểu làm dâu	Hoàng My	Cẩm Hà; Phạm Tuân	HTV7	
2021	Kiếm chồng cho mẹ chồng	Toàn Thư	Phạm Tuân	HTV7	
2021	Apple tree blooms	Mỹ	Võ Thạch Thảo	HTV2	
2023	Mặt trời mùa đông	Thảo An	Trần Bửu Lộc	HTVC	
2024	Ván cờ danh vọng	Hương Giang	Nguyễn Quang Minh	VTV9	

== Programme ==
Year	Program	Role	Broadcast on	Ref.
2013	Fashion Idol	Candidate	HTV9	
2014	Vietnam Fashion Icon	Candidate	HTV9	
2014	Project Runway Vietnam	Model	VTV3	
2014	Vietnam's Next Top Model	Candidate	VTV3	
2015	Miss Universe Vietnam	Candidate	VTV3	
2016	Miss World Vietnam	Candidate	VTV3	
2017	Asia's Next Top Model	Do not participate		
2022	Miss Grand Vietnam	Candidate	Grand TV	
2022	Miss Vietnam	MC	VTV3	
2023	Miss Grand Vietnam	MC	GrandTV	
2023	Miss International Queen Vietnam	Mentor	YouTube	
2023	Miss World Vietnam	MC	VTV2	
2024	Spread the passion for Aquabike	MC	YouTube	
2024	Miss Universe Vietnam	MC	YouTube	
2025	Miss International Queen Vietnam	Mentor	YouTube	
2025	Aquafina Vietnam International Fashion Week	Judger	YouTube	

== Notes ==
Awards and achievements
Preceded by None	1st Runner-Up Miss Grand Vietnam; 2022	Succeeded by Bùi Khánh Linh
