= Ho Chi Minh City University of Technology and Engineering =

University in Vietnam

- Trường Đại học Công nghệ Kỹ thuật Thành phố Hồ Chí Minh
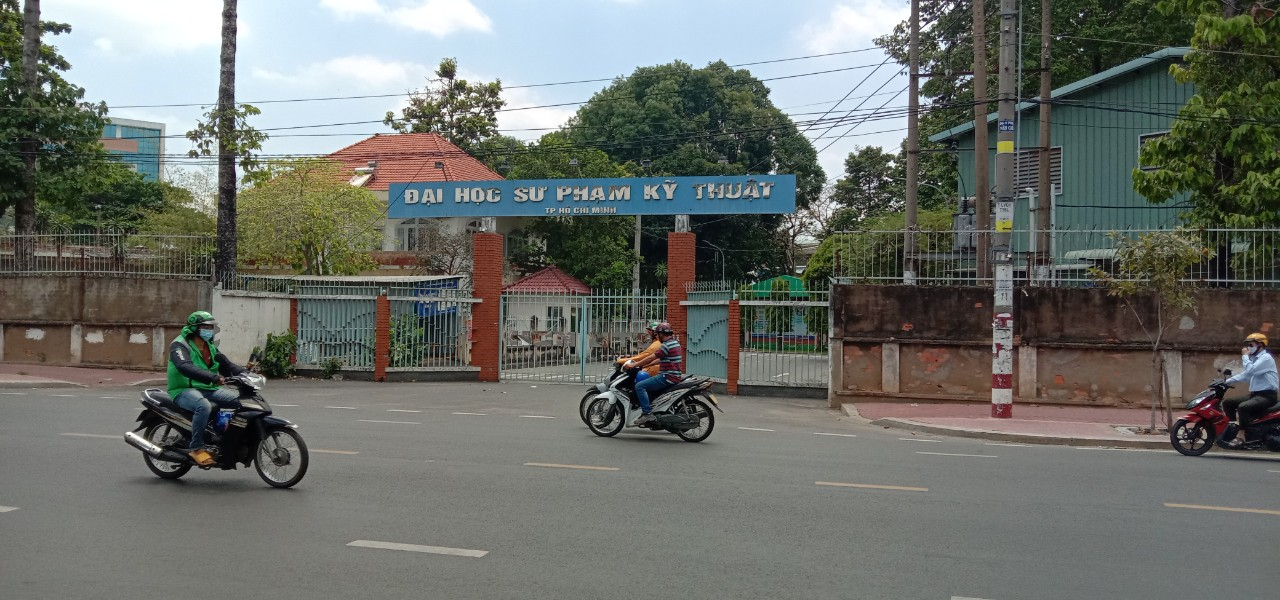
- Campus 1 main gate
- Former names: Ho Chi Minh City University of Technology and Education
- Motto: Phát triển toàn diện, bền vững và hội nhập quốc tế
- Motto in English: Grow into a well-rounded individual, and globalize
- Type: Public
- Established: October 5th, 1962
- President: Dr. Le Hieu Giang, Assoc. Prof.
- Students: 30,000
- Undergraduates: 29,000
- Postgraduates: 1,000
- Location: 1 Võ Văn Ngân Street, Thủ Đức ward, Ho Chi Minh City, Vietnam; 10.8499°N 106.7717°E
- Campus: Urban
- Website: en.hcmute.edu.vn
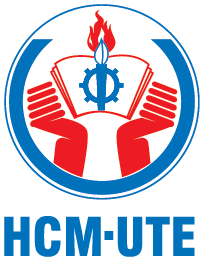

Ho Chi Minh City University of Technology and Engineering, formerly Ho Chi Minh City University of Technology and Education (Abbreviation: HCMUTE, Vietnamese: Trường Đại học Công nghệ Kỹ thuật Thành phố Hồ Chí Minh) is a public university in Ho Chi Minh City, Vietnam. It is currently regarded as one of the top technical universities in Vietnam.

This is a public university located in Thủ Đức Ward, about 10 km (6.2 mi) north-east from downtown Ho Chi Minh City. This university offers multidisciplinary bachelor's degree from engineering, technology to economics, laws and linguistics. The university also conducts technical research and vocational training, in addition to educational cooperation with foreign universities in the US, the UK, Australia, France, Korea, Taiwan, etc.

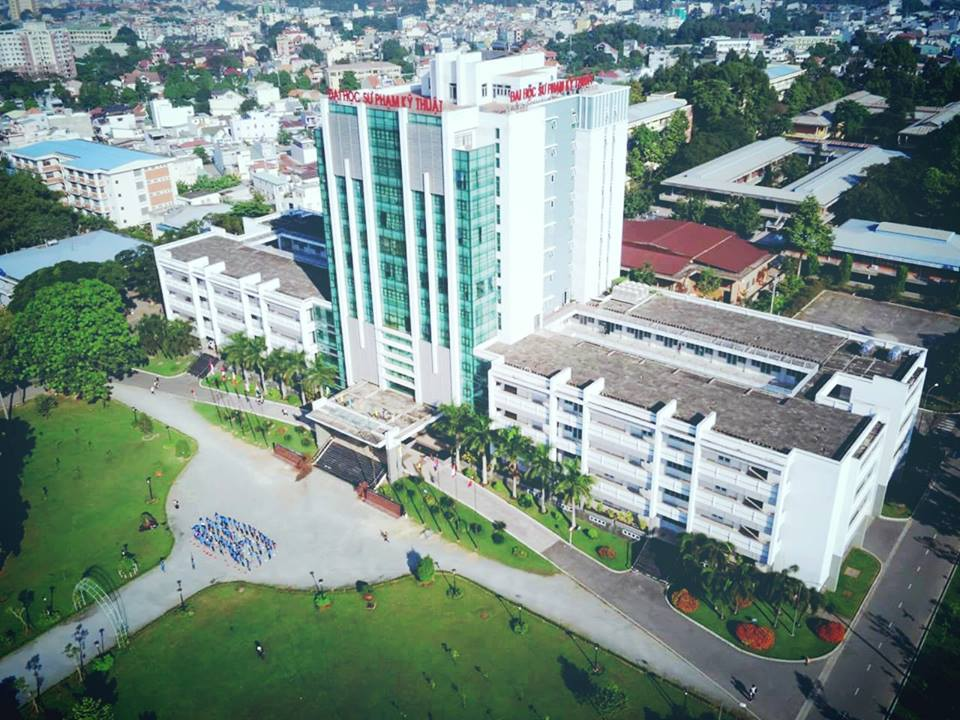
The central building of the Ho Chi Minh City University of Technology and Engineering

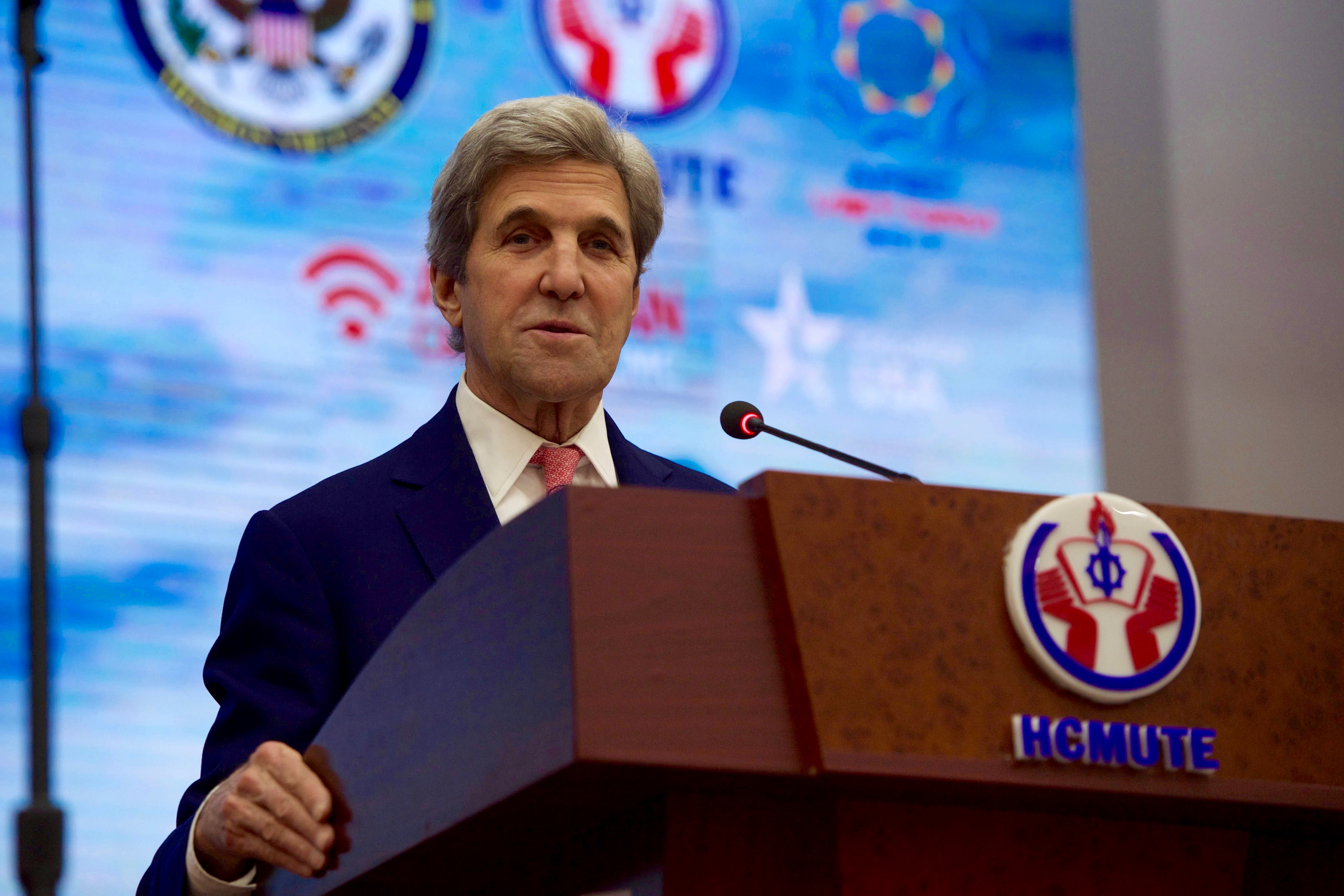
Secretary Kerry visited and delivered speech at Ho Chi Minh University of Technology and Engineering

== History ==
Ho Chi Minh City University of Technology and Engineering (HCMUTE) is the first university in Vietnam educating and training technical teachers for the whole country. Chronologically, HCMUTE has been renamed several times due to integration with other schools or its own promotion.

The university evolved from the Board of Technical Education, first founded on October 5, 1962, then renamed Nguyen Truong To Center for Technical Education in Thu Duc in September 1972, and later upgraded to Thu Duc College of Education in 1974. On October 27, 1976, the SRV Prime Minister issued a decision to establish Thu Duc University of Technical Education on the basis of Thu Duc College of Education. This was amalgamated with Thu Duc Industrial Vocational School in 1984 and further merged with Technical Teacher Training School No.5 in 1991 to become Ho Chi Minh City University of Technology and Education. In 1995, the university incorporated with National University Ho Chi Minh City as an informal member. In 2000, HCMUTE became a member under supervision of Ministry of Education and Training of Vietnam (MoET). In December 26, 2025, the Deputy Prime Minister of Vietnam signed a decision to rename the university as the present day Ho Chi Minh City University of Technology and Engineering.

=== Milestones ===
- October 5, 1962: Founded as Board of Technical Education founded with five disciplines
- 1972: Renamed as Nguyen Truong To Center for Technical Education in Thu Duc
- 1974: Upgraded to Thu Duc College of Education
- October 27, 1976: Promoted to Thu Duc University of Technical Education
- 1984: Thu Duc Industrial Vocational School amalgamated with Thu Duc University of Technical Education
- 1991: Technical Teacher Training School No. 5 amalgamated with Thu Duc University of Technical Education
- 1992: First post graduate program started
- 1995: Became non-official member of Vietnam National University Ho Chi Minh City
- 2000: Separated from Vietnam National University Ho Chi Minh City
- November 2011: The Center Building inaugurated
- March 2012: 3 PhD programs started
- October 2014: Renamed as Ho Chi Minh City University of Technology and Education
- December 26, 2025: Renamed as Ho Chi Minh City University of Technology and Engineering

=== Governmental Awards ===
During its more than 60 years of development, HCMUTE has been granted many governmental awards for excellent performance, such as an Independence Decoration - Second Class (2012), Independence Decoration - Third Class (2007), a Labor Decoration - First Class (2001), a Labor Decoration -Second Class (1996), a Labor Decoration - Third Class (1985) by the SRV President, an Emulation Flag of the Government (2008), an Emulation Flag of the MoET (2009), Emulation Flag of Ho Chi Minh City People Committee (2012), many other Certificates of Merit and so on.

== Infrastructure ==
- Campus 1 (main): No.1 Võ Văn Ngân Street, Linh Chiểu (now is Thủ Đức ward)
- Campus 2: 484 Lê Văn Việt Street, Tăng Nhơn Phú
- Bình Phước Branch: 899 National Route 14, Đồng Xoài, Bình Phước province (now is Bình Phước ward, Đồng Nai province)

Ho Chi Minh University of Technology and Engineering has two campuses with total area of 21 ha (52 acres) and 128,128 m^{2} (1,379,160 sq ft) of construction area includes 98 practice workshops (16,980 m^{2} [182,800 sq ft]) and 58 laboratories (10,362 m^{2} [111,540 sq ft]), 175 classrooms with a total area of 27,902 m^{2} (300,330 sq ft), size of each varying from 42 to 187 m^{2} (450 to 2,010 sq ft).

Computers: 1,100 for teaching, learning and research; 450 for management and administration.

HCMUTE also has a football field (10,000 m^{2} [110,000 sq ft]), three volleyball courts, a tennis court, a sporting event hall and two dormitories.

== Accreditation ==
Ho Chi Minh University of Technology and Engineering is proud to be one of the first ten accredited universities in Vietnam, one of the first few universities applying ISO 9001 management system.

=== ASEAN University Network – Quality Assurance ===
HCMUTE has ASEAN University Network – Quality Assurance (AUN-QA) Standard Accreditation for 18 programs:

- Electrical and Electronics Engineering Technology
- Mechatronics Engineering Technology
- Automotive Engineering Technology
- Construction Engineering Technology
- Electronic and Communication Technology
- Mechanical Engineering
- Thermal Engineering
- Environmental Engineering Technology
- Machine Manufacturing Technology
- Automation and Control Engineering Technology
- Industrial Technology
- Garment Technology
- Information Technology
- Printing Technology
- Chemical Engineering Technology
- Biomedical Engineering Technology
- Linguistics (English)
- Accounting

== Academic programs ==
Ho Chi Minh City University of Technology and Engineering offers 45 Bachelor's Degrees, 16 Master's Degrees and 7 Doctorate Degrees in 14 Faculties and Institutes.

=== Schools and departments ===
==== Faculties ====
- Faculty of Vehicle and Energy Engineering
- Faculty of Mechanical Engineering
- Faculty of Electrical and Electronic Engineering
- Faculty of Chemical and Food Technology
- Faculty of Civil Engineering and Applied Mechanics
- Faculty of Applied Sciences
- Faculty of Garment Technology and Fashion Design
- Faculty of Graphic Arts and Media
- Faculty of International Education
- Faculty of Information Technology
- Faculty of Economics
- Faculty of Foreign Languages
- Faculty of Political Sciences and Laws
- Faculty of Advanced Education

==== Institutes and research centers ====
- Institute of Technical Education
- Energy and Environment Lab
- Center for Innovation and Startup
- Makerspace

== Gallery ==
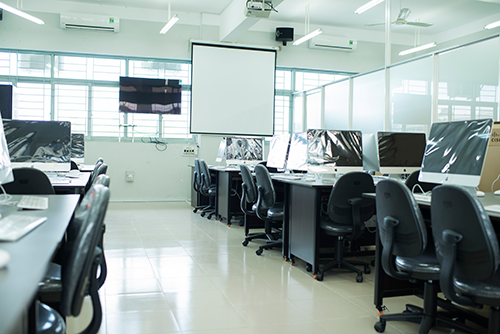
Laboratory of iOS and macOS programming

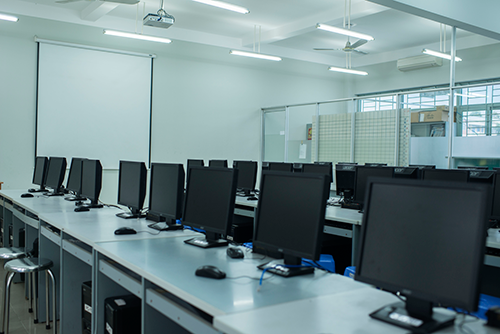
Laboratory of Computer network

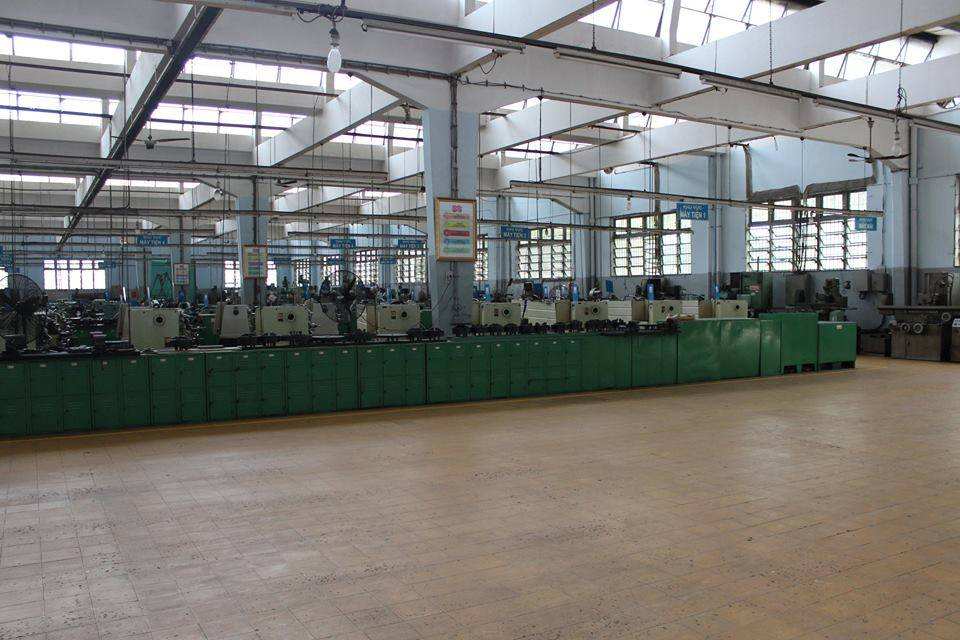
Mechanical workshop

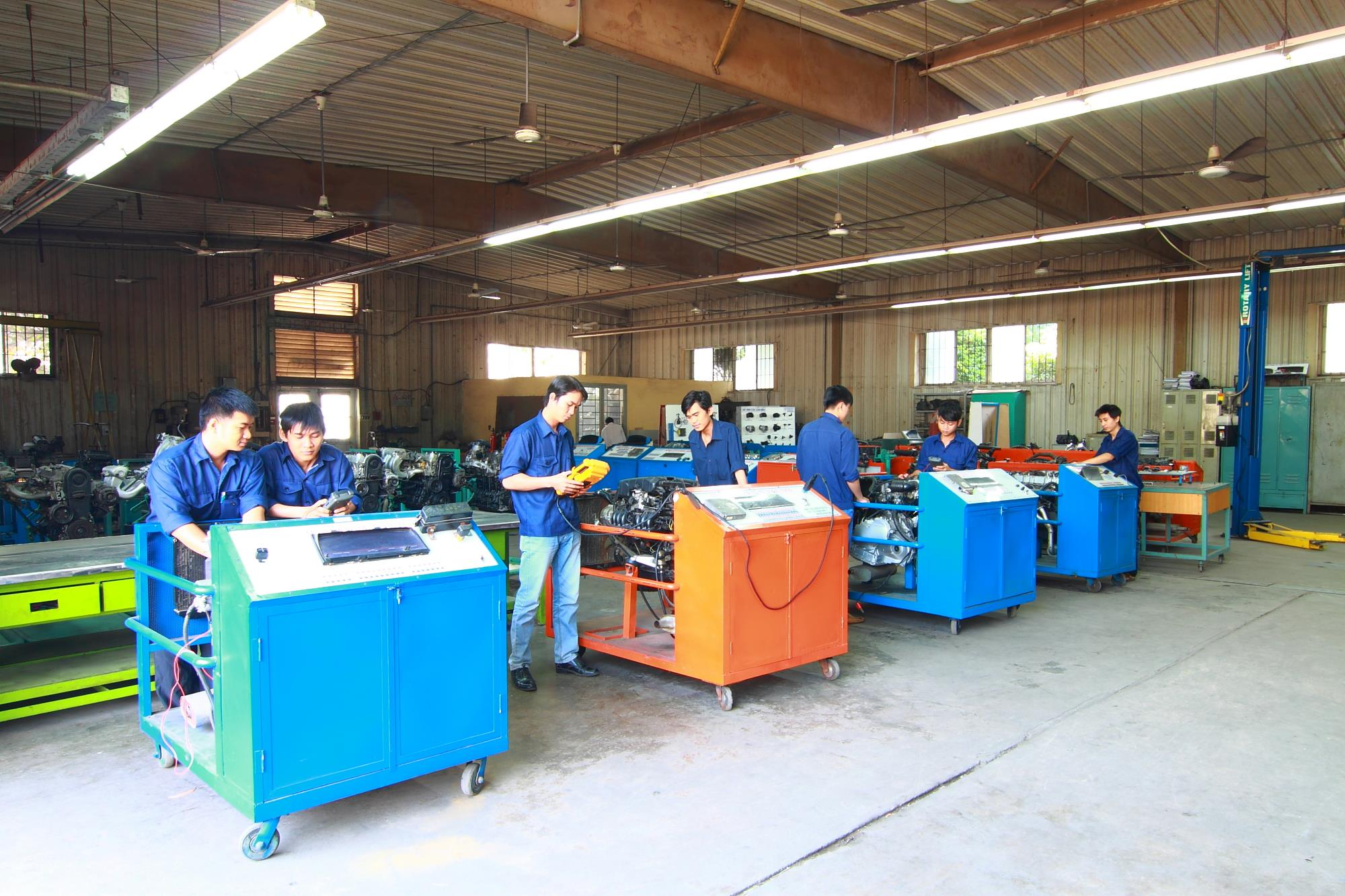
Students working at Faculty of Vehicle and Energy engineering

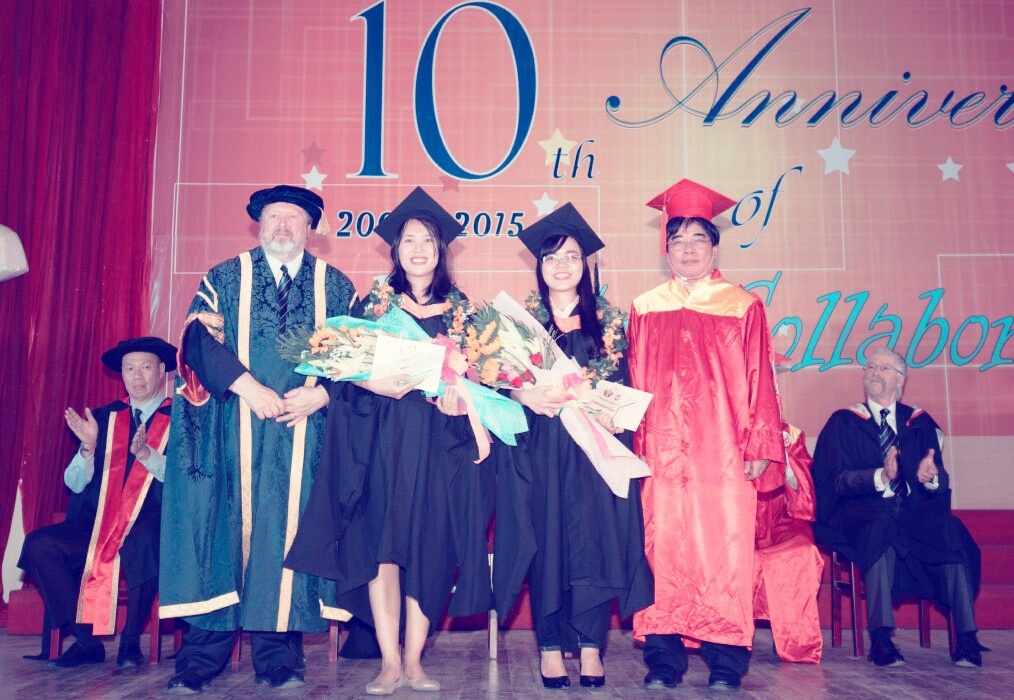
Sunderland University students studied at HCMUTE
