= Phú Thọ Horse Racing Ground =

Former horse racing venue in Ho Chi Minh City, Vietnam

Coordinates: 10°46′03″N 106°39′22″E

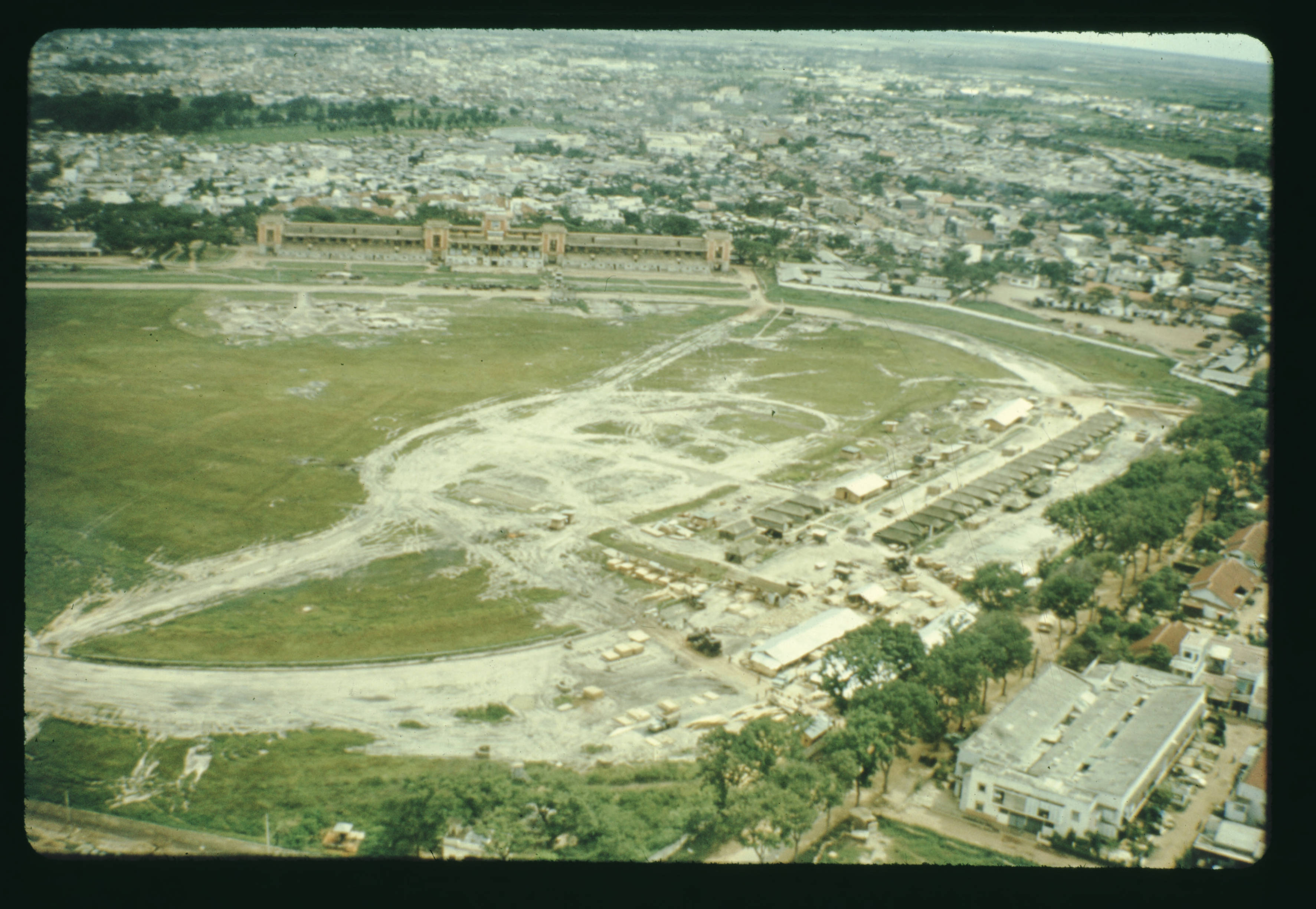
Phú Thọ Racetrack, refugee housing, 29 July 1968

Phu Tho Horse Racing Ground was the only place in Ho Chi Minh City and in Vietnam that organized horse racing. The racing ground was founded by the French colonists during French Indochina and named after a village where the ground was situated name Phú Thọ, now is a ward in Ho Chi Minh City.

It was the scene of a major battle between the Viet Cong and the Army of the Republic of Vietnam and the United States Army during the Tet Offensive.

Phu Tho racecourse was built by the French in 1932 with an area of 444,540 m2. From May 31, 2011, the racecourse was closed by decision of the People's Committee of Ho Chi Minh City.

== Redevelopment ==
According to the 1/2000 scale zoning plan approved by the Ho Chi Minh City People's Committee on June 22, 2018, the Phú Thọ Racing Ground area will be a multi-functional zone, combining existing and new construction. The mixed-use area will be located near the existing residential area in the northwest, forming a residential area with an expanded existing primary school, a kindergarten, and a concentrated green park area, meeting the social infrastructure needs of the community. Public facilities, parks, green spaces, schools, and underground parking will be located in the central area of the Phu Tho Racecourse. The existing horse racing grandstand will be preserved as a cultural value…

Subsequently, on May 5, 2025, the Ho Chi Minh City People's Committee issued a decision approving a partial adjustment to the 1/2000 scale zoning plan for the Phú Thọ Racing Ground area, adding underground space planning and connecting underground structures with above-ground structures.

Mr. Trần Anh Tuấn, Director of the Investment and Construction Project Management Board of District 11, said that there are 14 investment and construction projects in the Phú Thọ Racing Ground area. Of these, the board is the investor for 6 projects, including: a new kindergarten construction project; a new high school construction project; a park and recreational area construction project for young people; a new public park construction project; an infrastructure and road construction project; and the renovation and expansion project of Nguyễn Thị Nhỏ Primary School. The Phú Thọ Multi-purpose Performing Arts Theater is the new construction was started to built in 2023, and the Phú Thọ Arena was renovated in 2025; both are now completed.

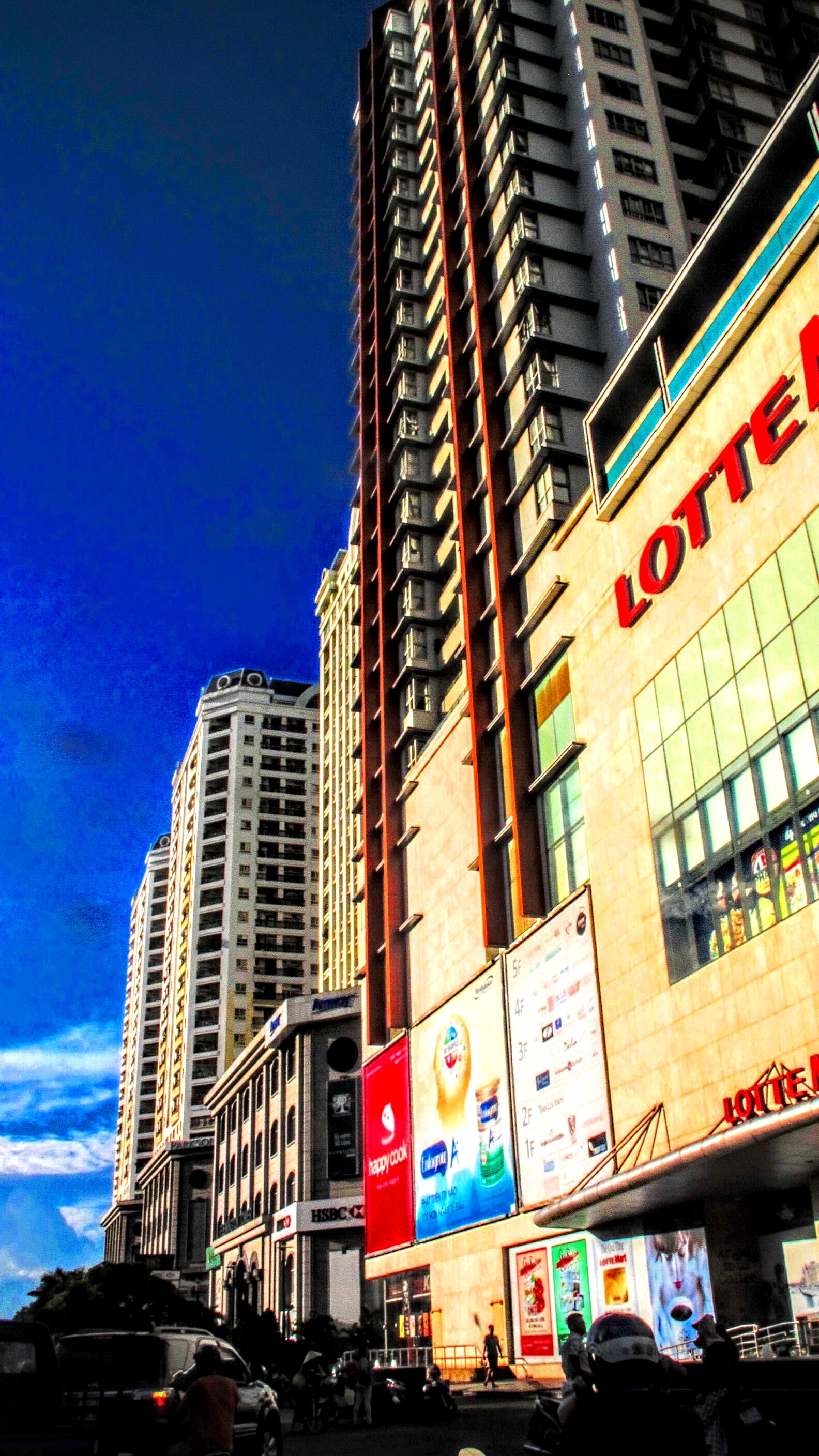
The EverRich Building and The Flemington Towers

=== Public space and sport facilities ===
- Phú Thọ Indoor Stadium
- Phú Thọ Multi-purpose Performing Arts Theater

=== Mixed-use buildings ===
- The Flemington (featuring Flemington Office Tower and The Emporium Mall, formerly Parkson)
- The EverRich Building (featuring the Lotte Mart Phú Thọ)
- The Park Avenue by Novaland Group
