= Miss Universe Vietnam 2024 =

7th Miss Universe Vietnam pageant

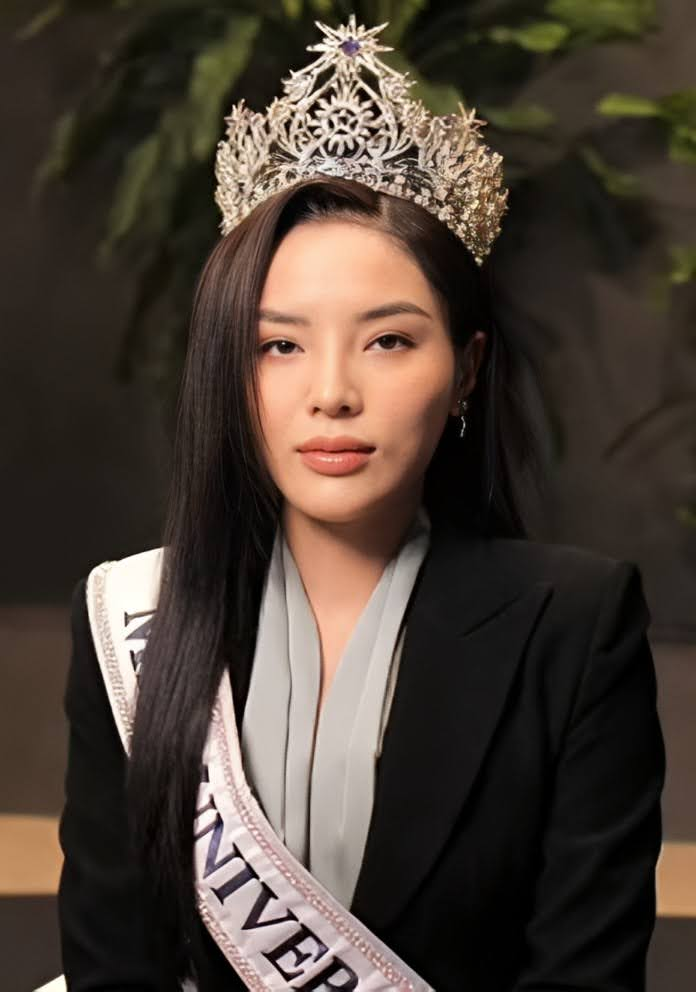
- Date: September 14, 2024
- Presenters: Thành Trung; Hoàng Oanh; Chế Nguyễn Quỳnh Châu
- Entertainment: Hương Giang; Pháp Kiều; Ali Hoàng Dương; Rhyder; Captain Boy; WEAN; (Semi-final): Quinzel Nguyễn; Mỹ Linh; Hà Trần; Thanh Lam; (final)
- Venue: Phú Thọ Indoor Stadium, District 11, Ho Chi Minh City, Vietnam
- Broadcaster: YouTube; Facebook; FPT Play
- Entrants: 33
- Placements: 16
- Winner: Nguyễn Cao Kỳ Duyên; Nam Định
- Best National Costume: Vũ Thúy Quỳnh; Điện Biên
- Photogenic: Đoàn Tường Linh; Lâm Đồng

Miss Universe Vietnam 2024 was the seventh Miss Universe Vietnam pageant, held at the Phú Thọ Indoor Stadium in Ho Chi Minh City, Vietnam, on September 14, 2024.

Bùi Quỳnh Hoa of Hanoi crowned Nguyễn Cao Kỳ Duyên of Nam Định as her successor at the end of the event. Nguyễn Cao Kỳ Duyên represented Vietnam at the Miss Universe 2024 pageant, held in Mexico on November 16, 2024, and ended in the Top 30.

== Contest Information ==
- The CEO of Miss Universe Vietnam shared that the Miss Universe contest starting in 2024 will increase the age to participate in the contest from 18 to 29 to 18 to 33. And follow the hard regulations of the Ministry of Culture, Sports and Tourism. The organizers of the Miss Universe Vietnam contest will not accept applications or registrations for the Miss Universe Vietnam 2024 contest from female contestants who have been married, had children, and are transgender.
- Starting from this year's season, 1st Runner Up Miss Universe Vietnam 2023 - Nguyễn Thị Hương Ly will replace Nguyễn Thị Quỳnh Nga's position as national director. The contest is jointly organized with Huong Giang Entertainment and DST Entertainment.

== Results ==
=== Placements ===
Placement	Contestant
Miss Universe Vietnam 2024	Nam Định – Nguyễn Cao Kỳ Duyên §
1st Runner-up	Hanoi – Nguyễn Quỳnh Anh
2nd Runner-up	Điện Biên – Vũ Thúy Quỳnh
Top 5	Ho Chi Minh City – Paris Bảo Nhi; Ho Chi Minh City – Quách Tapiau Maily
Top 10	Hanoi – Đỗ Thu Hà; Hanoi – Phí Phương Anh; Lâm Đồng – Đoàn Tường Linh; Nam Định – Nguyễn Thị Trà My; Phú Yên – Đinh Thị Triều Tiên
Top 16	Bình Định – Đoàn Thị Thu Hà; Bình Thuận – Nguyễn Thị Thu Thảo; Cà Mau – Nguyễn Diễm My; Hải Dương – Lương Thị Hoa Đan; Ho Chi Minh City – Lê Thị Kim Huyền; Quảng Ninh – Phạm Thị Đan Chi

§ – Voted into the Top 16 by viewers

=== Special awards ===
Award	Contestant
Community Project Winner	040 - Vũ Thúy Quỳnh; 042 - Đỗ Thu Hà (Hà Kino)
Best in Evening Gown	032 - Paris Bảo Nhi
Best in National Costume	040 - Vũ Thúy Quỳnh
Best in Swimsuit	020 - Quách Tapiau Maily (Mlee)
Miss Ao Dai	034 - Phí Phương Anh
Miss Interview	029 - Đoàn Thị Thu Hà
Miss Photogenic	044 - Đoàn Tường Linh
Miss Popular Vote	039 - Nguyễn Cao Kỳ Duyên
Miss Talent	034 - Phí Phương Anh

== Pageant ==
=== Format ===
The number of semi-finalists was increased to sixteen. The results of the preliminary competition, which composed of swimsuit and evening gown portions, determined the first fifteen semi-finalists selected at large. Online voting winner advanced as the sixteenth semi-finalist. The initial cut of semi-finalists competed in the Ao Dai portion of the event, from which ten delegates were chosen to advance to the evening gown portion. Five delegates were then announced as finalists and competed in the interview questions, and were then narrowed down to three. The three finalists competed in one final question, after which the winner and her two runners-up were named.

=== Selection committee ===
The semi-final competition was broadcast live on the official Miss Universe Vietnam YouTube channel at 8pm GMT on September 11, 2024, with the panel of judges consisted of:

- Nguyễn Thị Thúy Nga – CEO of Miss Universe Vietnam
- Dược sĩ Tiến – Reality show producer and television personality
- Hà Đỗ – Creative director of Đẹp magazine
- Thanh Hằng – Supermodel, actress and television personality
- Hương Giang – Miss International Queen 2018, singer and reality show producer
- Anntonia Porsild – Miss Universe 2023 1st Runner-up from Thailand

The final competition was broadcast live on the official Miss Universe YouTube channel at 8pm GMT on September 14, 2024, with the panel of judges consisted of:

- Nguyễn Thị Thúy Nga – CEO of Miss Universe Vietnam
- Dược sĩ Tiến – Reality show producer and television personality
- Hà Đỗ – Creative director of Đẹp magazine
- Thanh Hằng – Supermodel, actress and television personality
- Metinee Kingpayom – Thai supermodel, actress and television personality
- Zozibini Tunzi – Miss Universe 2019 from South Africa

== Contestants ==
33 contestants competed for the title.

No	Contestants	Age	Height	Hometown	Notes
002	Nguyễn Thị Hồng Vân	21	1,75 m	Thừa Thiên Huế	
003	Võ Thị Ngọc Châu	25	1,74 m	Long An	
006	Bùi Hạnh Nguyên	27	1,80 m	Long An	
007	Nguyễn Thị Thu Thảo	28	1,70 m	Bình Thuận	
009	Vưu Ngọc Duyên	22	1,72 m	Cà Mau	
012	Nguyễn Diễm My	26	1,75 m	Cà Mau	
013	Trần Thị Thu Huỳnh	22	1,73 m	An Giang	
016	Ngô Thị Kiều Trang	23	1,70 m	Cà Mau	
017	Nguyễn Thị Nga	21	1,76 m	Bắc Giang	
018	Nguyễn Lê Nhật Nhi	21	1,68 m	Thừa Thiên Huế	
020	Quách Tapiau Maily	32	1,77 m	Ho Chi Minh City	
022	Triệu Thiên Trang	26	1,67 m	Ho Chi Minh City	
023	Nguyễn Ngọc Hân	21	1,75 m	Cần Thơ	
024	Đinh Thị Triều Tiên	26	1,75 m	Phú Yên	
025	Lê Kim Quế Đan	24	1,73 m	Đồng Nai	
026	Nguyễn Yến Linh	32	1,68 m	Ho Chi Minh City	
027	Lương Thị Hoa Đan	23	1,80 m	Hải Dương	
028	Lê Thị Kiều Nhung	26	1,82 m	Trà Vinh	
029	Đoàn Thị Thu Hà	30	1,69 m	Bình Định	
030	Phạm Thị Đan Chi	27	1,75 m	Quảng Ninh	
032	Paris Bảo Nhi	24	1,74 m	Ho Chi Minh City	
033	Trương Gia Hân	23	1,73 m	Đồng Tháp	
034	Phí Phương Anh	27	1,77 m	Hanoi	
035	Nguyễn Thanh Hảo	25	1,70 m	Bà Rịa-Vũng Tàu	
037	Lê Thị Thúy	23	1,72 m	Đắk Lắk	
038	Nguyễn Thị Trà My	32	1,78 m	Nam Định	
039	Nguyễn Cao Kỳ Duyên	28	1,76 m	Nam Định	
040	Vũ Thúy Quỳnh	26	1,75 m	Điện Biên	
041	Nguyễn Quỳnh Anh	25	1,74 m	Hanoi	
042	Đỗ Thu Hà	32	1,79 m	Hanoi	
043	Đoàn Tường Linh	24	1,77 m	Lâm Đồng	
045	Lê Thị Kim Huyền	25	1,77 m	Ho Chi Minh City	
047	Nguyễn Thị Hồng Mỹ	23	1,72 m	Đồng Nai	
