= Project Runway Vietnam =

Vietnamese reality television series

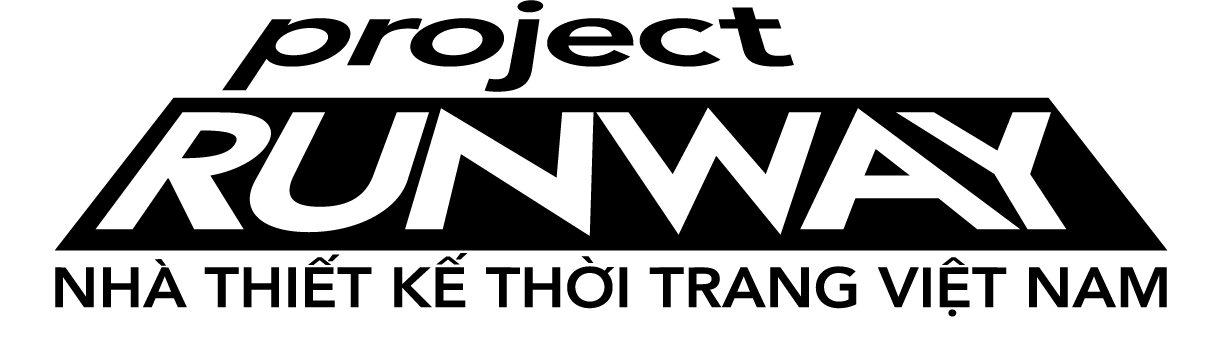
- Vietnamese: Nhà thiết kế thời trang Việt Nam
- Created by: Eli Holzman
- Starring: Ngô Thanh Vân (2013); Đỗ Mạnh Cường (2013); Chloe Dao (2013); Trương Ngọc Ánh (2014-2015); Thiên Hương (2013-2015); Công Trí (2014-2015)
- Country of origin: Vietnam
- Original language: Vietnamese
- No. of seasons: 3
- No. of episodes: 24

Production
- Executive producers: Lê Thị Quỳnh; Ryan Hoang Hubris (Season 1)
- Running time: 60 minutes

Original release
- Network: VTV3
- Release: April 28, 2013 – January 30, 2016

Project Runway Vietnam is a reality television program in Vietnam for training search and designer fashion by Multimedia company JSC, copyright holder and producer.

== Seasons ==
Season	Premiere date	No. of Designers	Winner	Runner-up	Designer Prizes	Model Prizes	International destination
1	April 28, 2013	12	Hoàng Minh Hà	Châu Chấn Hưng	A contract with CANIFA; An 8-page editorial feature in Harper's Bazaar Vietnam; A cash prize of 500,000,000₫ from CANIFA & Harper's Bazaar Vietnam	A 1-year supply of Maybelline cosmetics worth 100,000,000₫.	(France); Paris
2	May 11, 2014	12	Lý Giám Tiền	Hà Thị Hồng Lam	A scholarship with Atelier Chardon Savard; A contract with CANIFA; An editorial feature in Harper's Bazaar Vietnam; Will present the collection in New York Couture Fashion Week 2014; Will present the collection in Vietnam International Fashion Week 2014; A Ceturyon membership from California Fitness & Yoga Center in 1-years; A cash prize of 200,000,000₫ from Nokia Vietnam; A cash prize of 500,000,000₫ from CANIFA & Harper's Bazaar Vietnam; A brand new Vespa Sprint	Will be walking for the winner's collection in New York Couture Fashion Week 2014	(South Korea); Seoul (France); Paris
3	December 19, 2015	14	Nguyễn Tuyến Truyển	Trần Hùng	A scholarship with Atelier Chardon Savard; A 2-year contract with a fashion brand worth 300,000,000₫; Will present the collection in Vietnam International Fashion Week 2016	None	(Japan); Tokyo

== Season 1 ==
The preliminary program was held attwo2 areas of Hanoi and Ho Chi Minh City in mid-March 2013. Episode first aired at 20h on Sunday evening VTV3, starting from April 28, 2013. Top 3 of Project Runway Vietnam 2013 were taken to Paris by Harper's Bazaar.

=== Designer ===
Contestants	Age	Hometown	Place finished
Vũ Tùng Lâm	26	Ninh Bình	12th
Nguyễn Thị Trúc Phương	23	Cà Mau	11th
Lương Bá Tùng	42	San Francisco	9th/10th
Phạm Hoàng Minh	26	Vĩnh Long	9th/10th
Nguyễn Thị Diễm My	23	Long An	8th
Đặng Hải Yến	24	Thái Nguyên	7th
Vũ Tiến Mạnh	24	Hanoi	6th
Võ Hoàng Như Lan	24	Đồng Nai	4th/5th
Ngô Thái Bảo Loan	23	Bắc Ninh	4th/5th
Lâm Gia Khang	23	Ho Chi Minh City	3rd
Châu Chấn Hưng	30	Ho Chi Minh City	2nd
Hoàng Minh Hà	28	Đắk Lắk	Winner

(Ages listed are the designers' ages at the time the show was taped in spring 2013.)

=== Models ===
The model winner received 100 million VND from Maybelline. 12 models:

- Hồng Nhung (eliminated - 12th)
- Phương Thảo (eliminated - 11th) prior Vietnam's Next Top Model (cycle 4)
- Minh Thi (eliminated - 9/10th) semi-finalist from Vietnam's Next Top Model (cycle 3)
- Thanh Thảo (eliminated - 9/10th) from Vietnam's Next Top Model (cycle 3)
- Kate (Eliminated - 8th)
- Linh Ngân (eliminated - 6/7th) semi-finalist from Vietnam's Next Top Model (cycle 3)
- Lê Phương (Eliminated - 6/7th) from Vietnam's Next Top Model (cycle 2)
- Ngọc Thúy (Eliminated - 4/5th) from Vietnam's Next Top Model (cycle 3)
- Đỗ Hà (Eliminated - 4/5th) from Vietnam's Next Top Model (cycle 3)
- Nhã Trúc (Eliminated - 3rd) from Vietnam's Next Top Model (cycle 3)
- Lam Giang (Eliminated - 2nd)
- Lệ Quyên (Winner) prior Hoa khôi áo dài / Miss World Vietnam 2014

=== Challenge ===
Designer Elimination Chart
Designer	1	2	3	4	5	6	7	8	Elimination Episodes
Minh Hà	HIGH	HIGH	IN	HIGH	LOW	WIN	WIN	WINNER	8 - Memories of Paris
Chấn Hưng	WIN	LOW	WIN	IN	HIGH	LOW	HIGH	OUT	8 - Memories of Paris
Gia Khang	HIGH	IN	IN	LOW	WIN	LOW	HIGH	OUT	8 - Memories of Paris
Bảo Loan	IN	LOW	IN	HIGH	HIGH	HIGH	OUT		7 - Design the dress for Trương Ngọc Ánh for her event in Harper Bazaar's celemonies
Như Lan	IN	WIN	IN	IN	IN	HIGH	OUT		7 - Design the dress for Trương Ngọc Ánh for her event in Harper Bazaar's celemonies
Tiến Mạnh	IN	HIGH	IN	LOW	LOW	OUT			7 - Fall/ Winter Design for Model, Mother, and Children; 6 - Design for Competitor & Design on Nokia Lumia 930 color
Hải Yến	IN	IN	IN	WIN	OUT				7 - Fall/ Winter Design for Model, Mother, and Children; 6 - Design for Competitor & Design on Nokia Lumia 930 color
Diễm My	LOW	IN	LOW	OUT					5 - Fashion Sports Couture
Hoàng Minh	LOW	IN	OUT						4 - Mini-collection for Canifa
Bá Tùng	IN	IN	OUT						4 - Mini-collection for Canifa
Trúc Phương	IN	OUT							3 - Design Based on Inspiration from Soldier
Tùng Lâm	OUT								2 - Furniture & Pool's Materials Outfits

Results
Green background and WINNER means the designer won Project Runway Vietnam.
Blue background and WIN means the designer won that challenge.
Turquoise background and HIGH means the designer came in second but did not win the challenge.
Light blue background and HIGH means the designer had one of the highest scores for that challenge, but did not win.
Pink background and LOW means the designer had one of the lowest scores for that challenge, but was not eliminated.
Orange background and LOW means the designer was in the bottom two, but was not eliminated;
Red background and OUT means the designer lost and was out of the competition.

Model Elimination Table
Model	1	2	3	4	5	6^{1}	7	8
Lệ Quyên	TM	TM	TM	TM	GK	GK	MH	MH
Lam Giang	CH	CH	CH	CH	CH	CH	CH	CH
Nhã Trúc	GK	GK	HM	GK	NL	NL	GK	GK
Đỗ Hà	TL	BL	BL	BL	BL	BL	BL^{2}	
Ngọc Thúy	NL	NL	NL	NL	MH	MH	NL^{2}	
Lê Phương	MH	MH	MH	MH	TM	TM	OUT	
Linh Ngân	HY	HY	HY	HY	NP	OUT		
Kate	DM	DM	DM	DM	OUT			
Thanh Thảo	BL	HM	GK	OUT				
Minh Thi	BT	BT	BT	OUT				
Phương Thảo	TP	TP	OUT					
Hồng Nhung	HM	OUT						

^1: The models were not used in episode 6.
^2: Both designers and their models were eliminated at the end of episode.

The model won Project Runway Vietnam.
The model wore the winning design that challenge.
The model wore the losing design that challenge.
The model was eliminated.

Designer Legend

- Minh Hà: MH
- Chấn Hưng: CH
- Gia Khang: GK
- Bảo Loan: BL
- Như Lan: NL
- Tiến Mạnh: TM
- Hải Yến: HY
- Diễm My: DM
- Hoàng Minh: HM
- Bá Tùng: BT
- Trúc Phương: TP
- Tùng Lâm: TL

== Season 2 ==
Vietnam 2014 Project Runway is back with a whole new look. Preliminary program will be held at 2 areas of Hanoi and Ho Chi Minh City in mid-March 2014. Episode first aired at 20h on Sunday evening VTV3, starting from May 11, 2014.

The winner of this season of Project Runway Vietnam received an editorial feature in an issue of Harper's Bazaar magazine with 200,000,000 ₫, a scholarship from Atelier Chardon Savard, a cash prize of 300,000,000 ₫ from Canifa and joining with the design team of Canifa. a cash prize of 200,000,000 ₫ from Nokia Vietnam, a 450,000,000 ₫ 1 years Ceturyon member ship from California Fitness.

Top 3 of Project Runway Vietnam 2014 will be taking to Paris by Harper's Bazaar and the Top 5 will be taking to Seoul with Elise.

=== Designer ===
Contestants	Age	Hometown	Place Finished
Nguyễn Thị Lan Anh	22	Đắk Lắk	12th
Phạm Đặng Khánh	22	Quảng Ninh	11th
Lê Đình Chiến	25	Ho Chi Minh City	9th/10th
Nguyễn Thị Thảo	24	Thanh Hóa	9th/10th
Đặng Tuấn Vũ	23	Long An	8th
Tô Phan Diệu Linh	19	Hanoi	6th/7th
Nguyễn Hoàng Nguyên Phong	24	Ho Chi Minh City	6th/7th
Doãn Thùy Nga	26	Hưng Yên	4th/5th
Nguyễn Minh Công	20	Vĩnh Long	4th/5th
Phan Nguyễn Minh Quân	31	Ho Chi Minh City	3rd
Hà Thị Hồng Lam	25	Cà Mau	2nd
Lý Giám Tiền	18	Ho Chi Minh City	Winner

(ages listed are the designers' ages at the time the show was taped in the summer of 2014.)

=== Model ===
12 model will battle to catwalk on New York Couture Fashion Week are:

- Kim Thoa (Eliminated - 12th) from Vietnam's Next Top Model (cycle 4)
- Lý Mỹ Dinh (Eliminated - 11th)
- Văn Kiên (Eliminated - 9/10th) from Vietnam's Next Top Model (cycle 4)
- Phạm Công Toàn (Eliminated - 9/10th) prior Vietnam's Next Top Model (cycle 5)
- Tùng Anh (Eliminated - 8th)
- Nguyễn Quyên (Eliminated - 6/7th)
- Quang Đại (Eliminated - 6/7th) from Vietnam's Next Top Model (cycle 4)
- Cao Ngân (Eliminated - 4/5th) prior Vietnam's Next Top Model (cycle 5)
- Nguyễn Thanh (Eliminated - 4/5th) from Vietnam's Next Top Model (cycle 4)
- Thúy Hạnh (Eliminated - 3rd)
- Anh Thư (Eliminated - 2nd) prior Hoa khôi Áo dài / Miss World Vietnam 2014
- Chế Nguyễn Quỳnh Châu (Winner) prior Vietnam's Next Top Model (cycle 5)

=== Challenge ===
Designer Elimination Chart
Designer	2	3	4^{1}	5	6	7	8	9	Elimination Episodes
Giám Tiền	WIN	WIN	HIGH	HIGH	HIGH	HIGH	WIN	WINNER	9 - Memories of Paris
Hồng Lam	IN	IN	IN	WIN	LOW	LOW	HIGH	OUT	9 - Memories of Paris
Minh Quân	IN	HIGH	HIGH	HIGH	WIN	WIN	HIGH	OUT	9 - Memories of Paris
Minh Công	IN	IN	LOW	IN	HIGH	HIGH	OUT		8 - Modernized 1960's
Thùy Nga	IN	IN	IN	LOW	LOW	LOW^{3}	OUT		8 - Modernized 1960's
Nguyên Phong	HIGH	IN	IN	LOW^{2}	IN	OUT			7 - Fall/ Winter Design for Model, Mother, and Children; 6 - Design for Competitor & Design on Nokia Lumia 930 color
Diệu Linh	IN	HIGH	WIN	IN	LOW	OUT			7 - Fall/ Winter Design for Model, Mother, and Children; 6 - Design for Competitor & Design on Nokia Lumia 930 color
Tuấn Vũ	LOW	LOW	IN	OUT					5 - Fashion Sports Couture
Đình Chiến	LOW	IN	OUT						4 - Mini-collection for Canifa
Nguyễn Thảo	HIGH	LOW	OUT						4 - Mini-collection for Canifa
Đặng Khánh	IN	OUT							3 - Design Based on Inspiration from Soldier
Lan Anh	OUT								2 - Furniture & Pool's Materials Outfits

^1: Initially, Tien won the second challenge while Linh and Quan came in second and third respectively. However, in the following episode, he was accused of cheating by his fellow competitors because they believed he used his own money purchase extra materials, which wasn't allowed in this competition. Despite host Truong Ngoc Anh said his work was deserved to win, but due to his regulatory violation, she stripped off his triumph and passed the challenged award to Linh.
^2: Phong originally was appreciated by judge with the best creative design but he was accused of copying Balenciaga design in a Harper's Bazaar magazine and was in bottom two with Vu.
^3: At first Thuy Nga was originally eliminated with fellow competitors Nguyen Phong and Dieu Linh. However due to guest judge, Luu Nga's kindness, Thuy Nga was given an opportunity to travel with the group to Korea. This led to tension between the other judges but, they reluctantly allowed Thuy Nga to continue the competition and therefore saving Thuy Nga from elimination.
Results
Green background and WINNER means the designer won Project Runway Vietnam.
Blue background and WIN means the designer won that challenge.
Turquoise background and HIGH means the designer came in second but did not win the challenge.
Light blue background and HIGH means the designer had one of the highest scores for that challenge, but did not win.
Pink background and LOW means the designer had one of the lowest scores for that challenge, but was not eliminated.
Orange background and LOW means the designer was in the bottom two, but was not eliminated;
Red background and OUT means the designer lost and was out of the competition.

Model Elimination Table
Model	2	3^{1}	4	5	6	7	8^{2}		9
Quỳnh Châu	GT	GT	GT	HL	HL	TN	TN	GT	GT
Anh Thư	HL	TN	TN	MQ	TN	MQ	MQ	HL	HL
Thúy Hạnh	TV	NT	NT	DL	MC	MC	MC	MQ	MQ
Nguyễn Thanh	DL	DL	MQ	MC	DL	HL	GT	OUT	
Cao Ngân	NP	MQ	TV	TV	GT	GT	HL	OUT	
Quang Đại	MQ	TV	DL	GT	MQ	DL	OUT		
Nguyễn Quyên	NT	ĐC	HL	NP	NP	NP	OUT		
Tùng Anh	TN	ĐK	NP	TN	OUT				
Toàn Phạm	ĐC	NP	ĐC	OUT					
Văn Kiên	LA	MC	MC	OUT					
Mỹ Dinh	ĐK	HL	OUT						
Kim Thoa	MC	OUT							

^1: Due to Tien's regulatory violation, Linh inherited the award. Thus, Nguyen Thanh is a model who wore the winning design challenge.
^2: After revealed Top 3 designers, they had to choose one model, who became their vedette in the final show.

The model won Project Runway Vietnam.
The model wore the winning design that challenge.
The model wore the losing design that challenge.
The model was eliminated.

Designer Legend

- Giám Tiền: GT
- Hồng Lam: HL
- Minh Quân: MQ
- Minh Công: MC
- Thùy Nga: TN
- Diệu Linh: DL
- Nguyên Phong: NP
- Tuấn Vũ: TV
- Đình Chiến: ĐC
- Nguyễn Thảo: NT
- Đặng Khánh: ĐK
- Lan Anh: LA

== Season 3 ==
Third season was hashtag: #passionwins (mean #songvoidamme)

=== Designer ===
Contestants	Age	Hometown	Place Finished
Lê Thị Trang	24	Hai Phong	13th/14th
Lê Thị Huyền Trang	25	Thanh Hoa	13th/14th
Phạm Anh Dũng	22	Hanoi	12th
Nguyễn Hải Yến	23	Hanoi	10th/11th
Lê Văn Thảo	23	Binh Phuoc	10th/11th
Phan Quốc An	25	Ho Chi Minh City	7th-9th
Lê Thị Ngọc Bích	26	Đắk Lắk	7th-9th
Lê Minh Tuấn Phương	25	Tay Ninh	7th-9th
Lê Châu Kha	32	Ho Chi Minh City	4th-6th
Trần Nguyễn Anh Minh	25	Can Tho	4th-6th
Hà Thị Thông	28	Hanoi	4th-6th
Nguyễn Minh Giang Tú	23	Đắk Lắk	3rd
Trần Hùng	27	Yen Bai	2nd
Nguyễn Tuyến Truyển	22	Ho Chi Minh City	Winner

- Tiền Truyển celebrated his 22nd birthday in the filming week of episode 2.

(ages listed are the designers' ages at the time the show was taped in the spring of 20

=== Challenge ===
Designer Elimination Chart
Designer	1	2	3	4	5	6	7	Elimination Episodes
Tuyến Truyển	IN	WIN	IN	HIGH	WIN	LOW	WINNER	7 - Inspired of Asia
Trần Hùng	HIGH	HIGH	IN	HIGH	WIN	WIN	OUT	7 - Inspired of Asia
Giang Tú	WIN	HIGH	LOW	LOW	WIN	LOW	OUT	7 - Inspired of Asia
Châu Kha	IN	IN	IN	IN	HIGH	OUT		6 - Spring on homeland
Anh Minh	IN	LOW	WIN	IN	LOW	OUT		6 - Spring on homeland
Hà Thông	IN	IN	IN	LOW	LOW	OUT		6 - Spring on homeland
Quốc An	IN	IN	IN	IN	OUT			5 - Colours of Summer
Ngọc Bích	IN	IN	LOW	HIGH	OUT			5 - Colours of Summer
Tuấn Phương	HIGH	IN	IN	IN	OUT			5 - Colours of Summer
Hải Yến	HIGH	LOW	OUT					3 - All Stars - The story of the stars
Văn Thảo	HIGH	IN	OUT					3 - All Stars - The story of the stars
Anh Dũng	IN	OUT						2 - Fields after harvest
Lê Trang	OUT							1 - Fashion party
Huyền Trang	OUT							1 - Fashion party

In episode 4, Giang Tú would be eliminated, but Tùng Leo want to be stay for Giang Tú for another week. Next week, Giang Tú would be penalty 5-hours (25 hours remain), and the rest will be fully 30 hours.

Results
Green background and WINNER means the designer won Project Runway Vietnam.
Blue background and WIN means the designer won that challenge.
Turquoise background and HIGH means the designer came in second but did not win the challenge.
Light blue background and HIGH means the designer had one of the highest scores for that challenge, but did not win.
Pink background and LOW means the designer had one of the lowest scores for that challenge, but was not eliminated.
Orange background and LOW means the designer was in the bottom two, but was not eliminated;
Red background and OUT means the designer lost and was out of the competitionơ

Model Elimination Table
Episode	CK	GT	QA	NB	TT	HY	TP	VT	HT	AD	TH	AM
2	H'Hen Niê	Hoàng Oanh	Đào Thu	Nguyễn Hợp	Kiều Nga	Anh Thư	Lại Thanh Hhương	Hân Nguyễn	Hồng Xuân	Bảo Vy	Bích Trâm	Kim Phương
3	Tiêu Châu Như Quỳnh	Phạm Hồng Phước	Quang Bảo	Minh Thư	Thái Trinh	Vũ Cát Tường	S.T 365	Loki Bảo Long	Lý Bình	OUT	Thúc Lĩnh	Will 365
4	Kim Phương	Dương Thanh	Anh Thư	Kiều Ngân	Trúc Linh	OUT	Bảo Ngọc	OUT	Phương Trinh		Kim Chi	Thanh Tuyền
5	Anh Quân	Hương Ly	K'Brơi	Mâu Thủy	Ngọc Tình		Cao Ngân		Nguyễn Oanh		Thanh Tuyền	Kim Phương
6	Kikki Lê	Kim Nhung	OUT	OUT	Chà Mi		OUT		Quỳnh Chi		Hương Ly	Thanh Thủy
7	OUT								OUT			OUT

The model won Project Runway Vietnam.
The model wore the winning design that challenge.
The model wore the losing design that challenge.
The model was eliminated.

Designer Legend

- Châu Kha: CK
- Giang Tú: GT
- Quốc An: QA
- Ngọc Bích: NB
- Tuyến Truyển: TT
- Hải Yến: HY
- Tuấn Phương: TP
- Văn Thảo: VT
- Hà Thông: HT
- Anh Dũng: AD
- Trần Hùng: TH
- Anh Minh: AM
