= Miss Vietnam 2014 =

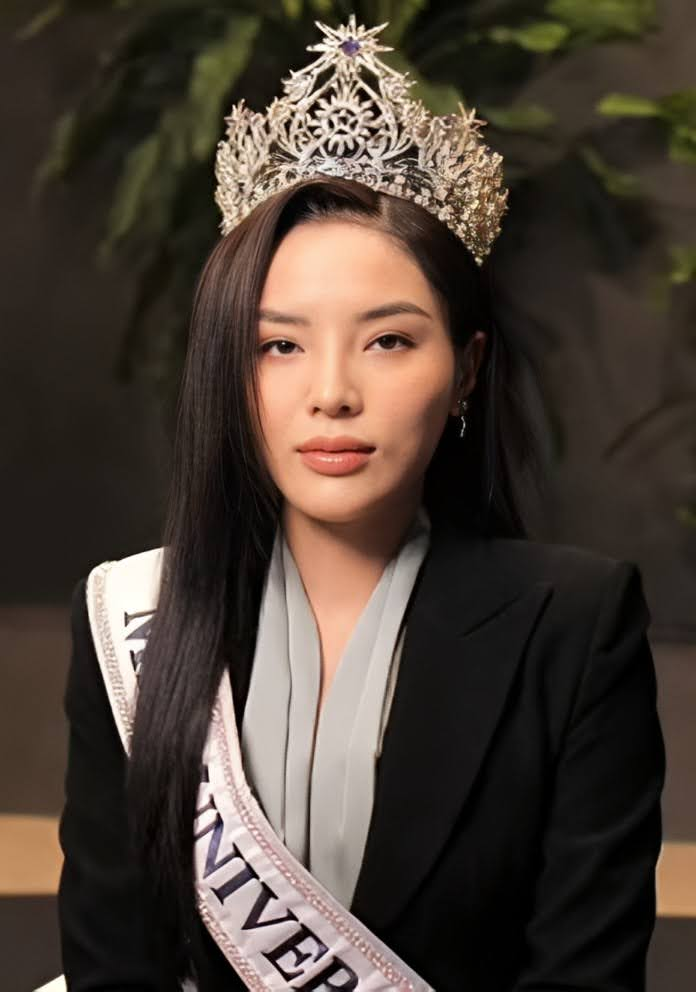
- Miss Vietnam 2014 Nguyễn Cao Kỳ Duyên
- Date: November 22, 2014
- Presenters: Jennifer Pham; Khắc Nguyện
- Venue: Vinpearl Land, Phú Quốc, Kiên Giang, Vietnam
- Broadcaster: VTV1
- Entrants: 40
- Placements: 10
- Winner: Nguyễn Cao Kỳ Duyên; Nam Định

Miss Vietnam 2014 (Vietnamese: Hoa hậu Việt Nam 2014) was the 14th edition of the Miss Vietnam pageant. It was held on November 22, 2014 at Vinpearl Land, Phú Quốc, Kiên Giang, Vietnam. Miss Vietnam 2012 Đặng Thu Thảo crowned her successor Nguyễn Cao Kỳ Duyên at the end of the event.

== Results ==
=== Placements ===
Final result	Contestant
Miss Vietnam 2014	283 – Nguyễn Cao Kỳ Duyên
1st Runner-Up	289 – Nguyễn Trần Huyền My
2nd Runner-Up	858 – Nguyễn Lâm Diễm Trang
Top 5	099 – Lã Thị Kiều Anh; 268 – Nguyễn Thanh Tú
Top 10	242 – Phạm Thị Hương; 491 – Nguyễn Huỳnh Trúc Mai; 716 – Trang Trần Diễm Quỳnh; 532 – Đỗ Thị Huệ; 680 – Nguyễn Thị Bảo Như

=== Special awards ===
Special Award	Contestant
Best Face	858 – Nguyễn Lâm Diễm Trang
Best Evening Gown	289 – Nguyễn Trần Huyền My
Best Skin	268 – Nguyễn Thanh Tú
Miss Beach	283 – Nguyễn Cao Kỳ Duyên
Miss Talent	099 – Lã Thị Kiều Anh
Best Hair	316 – Nguyễn Thị Hà
Miss Áo dài	491 – Nguyễn Huỳnh Trúc Mai
Miss Popular Vote	532 – Đỗ Thị Huệ

== Contestants ==
40 contestants in the final.

Contestants	No.
Võ Hồng Ngọc Huệ	291
Nguyễn Thị Như Ý	966
Bùi Thị Thu Trang	932
Võ Hoàng Phương Xuyến	988
Hoàng Bích Ngọc Ánh	086
Đổng Ánh Quỳnh	980
Nguyễn Lâm Diễm Trang	858
Nguyễn Ngọc Mai	718
Huỳnh Hồng Khai	318
Từ Cao Thanh Thủy	890
Tạ Thanh Huyền	595
Phạm Thị Mỹ Hạnh	399
Đỗ Thị Huệ	532
Đỗ Thùy Dương	138
Nguyễn Thị Bảo Như	680
Nguyễn Thị Hà Vy	986
Nguyễn Huỳnh Trúc Mai	491
Nguyễn Thụy Quỳnh Thư	883
Nguyễn Thị Phương Anh	095
Vũ Thu Thảo	923
Nguyễn Thị Thu Hà	395
Nguyễn Thanh Tú	268
Lã Thị Kiều Anh	099
H'Ăng Niê	626
Nguyễn Thị Lệ Nam Em	294
Phạm Thùy Trang	116
Lê Thị Ngân Hà	123
Nguyễn Thị Hà	316
Phạm Thị Ngọc Quý	789
Nguyễn Trần Huyền My	289
Tạ Hoàng Diễm Hương	393
Huỳnh Ý Nhi	615
Đỗ Trần Khánh Ngân	588
Trang Trần Diễm Quỳnh	716
Nguyễn Trần Khánh Vân	990
Nguyễn Thùy Linh	468
Nguyễn Cao Kỳ Duyên	283
Phạm Thị Hương	242
Phạm Mỹ Linh	494
Huỳnh Thị Thùy Vân	983
