= Phú Thọ Indoor Stadium =

Multi-purpose indoor arena in Ho Chin Minh City, Vietname

Coordinates: 10.769403°N 106.657804°E

Phú Thọ Arena
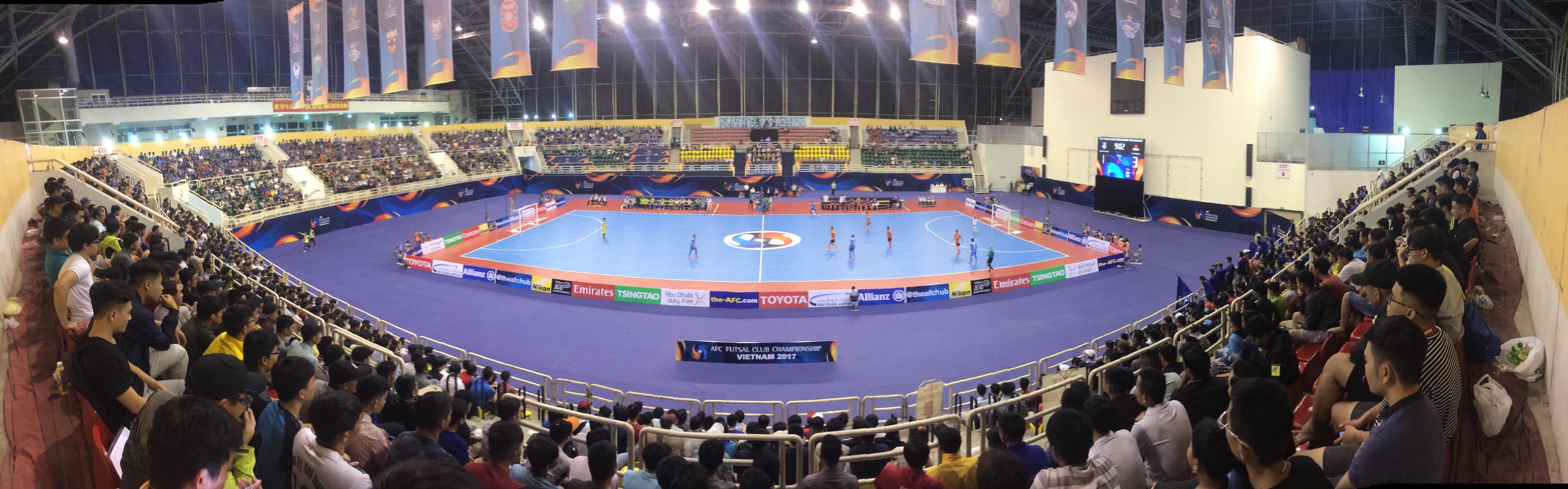
- Phú Thọ Arena during the 2017 AFC Futsal Club Championship
- Interactive map of Phú Thọ Arena
- Address: No.1 Lữ Gia Street, Phú Thọ, Ho Chi Minh City; Vietnam
- Location: Phú Thọ Horse Racing Ground Park, District 11, Ho Chi Minh City, Vietnam
- Owner: Ho Chi Minh City Department of Culture, Sports and Tourism
- Capacity: 5,000; Futsal: 3,300; Concert: 7,000
- Public transit: L1 L5 Phú Thọ station, University of Technology station (Line 5 only) (Proposed)

Construction
- Built: 24 December 2000
- Opened: 20 November 2003
- Cost: 119.4 billion VND ($5.9 million in 2001) (167.7 billion VND in 2014)

Tenants
- Vietnam national futsal team 2003 Southeast Asian Games; 2009 Asian Indoor Games

Phu Tho Arena or Phu Tho Indoor Stadium (Vietnamese: Nhà thi đấu Phú Thọ) is a multi-purpose indoor arena, located in District 11, Ho Chi Minh City, Vietnam, within walking distance from the 1932-built Phú Thọ Horse Racing Ground Park. The arena was constructed for 2003 Southeast Asian Games. Although not officially recognized, the arena is usually home to Vietnam national futsal team. It has a capacity of 5,000 people for sporting events and a full-house capacity of around 8,000.

== History ==
The arena was built in 2000 along with a practice venue. It was opened on November 20, 2003 and has served major sporting as well as entertainment and exhibition events.

Phú Thọ Arena has it first major renovation in 2025, and finished in 2026.

== Events ==
=== Sports events ===
Year	Date	Events
2003	December	2003 Southeast Asian Games taekwondo events
2005	May 22 — June 4	2005 AFC Futsal Championship
2009	June 8 — 14	2009 AFF Futsal Championship
2009	October 28 — November 7	2009 Asian Indoor Games men's futsal matches
2010	April 5 — 11	2010 AFF Futsal Championship
2012	May 9 — 11	2012 Asian Taekwondo Championships
2014	April 30 — May 10	2014 AFC Futsal Championship
2016	July 26 — 29	2016 Vocotruyen World Championship
2017	July 20 — 30	2017 AFC Futsal Club Championship
2017	October 26 — November 3	2017 AFF Futsal Championship
2018	May 26 — 28	2018 Asian Taekwondo Championships

=== Esports events ===
Year	Date	Events
2024	May 24 — 26	Free Fire World Series — Southeast Asia Spring 2024

=== Entertainment events ===
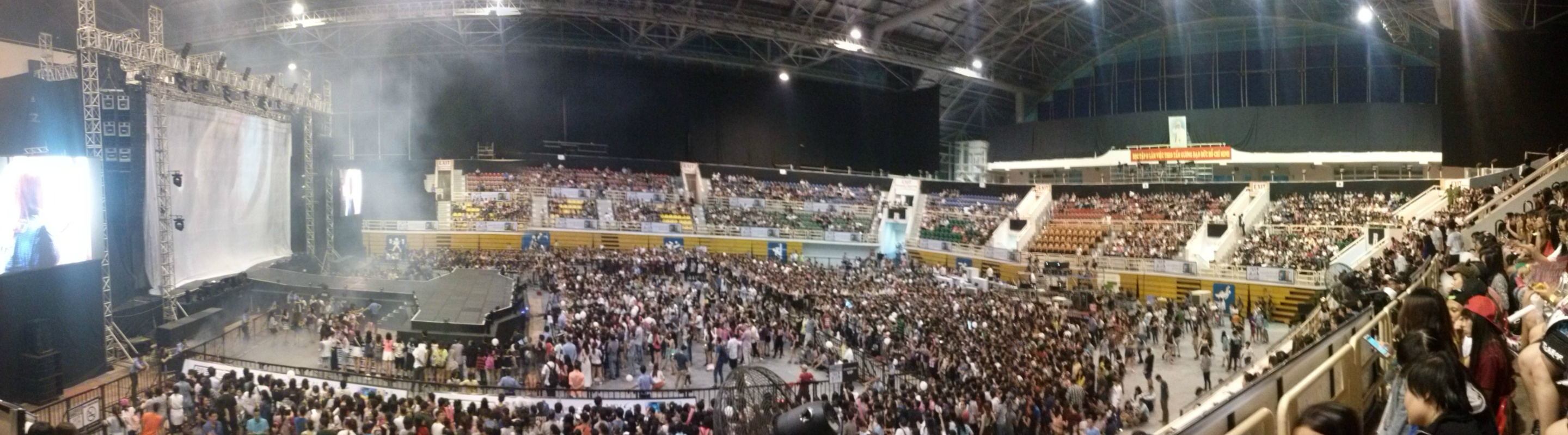
Phú Thọ Arena during the 2NE1 Galaxy Stage – All or Nothing World Tour

Year	Date	Events
2012	November 24	M LIVE MO.A 2012 in Vietnam (Wonder Girls, JJ Project, San E, Huh Gak, ZE:A)
2014	August 10	All or Nothing World Tour (2NE1)
2014	December 7	Saigon Comic Con
2016	February 24 — 28	Disney On Ice presents Magical Ice Festival
2016	August 28	Miss Vietnam 2016
2017	February 24 — 28	Disney On Ice presents The Wonderful of Disney On Ice
2018	September 16	Miss Vietnam 2018
2020	November 20	Miss Vietnam 2020
2022	January 11	Homecoming of Miss Grand International 2021 Nguyễn Thúc Thùy Tiên
2022	September 25	Miss Grand Vietnam 2022 — National Costume Show
2022	September 28	Miss Grand Vietnam 2022 — Preliminary Competition
2022	October 1	Miss Grand Vietnam 2022 — Grand Final
2022	November 19	The Masked Singer Vietnam season 1 — All-star Concert
2022	December 23	Miss Vietnam 2022
2023	August 19	Miss Grand Vietnam 2023 — National Costume Show
2023	August 23	Miss Grand Vietnam 2023 — Preliminary Competition
2023	August 27	Miss Grand Vietnam 2023 — Grand Final
2023	September 2	D&E World Tour Fancon — [DElight PARTY] in Ho Chi Minh City
2023	September 29	Vietnamese Concert (Hoàng Thùy Linh)
2023	October 20	Miss Grand International 2023 — National Costume Show
2023	October 22	Miss Grand International 2023 — Preliminary Competition
2023	October 25	Miss Grand International 2023 — Grand Final
2023	October 28	The Grand Concert Engfa Live in Vietnam (Engfa Waraha)
2024	April 6 — 7	Baekhyun Asia Tour — LONSDALEITE in Ho Chi Minh City
2024	June 28	Super Junior — SUPER SHOW SPIN-OFF: Halftime
2024	September 11	Miss Universe Vietnam 2024 — Preliminary Competition
2024	September 14	Miss Universe Vietnam 2024 — Grand Final
2024	November 17	Take Us To Your Heart Tour (Michael Learns to Rock)
2026	July 11	Trạm Sao 2 – Sao Concert – The Live Journey
2026	September 5	Miss World 2026

=== Exhibition events ===
Year	Date	Events
2023	December 12	Vietnam International Lift Expo 2023 — Opening Ceremony
