= Đỗ Mỹ Linh =

Vietnamese model

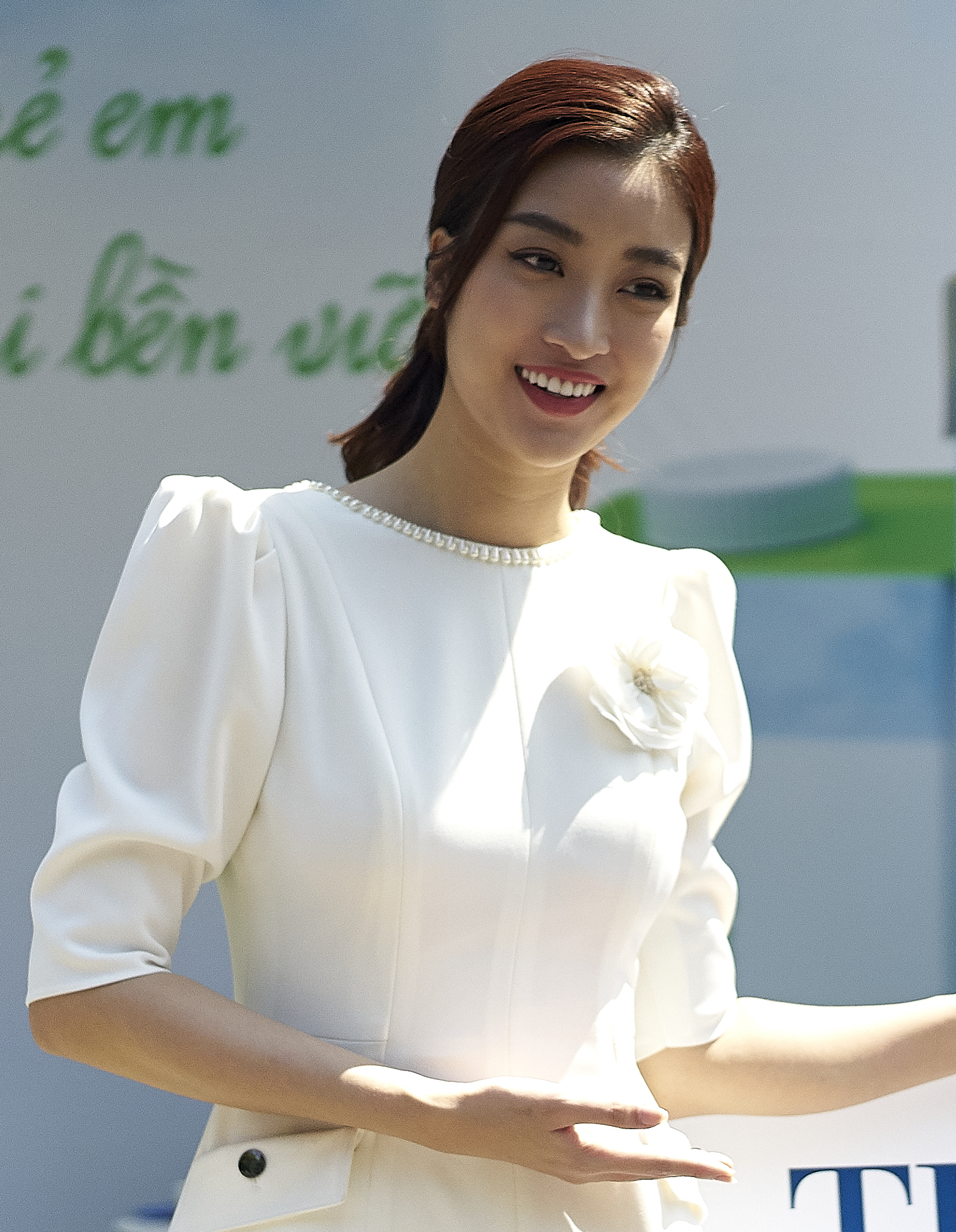
- Đỗ Mỹ Linh in 2019
- Born: Đỗ Mỹ Linh; 13 October 1996 (age 30); Hanoi, Vietnam
- Education: Foreign Trade University
- Beauty pageant titleholder
- Title: Miss Vietnam 2016
- Eye color: Black
- Major competitions: Miss Vietnam 2014 (Unplaced/Withdrew); Miss Universe Vietnam 2015 (Top 15); Miss Vietnam 2016 (Winner); Miss World 2017 (Top 40)

Đỗ Mỹ Linh (born 13 October 1996) is a Vietnamese model and beauty pageant titleholder who won Miss Vietnam 2016. She represented Vietnam at the Miss World 2017.

== Personal life ==
Linh was born in Hanoi. She is a student of Foreign Trade University. She is married to Đỗ Vinh Quang, who is the Chairman of Hanoi FC. The wedding took place on October 23, 2022.

== Pageantry ==
=== Miss Universe Vietnam 2015 ===
Linh competed in Miss Universe Vietnam 2015 and was placed in Top 15.

=== Miss Vietnam 2016 ===
Linh was crowned Miss Vietnam 2016. She was then appointed by Sen Vàng Entertainment and Elite - the national license holder to represent Vietnam at Miss World 2017 in China.

=== Miss World 2017 ===
Linh represented Vietnam at Miss World 2017 in Sanya, China and placed in the Top 40 thanks to winning the Head to Head challenge (Group 18). She became a semifinalist in the People's Choice and Multimedia competitions and was the first ever contestant from Vietnam to win the Beauty with a Purpose competition.

Awards and achievements
Preceded by (Indonesia) Natasha Mannuela Halim	Beauty with a Purpose; 2017	Succeeded by (Nepal) Shrinkhala Khatiwada
Preceded by Trương Thị Diệu Ngọc	Miss World Vietnam; 2017	Succeeded by Trần Tiểu Vy
Preceded by Nguyễn Cao Kỳ Duyên	Miss Vietnam; 2016	Succeeded by Trần Tiểu Vy
