= Kỳ Duyên =

Vietnamese model and beauty pageant titleholder

Nguyễn Cao Kỳ Duyên
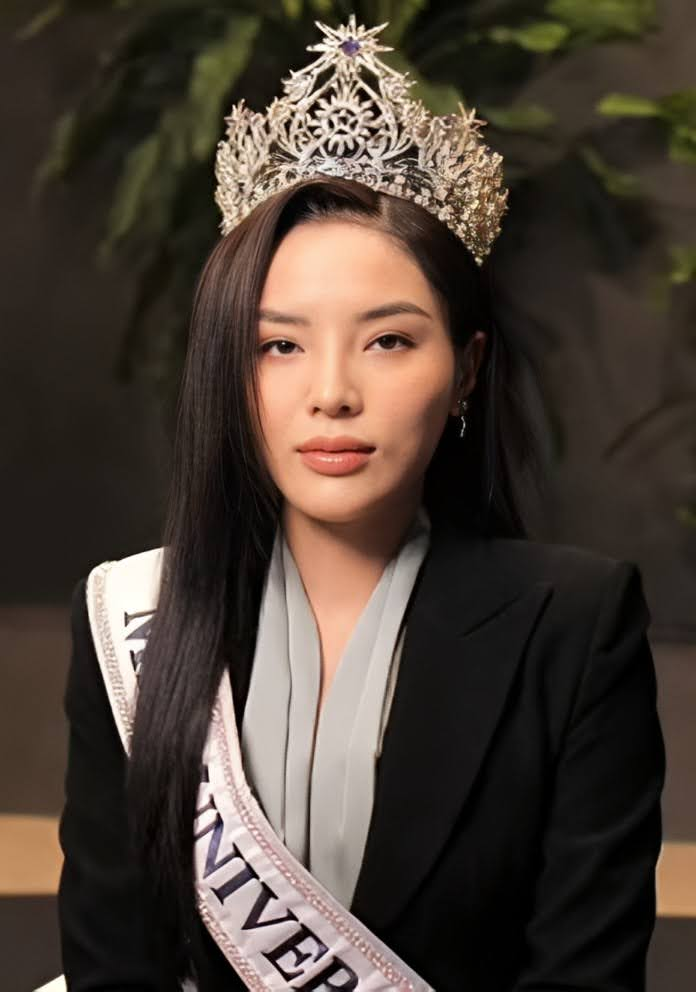
- Born: 13 November 1996 (age 30); Nam Định, Vietnam
- Education: Foreign Trade University
- Occupation: Model • Actor
- Beauty pageant titleholder
- Title: Miss Vietnam 2014; Miss Universe Vietnam 2024
- Years active: 2014–
- Major competitions: Miss Vietnam 2014 (Winner); Miss Universe Vietnam 2024 (Winner); Miss Universe 2024 (Top 30)

Signature
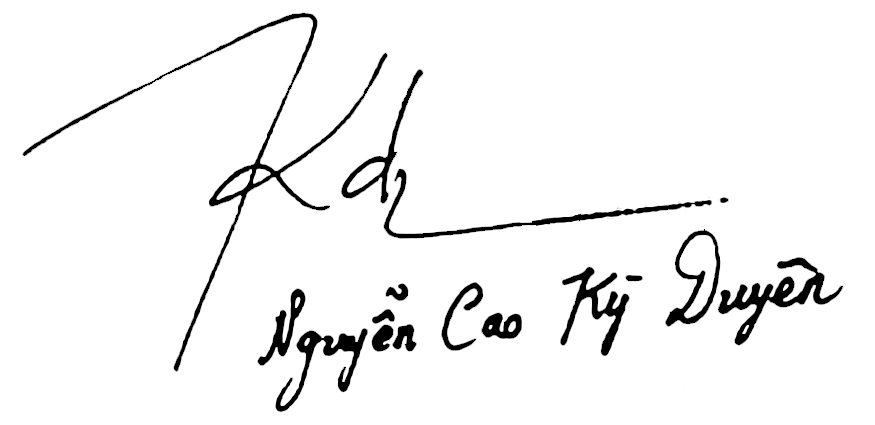

Nguyễn Cao Kỳ Duyên (born 13 November 1996) is a Vietnamese female model, actress and beauty pageant titleholder. She gained recognition after finishing as Miss Vietnam 2014 and Miss Universe Vietnam 2024. She represented her country at Miss Universe 2024 in Mexico City, Mexico on 14 November 2024.

== Personal life ==
Kỳ Duyên was born in Nam Định. She started learning French in fourth grade, later becoming a student in the French specialized class at Trần Đăng Ninh Middle School and later at Lê Hồng Phong High School for the Gifted, Nam Định. In 2014, she was admitted to the Foreign Trade University, Hanoi.

== Pageantry ==
When she first entered a beauty pageant, she was crowned Miss Vietnam 2014 on Phu Quoc Island, along with the Miss Beach award. In addition, she received high praise from the two runners-up, Diễm Trang and Huyền My, for her gentle beauty and high level of education.

Kỳ Duyên received an invitation to represent Vietnam in the Miss World 2014 and Miss Earth 2016 competition, but she declined due to various controversies at the time.

She participated in several fashion events, such as serving as a coach for The Look Vietnam 2017 and Vietnam Supermodel 2018. She was also invited to become a coach for Miss Fitness Vietnam 2022 and The Face Vietnam 2023. Additionally, she ventured into acting with her debut role in the film The 4 Rascals by Trấn Thành.

In 2024, Kỳ Duyên announced her registration to compete in Miss Universe Vietnam 2024, which attracted media attention. She won the title and became the first to win both Miss Vietnam 2014 and Miss Universe Vietnam 2024.

As Miss Universe Vietnam 2024, Kỳ Duyên represented the country at Miss Universe 2024, held on 16 November in Mexico City, Mexico, where she placed in the Top 30.

== Television ==
Year	Title	Role	Notes
2017	The Look Vietnam 2017	Mentor	Mentor of team winner
2018	Vietnam Supermodel 2018	Mentor	
2019	The Amazing Race Vietnam 2019	Main cast	Finished fourth
2020	Star Enlisted: Vietnam (seasons 11)	Main cast	Winner
2022	KOC Vietnam 2022	Mentor	
2023	The Face Vietnam season 4	Mentor	
2023	KOC Vietnam 2023	Host	
2025	Star Enlisted: Vietnam (seasons 16)	Main cast	

=== Beauty contests ===
Year	Title	Role	Notes
2014	Miss Vietnam 2014	Candidate	Winner
2024	Miss Universe Vietnam 2024	Candidate	Winner
2024	Miss Universe 2024	Candidate	Top 30

== Filmography ==
- The 4 Rascals (2025)
- Sister sister 3 (2026)

== Achievements ==
Year	Prize	Category	Nominated works	Result	Note
2014	Miss Vietnam	Miss Beach	Kỳ Duyên	Won	
2018	Star of the Year 2018's Award by Ngôi Sao newspaper	Fashion Star	Kỳ Duyên	Won	
2024	WeChoice Awards 2024	Inspirational figures	Kỳ Duyên	Nominated	
2024	Star of the Year 2024's Award by VnExpress newspaper	Beauty of the year	Kỳ Duyên	Won	
2025	ELLE Beauty Awards 2025	Best Body of the year	Kỳ Duyên	Won	
2025	24th Vietnam Film Festival	Gold Lotus Award for Best Supporting Actress	Kỳ Duyên	Nominated	
2025	Golden Kites Awards 2025	Golden Kite Award for Best Supporting Actress in a Feature Film	Kỳ Duyên	Nominated	
2025	LUXUO Asia Awards 2025	Influential Individual of the Year	Kỳ Duyên	Won	

Awards and achievements
Preceded by Đặng Thu Thảo	Miss Vietnam; 2014	Succeeded by Đỗ Mỹ Linh
Preceded by (El Salvador) Isabella García-Manzo	3rd Placed Best National Costume Miss Universe; 2024	Succeeded by Incumbent
Preceded by Bùi Quỳnh Hoa	Miss Universe Vietnam; 2024	Succeeded by Nguyễn Hương Giang
