= Phú Thọ, Ho Chi Minh City =

Phú Thọ Phường Phú Thọ
- Ward
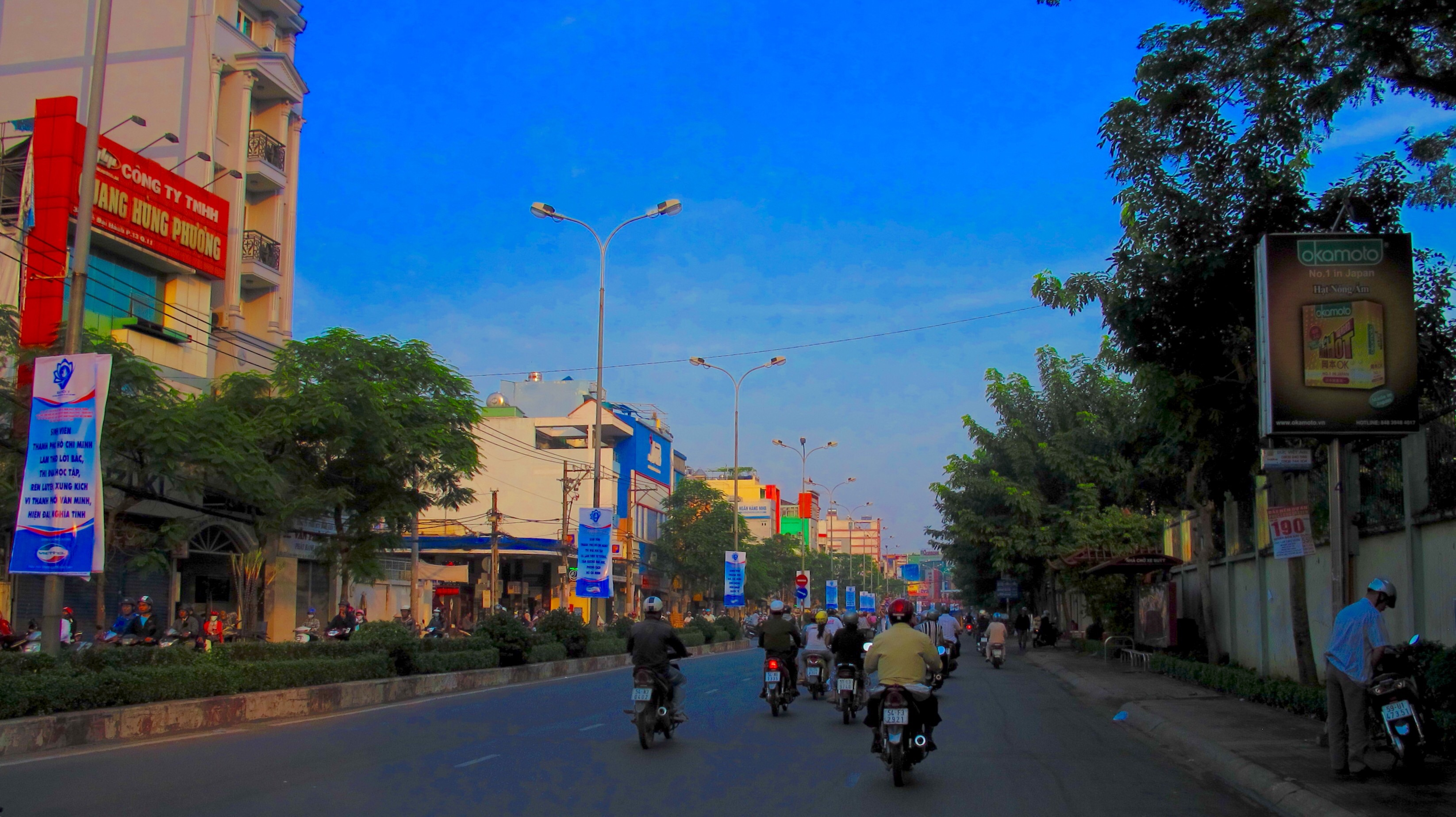
- A road in Phú Thọ
- Interactive map of Phú Thọ
- Coordinates: 10°46′01″N 106°39′16″E
- Country: Vietnam
- Municipality: Ho Chi Minh City
- Established: June 16, 2025

Area
  - Total: 0.53 sq mi (1.37 km^{2})

Population (2024)
  - Total: 65,369
  - Density: 124,000/sq mi (47,700/km^{2})
- Time zone: UTC+07:00 (Indochina Time)
- Administrative code: 27226

Phú Thọ (Vietnamese: Phường Phú Thọ) is a ward of Ho Chi Minh City, Vietnam. It is one of the 168 new wards, communes and special zones of the city following the reorganization in 2025.

== History ==
On June 16, 2025, the National Assembly Standing Committee issued Resolution No. 1685/NQ-UBTVQH15 on the arrangement of commune-level administrative units of Ho Chi Minh City in 2025 (effective from June 16, 2025). Accordingly, the entire land area and population of Ward 11, Ward 15 and part of Ward 8 of the former District 11 will be integrated into a new ward named Phú Thọ (Clause 31, Article 1).
