= Miss International Queen Vietnam 2020 =

Transgender beauty pageant in Vietnam

- Date: January 16, 2021
- Presenters: Vũ Mạnh Cường; Thùy Dung
- Entertainment: Đỗ Nhật Hà; Thảo Trang; Ali Hoàng Dương; Nguyễn Hồng Nhung
- Venue: Studio BHD, Ho Chi Minh City, Vietnam
- Entrants: 15
- Placements: 9
- Winner: Phùng Trương Trân Đài; California

Miss International Vietnam 2020 is the second edition of Miss International Queen Vietnam pageant. The finale was held on January 16, 2021, at Studio BHD, Ho Chi Minh City, Vietnam.

Miss International Queen Vietnam 2018 Đỗ Nhật Hà from Ho Chi Minh City handed over the crown to her successor Phùng Trương Trân Đài from California.

Xuân Lan, Võ Hoàng Yến, Lâm Khánh Chi, Nguyễn Hồng Nhung, Dương Ngọc Trinh, Trần Thanh Hải, Huỳnh Minh Thảo, Nguyễn Hương Giang, Dược Sĩ Tiến were the judges for the competition.

Miss Supranational Vietnam 2018 Nguyễn Minh Tú, Miss Universe Vietnam 2019 Hoàng Thùy and Miss Grand Vietnam 2019 Lona Kiều Loan were the mentors for the competitors.

== Results ==
Placement	Candidate	International beauty pageant
Miss International Queen Vietnam 2023	031 - Phùng Trương Trân Đài (¥)	Top 06 – Miss International Queen 2022
1st runner-up	051 - Lương Mỹ Kỳ	2nd Runner-up – Miss Fabulous International 2023
2nd runner-up	055 - Nguyễn Phạm Tường Vi
Top 6	015 - Mộng Thường; 005 - Cadie Huỳnh Anh; 044 - Nguyễn Khánh An
Top 9	023 - Vũ Thu Phương (§); 007 - Nguyễn Đại Dương (§)
Top 9	025 - Bolo Nguyễn (§)	Winner – Miss Equality World 2024
The remaining candidates	011 - Trần Ngọc Sang; 012 - Châu Kim Sang †; 001 - Cao Lê Diên; 041 - Lê Tiêu Linh
The remaining candidates	003 - Đỗ Tây Hà	4th Runner-Up – Miss Equality World 2023
The remaining candidates	009 - Nguyễn Tường Danh	Unplaced – Miss Equality World 2022
