= Miss International Queen Vietnam =

Transgender beauty pageant in Vietnam

- Formation: March 30, 2018; 8 years ago
- Founders: Nguyễn Hương Giang
- Type: Reality show
- Headquarters: Ho Chi Minh City
- Location: Vietnam
- Members: Miss International Queen
- Official language: Vietnamese
- Website: Official Facebook website

Miss International Queen Vietnam (Vietnamese: Đại sứ Hoàn Mỹ) is a reality television in Vietnam for transgender women. The winner will represent Vietnam in Miss International Queen.

The current Miss International Queen Vietnam is Hà Tâm Như from Vĩnh Long, who won at the latest pageant held on May 10, 2025.

The show framework is based on The Face Vietnam. Accordingly, the competition has coaches and qualifying rounds. Miss International Queen Vietnam contest is also the largest national-level of Miss International Queen pageant.

== Titleholders ==
| Year | Miss Internarional Queen Vietnam | 1st Runner up | 2nd Runner up | Number of contestants |
|---|---|---|---|---|
| 2025 | Hà Tâm Như (Vĩnh Long) | Nguyễn Cao Minh Anh (Hà Nội) | Nguyễn Thủy Tiên (Hải Dương) | 14 |
| 2023 | Nguyễn Hà Dịu Thảo (Hải Dương) | Nguyễn Tường San (Khánh Hoà) | Nguyễn An Nhi (Vĩnh Long) | 20 |
| 2020 | Phùng Trương Trân Đài (California) | Lương Mỹ Kỳ (Tiền Giang) | Nguyễn Phạm Tường Vi (Đắk Nông) | 15 |
| 2018 | Đỗ Nhật Hà (Ho Chi Minh City) | Nguyễn Phương Vy (Ho Chi Minh City) | Bùi Đình Hoài Sa (An Giang) | 16 |

=== Winner ===
| Area | Numbers | Year(s) |
|---|---|---|
| Vĩnh Long | 1 | 2025 |
| Hải Dương | 1 | 2023 |
| California | 1 | 2020 |
| Ho Chi Minh City | 1 | 2018 |

== Miss International Queen ==
Color key

- Declared as Winner
- Ended as Runner-Up
- Ended as one of the finalists or semi-finalists

| Year | Representative | Residence | National title | Placement | Special Awards |
|---|---|---|---|---|---|
| 2025 | Hà Tâm Như | Vĩnh Long | Miss International Queen Vietnam 2025 | 2nd Runner-Up | 1 Special Awards: 2nd Runner-Up Best Talent |
| 2024 | Nguyễn Tường San | Khánh Hòa | Appointed: (1st Runner-Up Miss International Queen Vietnam 2023) | 2nd Runner-Up | 5 Special Awards: Preliminary Best Performance; Best National Costume; Miss Photogenic; Miss Perfect Skin; 2nd Runner-Up Best Talent |
| 2023 | Nguyễn Hà Dịu Thảo | Hải Dương | Miss International Queen Vietnam 2023 | Top 11 | 3 Special Awards: Wonder Woman Award; Best National Costume; Miss Popular Vote |
| 2023 | Lương Mỹ Kỳ | Tiền Giang | Appointed: (1st Runner-up Miss International Queen Vietnam 2020) | Did not compete | |
| 2022 | Phùng Trương Trân Đài | California | Miss International Queen Vietnam 2020 | Top 6 | 1 Special Awards: Best in Talent |
| 2020 | Bùi Đình Hoài Sa | An Giang | Appointed: (2nd Runner-up Miss International Queen Vietnam 2018) | Top 12 | 2 Special Awards: Most Popular Introductory Video; 1st Runner-Up Best in Talent |
| 2020 | Nguyễn Phương Vy | Ho Chi Minh City | Appointed: (1st Runner-up Miss International Queen Vietnam 2018) | Did not compete | |
| 2019 | Đỗ Nhật Hà | Ho Chi Minh City | Miss International Queen Vietnam 2018 | Top 6 | 3 Special Awards: Most Popular Introductory Video; Top 05 – Best in Evening Gown; Top 12 – Best in Talent |
| 2018 | Nguyễn Hương Giang | Hanoi | —N/a | Winner | 2 Special Awards: Best in Talent; Most Popular Introductory Video |
| 2016 | Bella Lê Ngọc Mai | Ho Chi Minh City | —N/a | Did not compete | |
| 2014 | Angelina May Nguyen | Ho Chi Minh City | —N/a | Unplaced | |

== See also ==
- Miss Universe Vietnam
- Miss World Vietnam
- Miss Earth Vietnam
- Miss Grand Vietnam
- Miss Supranational Vietnam
- Miss Vietnamese World
- List of Vietnam representatives at international women beauty pageants
