= Hương Giang =

Vietnamese singer and beauty pageant titleholder

Nguyễn Hương Giang
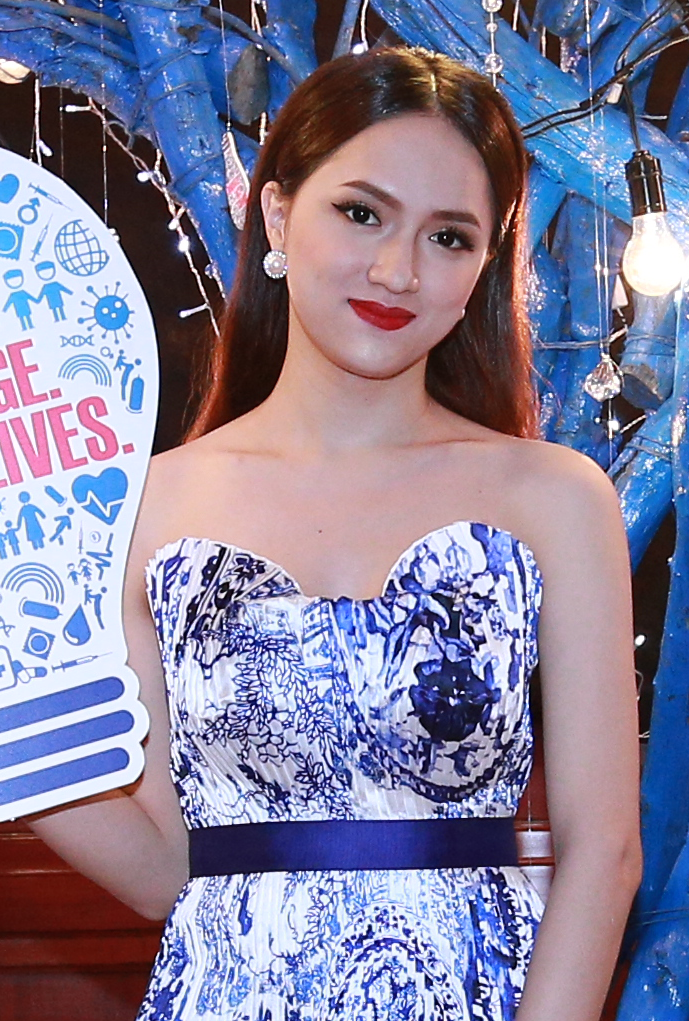
- Huong Giang in 2015
- Born: 29 December 1991 (age 34); Hanoi, Vietnam
- Other name: Huong Giang Idol
- Occupations: Singer; model; TV Personality; entrepreneur
- Known for: Vietnam Idol season 4 (4th place); Miss International Queen Vietnam (As producer and judge)
- Beauty pageant titleholder
- Title: Miss International Queen 2018; Miss Universe Vietnam 2025
- Major competitions: Miss International Queen 2018; (Winner); Miss Universe 2025; (Unplaced); MGI All Stars 1st Edition; (2nd Runner-Up)
- Website: hgstargroup.com

Nguyễn Hương Giang (born 29 December 1991) is a prominent Vietnamese transgender woman, singer and beauty pageant titleholder. In March 2018, she won Miss International Queen 2018 in Pattaya, Thailand. As Miss Universe Vietnam 2025, she represented Vietnam at Miss Universe 2025 in Thailand.

== Early life ==
Huong Giang was born in Hanoi and was assigned male at birth. She realised her identity as a woman at a young age. She said in an interview:

"Ever since I was young, I've never thought of myself as a boy. I used to dream of wearing a fishtail dress. My hand was holding a microphone. And after I woke up, I realised I wanted to be like that, to grow up to become a girl - a good, beautiful girl."

Huong Giang grew her hair long and wore make up frequently. People often thought that she was a weird boy, and they criticised and discriminated against her. In her autobiography, she wrote, "Many nights I cried until I had no tears left because of the humiliation and the ridicule from others."

Huong Giang underwent gender-affirming surgery in Thailand as an adult. In order to earn money for the surgery, she sang at many shows, such as in restaurants and at weddings. Her parents were initially unsupportive of her decision to transition but have since apologised for this and have publicly expressed their pride in their daughter's success.

== Television ==
Huong Giang was the first transgender singer to participate in the fourth season of Vietnam Idol, finishing the show in fourth place.

In 2014, Huong Giang was a contestant on The Amazing Race Vietnam Season 3 with her then-boyfriend, Criss Lai, winning the competition. The pair returned to the show on the 5th season - an all-stars edition, finishing in second place.

In 2015, Huong Giang took part in the 6th season of Dancing with the Stars Vietnam (Bước Nhảy Hoàn Vũ). Huong Giang and her dance partner finished the series in 5th place, being eliminated in the semi-final.

In 2017, Huong Giang joined the reality show Stars in the Army (Sao nhập ngũ), where celebrities experience the strict and challenging life of the military in seven days. Huong Giang's humor brought many moments of laughter to both the other participants and audience.

From 2018 to 2020, Huong Giang participated in three seasons of the reality show Who is Single Vietnam (Người ấy là ai?) as a mentor. She was the key factor that made the show successful. In Who is Single Vietnam, Huong Giang represented the LGBTQ+ community. With her humor and intelligence, she shared with the audience the experiences and challenges faced by LGBTQ+ people, helping viewers better understand this community.

In 2023, Huong Giang was a coach on the inaugural season of The New Mentor, a Vietnamese reality TV competition that sought to train a new generation of models with leadership qualities for the high-end fashion industry. The other coaches on the show were supermodels Lan Khue and Thanh Hang, and singer Ho Ngoc Ha.

== Pageantry ==
=== Miss International Queen ===
Hương Giang represented Vietnam and finished in first place at Miss International Queen 2018, winning herself a cash prize of US$12,500. At the competition, she also won Best Talent for her performance of Hush Hush; Hush Hush by The Pussycat Dolls, as well as most popular introductory video. Prior to the competition, Huong Giang had had no background in pageantry, as there had not been an official pageantry competition for transgender contestants in Vietnam at the time. Huong Giang was also the first Vietnamese contestant in Miss International Queen.

In 2022, Huong Giang returned to the final of Miss International Queen as a member of the judging panel.

=== Miss International Queen Vietnam ===
After being crowned as Miss International Queen in 2018, Huong Giang acquired the license for the franchise to organise the competition in Vietnam. The competition, which seeks to select the Vietnamese representative for Miss International Queen, was initially called The Tiffany Vietnam and is now known as Miss International Queen Vietnam. The competition is produced by Huong Giang's production company, Huong Giang entertainment, and broadcast on its YouTube channel.

To date, four editions of the competition have taken place, with Huong Giang acting as producer and judge for all four seasons. Its first ever winner was Nhat Ha, crowned in 2019.

Many of the contestants on Miss International Queen Vietnam have since found success internationally. Nguyễn Tường San, who finished the 2023 competition as first runner-up, went on to be the second runner-up at Miss International Queen 2024. Hà Tâm Như, who won the 2025 competition, finished Miss International Queen 2025 as second runner-up.

Prior to the first edition of Miss International Queen in 2018/19, pageant competitions for transgender women had been held in Vietnam, but they were not recognised officially as national competitions.

=== Miss Universe ===
In 2025 she became the second transgender person to be crowned Miss Universe Vietnam. She is also the transgender person to represent an Asian country in the Miss Universe pageant franchise. Speaking on Huong Giang's selection to represent Vietnam on this international stage, the president of Miss Universe Vietnam said:

"Miss Universe is no longer merely a beauty contest. It has become a global platform for real stories – for women who represent courage and transformation. Huong Giang is the living embodiment of that message."

Despite not advancing into the top 30 of the competition, Huong Giang's appearance on the show was positively received by audience internationally, particularly with her runway in a traditional Vietnamese dress (ao dai). Writing for HuffPost, Tracey Anne Duncan noted the significance of Huong Giang's participation in the competition as a transgender woman in 2025, a year marked by anti-trans legislations, notably under the second presidency of Donald Trump.

=== Miss Grand International ===
In 2026, Miss Grand International announced via social media that Huong Giang will take part in its first ever all-stars edition, set to take place on 30 May in Thailand.

== Business ventures ==
Huong Giang runs her own production company, Huong Giang entertainment, which produces a number of reality shows, including Miss International Queen Vietnam.

In 2019, Huong Giang collaborated with M.O.I. cosmetics, founded by singer Ho Ngoc Ha, to release her lipstick line S.girls, attracting a large crowd of customers and fans to its launch event.

== Autobiography ==
Huong Giang published her autobiography, her first book, on March 25, 2014. The book tells the story of her life, which she describes as involving "two people, two lives, and two genders." In the book, Huong Giang discusses the strong discrimination and stigmatisation faced by LGBTQ+ people in Vietnam, her transition journey, and her relationship with her family. Regarding the purpose of the book, she shared: "Although I have only lived a short part of my life, I have already experienced many major changes. I think I should tell my story as a way of sharing with people who are in the same situation as I am, or with others, so that empathy and understanding can spread." In addition, she expressed that she would do her best to become a singer in order to show not only her parents but also others that "no matter what form I live in, I can still be a useful person and a kind human being."

== Personal life ==
Huong Giang was in a highly publicised relationship with Criss Lai, a Vietnamese Canadian who was born in 1981. In 2014, Huong Giang and Criss Lai met and developed feelings for each other during the reality show The Amazing Race Vietnam Season 3. They were partners and eventually won the competition. They broke up after two years. However, they remain friends and continue to support each other.

In 2019, Huong Giang and Matt Liu were matched on the dating show Who is Single Vietnam (Người ấy là ai?). Matt Liu was born in 1994 and is Chinese Singaporean. He is the CEO of a company and is known for his collections of luxury cars, watches, and other luxury items. Huong Giang and Matt Liu attended many events together. The couple separated in August 2022.

Her new old boyfriend is Nguyễn Phú Cường, who was born in 1994. Nguyễn Phú Cường is a model and a fitness trainer.

== Activism and impact ==
LGBTQ+ people in Vietnam face discrimination from society; among them, transgender women are the group that experiences the most discrimination. They are stigmatized, marginalized, have fewer job choices, and are forced to work in the sex industry. Huong Giang is considered one of the most visible transgender people in Vietnam, with her frequent appearance on mainstream television as an openly trans woman coinciding with growing acceptance of the LGBTQ+ community in the country. She has been seen as a role model for LGBTQ+ youths in showing that LGBTQ+ individuals can achieve success. Through the shows she participates in, interviews, and her autobiography, she continuously presents LGBTQ+ people in general and trans women in particular to raise awareness and promote understanding and empathy toward the LGBTQ+ community. In recent years, the media has portrayed trans women more positively, such as when Huong Giang won Miss International Queen in 2018. In fact, Huong Giang herself has cited the ability to change negative public perception of transgender people as a motivation behind her work in pageantry:

"In Viet Nam, a majority of people still hold the belief that transgender people have neurological problems. [...] The crown is a positive symbol that will help people recognise that the LGBT community has people who are talented and thus deserve respect."

Upon winning Miss International Queen in 2018, Huong Giang affirmed her commitments to advocate for the transgender people in her native country:

"I will fight for equality for transgender people. Everyone wants to be happy and so do transgender people. We all want a good life where we are treated like everyone else and not discriminated against."

Indeed, she actively contributes to the activism of transgender people as well as LGBTQ+ people in Vietnam. Huong Giang performed at ASEAN Pride in Hanoi in 2015 - its second ever edition. She has spoken in favour of legal recognition for transgender people and legislative changes to make it easier for transgender people to change their identity documents in Vietnam. In 2019, Forbes Vietnam listed Huong Giang among the top 50 influential women in the country for her LGBTQ+ rights activism.

Regarding her contribution to academia, researchers often use Huong Giang as a sample for their studies to learn more about the LGBTQ+ community, particularly transgender people. For instance, Bui (2018) chose Huong Giang's stardom as a case study to explore how the Vietnamese online media portrays transgender individuals. The research shows that the online media emphasizes the gender binary, allowing people to identify as only one of the two genders. Furthermore, the journalists and transgender people themselves often depicted transgender individuals as having a "wrong body." Hoang, Nguyen, and Bui (2024) examined how Huong Giang expressed in her autobiography her thoughts about the perception of the Vietnamese society about women and how transgender people need to change themselves to fit into these standards. Nguyen (2024) studied the discourses on LGBTQ+ people in the show Who is Single Vietnam and mentioned Huong Giang several times as a key factor contributing to the success of the show and helping people understand and sympathize with LGBTQ+ community.

== Discography ==
=== Studio album ===
- Thủy ngân
  - Release date: October 23, 2013
  - Record label: Bến Thành Audio – Video
  - Format: CD, streaming

=== Singles ===
Year	Title	English translation	Featured artist(s)	Notes
2013	"Trò đùa tạo hóa"	"The Trick of Fate"	—N/a	
2013	"Trà chanh Acoustic"	"Lemon Tea Acoustic"	Phạm Hồng Phước	
2013	"Mùa ta đã yêu"	"The Season We Fell in Love"	Phạm Hồng Phước	
2013	"Khi chúng ta già"	"When We Grow Old"	Phạm Hồng Phước	
2013	"Tình yêu đau đớn thế"	"Love Is So Painful"	Various artists	
2014	"Cảm thấy mệt mỏi"	"Feeling Blue"	—N/a	
2015	"Ai đẹp nhất đêm nay?"	"Who is the Most Beautiful Tonight?"	—N/a	
2015	"Đốm tròn vệt nắng"	"Round Spots of Sunlight"	—N/a	
2015	"Từ ngày mai em sẽ khác"	"From Tomorrow I Will Be Different"	—N/a	
2016	"Mưa nhớ"	"Missing Rain"	—N/a	
2016	"Tình nhân"	"Lover"	—N/a	
2016	"Mùa để yêu thương"	"Season to Love"	—N/a	
2016	"Em không hối tiếc"	"I Have No Regrets"	R.Tee	
2017	"Vì yêu mà cưới"	"Marrying for Love"	—N/a	
2017	"Go Away – Hương Giang of The Remix"		—N/a	
2018	"Anh đang ở đâu đấy anh?"	"Where Are You, My Love?"	—N/a	
2018	"Mặt trời vẫn tới mỗi ngày"	"The Sun Still Comes Every Day"	Đàm Vĩnh Hưng, Noo Phước Thịnh, Văn Mai Hương, Hoà Minzy, and Erik	
2019	"Em đã thấy anh cùng người ấy"	"I Saw You With That Person"	—N/a	
2019	"Em hơi mệt với bạn thân anh"	"I’m a Little Tired of Your Best Friend"	Trang Pháp and Masew	
2019	"Cứ vô tư đi"	"Just Be Carefree"	—N/a	
2019	"Mẹ ơi đừng khóc"	"Mom, Don’t Cry"	Chấn Quốc	
2019	"Anh ta bỏ em rồi"	"He Left Me"	—N/a	
2020	"Tặng anh cho cô ấy"	"Giving You to Her"	—N/a	
2020	"Anh đi đi"	"Go Away"	Erik	Soundtrack of Sắc đẹp dối trá ("Beautiful Lies")
2022	"Em buông"	"I Let Go"	—N/a	
2022	"Xin lỗi em không ổn"	"Sorry, I’m Not Okay"	—N/a	

== Filmography ==
Film and Television

Year	Title	Role	Notes
2014	Bếp hát	Hương	Musical TV series
2014	Đại gia đình quái đản	Hương Giang Idol	Long-running TV series
2015	Trót yêu	Thúy	Feature film
2015	8 văn phòng	Giang Hương	Online series, Episode 8
2019	Gia đình vui nhộn	Trang	TV series (Sitcom)
2020	Sắc đẹp dối trá	Nguyễn Hang Dương	Feature film

Music Videos

- Khi có em – Hà Anh (2017)
- Hello – Đàm Vĩnh Hưng and Binz (2018)
- Mặt trời vẫn tới mỗi ngày – Đàm Vĩnh Hưng, Noo Phước Thịnh, Văn Mai Hương, Hòa Minzy, and Erik (2018)
- Cô đơn trên sofa – Hồ Ngọc Hà (2022)

== Awards and achievements ==
Awards and achievements
Preceded by None	2nd Runner-up MGI All Stars; 1st Edition	Succeeded by TBA
Preceded by Nguyễn Cao Kỳ Duyên	Miss Universe Vietnam; 2025	Succeeded by Nguyễn Quỳnh Anh (Dethroned)
Preceded by (Thailand) Jiratchaya Sirimongkolnawin	Miss International Queen; 2018	Succeeded by (United States) Jazell Barbie Royale
Preceded by Angelina May Nguyễn	Miss International Queen Vietnam; 2018	Succeeded by Đỗ Nhật Hà
