= Dược Sĩ Tiến =

Vietnamese pharmacist, entrepreneur, and television producer (born 1989)

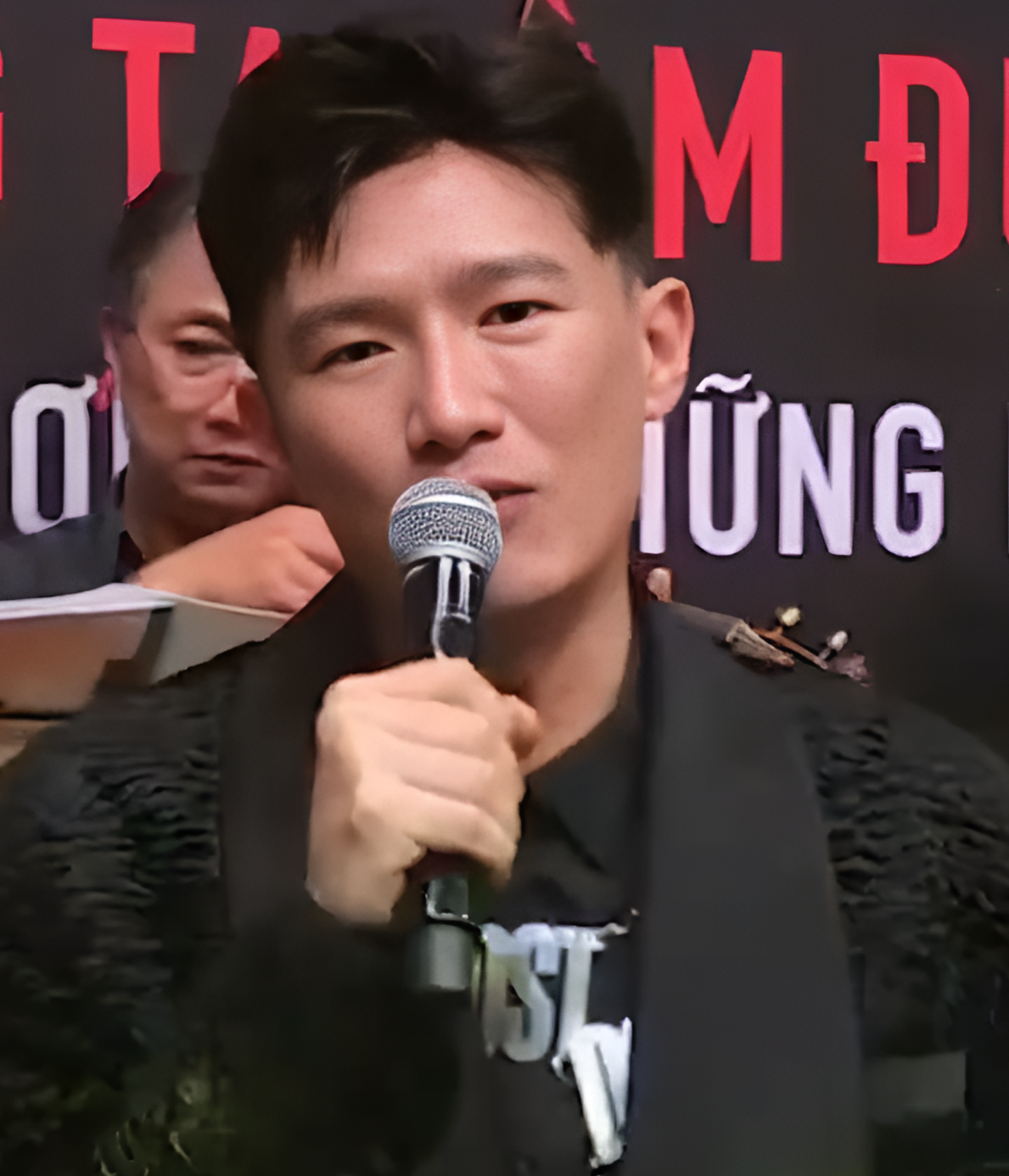
- Dược Sĩ Tiến in 2022
- Born: Phạm Minh Hữu Tiến; April 12, 1989 (age 37); Cần Thơ, Vietnam
- Education: Can Tho University of Medicine and Pharmacy
- Occupations: Pharmacist; Entrepreneur; Television producer
- Years active: 2015–present
- Known for: Vietnam Supermodel 2018 judge; The New Mentor producer; Beauty pageant organization

Phạm Minh Hữu Tiến (born 12 April 1989), known as Dược Sĩ Tiến is a Vietnamese pharmacist, entrepreneur, and television producer. He graduated valedictorian from Can Tho University of Medicine and Pharmacy and transitioned from academia to become a prominent figure in Vietnam's entertainment industry, founding multiple business ventures spanning cosmetics manufacturing, television production, and beauty pageant organization.

== Early life and education ==
Tiến was born on 12 April 1989 in Cần Thơ, Vietnam. His father worked as an automotive design engineer, while his mother was a vocational instructor at a beauty center and owned an established beauty care facility.

Initially considering music academy, Tiến chose to study pharmacy. He enrolled at Can Tho University of Medicine and Pharmacy, where he graduated as valedictorian of his class. Following graduation, he was retained as a lecturer at the university, teaching in Pharmaceutical Management, Pharmaceutical Industry, and Pharmaceutics.

== Career ==
=== Academic and pharmaceutical background ===
After graduation, Tiến worked as a lecturer at Can Tho University of Medicine and Pharmacy before transitioning to business and entertainment. He established expertise in cosmetic chemistry and aesthetic medicine.

=== Business ventures ===
In 2015, Tiến founded Công ty TNHH Dược Sĩ Tiến (Dược Sĩ Tiến Co., Ltd.), which operates in both beauty/cosmetics and entertainment industries. The company grew to employ over 200 staff members by 2024. He established a private cosmetics manufacturing facility, developing Vietnamese-specific skincare products under brands including DrCeutics and VinaCeuticals.

Tiến also founded DST Entertainment, a production company based in Ho Chi Minh City that focuses on television production, beauty pageants, and reality shows. He has reported investing over 50 billion VND (approximately $2 million USD) in entertainment ventures between 2018 and 2024.

=== Television and entertainment production ===
Tiến gained significant public attention as a judge on Vietnam Supermodel 2018, where his dramatic fashion choices and controversial judging style became widely discussed in Vietnamese media. His television production credits include:

- The New Mentor (2023) – Producer and host of reality TV show for fashion models
- The Next Gentleman – Co-producer with Hương Giang
- Miss Universe Vietnam 2024 – Producer and judge
- Miss International Queen Vietnam 2023 – Co-producer
- The Tiffany Vietnam – Judge and advisor
- Miss Grand Vietnam 2025 judger

=== Film and digital content ===
In 2023, Tiến produced and starred in the horror film "Hạnh phúc máu" (Blood Happiness), which achieved notable success, particularly in Myanmar. He also produced the web drama series "Tiến Bromance" and created 15 music videos for the "Hạnh phúc máu" soundtrack. His YouTube channel "Dược sĩ Tiến • Entertainment" has accumulated over 500,000 subscribers.

== Publications ==
In 2017, Tiến authored "Khoa Học Về Làn Da" (Science of Skin), a 300-page book covering skin physiology, cosmetic chemistry, and dermatological aesthetics.

== Awards and recognition ==
Tiến received the Golden Hand Award (Giải thưởng Bàn Tay Vàng) in 2016 from the Vietnam Union of Science and Technology Associations in cooperation with Vietnam Intellectual Property Office for professional excellence in the pharmaceutical field. In 2017, he won the title Nam Vương Người Việt Thế Giới (Vietnamese World King) in the United States, which served as his entry point into the Vietnamese entertainment industry.

== Controversies ==
On 14 July 2025, Tiến announced the development of an AI chatbot called "ChatDST," claiming it was superior to ChatGPT and utilized 12 Nvidia A100 GPUs with 960GB VRAM. However, LeadTek Vietnam, the official Nvidia distributor, confirmed they had never sold A100 chips to him, and technical specifications were questioned by AI experts. The announcement video was subsequently removed from YouTube.

Tiến has also faced disputes with other entertainment industry figures and has been involved in various controversies regarding product endorsements and business practices, though he has denied connections to fraudulent supplement sales when such allegations arose in 2025.

== Technology ventures ==
In 2024-2025, Tiến expanded into technology ventures, announcing several initiatives including the Chat DST AI application (scheduled for release October 2025), DST Mall e-commerce platform, and TRẺ CONNECT, a banking card for Vietnamese students developed in partnership with VietinBank and NAPAS.

== Public presence ==
Tiến maintains an active social media presence with approximately 261,000 likes on his main Facebook page and over 600,000 subscribers across his YouTube channels. He is known for his elaborate fashion choices and dramatic public appearances, which have made him a recognizable figure in Vietnamese entertainment media.

As a beauty consultant, he provides professional advisory services to multiple spas and clinics nationwide and has trained over 3,000 students in beauty care practices across Vietnam.
