= Miss International Queen Vietnam 2025 =

- Date: 10 May 2025
- Venue: Phan Thiết, Ninh Thuận
- Entrants: 14
- Placements: 6
- Returns: 1
- Winner: Hà Tâm Như; Vĩnh Long
- Best National Costume: Nguyễn Cao Minh Anh; Hà Nội

Miss International Queen Vietnam 2025, the 4th Miss International Queen Vietnam pageant, was held on 10 May 2025, in Phan Thiết, at Bikini Beach Square, NovaWorld. Nguyễn Hà Dịu Thảo of Hải Dương crowned her successor, Hà Tâm Như, at the end of the event.

== Final results ==
Placement	Candidate
Miss International Queen Vietnam 2025	Hà Tâm Như
1st runner-up (Miss International Queen Vietnam 2026)	Nguyễn Cao Minh Anh
2nd runner-up	Nguyễn Thủy Tiên
Top 6	Trần Khởi My; Trần Quân; Tô Ngọc Bảo Linh
Top 14	Lộ Lộ; Nikkie Song Phúc; Huỳnh My; Hoàng Bảo Anh; Trần Mẫn Nhi; Phạm Thư Kỳ; Lê Tuệ Vy; Bùi Phạm Phương Nhã

=== Special awards ===
Position	Contestant
Best National Costume	Nguyễn Cao Minh Anh
Best Face	Cao Minh Hy
Best Catwalk	Lê An Di
Best Inspirer	Lộ Lộ
Best Talent	Tô Ngọc Bảo Linh
Most Popular	Nikkie Song Phúc

=== Mentors ===
- Lê Hoàng Phương — Miss Grand Vietnam 2023 & 4th Runner-Up Miss Grand International 2023.
- Chế Nguyễn Quỳnh Châu — 1st Runner-Up Miss Grand Vietnam 2022.
- Bùi Quỳnh Hoa — Miss Universe Vietnam 2023.
- Vũ Thúy Quỳnh — 2nd Runner- Up Miss Universe Vietnam 2023.

Mentor	Episode							
Mentor	1	2	3	4	5	6	7	8
Hoàng Phương	Top 5	OUT	WIN	LOW	WIN	3rd	OUT	WIN
Chế Châu	Top 5	OUT	IN	WIN	OUT	2nd	LOW	1ST RUNNER-UP
Quỳnh Hoa	Top 5	WIN	OUT	WIN	OUT	4th	OUT	2ND RUNNER-UP
Thúy Quỳnh	Top 5	IN	OUT	OUT	IN	1st	LOW	TOP 14

=== Judges ===
- Nguyễn Hương Giang — Miss International Queen 2018.
- Nguyễn Minh Tú — Silver Prize Vietnam Supermodel 2013.
- Vũ Hà Anh — Top 10 Miss Universe Vietnam 2008, 2nd Runner-up Miss Vietnam Global 2008.
- Nguyễn Huỳnh Như — Star Idol of Vietnam.
