= Kataluna Enriquez =

American beauty queen

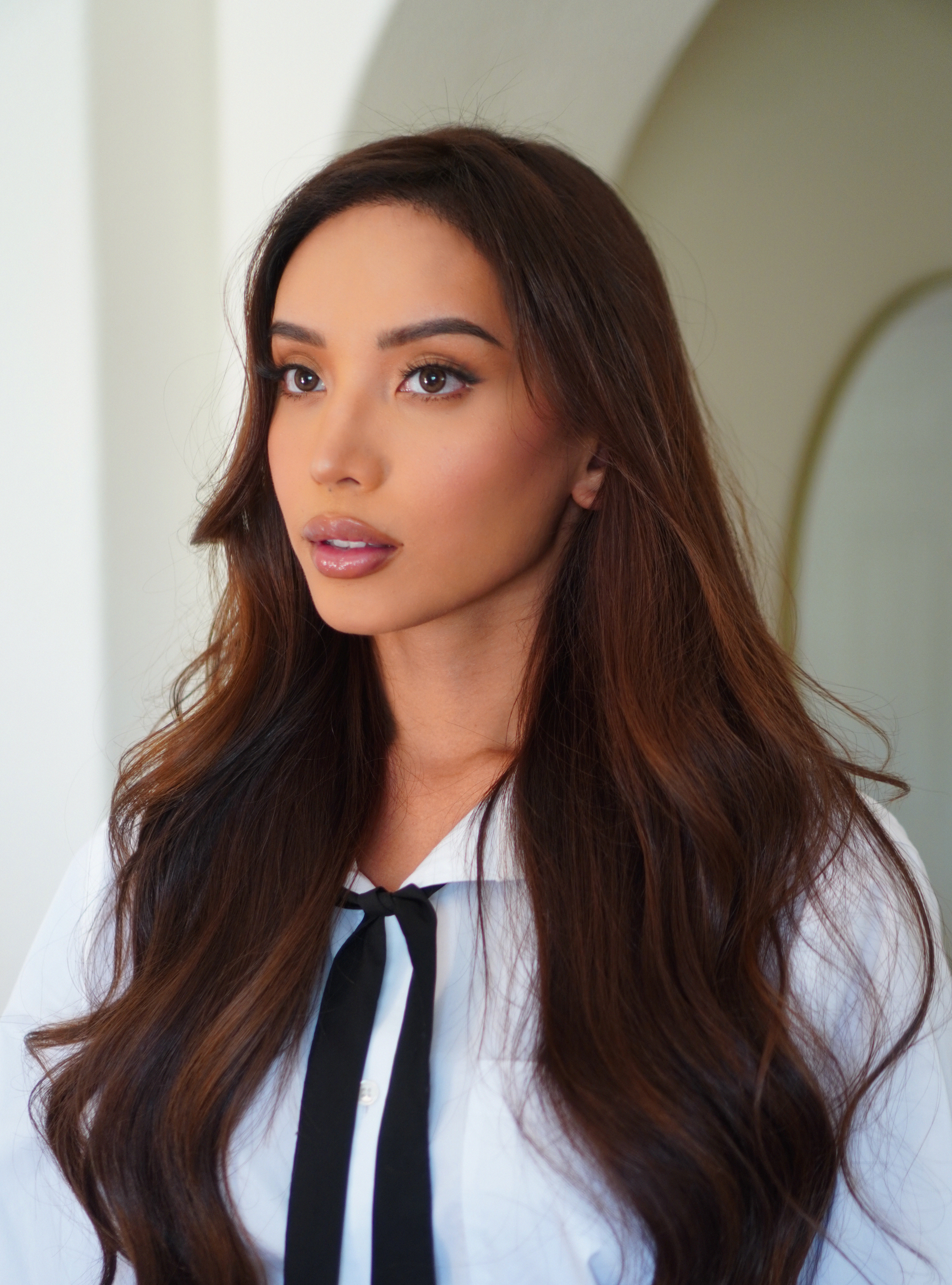
- Enriquez in 2023
- Born: 1994 or 1995 (age 31–32); Angeles, Pampanga, Philippines
- Years active: 2015–present
- Known for: First openly transgender woman to compete in Miss USA
- Beauty pageant titleholder
- Title: Miss Nevada USA 2021; Miss International Queen USA 2024
- Major competitions: Miss Silver State USA 2021; (Winner); Miss Nevada USA 2021; (Winner); Miss USA 2021; (Unplaced); Miss International Queen 2024; (Top 6)

Kataluna Patricia Enriquez is an American beauty pageant titleholder. In March 2021, she won the Miss Silver State USA pageant. On June 27, 2021, she was crowned Miss Nevada USA. With her wins, she became the first openly transgender woman to earn the titles and to become qualified to compete in the Miss USA pageant. She is also the owner of a clothing line, Kataluna Kouture.

== Early life and education ==
Kataluna Enriquez was born in the Philippines and emigrated to the United States with her family when she was 10, settling in San Leandro, California and becoming a member of the San Leandro Academy for Multimedia (SLAM), in the San Francisco Bay Area. She is Filipina American and is the eldest of seven siblings.

She has spoken publicly about her high school experiences surviving bullying, abuse, and discrimination due to her gender identity, as well as her positive experiences with mental health therapy during childhood.

Enriquez later attended school for fashion design at the Fashion Institute of Design and Merchandising.

== Career ==
Enriquez began competing in transgender pageants in 2015, while working as a model. She has previously won Queen California, Queen USA 2016, and Super Sireyna WWUSA. When she first began competing, she was unable to afford custom designer gowns, so she designed her own and later started her own fashion line, Kataluna Kouture. She began competing in cisgender pageants in 2020.

She has used the platform of pageants to advocate for inclusivity and diversity, and to promote transgender rights and support for LGBTQ+ youth. She also uses her social media to promote the hashtag #BEVISIBLE, in a campaign against hate that includes sharing her life experiences.

In March 2021, Enriquez won Miss Silver State USA, which qualified her to compete at Miss Nevada USA 2021, and she was the first openly transgender woman to win the Miss Silver State USA title. In June 2021, she won the title of Miss Nevada USA, which qualified her to participate in the Miss USA 2021 pageant and made her the first openly transgender woman to compete for the Miss USA title. At Miss USA 2021, Enriquez did not advance to the final stage. Afterwards, Miss USA Elle Smith said it was "an honor" to participate with Enriquez and "she had every right to be on that stage". As Miss Nevada USA, Enriquez plans to engage in public speaking and advocacy on behalf of the LGBTQIA Center of Southern Nevada and Las Vegas TransPride.

In addition to her work as a model and fashion designer, she also works as a healthcare administrator with a focus on healthcare needs for LGBTQ+ patients.

Awards and achievements
| Preceded by Victoria Olona | Miss Nevada USA; 2021 | Succeeded by Summer Keffeler |
| Preceded by Melony Munro | Miss International Queen USA; 2024 | Succeeded by Midori Monét |
| Preceded by (Thailand) Arissara Kankla | Best Talent; Miss International Queen; 2024 | Succeeded by (Laos) Taneung Chanthasenesack |
| Preceded by (Vietnam) Nguyễn Hà Dịu Thảo | Best Social Influencer; Miss International Queen; 2024 | Succeeded by (Philippines) Anne Patricia Lorenzo |
