= The Amazing Race Vietnam 2016 =

Season of television series

- Season 2016
- Presented by: Huy Khánh
- No. of teams: 10
- Winners: Đinh Tiến Đạt & Lincoln Thúc Lĩnh
- No. of legs: 11
- No. of episodes: 11

Release
- Original network: VTV6
- Original release: 31 March – 9 June 2016

Additional information
- Filming dates: Late 2015

Series chronology
- ← Previous; Season 4 Next → Season 6

The Amazing Race Vietnam: Cuộc đua kỳ thú 2016 is the fifth season of The Amazing Race Vietnam, a Vietnamese reality competition show based on the American series The Amazing Race. It featured ten teams of two in a race around Vietnam for 300 million₫. This season's teams consisted of all-stars.

The program aired on VTV6 from 31 March to 9 June 2016.

Huy Khánh returned as host after he was absent during the previous season.

Rapper Tiến Đạt and hotel manager Thúc Lĩnh Lincoln, who had competed on different teams from Season 2 and Season 4, respectively, were the winners of this season.

== Production ==
=== Development and filming ===
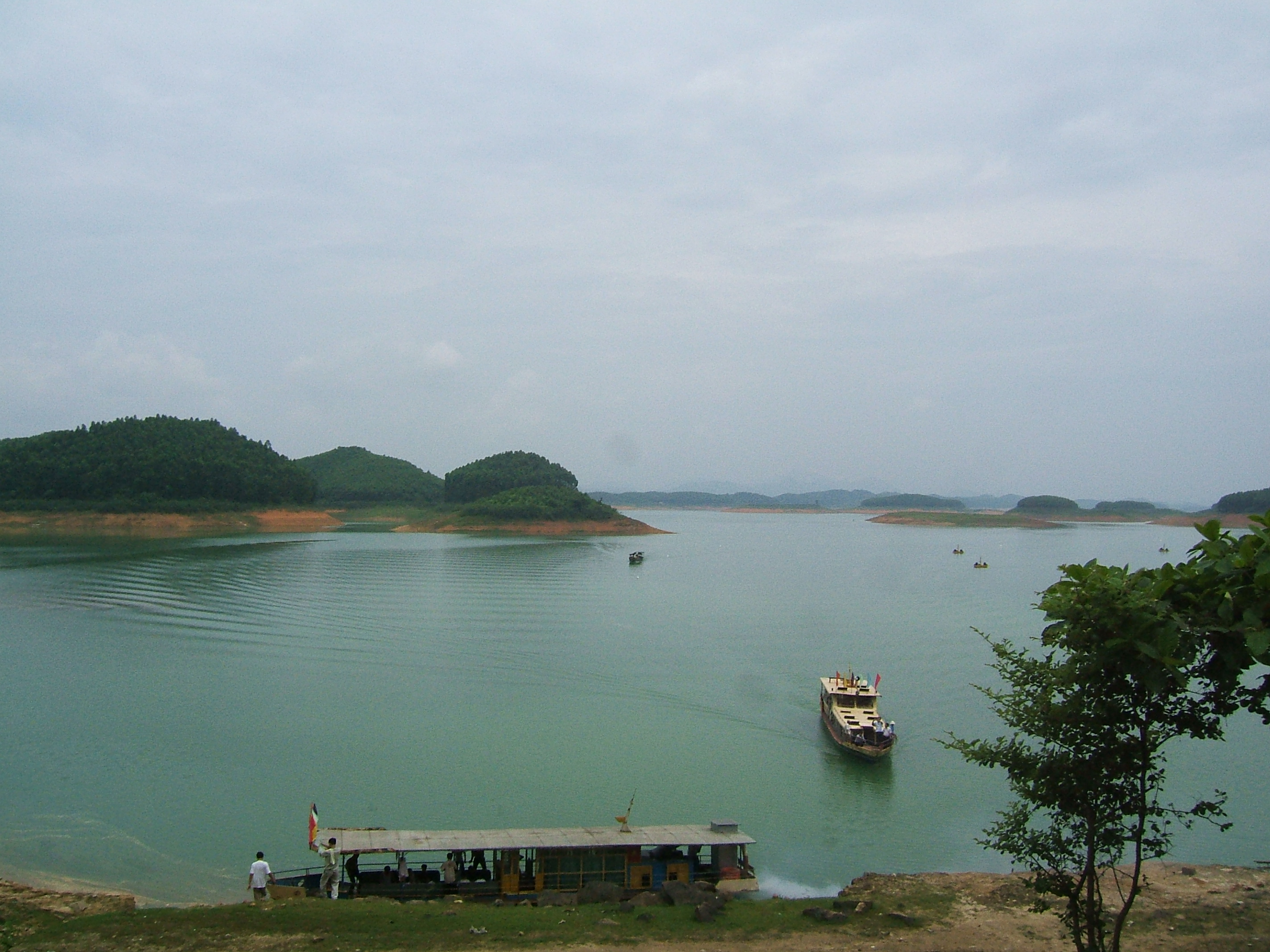
The all-star teams gathered at the Thác Bà Hydroelectric Dam to begin the fifth season of The Amazing Race Vietnam.

This season began filming in late 2015.

As the season was titled "All-Stars", it is the first time that one of the international spin-offs of The Amazing Race featured returning contestants (the eleventh, the eighteenth (dubbed as "Unfinished Business") and the twenty-fourth seasons of the original American version also featured returning teams).

The non-elimination penalty, the Speed Bump, was introduced to the series. As with the American version, the Speed Bump requires the team that finished last in a non-elimination leg to perform an additional task at some point during the next leg.

During this season's visit to Australia, there was a planned Roadblock task in Yarrawonga involving an ultralight aircraft. During filming, an ultralight crashed after encountering dust devils, killing both occupants. Ian Cook, the pilot who flew along with Sydney-based Vietnamese cameraman Quoc Huong Vu, were taking aerial shots of the location. This incident occurred during the middle of a Roadblock, which some of the contestants had already completed. As such, the Roadblock task was cancelled, and teams continued to New South Wales to continue with the leg. The task in Yarrawonga was not aired or acknowledged during the episode.

== Cast ==
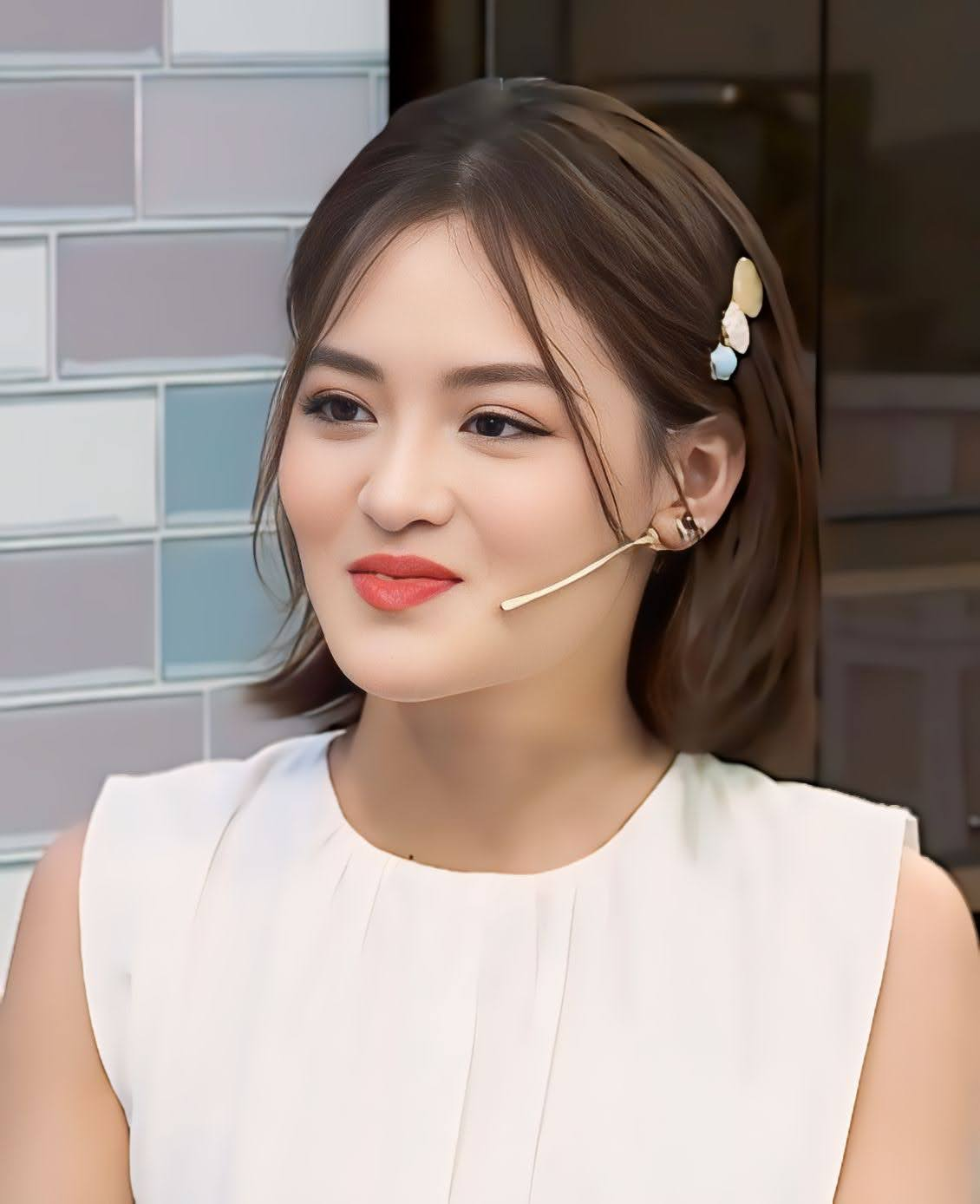
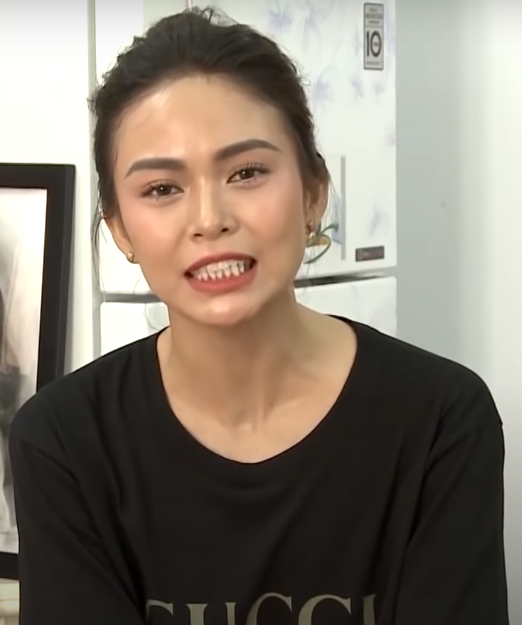
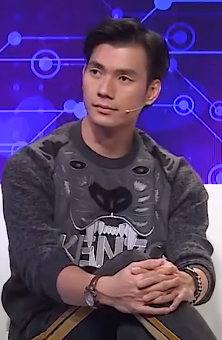
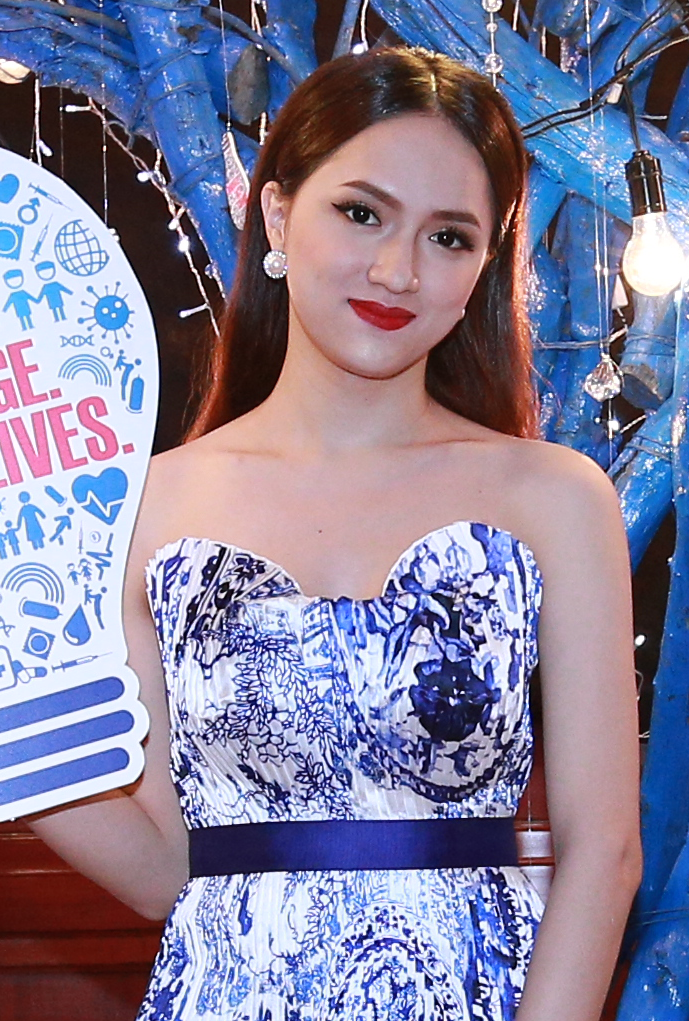
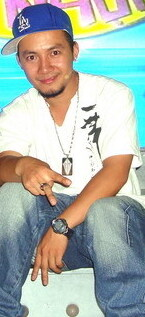
From left to right: Thùy Anh, Thanh Thủy, Phúc Vinh, Hương Giang and Tiến Đạt

Contestants	Age	Profession	Hometown	Status
Đăng Hoàng Phạm Ngô	25	Teacher; The Amazing Race Vietnam 2015	Hanoi	Eliminated 1st (in Lìm Mông, Yên Bái)
Thùy Anh Nguyễn	21	Actor; The Amazing Race Vietnam 2015	Hanoi	Eliminated 1st (in Lìm Mông, Yên Bái)
Sơn Ngọc Minh	26	Singer; The Amazing Race Vietnam 2014	Cần Thơ	Eliminated 2nd (in Nam Định, Nam Định)
Mâu Thanh Thủy	24	Model	Ho Chi Minh City	Eliminated 2nd (in Nam Định, Nam Định)
Richie Humphrey	43	Actor; The Amazing Race Vietnam 2012	Los Angeles, California	Eliminated 3rd (in Lăng Cô, Thừa Thiên Huế)
Ngọc Phượng "Mimi" Lý Thị	27	Office Worker; The Amazing Race Vietnam 2012	Ho Chi Minh City	Eliminated 3rd (in Lăng Cô, Thừa Thiên Huế)
Thu Hiền Trần Thị	27	Model; The Amazing Race Vietnam 2013	Hanoi	Eliminated 4th (in Thôn Phú Hạnh, Phú Yên)
Minh Long Nguyễn	28	Tattooist; The Amazing Race Vietnam 2014	Da Nang	Eliminated 4th (in Thôn Phú Hạnh, Phú Yên)
Phạm Thị "Song Ngư" Diễm Chi	23	Actress; The Amazing Race Vietnam 2015	Cần Thơ	Eliminated 5th (in Vũng Tàu, Bà Rịa-Vũng Tàu)
Trúc Như Nguyễn Vũ	25	Actress; The Amazing Race Vietnam 2015	Tân An, Long An	Eliminated 5th (in Vũng Tàu, Bà Rịa-Vũng Tàu)
Anh Tuấn Phạm	32	Model; The Amazing Race Vietnam 2013	Haiphong	Eliminated 6th (on Côn Đảo, Bà Rịa-Vũng Tàu)
Thanh Hoa Đỗ Thị	26	Stylist; The Amazing Race Vietnam 2013	Hanoi	Eliminated 6th (on Côn Đảo, Bà Rịa-Vũng Tàu)
Pha Lê Nguyễn	29	Singer; The Amazing Race Vietnam 2013	Haiphong	Eliminated 7th (in An Phú, Ho Chi Minh City)
Hà Việt Dũng	29	Actor; The Amazing Race Vietnam 2013	Mãn Đức, Hòa Bình	Eliminated 7th (in An Phú, Ho Chi Minh City)
Nhan Phúc Vinh	30	Actor; The Amazing Race Vietnam 2013	Cần Thơ	Third Place
Thùy Dung Nguyễn	29	Editor; The Amazing Race Vietnam 2013	Hanoi	Third Place
Ngọc Hiếu "Hương Giang" Nguyễn	25	Singer; The Amazing Race Vietnam 2014	Hanoi	Second Place
Huy Phương "Criss" Lai	34	Athlete; The Amazing Race Vietnam 2014	Long An	Second Place
Tiến Đạt Đinh	35	Rapper; The Amazing Race Vietnam 2013	Ho Chi Minh City	Winners
Thúc Lĩnh "Lincoln" Dương Hồng	26	Hotel Manager; The Amazing Race Vietnam 2015	Paris, France	Winners

The returning teams and their prior placements are:

- From Season 1:
  - Richard "Richie" Humphrey and Ngọc Phượng "Mimi" Lý Thị, dating, 9th place
- From Season 2:
  - Pha Lê Nguyễn and Hà Việt Dũng, singer and actor, 7th place
  - Anh Tuấn Phạm and Thanh Hoa Đỗ Thị, models, 6th place
  - Nhan Phúc Vinh and Thùy Dung Nguyễn, actor and editor, 2nd place and 3rd place
- From Season 3:
  - Hương Giang Nguyễn and Huy Phương "Criss" Lai, singer and athlete, 1st place
- From Season 4:
  - Phạm Thị "Song Ngư" Diễm Chi and Trúc Như Nguyễn Vũ, actresses, 7th place
  - Đăng Hoàng Phạm Ngô and Thùy Anh Nguyễn, actors, 4th place
- Composite Teams:
  - Thu Hiền Trần Thị, 1st place in Season 2 and Minh Long Nguyễn, 9th place in Season 3
  - Tiến Đạt Đinh, 4th place in Season 2 and Thúc Lĩnh "Lincoln" Dương Hồng, 2nd place in Season 4
  - Sơn Ngọc Minh, 5th place in Season 3 and Mâu Thanh Thủy, winner of Vietnam's Next Top Model 4

=== Future appearances ===
Hương Giang Nguyễn appeared on the sixth season as a clue giver during the third episode and served as the host during the seventh episode in 2019.

== Results ==
The following teams participated in the season, with their relationships at the time of filming. Note that this table is not necessarily reflective of all content broadcast on television due to inclusion or exclusion of some data. Placements are listed in finishing order:

Team	Position (by leg)											Roadblocks performed^{9}
Team	1	2	3	4^{5}	5	6	7^{7}	8	9ε	10	11	Roadblocks performed^{9}
Tiến Đạt & Lincoln	1st^{1}	1st	1st	2nd	3rd	2nd	2nd	2nd	2nd	1st	1st	Tiến Đạt 4, Thúc Lĩnh 4
Hương Giang & Criss	3rd	8th	5th	6th⊃	1st^{6}	5th	4th⊂	1stƒ	1st	2nd	2nd	Hương Giang 3, Criss 4
Phúc Vinh & Thùy Dung	5th	5th	2nd	5th⊂	5th	1st	3rd	3rd	3rd	3rd	3rd	Phúc Vinh 6, Thùy Dung 2
Pha Lê & Việt Dũng	4th^{1}	2nd	7th	1st	6th	4th	5th	4th^{8}	**4th**	4th		Pha Lê 1, Việt Dũng 5
Anh Tuấn & Thanh Hoa	6th	7th^{2}	3rd	4th	4th	3rd	1st⊃	5th^{8}				Anh Tuấn 4, Thanh Hoa 2^{2}
Song Ngư & Trúc Như	10th	9th^{3}	8th	8th	2nd	6th	6th					Song Ngư 2, Trúc Như 3
Trần Hiền & Minh Long	9th	4th	4th	3rd	7th	7th						Trần Hiền 1, Minh Long 2
Richie & Mimi	2nd	6th^{2}	9th	7th	8th							Richie 1, Mimi 1^{2}
Ngọc Minh & Thanh Thủy	8th	3rd	6th	9th								Ngọc Minh 1, Thanh Thủy 1
Đăng Hoàng & Thùy Anh	7th	10th^{4}										Đăng Hoàng 1, Thùy Anh 1

Key

- A red team placement means the team was eliminated.
- A green ƒ indicates that the team won a Fast Forward.
- A purple ε indicates that the team decided to use the Express Pass on that leg; if next to a leg number, it indicates that the team with the Express Pass forfeited the Pass at the Pit Stop of that leg without ever having used it.
- A blue team's placement indicates that the team came in last on a non-elimination leg.
  - An underlined blue team's placement indicates that the team came in last on a non-elimination leg and was "Marked for Elimination"; if the team did not finish 1st on the next leg, they would receive a 30-minute penalty.
  - An italicized blue placement indicates that the team would not receive any money at the start of the next leg.
  - A **bold blue** placement indicates that the team would have to perform a Speed Bump on the next leg.
- A brown ⊃ means the team chose to use a U-Turn; ⊂ indicates the team who received it.

Notes

1. Tiến Đạt & Thúc Lĩnh Lincoln and Pha Lê & Hà Việt Dũng initially arrived 1st and 3rd, respectively, but were each issued a 15-minute penalty after Thúc Lĩnh Lincoln and Hà Việt Dũng took the clue out of their mouth during the first task. While this did not affect Tiến Đạt & Thúc Lĩnh Lincoln's placement, Hương Giang & Criss Lai checked in during Pha Lê & Hà Việt Dũng's penalty time, dropping them to 4th.
2. Thanh Hoa could not complete the Roadblock, and Mimi chose not to attempt it. Both teams were each issued a 2-hour penalty before receiving their next clue.
3. Song Ngư & Trúc Như initially arrived 6th, but were issued a 30-minute penalty for being "Marked for Elimination" and not arriving in 1st. Richie & Mimi, Anh Tuấn & Thanh Hoa and Hương Giang & Criss Lai checked-in during the penalty time, dropping Song Ngư & Trúc Như to 9th.
4. Đăng Hoàng & Thùy Anh initially arrived 7th, but were issued a 30-minute penalty for spilling too much water during the last challenge. The last three teams trailing them (Richie & Mimi, Thanh Hoa & Anh Tuấn and Hương Giang & Criss Lai) checked in during the penalty time, dropping Đăng Hoàng & Thùy Anh to last place and resulting in their elimination.
5. Six of the nine teams who arrived at the Pit Stop after applying time penalties based on how many congee dishes they failed to cook properly during the congee task. The initial placements for all teams and their number of failed dishes (10 minutes per each failed dish, in parentheses) are as follows (the three **boldfaced teams** without the parentheses were not given the penalty):
  1st: Pha Lê & Hà Việt Dũng (2); 2nd: Trần Hiền & Minh Long (3); 3rd: Tiến Đạt & Thúc Lĩnh Lincoln (1); 4th: **Anh Tuấn & Thanh Hoa**; 5th: **Nhan Phúc Vinh & Thuỳ Dung**; 6th: **Hương Giang & Criss Lai**; 7th: Sơn Ngọc Minh & Mâu Thanh Thủy (5); 8th: Richie & Mimi (1); 9th: Song Ngư & Trúc Như (2).
6. Hương Giang & Criss Lai initially arrived 1st, but were issued a 30-minute penalty because Hương Giang did not wear the chef's hat provided with the teams during the fast food challenge. This did not affect their placement.
7. All teams except for Tiến Đạt & Thúc Lĩnh Lincoln were issued time penalties at the Pit Stop for failing to eat their bowl of Phở within the time limit. Hương Giang & Criss Lai were issued a 15-minute penalty for only eating 3 kg, while the remaining teams were issued 1-hour penalties for only eating 2 kg. Only the placement for Nhan Phúc Vinh & Thuỳ Dung was affected; dropping them from 2nd to 3rd.
8. Pha Lê & Hà Việt Dũng initially arrived 2nd, but were issued a 30-minute penalty for taking motorized transportation instead of a bicycle as stated in the clue. Tiến Đạt & Thúc Lĩnh Lincoln and Nhan Phúc Vinh & Thùy Dung checked-in during the penalty time, dropping them to 4th. Anh Tuấn & Thanh Hoa were eligible to be penalized for the same infraction, but they were the last team to arrive to the Pit Stop, resulting in their elimination.
9. Leg 9 featured a Roadblock that was cancelled during the leg and was not referenced during the episode's airing; it was excluded from the Roadblock count.

== Prizes ==
- Leg 1 – The Express Pass (Thẻ Ưu Tiên)
- Leg 12 – 300,000,000₫

== Race summary ==
Map of the fifth TAR Vietnam

Destinations	Air travel Rail travel Water travel Bus travel Helicopter travel Bicycle travel Gondola travel
Route Markers	Lựa chọn kép (Detour) Vượt rào (Roadblock) Nhảy cóc (Fast Forward); Rào cản (U-Turn) Game phụ (Speed Bump) Về đích (Pit Stop)

=== Leg 1 (Yên Bái) ===
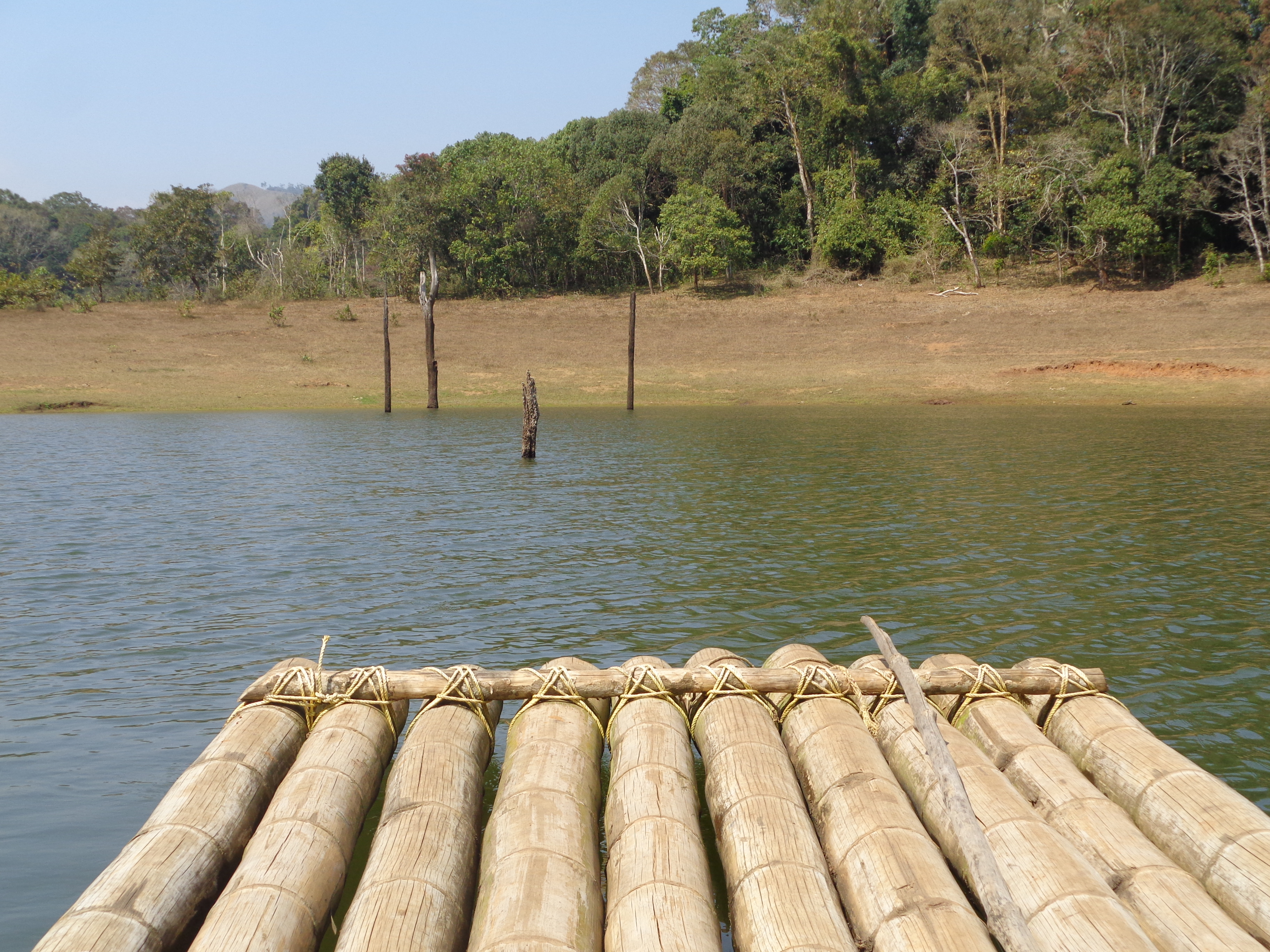
During the first leg on Thác Bà Lake, teams had to paddle a bamboo raft.

Airdate: 31 March 2016

- Thác Bà, Yên Bái Province, Vietnam (Thác Bà Hydroelectric Dam) (Starting Line)
- Thác Bà (Rừng Tràm Island)
- Thác Bà (Hydroelectric Dam Bridge)
- Thác Bà (Dền Mẫu Thác Bà)

In this season's first Roadblock, one team member had to climb a rope ladder up the tower in the centre of the hydroelectric dam bridge, carrying with them the bottle of Sting Energy Drink from the previous task to exchange for the next clue at the top.

Additional tasks

- At Thác Bà Hydroelectric Dam, one team member made their way down to the bottom of the dam to find two clue envelopes, only one of which actually contained a clue. They would choose one envelope and carry it in their mouth. Their partner would then rappel down the dam to retrieve it, however their safety cord wasn't long enough to reach all the way to the bottom, so they had to stretch to reach their partner. Once both were back on top, they opened the clue. If the empty envelope was chosen, they had to do the task again.
- Teams then had to paddle a bamboo boat to Rừng Tràm Island where they touched an Amazing Race flag to determine the order in which teams could perform the next task. One team member would be blindfolded for the duration of the task. Their partner had to guide them using verbal directions through a spiderweb of ropes to find their next clue at the end. If they touched any ropes along the way, a bell would ring. After touching a rope twice, they would have to go to the back of the line and try again. Teams then paddled back to the mainland and the dam.
- From the dam's bridge, teams threw a bucket with a rope attached off the side to fill it with water from below then pulled it back up. They then had to transfer the water to a second leaky bucket and quickly run it to the other side of the bridge to pour it into a glass box. Once the box was filled enough that a bottle of Sting Energy Drink floated to the top, they received the clue for the Roadblock.

=== Leg 2 (Yên Bái) ===
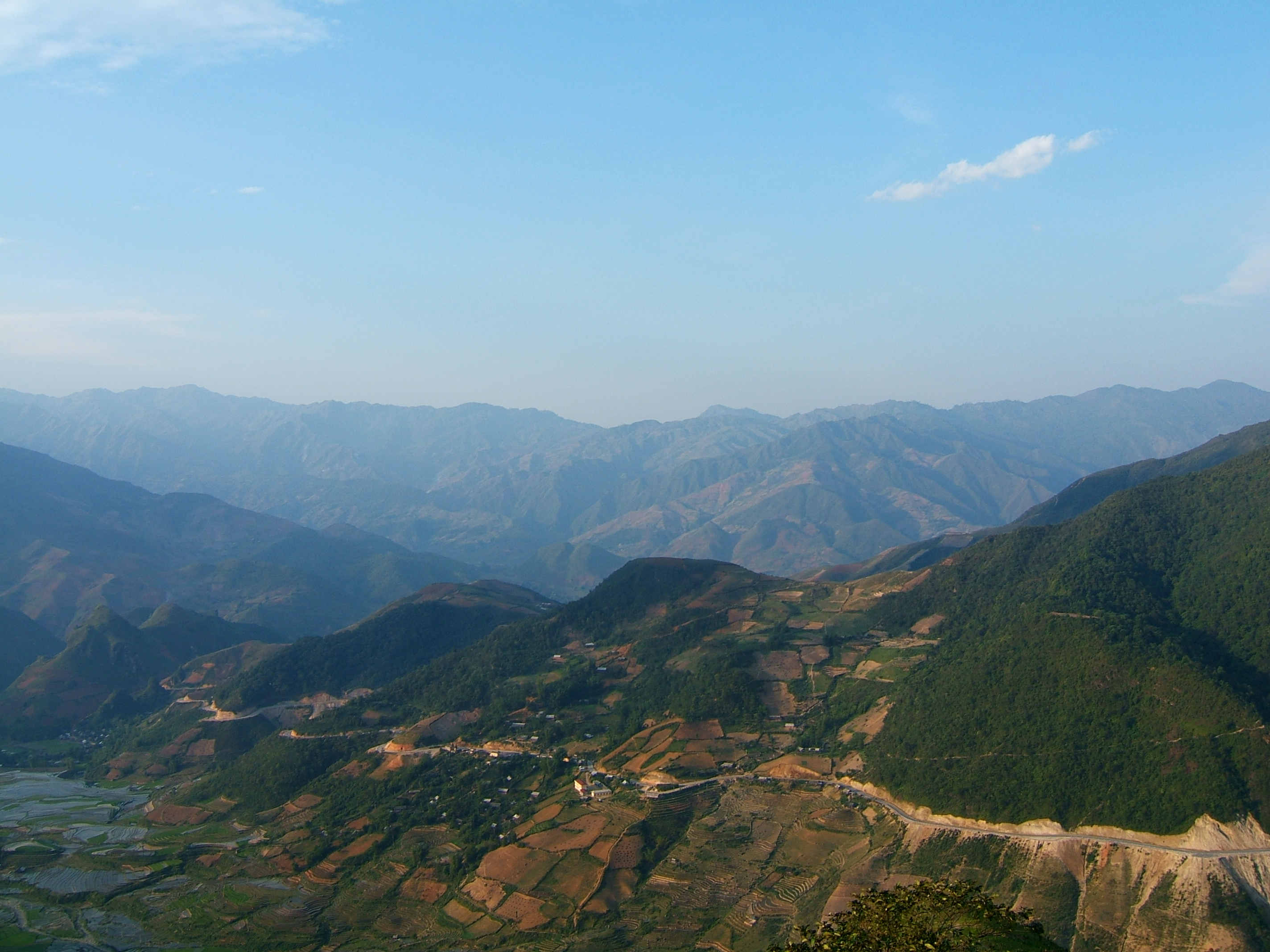
The second leg in Yên Bái Province concluded at Khau Phạ Pass.

Airdate: 7 April 2016

- Tú Lệ, Mù Cang Chải (Specified House)
- Tú Lệ (Village Bridge)
- Tú Lệ (Village Farm)
- Tú Lệ (Chief's House)
- Lìm Mông (Khau Phạ Pass)

In this leg's Roadblock, one team member had to cross a series of rings suspended beneath the village bridge to retrieve the Detour clue on the other side. If they fell into the river below, they had to go to the back of the line and try again.

This season's first Detour was a choice between Eat or Make, which both took place at a village farm. In Eat, teams had to use bamboo poles and a campfire to traditionally cook three orders of rice to a judge's satisfaction to receive their next clue. In Make, teams had to fully cover a wooden bovine skeleton in hay to create a sculpture. Once approved, they received their next clue.

Additional tasks

- Teams had to travel by motorcycle to the village of Tú Lệ and search for one house with a sticker of The Amazing Race Vietnam logo on the fence.
- After the Detour, teams carried two buckets from the village chief's house to the local water supply and filled them with water. They had to transport the buckets using shoulder harnesses across the uneven paths through the village back to the chief to receive their next clue. If they spilled too much water on the way, they would incur a time penalty at the Pit Stop.

=== Leg 3 (Yên Bái → Lào Cai) ===
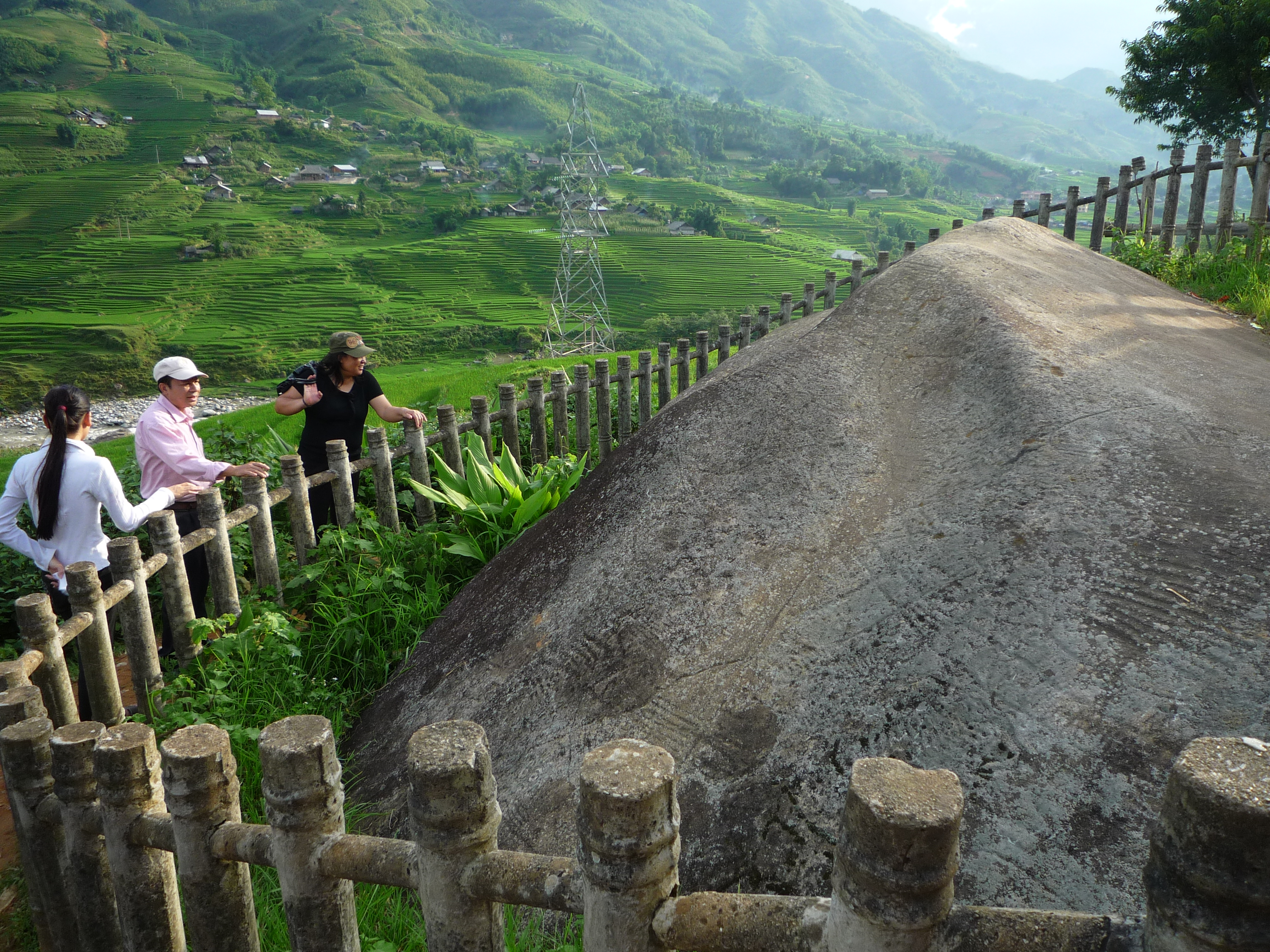
Teams visited the Ancient Stone Field of Sa Pa while in the Lào Cai Province.

Airdate: 14 April 2016

- Mù Cang Chải (Raspberry Hill)
- Sa Pa, Lào Cai Province (Sapa Ancient Stone Field (in Vietnamese))
- Y Tý (Town Limits)
- Y Tý (Town Centre) (Overnight Rest)
- Y Tý (Farm)
- Y Tý (San Bai Mountain)

This leg's Detour was a choice between Loaf or Hair, which both took place in Y Tý town centre. In Loaf, teams had to use traditional methods and tools to make a Vietnamese glutinous rice cake called a Bánh giầy to receive their next clue. In Hair, teams had to make a traditional wig by weaving string together in the style of braided hair, then dying it with an herb mixture and heating it over an open flame to receive their next clue.

Additional tasks

- At Raspberry Hill, teams were shown a photograph of a location that they had to memorize and find. Once there, they had to take a photograph that was identical to the one shown to receive their next clue.
- At the Sapa Ancient Stone Field, teams searched the field for keys to a provided decoder device with individually rotating parts. Then, using hints written on stones scattered throughout the field, they had to decipher a six-word phrase to receive their next clue.
- At the Y Tý town limits, teams had to collect and carry a bundle of firewood – 10 kilograms (22 lb) for women, 15 kilograms (33 lb) for men. However, if they could remember the phrase from the previous task, they could each lighten their bundle by one kilogram (2.2 lb). Using a provided stick and some rope, they had to transport their firewood on foot six kilometres (3.7 mi) to the centre of town to receive the clue for the Detour.
- After the Detour, teams traveled to a nearby farm and took turns riding a device resembling a rotating seesaw, sitting on opposite sides. If both team members performed a full 360° rotation in succession without touching the ground more than once, either team member could reach up to grab a clue hanging overhead.

=== Leg 4 (Lào Cai → Hà Nam → Nam Định) ===
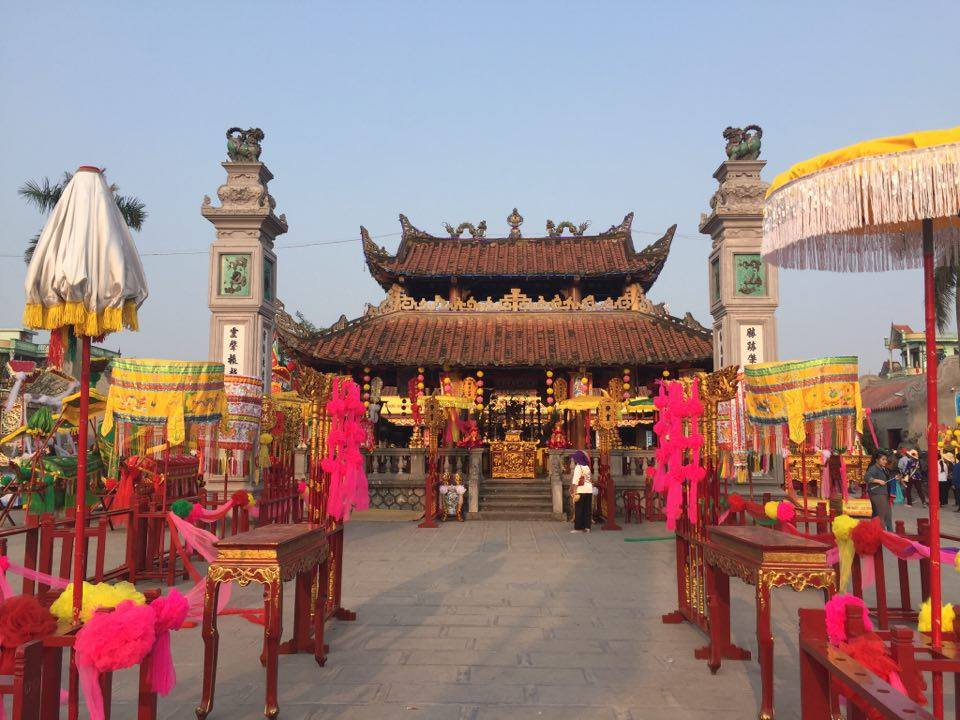
At the Phủ Dầy Temple in Nam Định Province, teams had to recreate Chinese characterss using a group of children.

Airdate: 21 April 2016

- Đọi Sơn, Hà Nam Province (Trống Đọi Tam)
- Đọi Sơn (Ancestor Temple)
- Đại Hoàng (Bá Kiến's House)
- Kim Thai, Nam Định Province (Phủ Dầy Temple (in Vietnamese))
- Nam Định (Nam Định Museum)

This leg's Detour was a choice between Make 'n Play or Drum 'n Shout, which both took place at Trống Đọi Tam. In Make 'n Play, teams had to use provided materials to build a traditional Vietnamese drum. This included using a winch and the weight of a team member to stretch the skin over the top of the barrel. Once approved, they received their next clue. In Drum 'n Shout, teams listened to a performance by a duo of musicians, who sang and played small drums and erhu. They then had to correctly match the lyrics and drum rhythm, accompanied by erhu, to receive their next clue.

Additional tasks

- After the Detour, teams found the U-Turn board at Ancestor Temple.
- The clue after the U-Turn instructed teams to travel to Bá Kiến's House, where they had to recreate the Vietnamese short story Chí Phèo and Thị Nở. Dressed as the titular characters, they had to prepare and then simultaneously cook numerous pots of congee using a long cooking tray and lighting a fire underneath that is the full length of the tray. Once ready, each team member had to feed the other a dish of the soup to receive their next clue. They would receive a time penalty of 10 minutes at the Pit Stop for each pot that was improperly cooked.
- At Phủ Dầy Temple, teams had to choose one of four Chinese characters and arrange a group of children to form the shape of the character, with one team member directing their partner from above, to receive their next clue. Each character required a specified number of children.

=== Leg 5 (Nam Định → Thừa Thiên Huế) ===
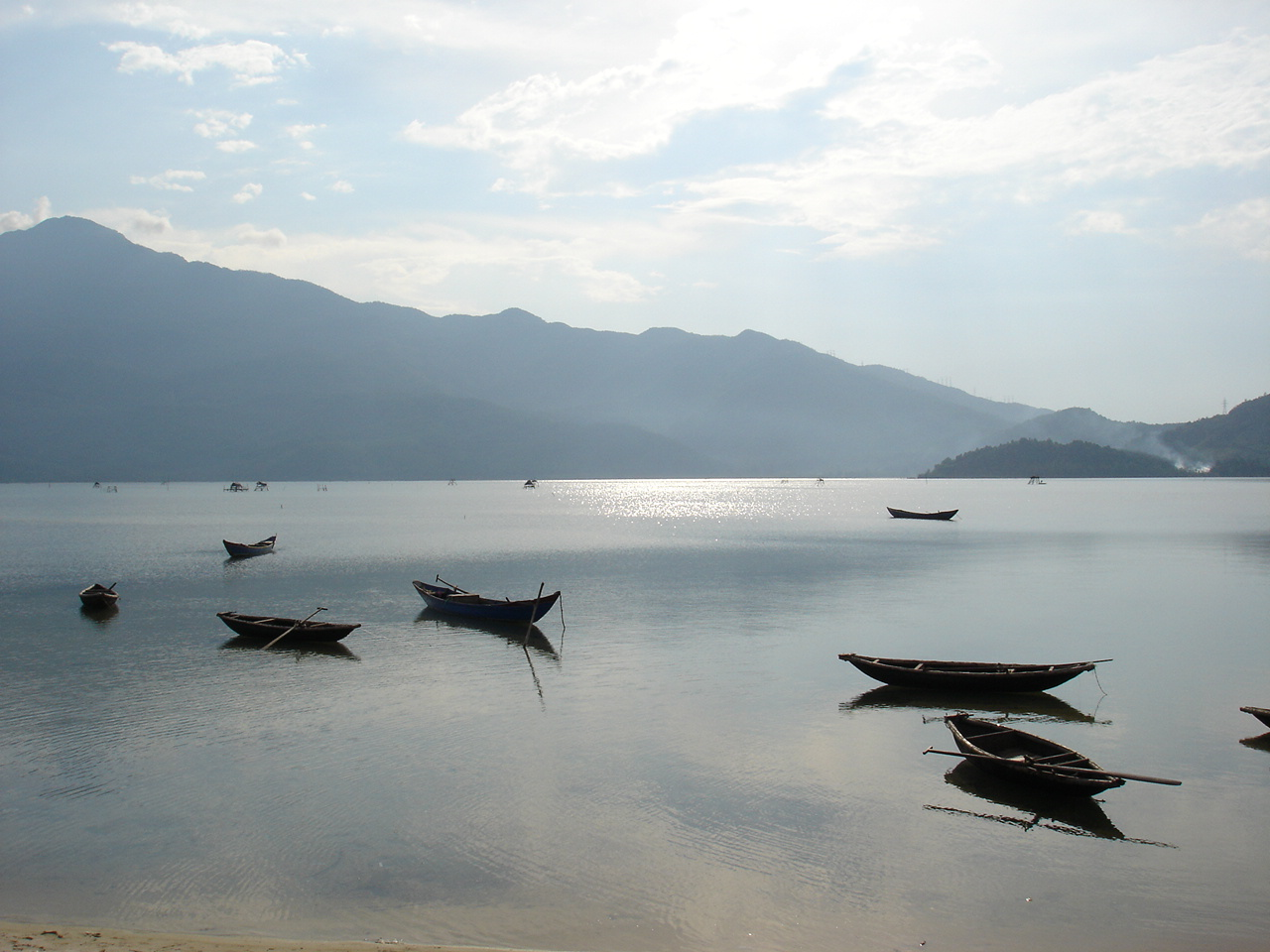
After leaving Huế, teams visited the Tam Giang lagoon.

Airdate: 28 April 2016

- Nam Định (Nam Định Railway Station) to Huế, Thừa Thiên Huế Province (Huế Railway Station)
- Huế (Imperial City)
- Huế (February 3 Park or Trường Sanh Palace)
- Huế (Phong Phu Plaza – Lotteria)
- Sịa (Tam Giang Lagoon)
- Lăng Cô (Hải Vân Pass)

This leg's Detour was a choice between Fly or Graceful. In Fly, teams traveled to February 3 Park, where they had to assemble, paint, and fly a butterfly kite to receive their next clue . In Graceful, teams traveled to Trường Sanh Palace, where they had to dress in full costume and take part in a Hát tuồng performance to receive their next clue.

Additional tasks

- After arriving in Huế, teams made their way to Imperial City, where there were many woman walking around in traditional clothing. One held their next clue, but would hand it to another as they passed. They had to search for the one currently holding their clue and interact with them without speaking to them to receive the clue, which was for the Detour.
- After the Detour, teams traveled to the Lotteria fast food restaurant in Phong Phu Plaza, where they had to wear a chef's hat and prepare hamburgers to the restaurant's specifications to receive their next clue.
- At Tam Giang Lagoon, where they had to use a traditional fishing net and a sampan to fish plastic balls out of the water. Once they collected fifteen balls, they received their next clue.

=== Leg 6 (Thừa Thiên Huế → Phú Yên) ===
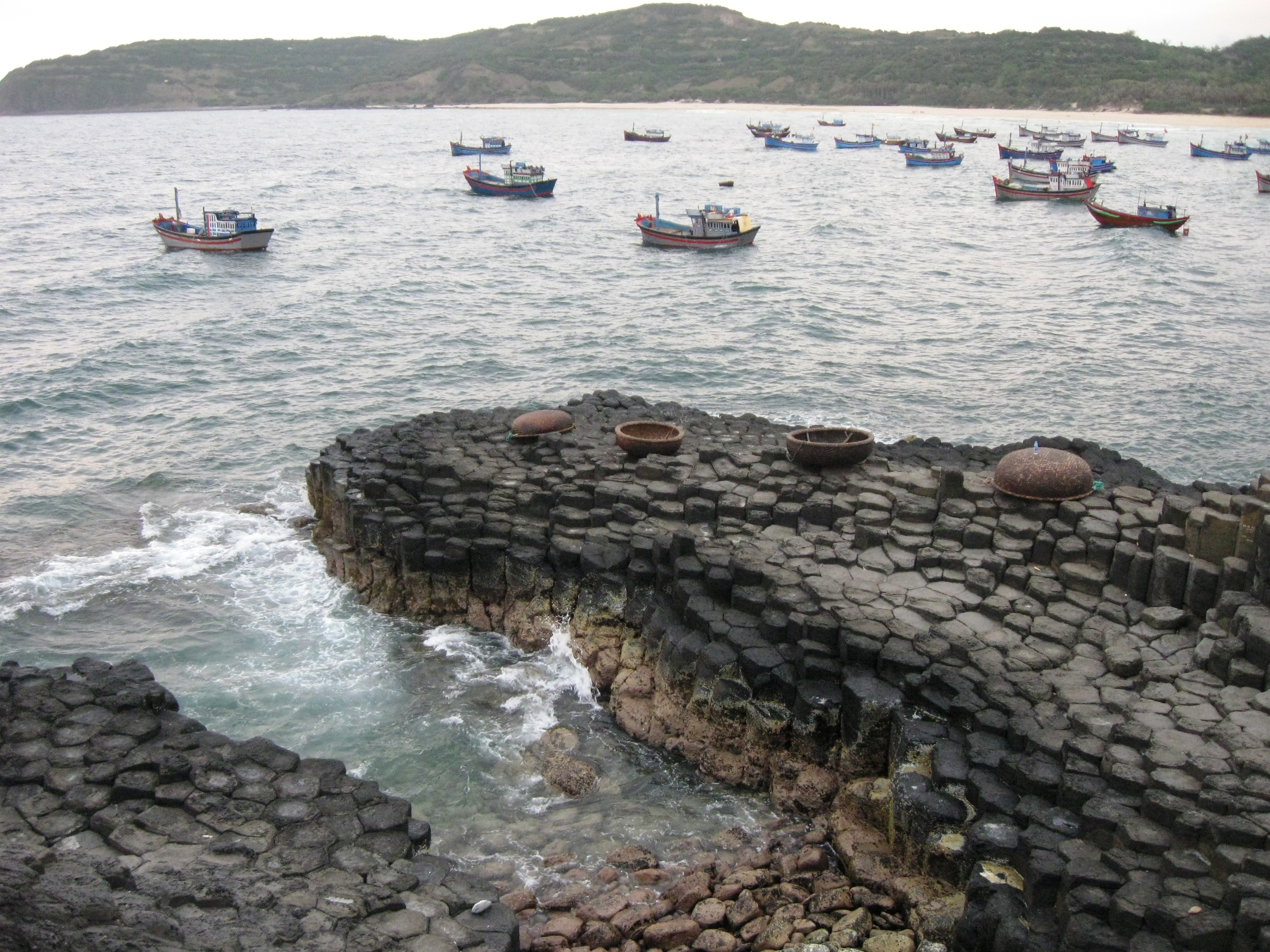
Teams ended their leg in Phú Yên Province at Ghềnh Đá Đĩa.

Airdate: 5 May 2016

- Tuy Hòa, Phú Yên Province (April 1 Square)
- Sông Cầu (Coconut Plantation)
- An Ninh Tây (Miếu Ông Cọp or Bình Bá River)
- An Ninh Tây (Wooden Bridge)
- Thôn Phú Hạnh (Bàng Beach)
- Thôn Phú Hạnh (Ghềnh Đá Đĩa)

In this leg's Roadblock, one team member had to climb to the top of a coconut tree, using only their hands and feet, and pull off one coconut to receive the clue for the Detour.

This leg's Detour was a choice between Learn or Do. In Learn, teams traveled to Miếu Ông Cọp, where they had to learn a series of intricate animal poses and actions and correctly perform their in succession to receive their next clue. In Do, teams traveled to Bình Bá River, where they had to use an ancient winch to fully raise a large fishing net out of the water to receive their next clue.

Additional tasks

- After the Detour, teams made their way to a large wooden bridge nearby. Using a stick and a small woven cage, one team member had to guide a single duck all the way across the bridge, keeping it from jumping into the water, while their partner had to cross the bridge carrying a basket of coconuts on their head. Once both fully across, they carried the duck back to the other side to exchange for their next clue.
- At Bàng Beach, one team member had to toss three paint-filled water balloons through a suspended thorn-covered ring and into a basket on their partner's head to receive their next clue.

=== Leg 7 (Phú Yên → Đồng Nai → Bà Rịa-Vũng Tàu) ===
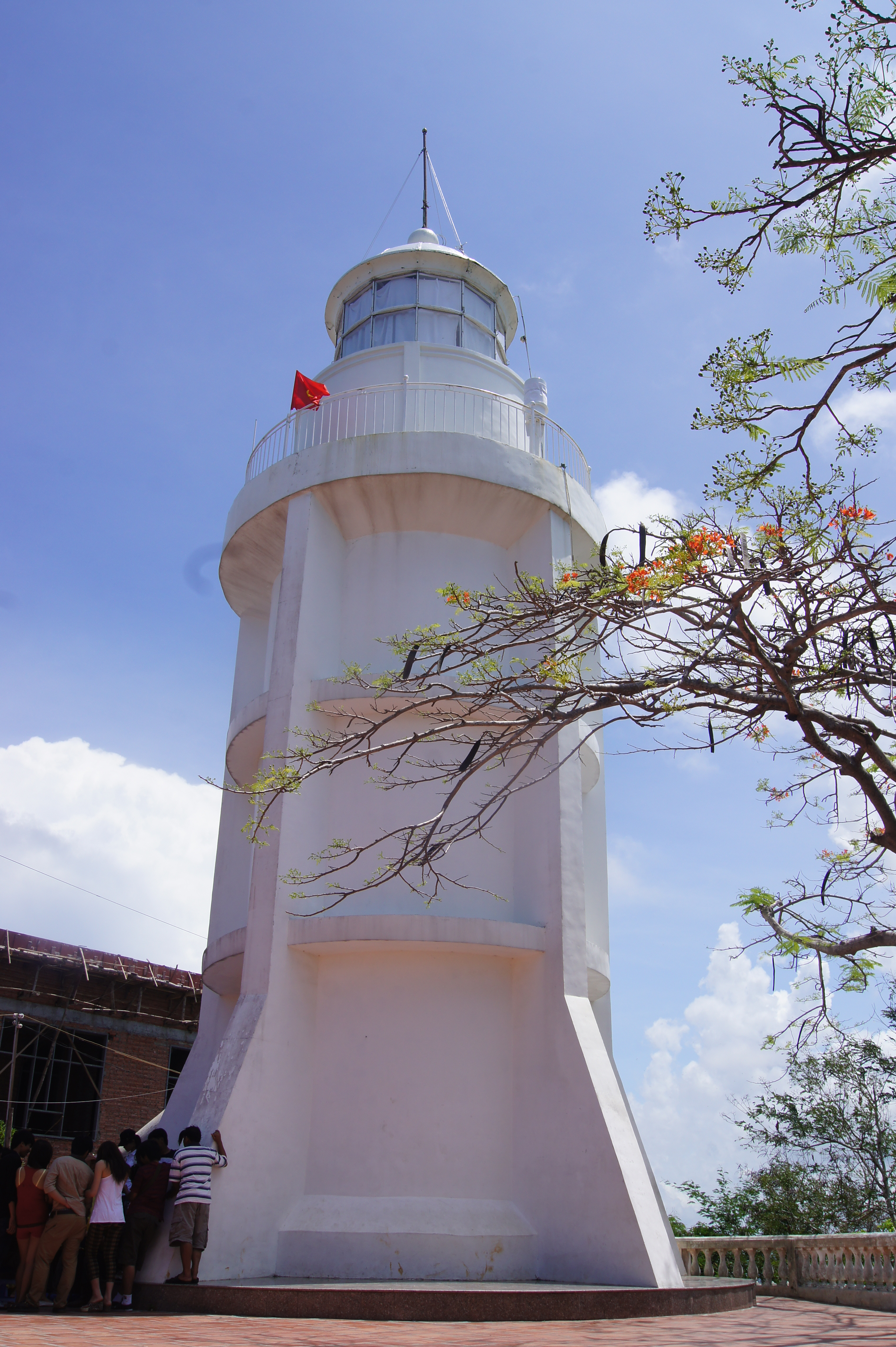
The lighthouse in Vũng Tàu served as the seventh Pit Stop.

Airdate: 12 May 2016

- Tuy Hòa to Biên Hòa, Đồng Nai Province
- Biên Hòa (Pho Hung Restaurant)
- Long Sơn, Bà Rịa–Vũng Tàu Province (Salt Farm or Lê Văn Ánh's House)
- Long Sơn (Liên Hoàn Obstacle Course)
- Long Sơn (Mr. Tâm's House)
- Vũng Tàu (Thuy Van Beach)
- Vũng Tàu (Vietsovpetro Port)
- Vũng Tàu (Vũng Tàu Lighthouse (in Vietnamese))

In this leg's first Roadblock, one team member had to eat an entire five-kilogram (11 lb) bowl of pho within 45 minutes to receive the clue for the Detour. If they didn't finish, they would still receive their clue once the 45 minutes were up, but they would incur a time penalty at the Pit Stop, the length dependent on how much the team member ate.

This leg's Detour was a choice between Salt or Fish. In Salt, teams traveled to a salt farm, where they had to harvest five wheelbarrows full of salt to receive their next clue. In Fish, teams traveled to Lê Văn Ánh's House, where one team member would be blindfolded. Following directions from their partner, they had to enter the mud flats and catch three giant mudskippers with their bare hands to receive their next clue.

In this leg's second Roadblock, the team member who did not perform the previous Roadblock had to complete a three-part obstacle course. First, they had to ride a bicycle across a thin and bumpy wooden bridge. Then, they had to swim under a series of ropes through muddy water without touching any of the ropes. Finally, they had to stand on a raised log and attempt to knock an opponent off the log, each using sandbags, the racer being given three attempts to do so. If they completed the course, they received their next clue. If they failed any part of the course, they would have to start over.

Additional tasks

- After the second Roadblock, one team member had to cross a rickety bamboo bridge, weighted down by their partner, to retrieve their next clue on the other side and then hand it to their partner.
- At Thuy Van Beach, teams had to find and convince a local to wash them in the ocean until they completely use up a bar of soap, after which they received their next clue.
- At Vietsovpetro Port, teams had to stack milk crates high enough to reach a clue hanging overhead. One member would be on top of the baskets stacking them as their partner handed them baskets from the ground.

=== Leg 8 (Bà Rịa-Vũng Tàu) ===
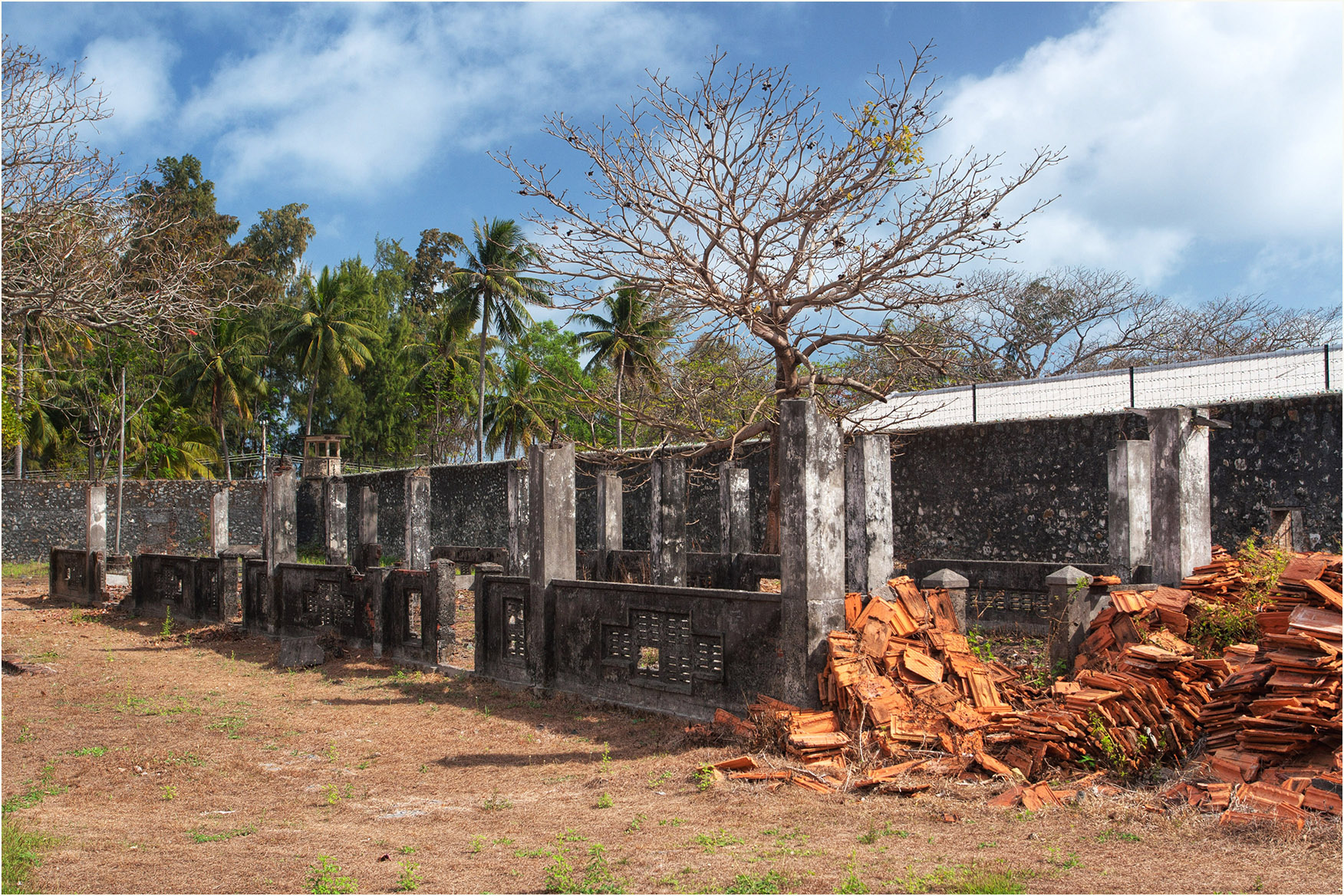
The Detour on the island of Côn Đảo took place at the Phu Tuong Prison.

Airdate: 19 May 2016

- Ho Chi Minh City (Tan Son Nhat International Airport) to Côn Đảo (Con Dao Airport)
  - Côn Đảo (Nhát Beach)
- Côn Đảo (Đất Dốc Beach)
- Côn Đảo (Bãy Cạnh)
- Côn Đảo (Phu Tuong Prison)
- Côn Đảo (Ông Đụng Beach)
- Côn Đảo (Van Son Pagoda)
- Côn Đảo (Historic Pier 914)

In this season's only Fast Forward, one team member had to put on snorkeling gear and swim a long distance from the beach to a boat anchored far offshore, then dive down to retrieve a briefcase from beneath an attached raft. The other team member had to solve a math problem without using calculator or taking notes, the result of which is the password of the briefcase. After returning to their partner on shore with the briefcase, they received a phone call from host Huy Khanh, who offered them VND60 million (approx. US$2,650) to immediately quit the race, or bring the briefcase to the Pit Stop, where he would make the same offer again, this time for VND150 million (approx. US$6,620).

In this leg's Roadblock, after traveling to a designated offshore location by boat, one team member had to put on snorkeling gear and dive down to the coral reef, where they would collect as many oysters as they could find on the sea floor, then return to the boat to open them. Some oysters contained a white pearl, some contained a black pearl. If they didn't find three black pearls, they had to wait out a 15-minute time penalty before diving again. Otherwise, they received their next clue.

This leg's Detour was a choice between Knock Knock or Melting Time, both taking place in Phu Tuong Prison. In Knock Knock, teams learned how to communicate in Morse code. They were then locked in adjacent cells. One team member received a message to relay to their partner by knocking it in Morse Code on the wall. If their partner understood the message correctly, they received their next clue. In Melting Time, one team member was locked in a cell, and had to stand on continuously on a block of ice for five minutes, then rest for five minutes, repeating for the duration of the task. Meanwhile, their partner had to draw at random to determine the type of spoon they could use to dig the cell key out of a large block of ice. Upon retrieving the key, they unlocked their partner's cell and received their next clue.

Additional tasks

- Upon arrival at Con Dao Airport, teams found their next clue outside of the airport, which also contained the Fast Forward clue.
- At Ông Đụng Beach, teams used rope to pull a heavy box filled with rocks with water. At the bottom of the box was their next clue. Not all boxes had a clue, if the team pulled in a box that did not have a clue, they had to wait five minutes before trying again.
- At Van Son Pagoda, one team member had to memorize a Vietnamese poem while wearing headphones listening to distracting music and walking up the steps of the temple. They then had to teach the poem to their partner, who was waiting at the top and blindfolded. The partner is not allowed to speak to the first team member. If the partner correctly recited the poem, they received their next clue.

Additional notes

- At Con Dao Airport, teams found bicycles that would serve as their transportation, which they had to keep for a majority of this leg. The team that chose to go for the Fast Forward were provided extra money for travel, and did not have to use a bicycle.
- After completing the task at Ông Đụng Beach, all teams were provided extra money for travel in their next clue, and no longer had to keep their bicycle.

=== Leg 9 (Bà Rịa-Vũng Tàu → Australia) ===
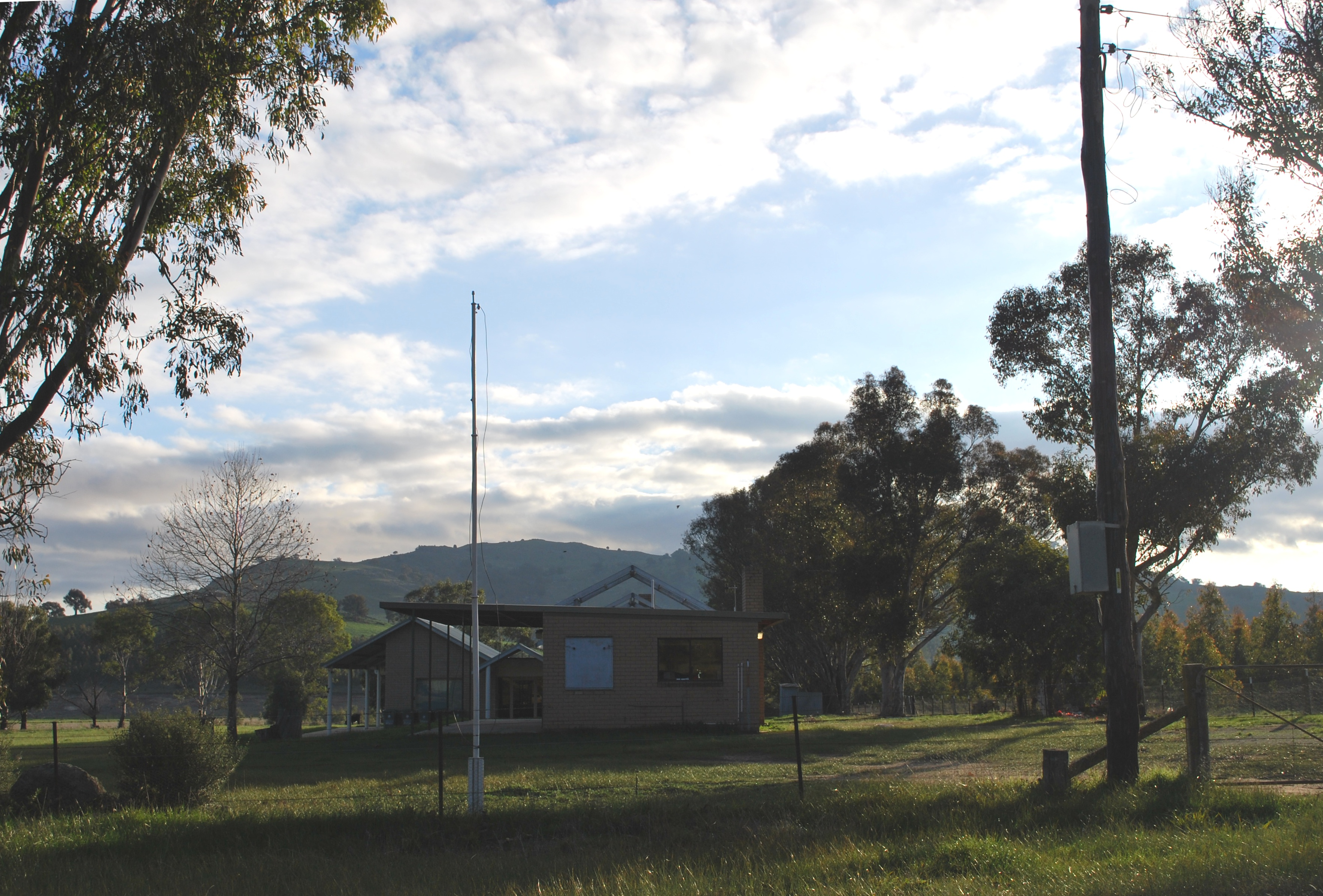
Teams visited the town of Wymah during their leg in Australia.

Airdate: 26 May 2016

- Con Dao (Con Dao Airport) to Melbourne, Victoria, Australia (Melbourne Airport)
- Melbourne (Melbourne Airport to Docklands – Southern Cross Railway Station)
- Melbourne (Docklands – Southern Cross Railway Station) to Yarrawonga (Yarrawonga Railway Station)
- Yarrawonga (Yarrawonga Airport) (Task Cancelled)
- Mulwala, New South Wales (Max Kirwan Lakes Park)
- Wymah (Wymah Ranch)
- Bowna (Great Aussie Park)

There was to be a Roadblock on this leg involving one team member piloting and landing an ultralight aircraft, but due to the death of a cameraman and pilot as noted in the Development section above, this task was canceled and teams were moved onto the next location. It was not mentioned in the episode.

Additional tasks

- At Max Kirwan Lakes Park, team water skied behind a speedboat. Both team members had to remain standing until the boat passed a series of marked buoys. If one fell, they had to try again. Once completed, they were taken to shore near their next clue box.
- At Wymah Ranch, there was a multi-part task. First, teams dressed in the body paint of Indigenous Australians. One team member learned how to play the didgeridoo while their partner learned a traditional dance ritual. Once both were completed to the judge's satisfaction, they received their next clue. Teams then made their way to the ranch's sheep pens and entered one of the pens, where they had to count the correct number of sheep (between 123 and 129) to receive their next clue. Finally, they had to enter a different sheep pen, where four of the sheep were wearing a ribbon corresponding to each team's designated colour. They then had to herd the sheep of their respective colour into a third pen to receive their next clue.
- At Great Aussie Park, both team members had to balance on rolling logs and hit a bullseye on a target using a bow in archery to receive their next clue.

=== Leg 10 (Australia → Ho Chi Minh City) ===
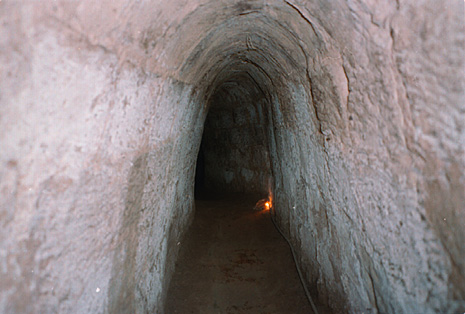
The first task of the penultimate leg took place at the Củ Chi Tunnels.

Airdate: 2 June 2016

- Albury (Albury Railway Station) to Melbourne, Victoria (City Centre – Flinders Street Railway Station)
- Melbourne (Melbourne Airport) to Ho Chi Minh City, Vietnam (Tan Son Nhat International Airport)
- Phú Hiệp (Củ Chi Tunnels)
- An Phú (Mot Thoang Tourist Area)

For their Speed Bump, Pha Lê & Hà Việt Dũng each had to place 10 metal nuts onto a chopstick, then both stack all 10 on top of each other without the stack falling over before they could continue racing.

This leg's Detour was a choice between Knit or Carry. In Knit, teams had to weave together a traditional Vietnamese basket to receive their next clue. In Carry, teams had to carry heavy hay bales to a marked area and build a haystack 2 metres (6.6 ft) in diameter and 2.5 metres (8.2 ft) high to receive their next clue.

Additional tasks

- At the Củ Chi Tunnels, teams had to put on blindfolds and enter the tunnels to search for flashlights. Once found, they would return to the entrance and would find a pair of heavy sacks to haul through the tunnels and through the nearby woods to receive their next clue.
- At the entrance to the Mot Thoang Tourist Area, teams had to dress in large sumo wrestling costumes and face off in a sumo match, on a soap-filled arena, against one of two previous The Amazing Race Vietnam winning teams - either Baggio & Thành Phúc of Season 1, or Ngọc Anh & Nhật Anh of Season 4. If they could force both of their opponents out of the ring, they received the Detour clue.
- After the Detour, teams received a set of photographs of Vietnamese landmarks and corresponding tags identifying them. They had to match the tags to the correct photographs and place them in the correct locations on a large Vietnamese map. If any were incorrect, they would be told how many. After failing the task twice, they could look at an answer sheet to memorize before trying again. Once all were correct, they could make their way to the nearby Pit Stop.

Additional note

- Upon arrival in Ho Chi Minh City, teams found small motorized bicycles that served as their transportation for this leg.

=== Leg 11 (Ho Chi Minh City) ===
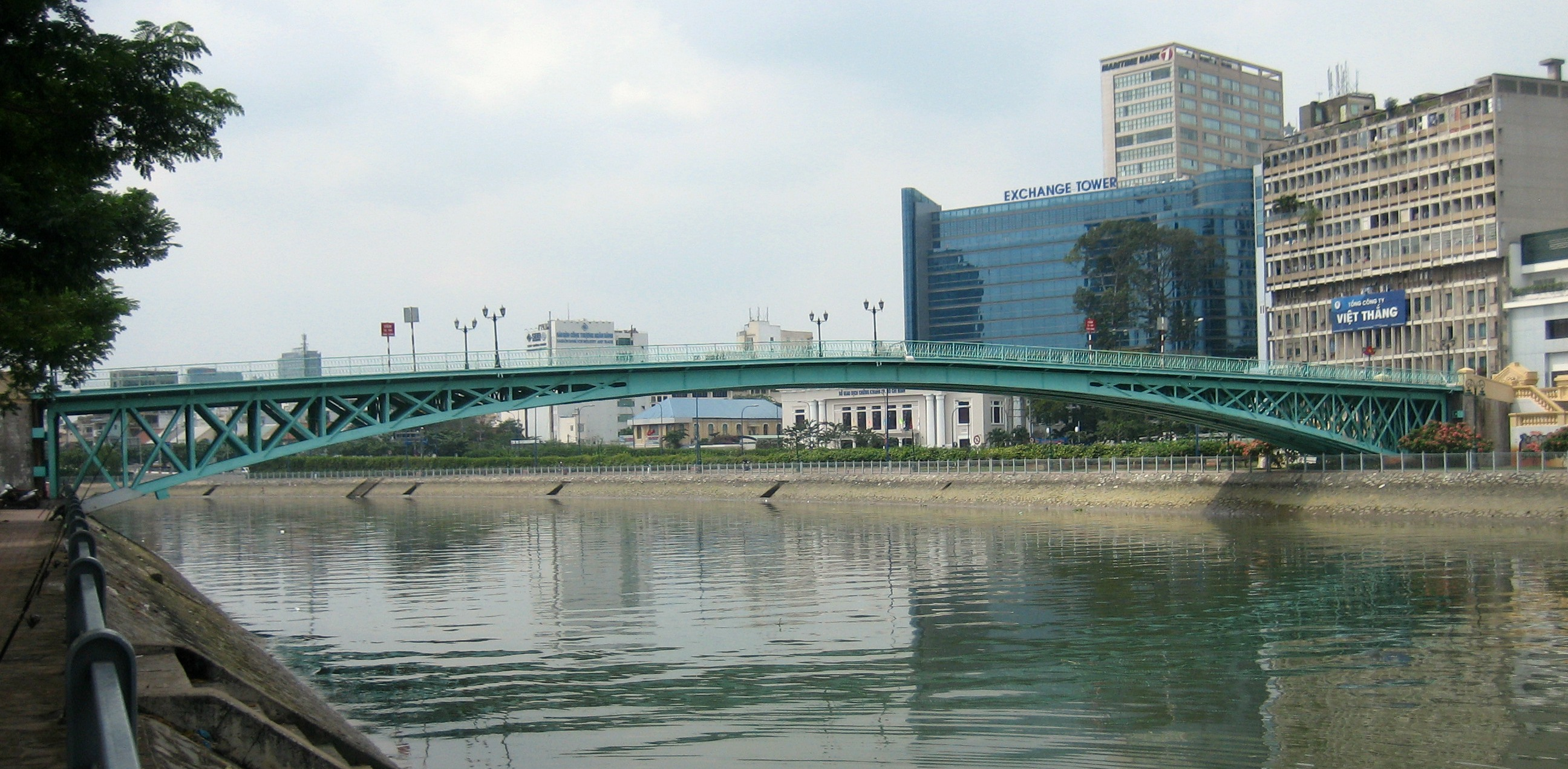
The Mong Bridge in Ho Chi Minh City served as the Finish Line for The Amazing Race Vietnam 2016.

Airdate: 9 June 2016

- Ho Chi Minh City (Saigon Zoo and Botanical Gardens)
- Ho Chi Minh City (Notre Dame Cathedral)
- Ho Chi Minh City (Tao Đàn Park)
- Ho Chi Minh City (Ho Chi Minh City Circus or Chuồn Chuồn Giấy Club)
- Ho Chi Minh City (Nguyễn Huệ Promenade)
- Ho Chi Minh City (5 Nguyễn Tất Thành Street)
- Ho Chi Minh City (Mong Bridge)

This season's final Detour was a choice between Circus or Drama. In Circus, teams traveled to the Ho Chi Minh City Circus, where one team member had to walk across a circus tightrope while their partner launched themselves onto a trapeze and swung to reach their next clue on the ceiling. In Drama, teams traveled to Chuồn Chuồn Giấy Club, where they had to dress in elaborate costumes and perform a short comedy-drama skit to the approval of the judge to receive their next clue.

In this leg's first Roadblock, one team member had to ride a self-balancing scooter and maintain their balance while navigating through a maze of Sting Energy Drink cans and cases. They had to make their way to four specific points within the maze to pick up a can of Sting at each. If they collected and four and then reached the centre of the maze within an allotted time limit, they could retrieve the clue for the second Roadblock.

In this season's final Roadblock, one team member had to climb to the top of a rock-climbing wall attached to the side of an upturned shipping container, then climb a rope to the top of a giant Sting Energy Drink can, all within an allotted time limit, to receive their final clue.

Additional tasks

- At the beginning of the leg, teams made their way to Saigon Zoo and Botanical Gardens to find their next clue outside the zoo entrance.
- On the grounds outside Notre Dame Cathedral, teams had to search through a large crowd for one of three people carrying a briefcase bearing The Amazing Race Vietnam logo, which contained their next clue.
- At Tao Đàn Park, teams had to dress in provided clothing and props, and then apply metallic-coloured paint to themselves, to become living statues matching example photographs. They then had to pose and convince locals to take photographs with them, 10 photographs in total, including some with men, women, children, and elders, to receive the Detour clue.
