= Miss International Queen 2025 =

Transgender beauty pageant in Thailand

- Date: 20 September 2025
- Presenters: Luke Ishikawa Plowden, Saraichatt Jirapatt
- Theme: Beyond Beauty
- Venue: Tiffany's Show Pattaya, Pattaya, Chonburi, Thailand
- Broadcaster: Channel 3
- Entrants: 23
- Placements: 12
- Debuts: Czech Republic
- Withdrawals: Bolivia; Cambodia; Canada; El Salvador; India
- Returns: Chile; Cuba; Nicaragua; Turkey
- Winner: Midori Monét; United States
- Congeniality: Olivia Lauren; Cuba
- Photogenic: Preeyakorn Pohnprom; Thailand

Miss International Queen 2025 was the 19th Miss International Queen pageant, held at the Tiffany's Show Pattaya in Pattaya, Chonburi, Thailand on 20 September 2025.

At the end of the event, Catalina Marsano of Peru crowned Midori Monét of United States as her successor. It is the third victory of the United States in the pageant.

== Results ==
=== Placements ===
Placement	Contestant
Miss International Queen 2025	United States – Midori Monét ★
1st Runner-Up	Cuba – Olivia Lauren
2nd Runner-Up	Vietnam - Hà Tâm Như
Top 6	Ecuador – Reyna Morocho; Laos – Taneung Chanthasenesack; Philippines – Anne Patricia Lorenzo ☆
Top 12	Brazil – Isabella Pamplona; Japan – Mina Amamatsu; Malaysia – Khleo Ambrose; Nicaragua – Tiffany Colleman; Thailand – Preeyakorn Pohnprom; Venezuela – Ashlyn Pia

Notes:

- ★ – Straight into the top 12 by winning the Preliminary Best Performance award
- ☆ – Straight into the top 12 by winning the Best Social Influencer award

== Special awards ==
Award	Contestant
Preliminary Best Performance	United States – Midori Monét
Best in Talent	Laos – Taneung Chanthasenesack
Best National Costume	United States – Midori Monét
Best Social Influencer	Philippines – Anne Patricia Lorenzo Diaz
Miss Photogenic	Thailand – Preeyakorn Pohnprom
Miss Congeniality	Cuba – Olivia Lauren
Miss Elegant Face	Ecuador – Reyna Morocho
Miss Golden Shape	Malaysia – Khleo Ambrose
Miss Perfect Skin	Laos – Taneung Chanthasenesack
The Future of Beauty	Cuba – Olivia Lauren
Wansiri Inspiring Beauty	Philippines – Anne Patricia Lorenzo Diaz

=== Best in Talent ===
Award	Contestant
Winner	Laos – Taneung Chanthasenesack
1st Runner-Up	United States – Midori Monét
2nd Runner-Up	Vietnam – Hà Tâm Như

== Pageant ==
=== Format ===
All of the contestants were competed in their evening gown. Ten semi-finalists were chosen by the judges from the preliminary competition that consists of the swimsuit, evening gown competition, and stage interviews. Two were chosen to advance in the final by winning a fast-track award, Best Preliminary Performance award and Best Social Influencer awards. Each of the twelve semi-finalists were then competed in the swimsuit competition. Following the swimsuit competition, six contestants were shortlisted to advance to the question-and-answer session. From six, three contestants were chosen to advance to the final interview.

=== Selection committee ===
- Dr. Thep Vechavisit – Managing director Patunam Polyclinic
- Dr. Thanavatt Chotima – President Thai Association and Academy of Cosmetic Surgery and Medicine
- Dr. Saran Wannachamras – Chief executive officer of Wansiri Hospital
- Kathy Heinecke – President of Spousal Incentive Program Minor International
- Patravadi Mejudhon – Actress, playwright, television director
- Haruna Ai – Miss International Queen 2009 from Japan
- Mini Han – Miss International Queen 2010 from South Korea
- Isabella Santiago – Miss International Queen 2014 from Venezuela
- Valentina Fluchaire – Miss International Queen 2020 from Mexico
- Fuschia Anne Ravena – Miss International Queen 2022 from the Philippines
- Solange Dekker – Miss International Queen 2023 from the Netherlands

== Contestants ==
Twenty-three contestants competed for the title:

Country/territory	Contestant	Age (Note: Age at the time of the pageant)	Hometown
Brazil	Isabella Pamplona	32	Amazonas
Chile	Regina Gerbier	33	Miami
China	Whisper Lyu	21	Liaoning
Colombia	Valeria Palacio	29	Bogotá
Cuba	Olivia Lauren	22	Havana
Czech Republic	Martina Sobková	20	Prague
Ecuador	Reyna Morocho	21	Guayaquil
Japan	Mina Amamatsu	24	Osaka
Indonesia	Kaycia Lee	36	Jakarta
Laos	Taneung Chanthasenesack	20	Sainyabuli
Malaysia	Khleo Ambrose	27	Sabah
Mexico	Alanna Cordero	30	Villahermosa
Myanmar	MJ Pan Aung	21	Yangon
Nicaragua	Tiffany Colleman	31	Managua
Peru	Lesly Quispe	33	Lima
Philippines	Anne Patricia Lorenzo	34	Manila
Puerto Rico	Leeann Nicole Seda	30	Mayaguez
Taiwan	Tiffany Queen	26	Taipei
Thailand	Preeyakorn Pohnprom	28	Chonburi
Turkey	Elif Nilay	24	Iğdır
United States	Midori Monét	25	Seattle
Venezuela	Ashlyn Pia	18	Caracas
Vietnam	Hà Tâm Như	27	Vĩnh Long
