= Miss International Queen Vietnam 2023 =

- Date: 8 April 2023
- Presenters: Đức Bảo; Đỗ Nhật Hà
- Venue: Ho Chi Minh City, Vietnam
- Entrants: 20
- Placements: 10
- Winner: Nguyễn Hà Dịu Thảo; Hải Dương
- Best National Costume: Đỗ Tây Hà; Tây Ninh

Miss International Queen Vietnam 2023 is the third edition of Miss International Queen Vietnam pageant, was held on 8 April 2023, in Hồ Chí Minh City. Vietnam.

Phùng Trương Trân Đài of California crowned her successor Nguyễn Hà Dịu Thảo of Hải Dương at the end of the event.

Nguyễn Hương Giang, Hoàng Thị Thùy, Rinrada Thurapan, Fuchsia Anne Ravena, Lukkade Metinee is a judge for the competition. Chế Châu, Mai Ngô, Bùi Quỳnh Hoa và Huỳnh Phạm Thủy Tiên is a mentor for the competition.

== Final results ==
Placement	Candidate	International beauty pageant
Miss International Queen Vietnam 2023	55 — Nguyễn Hà Dịu Thảo	Top 11 – Miss International Queen 2023
1st runner-up	50 — Nguyễn Tường San	2nd Runner-Up – Miss International Queen 2024
2nd runner-up	39 — Nguyễn An Nhi
Top 6	01 — Nguyễn Đan Tiên; 13 — Nguyễn Vũ Hà Anh (§)
Top 6	41 — Nguyễn Trang Nhung (¥)	Winner – Miss Equality World 2024
Top 10	18 — Trần Mỹ Quân; 19 — Nguyễn Thiên Hân; 61 — Mỹm Trần
Top 10	07 — Đỗ Tây Hà	4th Runner-Up – Miss Equality World 2023

Note

- §: The winner of the Most Popular Vote award goes straight to the Top 10
- ¥: Contestants advance to the Finals by winning the Best Talent award

== Contestants ==
Candidate	Age	Height	Hometown
Nguyễn Đan Tiên	1999	168 m (551 ft 2 in)	Bắc Giang
Nikkie Song Phúc	1998	173 m (567 ft 7 in)	Hồ Chí Minh City
Đỗ Tây Hà	1993	173 m (567 ft 7 in)	Tây Ninh
Nguyễn Vũ Hà Anh	1997	172 m (564 ft 3 1/2 in)	Bắc Giang
Quincy Lê	2001	172 m (564 ft 3 1/2 in)	
Trần Mỹ Quân	2003	170 m (557 ft 9 in)	An Giang
Nguyễn Thiên Hân	1996	176 m (577 ft 5 in)	Đồng Nai
Chung Khiết Anh	2001	172 m (564 ft 3 1/2 in)	Hồ Chí Minh City
Trần Huy Hoàng	2003	175 m (574 ft 2 in)	Hồ Chí Minh City
Trần Hồ Hà Đan	2002	164 m (538 ft 1/2 in)	Bạc Liêu
Nguyễn An Nhi	1995	180 m (590 ft 6 1/2 in)	Vĩnh Long
Nguyễn Trang Nhung	1994	176 m (577 ft 5 in)	Vĩnh Long
Thanh Thị Kha Nữ	2000	165 m (541 ft 4 in)	Hậu Giang
Lê Kỳ Hân	1992	170 m (557 ft 9 in)	Hà Nội
Nguyễn Tường San	2005	180 m (590 ft 6 1/2 in)	Khánh Hòa
Shinsa Phạm	2000	174 m (570 ft 10 1/2 in)	Đồng Nai
Nguyễn Hà Dịu Thảo	2000	183 m (600 ft 4 1/2 in)	Hải Dương
Mỹm Trần	1997	170 m (557 ft 9 in)	Hồ Chí Minh City
Trương Kim Kim	1992	175 m (574 ft 2 in)	Hồ Chí Minh City
Lý Huỳnh My	1994	168 m (551 ft 2 in)	An Giang
