= Midori Monét =

American beauty pageant titleholder (born 2000)

- Born: Midori Monét; August 6, 1998 (age 28); Tacoma, Washington, U.S.
- Height: 6 ft 1 in (185 cm)
- Beauty pageant titleholder
- Title: Miss Capitol Hill USA 2024; Miss International Queen USA 2025; Miss International Queen 2025
- Hair color: Brown
- Eye color: Brown
- Major competitions: Miss Washington USA 2024; (Top 6); Miss International Queen USA 2025; (Winner); Miss International Queen 2025; (Winner)

Tiana "Midori" Monét (born August 6, 1998) is an American transgender model, fashion designer, writer and beauty pageant titleholder who was crowned Miss International Queen USA 2025. She represented the United States at Miss International Queen 2025 held in Thailand and became the third American to win the Miss International Queen pageant. She was also crowned Miss Capitol Hill USA 2024 and then entered the Top 6 Miss Washington USA 2024.

== Early life ==
Midori Monet was born in 1998 in Tacoma, Washington, and currently lives and works in Seattle.

== Pageantry ==
Midori's first pageant was Miss Washington USA, and she was a proud participant in the Miss Washington system. She also represented Miss Capitol Hill USA, the gay Capitol Hill district in Seattle, to represent her entire community. One of her inspirations was Kenya Moore, a Real Housewife from Atlanta who won Miss USA 1993. Seeing a Black person win a beauty pageant was very inspiring for Midori. Additionally, Kataluna Enriquez, who competed and won Miss Nevada, was the first transgender woman to win the pageant. Midori was the only Black transgender woman to compete in the Miss Washington pageant and made it to the Top 6 finalists. She was crowned Miss International Queen USA 2025 and represented the United States at Miss International Queen 2025 in Thailand and she was crowned, she is also the 3rd American to be crowned at the contest.

== Personal life ==
Modri is engaged to a man named Mufasa and plans to get married in the future. Midori is also a mother of Kiki House; her house is called Kiki House of Moschino, where she supports the voices and lives of transgender women and queer youth. She guides and teaches these teens and young adults about life and sex education.

Awards and achievements
Preceded by (Peru) Catalina Marsano	Miss International Queen; 2025	Succeeded by (United States) Lo Colby
Preceded by Kataluna Enriquez	Miss International Queen USA; 2025	Succeeded by Lo Colby
