= Catalina Marsano =

Peruvian model and beauty titleholder (born 1995)

- Born: March 24, 1996 (age 30); Lima, Peru
- Education: Antenor Orrego Private University
- Title: Miss International Queen Peru 2024; Miss International Queen 2024

Catalina Marsano (born March 24, 1996) is a Peruvian beauty pageant titleholder who was appointed Miss International Queen Peru 2024 and later won the international title of Miss International Queen 2024. She is the first contestant from Peru to be crowned Miss International Queen.

== Pegeantry ==
Marsano was appointed Miss International Queen Peru 2024 and represented Peru at Miss International Queen 2024 held in Thailand. On August 24, 2024, she was officially crowned Miss International Queen 2024 after surpassing 23 other contestants. Marsano is also the first contestant from Peru to win this contest.

Awards and achievements
Preceded by (Netherlands) Solange Dekker	Miss International Queen; 2024	Succeeded by (United States) Midori Monét
Preceded by Luna Reátegui	Miss International Queen Peru; 2024	Succeeded by Lesly Quispe
