= Nguyễn Hà Dịu Thảo =

Miss International Queen Vietnam 2023

- Born: 17 May 2000 (age 26); Hải Dương, Vietnam
- Height: 1.83 m (6 ft 0 in)
- Beauty pageant titleholder
- Title: Miss International Queen Vietnam 2023
- Hair color: Black
- Eye color: Brown
- Major competitions: Miss Beauty Queen Vietnam 2022 (Winner); Miss International Queen Vietnam 2023 (Winner); Miss International Queen 2023 (Top 11); Miss Universe 2027 (TBD); Miss Grand All Stars 2nd Edition (TBD)

Nguyễn Hà Dịu Thảo (born May 17, 2000) is a Vietnamese transgender model and beauty queen. She was crowned Miss International Queen Vietnam 2023 and represented Vietnam in the subsequent Miss International Queen 2023.

== Early life ==
Thảo supported herself by working various jobs such as being a server, a salesclerk, and a construction worker.

Thảo has stated that she has been aware of her gender identity ever since she was 12. She hid this fact from family and friends for fear of discrimination. In 2018, she began her transition.

== Career ==
=== Miss International Queen Vietnam 2023 ===
On April 8, 2023, she was officially crowned Miss International Queen Vietnam 2023 and represented Vietnam to participate in Miss International Queen 2023 in June in Thailand. On the final night, she showed off her catwalk skills, charisma, and performance to reach the Top 6 and eventually win the crown.

=== Miss International Queen 2023 ===
The final night of Miss International Queen 2023 took place on the evening of June 24, 2023 in Pattaya, Thailand, she won 3 additional awards including Best National Costume, Wonder Woman Award and Miss Popular Vote. She finished in the Top 11.

Awards and achievements
Preceded by Phùng Trương Trân Đài	Hoa hậu Chuyển giới Việt Nam; 2023	Succeeded by Hà Tâm Như
Preceded by Phùng Trương Trân Đài	Miss International Queen Vietnam; 2023	Succeeded by Nguyễn Tường San
Preceded by (Japan) Yushin Sakamato	Best National Costume; Miss International Queen; 2023	Succeeded by (Vietnam) Nguyễn Tường San
Preceded by (India) Namitha Marimuthu	Miss Popular Vote; Miss International Queen; 2023	Succeeded by (United States) Kataluna Enriquez
