= Nguyễn Tường San =

Miss International Queen Vietnam 2024

- Born: Nguyễn Hoàng Bảo Phúc; January 2, 2005 (age 21); Khánh Hòa, Vietnam
- Beauty pageant titleholder
- Title: Miss International Queen Vietnam 2024
- Hair color: Black
- Eye color: Brown
- Major competitions: Miss International Queen Vietnam 2023; (1st Runner-Up); Miss International Queen Vietnam 2024 (Special Episode); (Winner); Miss International Queen 2024; (2nd Runner-Up)

Nguyễn Tường San (born 2 January 2005) is a Vietnamese transgender beauty pageant titleholder, who won Miss International Queen Vietnam 2024, and represented Vietnam at Miss International Queen 2024 and was second runner-up.

== Pageantry ==
=== Miss International Queen Vietnam 2023 ===
On April 8, 2023, San was first runner-up at Miss International Queen Vietnam 2023 and will represent Vietnam at Miss International Queen 2024 in June in Thailand.

=== Miss International Queen 2024 ===
She will represent Vietnam at Miss International Queen 2024 taking place in August in Thailand.

Before the final, she was second runner-up in the Best Talent. In the semi-finals, she also won two special awards, Miss Perfect Skin and Preliminary Best Performance.

Awards and achievements
Preceded by (United States) Melony Munro	2nd Runner-up Miss International Queen; 2024	Succeeded by (Ecuador) Reyna Morocho
Preceded by Nguyễn Hà Dịu Thảo	Miss International Queen Vietnam; 2024	Succeeded by Hà Tâm Như
Preceded by Lương Mỹ Kỳ	1st Runner-up Miss International Queen Vietnam; 2023	Succeeded by Nguyễn Cao Minh Anh
