= Hà Tâm Như =

Miss International Queen Vietnam 2025

- Born: 17 March 1998 (age 28); Vĩnh Long, Vietnam
- Height: 1.80 m (5 ft 11 in)
- Beauty pageant titleholder
- Title: Miss International Queen Vietnam 2025
- Hair color: Black
- Eye color: Brown
- Major competitions: Miss International Queen Vietnam 2025 (Winner); Miss International Queen 2025 (2nd Runner-Up)

Hà Tâm Như (born March 17, 1998) is a transgender model and beauty queen Vietnam. She was crowned Miss International Queen Vietnam 2025 and was the Second Runner-Up at Miss International Queen 2025, held in Thailand in September 2025.

Awards and achievements
Preceded by Nguyễn Hà Dịu Thảo	Hoa hậu Chuyển giới Việt Nam; 2025	Succeeded by Incumbent
Preceded by Nguyễn Tường San	Miss International Queen Vietnam; 2025	Succeeded by Nguyễn Cao Minh Anh
Preceded by (Vietnam) Nguyễn Tường San	2nd Runner-up Miss International Queen; 2025	Succeeded by (Japan) Saki Iwai
