= Miss International Queen Vietnam 2018 =

- Date: January 11, 2019
- Entertainment: Bảo Anh • Ali Hoàng Dương • Minh Ngọc • Lưu Hiền Trinh
- Venue: Tân Bình Gymnasium, Ho Chi Minh City, Vietnam
- Broadcaster: Anh Quân • Mỹ Linh
- Entrants: 16
- Placements: 10
- Winner: Đỗ Nhật Hà; Ho Chi Minh City

Miss International Queen Vietnam 2018 is the first edition of Miss International Queen Vietnam pageant, was held on January 11, 2019, at Tân Bình Gymnasium, Ho Chi Minh City, Vietnam.

President of Miss International Queen Ms.Alisa Phanthusak crowned Đỗ Nhật Hà of Ho Chi Minh City at the end of the event.

Nguyễn Hương Giang, Đoàn Di Băng, Dược Sĩ Tiến were judges at the competition. Miss Supranational Vietnam 2016 Khả Trang and The Face Vietnam season 1 champion Phi Phuong Anh were contestants' mentors on the competition.

== Final results ==
Placement	Candidate	International beauty pageant
Miss International Queen Vietnam 2018	Đỗ Nhật Hà	Top 06 – Miss International Queen 2019
1st runner-up	Nguyễn Phương Vy	Unplaced – Miss Vietnam World France 2019
2nd runner-up	Bùi Đình Hoài Sa	Top 12 – Miss International Queen 2020
Top 5	Lê Tiểu Luân (§); Trần Nguyễn Ngọc Vi (¥)
Top 10	Chau Kim Sang †; Nguyễn Tôn Hảo; Linh Mỹ Nhi; Đào Anh
Top 10	Nguyễn Sử Yến Mi	1st Runner-Up – Miss Universe Trans 2023
The remaining candidates	Nguyễn Hoàng My; Kayce Chung; Nguyễn An Nhi; Lý Huỳnh My; Nguyễn Nhã Kỳ; Hồ Điệp

Note

§: The winner of the Most Popular Vote award goes straight to the Top 10
¥: Contestants advance to the Finals by winning the Best Talent award
