= Miss International Queen 2024 =

Transgender beauty pageant in Thailand

- Date: 24 August 2024
- Presenters: Luke Ishikawa Plowden, Saraichatt Jirapatt
- Theme: The Force of Transformation
- Venue: Tiffany's Show Pattaya, Pattaya, Chonburi, Thailand
- Broadcaster: Channel 3
- Entrants: 23
- Placements: 12
- Debuts: Bolivia; El Salvador
- Withdrawals: Netherlands; Nicaragua; Singapore; Spain
- Returns: India; Myanmar; Taiwan
- Winner: Catalina Marsano; Peru
- Congeniality: Saruda Panyakham; Thailand
- Photogenic: Nguyễn Tường San; Vietnam

Miss International Queen 2024 was the 18th Miss International Queen pageant, held at the Tiffany's Show Pattaya in Pattaya, Chonburi, Thailand, on 24 August 2024.

Solange Dekker of the Netherlands crowned Catalina Marsano of Peru as her successor at the end of the event. This is the first time that Peru claimed the title.

== Results ==
=== Placements ===
Placement	Contestant
Miss International Queen 2024	Peru – Catalina Marsano
1st Runner-Up	Thailand – Saruda Panyakham
2nd Runner-Up	Vietnam – Nguyễn Tường San ☆
Top 6	Colombia – Juliana Rivera Gutiérrez; Philippines – Sophia Nicole Arkanghel; United States – Kataluna Enriquez ∆
Top 12	Brazil – Jessy Lira; Japan – Rin Tsuchiya; Laos – Napatsarakran Samatmanivong; Mexico – Romina Amador Muñiz; Puerto Rico – Daniela Victoria; Venezuela – Shana Zabala

☆ – Voted into the Top 12 via Best Performance by Preliminary.

∆ – Qualified into the Top 12 via Best Social Influencer Award

== Special awards ==
Award	Contestant
Best in Talent	United States – Kataluna Enriquez
Best Social Influencer	United States – Kataluna Enriquez
Miss Golden Shape	United States – Kataluna Enriquez
Miss Glamorous Face	Philippines – Sophia Nicole Arkanghel

=== Best in Talent ===
Award	Contestant
Winner	United States – Kataluna Enriquez
1st Runner-Up	Indonesia – Olivia Summer
2nd Runner-Up	Vietnam – Nguyễn Tường San

== Contestants ==
23 contestants competed for the title.

Country/Territory	Contestant	Age (Note: Ages at the time of the pageant)	Hometown
Bolivia	Catalina Ortega	29	Santa Cruz
Brazil	Jessy Lira	27	São Paulo
Cambodia	Maiya	26	Kampong Thom
Canada	Adriana Fernandez	32	Calgary
China	Asuka Rina	24	Hunan
Colombia	Juliana Rivera Gutiérrez	28	Antioquia
Ecuador	Kenia Bonilla	28	Guayaquil
El Salvador	Tatiana Molina	29	San Salvador
India	Arshi Ghosh	31	Mumbai
Indonesia	Olivia Summer	20	Jakarta
Japan	Rin Tsuchiya	22	Tokyo
Laos	Napatsarakran Samatmanivong	19	Vientiane
Malaysia	Eva Foster	31	Kuala Lumpur
Mexico	Romina Amador Muñiz	28	Tecomán
Myanmar	Monica	27	Mandalay
Peru	Catalina Marsano	28	Lima
Philippines	Sophia Nicole Arkanghel	25	Victoria
Puerto Rico	Daniela Arroyo	21	San Juan
Taiwan	Ella Ala Lim	35	Taipei
Thailand	Saruda Panyakham	29	Tak
United States	Kataluna Enriquez	30	Las Vegas
Venezuela	Shana Zabala	23	Caracas
Vietnam	Nguyễn Tường San	19	Khánh Hòa

== Controversy ==
Participant Eva Foster voiced concerns about the pageant, accusing it of favoritism and unprofessionalism. She was disappointed about not reaching the top 12 despite her strong showing, especially in the evening gown segment. Foster also mentioned that other contestants, including those from Indonesia and India, shared her concerns that the competition was influenced by factors beyond merit. After the controversy sparked by her remarks Foster took to social media to offer a sincere apology, particularly to the people of Thailand. In her apology, Foster expressed profound regret for any misunderstandings or offense her actions may have caused.
