= Solange Dekker =

Dutch beauty pageant titleholder

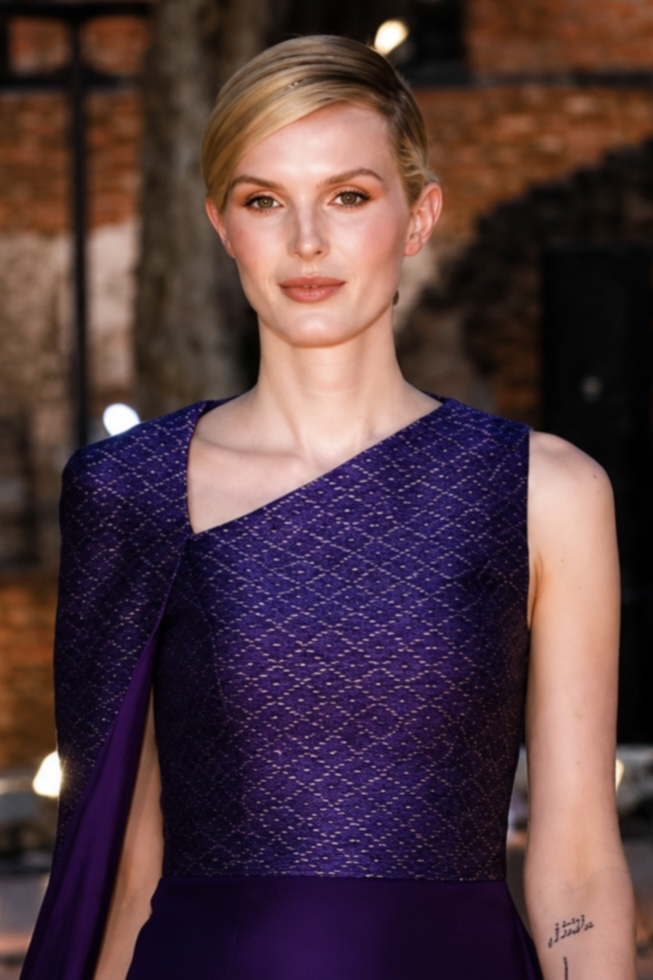
- Dekker in 2023
- Born: 15 March 1996 (age 30); Amsterdam, Netherlands
- Height: 185 cm (6 ft 1 in)
- Beauty pageant titleholder
- Title: Miss International Queen Netherlands 2023; Miss International Queen 2023; Miss Cosmo Netherlands 2025
- Major competitions: Miss International Queen 2023; (Winner); Miss Cosmo 2025; (Unplaced)

Solange Dekker is a Dutch beauty pageant titleholder who won Miss International Queen 2023, and was the first contestant from the Netherlands to win the title.

== Pageantry ==
Dekker's first pageant was Miss Trans Star International 2019 held in Barcelona, Spain where she placed to the Top 10. She was also a finalist at Miss Universe Netherlands, becoming the first Dutch transgender woman to compete in the national competition.

Dekker won Miss International Queen 2023, held on Saturday June 24, 2023 at Tiffany's Show in Pattaya Chonburi, Thailand. She is the first contestant from the Netherlands to win the title. Dekker was among 22 contestants participating in the pageant, along with Singapore's Qatrisha Kamsir and United States's Melony Munro finishing second and third, respectively.

In 2025, Dekker was selected as Miss Cosmo Netherlands, she represent her country at the Miss Cosmo 2025, held in Vietnam. Dekker did not place in the final standings.

Awards and achievements
Preceded by (Philippines) Fuschia Anne Ravena	Miss International Queen; 2022	Succeeded by (Peru) Catalina Marsano
Preceded by Serena Darder	Miss Cosmo Netherlands; 2025	Succeeded by Incumbent
