= Miss Gay Philippines =

LGBTQ beauty pageant in the Philippines

- Type: Beauty pageant for LGBTQ people
- Founder: Chito Alcid
- Owners: Madam Markie Binsol; Futurus Betera Creative Management Group
- Language: Filipino; English

Miss Gay Philippines (MGP) is a queer beauty pageant in the Philippines. Considered the longest-running national gay beauty pageant in the Philippines, Miss Gay Philippines was founded in 1979 by entertainment journalist and talk show host Chito Alcid. Miss Gay Philippines is currently owned by the Betera Group.

== History ==
Miss Gay Philippines was founded in 1979 by Chito Alcid, a Filipino entertainment reporter and talk show host. Eddie Mercado, famous Filipino actor and sought-after beauty pageant host, was the original host of this competition. The pageant is intended to promote the integration of Filipino LGBT people into mainstream life in the Philippines. In an interview with the Daily Guardian, Alcid said, "[Miss Gay Philippines] is a platform for them to further develop their personality, how to be more productive gays, to be professional in dealing with people ... [and] remind them the importance of moral values and their relationship to society."

Following Alcid's death in 2013, the Miss Gay Philippines franchise was bought out by the Betera Group. The recipient of the Miss Gay Philippines — Universe title represented the Philippines at the Miss International Queen pageant held annually in Thailand until 2015, when media conglomerate Viva Entertainment and the city of Manila launched Miss Gay Manila.

== Qualifications ==
In order to qualify as a contestant for Miss Gay Philippines, contestants must fulfill these qualifications:

- Filipino identifying as gay, trans, or bisexual
- 17 to 34 years old
- At least 5'4" in height
- Proportionate physique
- At least a high school diploma
- Have good communication skills
- Have good moral character

Gay, trans, and bisexual identities are blurred in Filipino culture in a third gender identity, bakla, in contrast to Western society's strict separation of gender and sexuality.

Potential contestants do not have to be career pageanteras in order to participate. Miss Gay Philippines contestants can also have national, city, or local neighborhood titles, but can participate without having received other pageant titles.

The screening process takes place in four steps leading up to coronation night. First, potential contestants must confirm their availability for orientation, photoshoots, and the pageant itself. Second, potential contestants go through a series of interviews to confirm their qualifications. Third, potential contestants must pay the applicable registration fee in order to become an official candidate. Fourth, all official candidates must attend orientation and pictorials.

== Pageant events ==
The Miss Gay Philippines pageant consists of traditional costumes, an opening number, swimsuits and evening gowns. After the evening gowns presentation, there is an elimination round to narrow down the contestants.

The last portion of the competition is a question-and-answer session with the remaining contestants. These question-and-answer segments are an essential part of the pageant. A smart, articulate response given by a contestant is a major factor in their pageant success. Afterwards, major titles and minor awards are awarded.

Pageants are judged by prominent figures in Filipino popular culture, including former beauty pageant queens. Previous judges include model and former beauty queen Evangeline Pascual, actress Susan Roces, Miss International pageant winner Melanie Marquez and actor Eddie Garcia.

== Titles and awards ==
Since its inception, there have been five main titles awarded. The 2017 pageant added an additional two main titles. All titles and awards come with a cash reward. The main titles awarded at Miss Gay Philippines are:

- Miss Gay Philippines Universe
- Miss Gay Philippines World
- Miss Gay Philippines Earth
- Miss Gay Philippines International
- Miss Gay Philippines Asia Pacific
- Miss Gay Philippines Grand International
- Miss Gay Philippines Globe

The minor awards are:

- Face of Betera
- People's Choice Award
- Best in Swimsuit
- Best in Evening Gown
- Placenta Awardee (awarded to 3 contestants)

== Miss Gay Philippines titleholders ==
Edition	Miss Gay Philippines — Universe
2022	Pep Lastimosa
2021	-
2020	-
2019	-
2018	-
2017	Tamira Ivonne Willis
2016	Justine Ashley Rojas
2015	Catrina Camille Marcos and Vanessa Cabrera
2014	Kweeeen Bautista
2013	Kim Marie Villagallano
2012	Erriz Erikha Lanceta
2011	Trixie Maristela
2010	Nixie Salonga
2009	Boom Reyes
2008	Gheng Azarcon
2007	Lena Santos
2006	Erica Illustre
2005	Rain Marie Madrigal
2004	Jamby Garcia
2003	Amor Montecarlo
2002	Lt Montecarlo
2001	Keena Marie McBride
2000	Barbie Anderson
1999	Lovely Linda
1998	Mylene Cabrera
1997	Lance Perta
1996	Evangiline Ramirez
1995	Bong Magat
1994	Tony Rose Gaida
1993	Cindy Bumabat
1992	Ana Lizel Smiling
1991	
1990	
1989	
1988	
1987	
1986	
1985	Barbie Anne Wolfe
1984	Patricia Hilario
1983	Bo Magat
1982	Joy Perez Mendez
1981	Cecilia Antonio
1980	Ma. Christina Canlas
1979	Mario Canlas

== Significance ==
Through the question-and-answer portions of the pageant, Miss Gay Philippines participants have the opportunity to advocate for LGBT equity in the Philippines on a national scale. Gay pageantry and cross-dressing is used as a source of healing for gay Filipino men. Filipino scholar and writer J. Neil Garcia has referenced Miss Gay Philippines in his works pertaining to Western notions of gender performativity and queer identities in the Philippines.

Miss Gay Philippines pageants has influenced the spread of gay beauty pageants in various barangays, local neighborhoods, throughout the Philippines. These gay beauty pageants often serve as fundraisers for local bakla communities. Many Miss Gay Philippines contestants have participated in these smaller gay beauty pageants.

Miss Gay Philippines pageants have also extended over to nations where Filipinos have migrated. LGBT Filipino immigrants have held similar Miss Gay Philippines pageants in Oslo and Toronto.

== Notable participants ==
2011 Miss Gay Philippines — Universe titleholder Trixie Maristela was crowned Miss International Queen, the largest trans beauty pageant in the world, in 2015. Maristela is the second entrant from the Philippines to win the title. Maristela has since appeared on Filipino television shows such as GMA's Karelasyon and Magkapailanman.

Ian Valdez, an actor who has appeared in Tagalog films such as Woman of Breakwater, was a Miss Gay Philippines contestant.

== Controversies ==
Miss Gay Philippines, along with other Filipino gay beauty pageants, are a large part of LGBT culture in the Philippines. However, Filipino gay beauty pageants, according to Justin Francis Bionat of the Filipino LGBT magazine Outrage Magazine, "do not necessarily promote being LGBT, as much as exploit those who join them."

Erriz Lanceta, the recipient of the 2012 Miss Gay Philippines — Universe title, came under fire for transphobic comments made toward Miss Universe Canada contestant Jenna Talackova. Talackova is the first trans woman to compete in the pageant after Miss Universe rules were revised to allow trans women to participate. In an interview with Bombo Radyo Iloilo, Lanceta made remarks toward Talackova and other trans women that questioned their ability to answer questions about being a "real woman."

Kristine Coronel and Vodca Dee, original crown holders of Miss Gay Philippines International and Asia Pacific 2015 respectively, were dethroned from their titles and as members of the Betera Group for repeated violation of section (e) of the memorandum of agreement for Miss Gay Philippines winners that prohibits talent from participating in lesser pageants. Toni Lopez and Tyra Syntangco replaced Kristine Coronel and Vodca Dee, respectively.

== See also ==
- Miss Gay America
- Miss International Queen
- Mr. Gay World Philippines Organization
- LGBT culture in the Philippines
- Trixie Maristela
- Jenna Talackova
- Miss Tiffany's Universe
