= Miss International Queen Nicaragua =

National beauty pageant in Nicaragua

- Abbreviation: MIQN
- Formation: 1 January 2012; 14 years ago
- Founder: Miss Gay Nicaragua Org
- Type: Beauty pageant
- Headquarters: Managua
- Location: Nicaragua
- Members: Miss International Queen (2012–present); Miss Trans Star International (2022–present) (2012)
- Official language: Spanish
- Miss International Queen Nicaragua 2026: Amaya Rivera
- President: Tiffany Coleman
- Key people: Tiffany's Show Pattaya
- Parent organization: Miss Tiffany's Universe
- Website: https://instagram.com/missgaynicaraguaorganizacion

Miss International Queen Nicaragua is national beauty pageant for transgender woman in Nicaragua since 2012 Nicaragua has competed in the international pageant Miss International Queen in Thailand. Nonetheless, Nicaragua has only competed in 6 editions of the pageant.

The reining Miss International Queen Nicaragua 2026 is Amaya Rivera from Granada. She became the first titleholder under Tiffany's Colleman directionship.

== International representations ==
=== Miss International Queen ===
Declared as the winner
Ended as the runner-up
Ended as semi-finalist
Award Winner

| Year | Representative | State | Competition performance | | |
| Year | Representative | State | Placements | Title/Award | Fast Track |
|---|---|---|---|---|---|
| 2026 | Amaya Rivera | Granada | Unplaced | | |
| 2025 | Tiffany Colleman | Managua | Top 12 | Miss Trans Star International 2022; First Nicaraguan to compete 2 times at Miss International Queen | |
No competition held in 2024
| 2023 | Brenda López | Managua | Unplaced | | |
No competition held 2020-2022
| 2019 | Tiffany Colleman | Managua | Unplaced | Best National Costume | |
| 2018 | Barbie D'Ebano | Managua | Unplaced | | |
No competition held 2015—2017
| 2014 | America Ithzelle | Managua | Unplaced | | |
No competition held in 2013
| 2012 | Berdien Blandino | Managua | Unplaced | | |

=== Miss Trans Star International ===
Declared as the winner
Ended as the runner-up
Ended as semi-finalist
Award Winner

| Year | Representative | State6 | Competition performance | | |
| Year | Representative | State6 | Placements | Title/Award | Fast Track |
|---|---|---|---|---|---|
| 2026 | Rayza Suazo | Managua | TBA | | |
| 2024 | Brithany Law | Managua | Unplaced | | |
| 2023 | Marcela Rojas | Masaya | Top 6 | | |
| 2022 | Tiffany Colleman | Managua | Miss Trans Star International 2022 | | Top 5 Best national costume |
