= Miss Transqueen India =

Indian beauty pageant for transgender people

- Formation: 2017
- Type: Beauty pageant
- Headquarters: New Delhi
- Location: India
- Official language: English; Hindi
- Founder: Reena Rai
- Key people: Manoj Rai (Managing Partner)
- Website: www.transqueenindia.com

Miss Transqueen India is an Indian beauty pageant exclusively for transgender individuals. Founded and chaired by cisgender woman Reena Rai, the pageant's winner represents India at Miss International Queen. Transgender actress Navya Singh serves as the pageant's Brand Ambassador.

== History ==
The founder began trying to bring her project into the limelight in November 2016 but struggled due to lack of sponsorship. The first ever Miss Transqueen India was held at Gurugram, New Delhi where 16 contestants, selected from among 1500 transgender people across 10 states, competed for the crown.

== Format ==
After auditions, contestants compete in several rounds including evening gown, swimsuit, traditional wear, and question-answer.

== Titleholders ==
| Year | Delegate | State/Region |
|---|---|---|
| 2024 | Arshi Ghosh | Mumbai |
| 2022 | Namitha Marimuthu | Chennai |
| 2020 | Shaine Soni | Delhi |
| 2019 | Nithu R. S. | Bangalore |
| 2018 | Veena Sendre | Chhattisgarh |
| 2017 | Nitasha Biswas | West Bengal |

== Representatives to International Pageants ==
The following trans queens have represented India in the major international beauty pageants for transgender women, Miss International Queen in Thailand.

=== Miss International Queen ===
Color key

- : Declared as winner
- : Ended as runner-up or top 5/6 qualification
- : Ended as one of the finalists/semi-finalists
- : Unplaced but given special award(s)

| Year | Delegate | Hometown | Competition performance | |
| Year | Delegate | Hometown | Placements | Special award(s) |
|---|---|---|---|---|
| 2004 | Arisha Rani | New Delhi | 1st Runners-up | 1 Special Award: Best in Evening Gown |
| 2011 | Malaika Desingh | New Delhi | Unplaced | |
| 2013 | Angela | New Delhi | Unplaced | |
| 2017 | Bishesh Huirem | New Delhi | Unplaced | |
| 2018 | Nitasha Biswas | West Bengal | Unplaced | 1 Special Award: Top 15 – Miss Talent |
| 2019 | Veena Sendre | Chhattisgarh | Top 12 | 1 Special Award: Top 12 – Miss Talent |
| 2020 | Nithu R. S. | Bangalore | Unplaced | 1 Special Award: Top 13 – Miss Talent |
| 2022 | Namitha Marimuthu | Chennai | Top 11 | 1 Special Award: Miss Popular Vote |
| 2024 | Arshi Ghosh | Mumbai | Unplaced | |

The Miss Transqueen India organization did not send a delegate to Miss International Queen in the years 2005–2010, 2012, 2014–2016 and 2023.
