= Jiratchaya Sirimongkolnawin =

Thai model, fashion designer and beauty titleholder (born 1991)

- Born: May 2, 1991 (age 35); Bangkok, Thailand
- Education: Srinakharinwirot University
- Title: Miss Tiffany's Universe 2016; Miss International Queen 2016

Jiratchaya Sirimongkolnawin (born May 2, 1991) is a Thai model, fashion designer and beauty pageant titleholder who was crowned Miss Tiffany's Universe 2016 and later won the international title of Miss International Queen 2016.

== Career ==
A fashion designer by training with a background in dental health studies at Srinakharinwirot University, she has worked as a spokesperson for beauty centers and maintains an active career in modeling and talent management, including as director of models and influencers at Feline Agency. Her victories highlighted Thailand's prominence in transgender pageantry, drawing global media attention to the Miss International Queen, billed as the world's largest for transgender contestants.

Awards and achievements
Preceded by (Philippines) Trixie Maristela	Miss International Queen; 2016	Succeeded by (Vietnam) Nguyễn Hương Giang
Preceded by Sopida Siriwattananukoon	Miss Tiffany's Universe; 2016	Succeeded by Rinrada Thurapan
