= Ai Haruna =

Japanese media icon

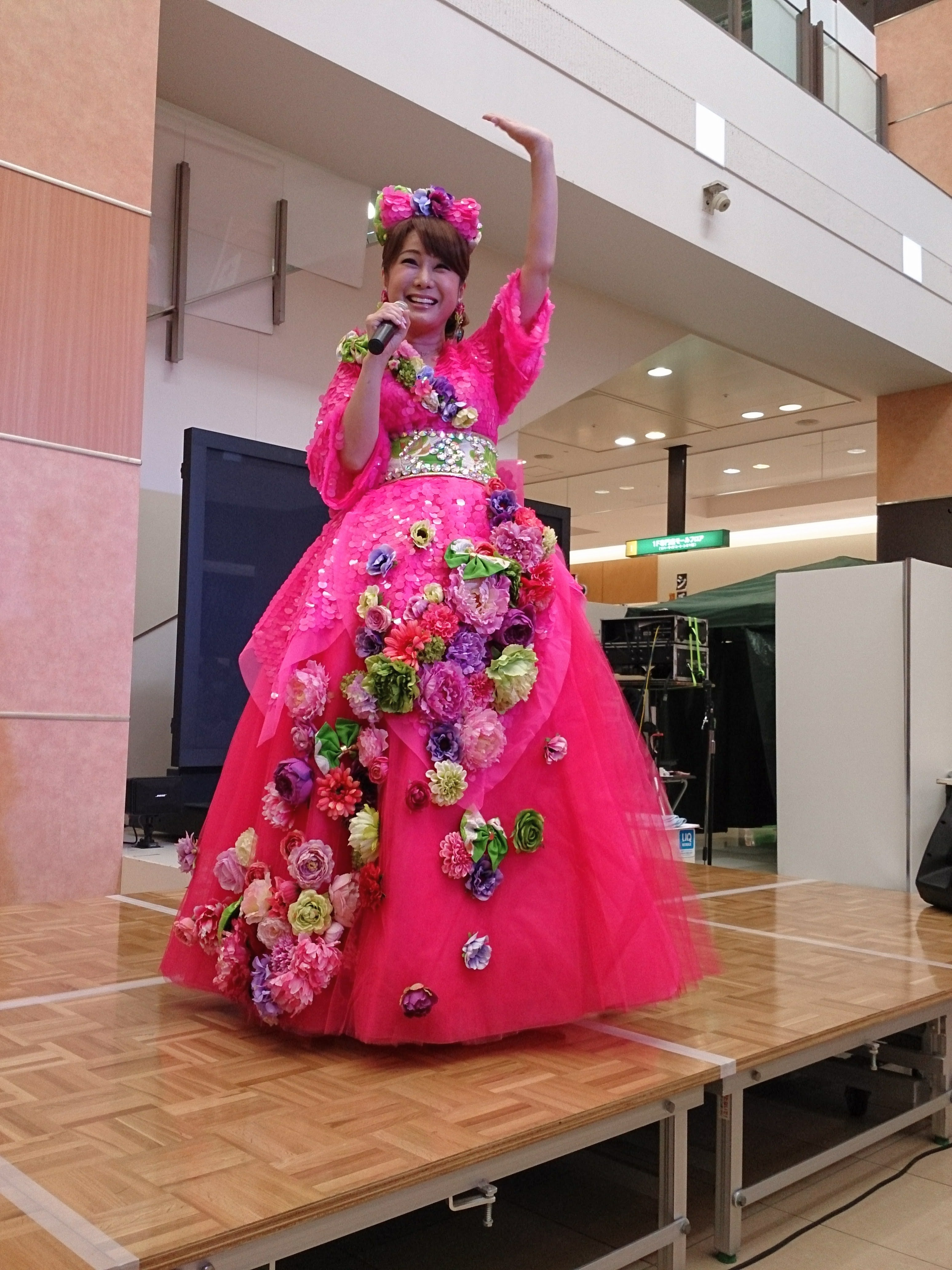
- Haruna in 2018.
- Born: Kenji Ōnishi; 21 July 1972 (age 54); Tokyo, Japan
- Height: 5 ft 5 in (1.65 m)
- Title: Miss International Queen 2009

Ai Haruna (はるな 愛, Haruna Ai; born 21 July 1972) is a Japanese transgender TV personality and singer.

In October 2009, Haruna won the "Miss International Queen 2009" transgender beauty pageant held in Pattaya, Thailand, becoming the first Japanese contestant to win the title.

On 24 August 2021, she appeared at the beginning of the opening ceremony of the Tokyo Paralympics held at the National Stadium, where she performed a dance performance.

A biopic of Haruna, titled This Is I, was released on Netflix on 10 February 2026.

== Discography ==
=== Singles ===
- "I・U・Yo・Ne" (2008)
- "Natsu Dekoboko Love" (夏 凸凹ラブ) (2009)
- "Crazy Love" (2010)
- "Motto Ai o" (もっと愛を) (2012)
- "Eenende" (えぇねんで)(2016)

=== Collaborations ===
- "Momi Momi Fantastic feat. Haruna Ai" - Asia Engineer (2009)

== TV commercials ==
- Fanta Momi Momi Frozen (2009)
- Suzuki " Carry "(Website: August 2013 -) (TV: September 2013 -) - Bunta Sugawara, Hokuto and co-star.
- Suzuki " EVERY " (February 2015 -) - Takashi Ukaji, Hiroshi Madoka and co-star.

Awards and achievements
Preceded by (Thailand) Tanyarat Jirapatpakon	Miss International Queen; 2009	Succeeded by (South Korea) Mini Han
