= Erica Andrews =

Beauty pageant winner and drag performer

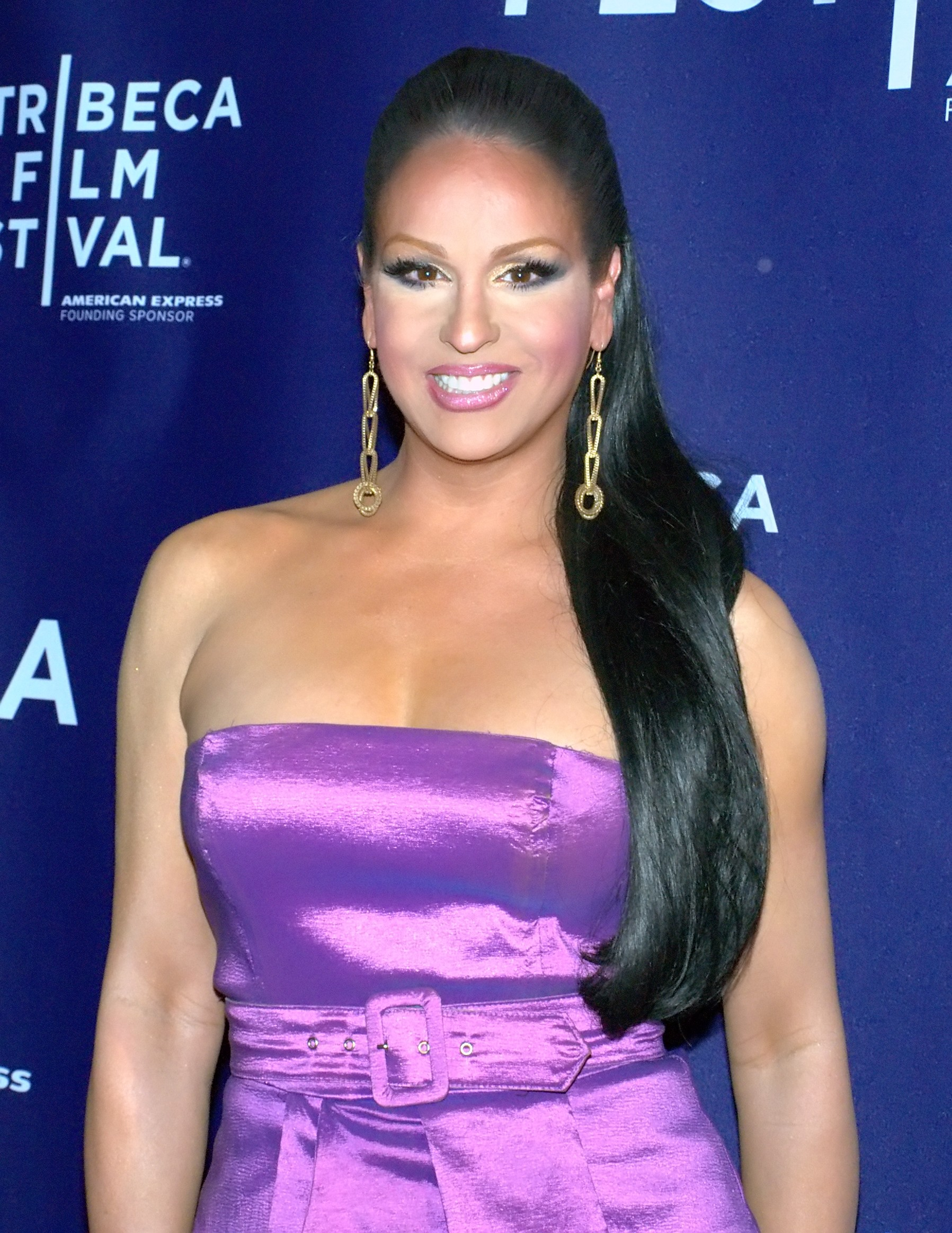
- Andrews at the Tribeca Film Festival, 2010
- Born: September 30, 1969; Allende, Nuevo León, Mexico
- Died: March 11, 2013 (aged 43); Chicago, Illinois, U.S.
- Occupations: actress, drag performer, entrepreneur
- Years active: 1988–2013
- Known for: Drag performance, beauty pageant winner, stage and film performance

Erica Andrews (September 30, 1969 – March 11, 2013) was a Mexican drag performer, actress, entrepreneur, activist and beauty queen who was crowned Miss International Queen 2006.

== Early life and career ==
Erica Andrews was born on September 30, 1969, in Allende, Nuevo León, Mexico.

She grew up on a small ranch called Los Aguirres in the rural outskirts of Allende, where there was little electricity. She changed her name to Erica, a name she derived from a phonetic pronunciation of Eddie. She attached a colloquial ca to the end of Eddie so that it sounded like Eddieca and formed the name Erica. Consequently, she became Erica Salazar. Beginning around 1989–1990, she took on the stage name Erica Hutton. She named herself after Lauren Hutton, whom she admired. After she met Tandi Andrews, who became her drag mother and mentor, she changed her stage name to Erica Hutton Andrews and subsequently to Erica Andrews.

Andrews was born into a family with two older brothers and a younger sister. During her childhood, her father was sentenced to ten years in prison for a drug offense. Andrews spent her childhood in Allende through the age of 8, when her mother and siblings crossed the border and settled in Laredo, Texas. Though Andrews maintained a relationship with her mother and siblings, she became estranged from her father and never saw him again. Upon leaving home, Andrews attended college for two years, earning an associate degree. She attended cosmetology school and became a licensed cosmetologist. She began to work as a make-up artist and consultant at department store makeup counters for MAC Cosmetics and also for Glamour Shots.

In an interview with Ambiente Magazine in 2005, Andrews recalled a difficult childhood. She described being referred to as a little girl instead of a little boy by a guest speaker at her elementary school and being laughed at by the students. She also remembered in high school returning home from a volleyball game and being taunted by two guys who threw her down, kicked dirt on her, and punched her a couple of times. On the Tyra Banks Show as well as in an online radio interview with Richard Curtin, Andrews discussed a time when she was about 17 when she ran away from home and struggled because of the challenges she faced as a trans woman. She began her estrogen hormone replacement therapy when she was 18. She had undergone silicone and electrolysis treatment. Andrews said she had never had any plastic surgery on her face or body.

== Career ==
At 18, she was introduced to drag and female impersonation through her then-boyfriend, who was himself a female impersonator and drag pageant contestant. In 1988, Andrews moved with her boyfriend to San Antonio, where she made a name for herself in the city's drag circuit. Her first performance was at a club named Las Gueras, performing the song Break Away. She began performing on amateur nights at the (now-defunct) Paper Moon nightclub, later renamed The Saint, on Main Avenue in San Antonio. Andrews won Paper Moon's “Talent of the Week” and “Talent of the Month” contests. This led to her participation in the club's “Newcomer of the Year” contest, in which she placed third. At the encouragement and with the support of Raphael Ruiz de Velasco (owner of Paper Moon/The Saint), Andrews entered the Miss San Antonio USA pageant.

=== Beauty pageants ===
Andrews actively participated in beauty pageants, becoming a celebrated multi-national and international titleholder. According to an article in the Houston Chronicle, she was considered to be "one of the most decorated queens on the pageant circuit". She was also called "the most beautiful drag queen in captivity". The first pageant title that Andrews won was Miss Just Us (1989). She was a promoter for the Miss Texas Continental franchise.

Andrews won numerous pageant titles. Her titles include:

Year	Title	Location	Notes
1997	Miss Gay Texas USofA	Houston, Texas	Event venue was Inergy Club (never known as Rich's Houston) presently not called Crystal Night Club.
1999	Miss Gay USofA	Dallas, Texas	Event venue was Dallas Grand Hotel Ballroom.
2001	Miss Texas Continental	San Antonio, Texas	Event venue was The Saint. (before Paper Moon)
2004	Miss Florida Continental	Miami, Florida	Andrews also won the best gown and talent awards.
2004	Universal ShowQueen	Honolulu, Hawaii	Event held on June 26, 2004, at the Pacific Ballroom of the Ilikai Hotel.
2004	Miss Continental	Chicago, Illinois	Event sponsored by Baton Show Lounge and held at the Park West Theater. Andrews had competed for Miss Continental in 1998 (top 12) and in 2001 (5 Runner up).
2006	Miss International Queen	Pattaya City, Thailand	The world's most prestigious and largest beauty pageant for international transgender women. Event held on October 29, 2006, at Tiffany's Show Theater, Pattaya City, Chonburi, Thailand. Andrews competed under the Mexican flag. She chose to compete for her country of origin/birth. She presented the Miss International Queen organization with her birth certificate and was allowed.
2006	National Entertainer of the Year, FI	Louisville, Kentucky	Event venue was the Connection Complex.

=== Live performances ===
Andrews performed on the United States LGBT drag circuit. Andrews performed at San Antonio nightclubs like The Saint, Heat, The Bonham, and The Pegasus.

Andrews imitated Hollywood greats such as Joan Crawford, Cher, top Latin artist Selena Quintanilla-Pérez, and fictional characters like Jessica Rabbit and Wonder Woman. Her performances included the Mommie Dearest boardroom scene which was accompanied by a Shirley Bassey mix to "I (Who Have Nothing)" as well as a depiction of Mary Katherine Gallagher, a fictional character who is a sardonic caricature of an unpopular teen Catholic school girl invented by Saturday Night Live cast member Molly Shannon and featured in Superstar.

=== Drag Family ===
Erica was the drag mother of Janet Fierce Andrews, Miss Gay USofA 2018. She was also the drag mother of Roxxxy Andrews, Miss Continental Plus 2010, a drag queen who has appeared on the popular reality television series RuPaul's Drag Race and RuPaul's Drag Race All Stars.

== Activism ==
In 2010, Andrews was the first model for the Faces of Life photographic project that originated from Dallas, Texas. The project by Jorge Rivas was created to bring awareness to people who are HIV positive or have AIDS.

== Later life and death ==
In 2012, after making San Antonio her home base for many years, Andrews moved to Indiana, to be with her boyfriend.

Andrews died from complications as a result of a lung infection on March 11, 2013, at UIC hospital in Chicago, Illinois.

== Works ==
=== Television ===
Year	Title	Episode	Role	Notes
2001	The Maury Povich Show	Sexy, Hot Ladies...Or Are They?	Herself	Episode aired on January 30, 2001.
?	The Maury Povich Show	Male Or Female!	Herself	
2006	Trantasia		Herself	Documentary based on The World's Most Beautiful Transsexual Contest.
2007	The Tyra Banks Show	Trantasia	Herself	Season 3, episode 56. Episode aired on Tuesday, November 27, 2007.<

=== Stage productions ===
In 2002, Andrews' first stage performance was in Jotos del Barrio, a play written by Jesus Alonzo that explored the lives of young gay Latinos. The play was presented as a series of poems, monologues, and vignettes. She played a transgender character, Janie la Transie. In an interview with the San Antonio Current, Andrews spoke of her ability to relate to the character. She also played an additional role as the biological mother of a young gay male.

In 2004, Andrews played the lead role of The Succubus, a vampire lesbian, in Charles Busch's off-Broadway satirical play Vampire Lesbians of Sodom, produced by the Actors Theatre of San Antonio group.

In 2009, Andrews performed in Jesus Alonzo's play Miss America: A Mexicanito's Fairy Tale at the Esperanza Peace and Justice Center in San Antonio. The play was about a nine-year-old boy, Chuy, who dreamed of becoming Miss America. Andrews portrayed Chuy's fairy godmother.

Year	Title	Role	Playwright	Location	Notes
2002	Jotos del Barrio	Janie la Transie; Biological mother to young gay male	Jesus Alonzo	Jump-Start Theater, San Antonio, Texas	Andrews played dual roles in the production. Andrews participated in the Jotos del Barrio one-night only encore performance at the Esperanza Peace and Justice Center, San Antonio, Texas, on May 10, 2002. Listed as Erica Salazar on production credits.
2009	Miss America: A Mexicanito's Fairy Tale	Fairy godmother	Jesus Alonzo	Esperanza Peace and Justice Center, San Antonio, Texas	

=== Film ===
Andrews appeared three times on Maury (the Maury Povich Show) and on The Tyra Banks Show. She was also a make-up artist on the Maury Povich show in New York City. In 2007, Andrews did a cameo in Jennifer Lopez's music video, Do It Well from her Brave album, but does not appear in the final edition; And had a cameo as a street walker on Maroon 5's music video (at the 2:09 mark) Won't Go Home Without You from It Won't Be Soon Before Long album. In 2011, she appeared as the love interest in Deborah Vial's music video for the single Don't Make Me Take It from her debut album, Stages and Stones.

Andrews' screen appearances included the United Kingdom-produced documentary Trantasia (2008) which chronicled Andrews' participation in The World's Most Beautiful Transsexual Contest in Las Vegas, Nevada. In 2010, she starred in a supporting role in the revenge-horror-exploitation film Ticked-Off Trannies with Knives.

Year	Title	Role	Notes
2010	Ticked-Off Trannies with Knives	Emma Grashun	

=== Music video ===
Year	Artist	Album	Title	Role	Notes
2011	Deborah Vial	Stages and Stones	Don't Make Me Take It	As Deborah Vial's love interest	Andrews debuts at the 0:42 time marker of the video.

Awards and achievements
Preceded by (United States) Mimi Marks	Miss International Queen; 2006	Succeeded by (Thailand) Tanyarat Jirapatpakon
