= Isabella Santiago =

Venezuelan actress and model (born 1991)

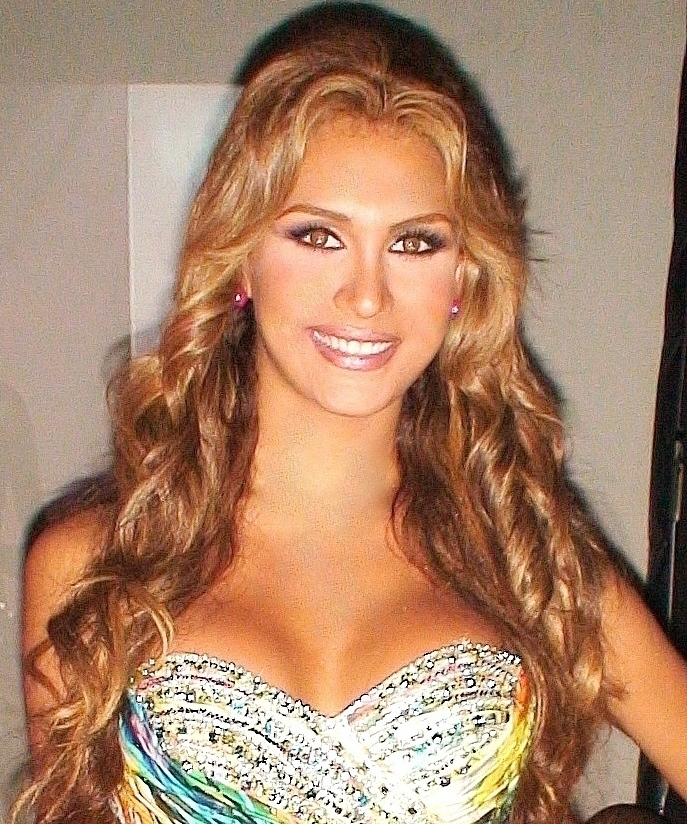
- Santiago in 2014
- Born: February 18, 1991 (age 35); Caracas, Venezuela
- Occupations: Actress and model
- Beauty pageant titleholder
- Years active: 2014–present
- Major competitions: Super Sireyna Worldwide 2014; (2nd Runner-Up); Miss International Queen 2014; (Winner); MGI All Stars 1st Edition; (Top 18)

Isabella Santiago (born February 18, 1991) is a Venezuelan actress and model.

== Career ==
Isabella is the first Venezuelan transgender actress and model to win the Thai beauty pageant Miss International Queen, for which she received an award of $12 500 US dollars and a cosmetic surgery. In 2021, she obtained her first lead role in the Colombian telenovela, Lala's Spa, at the Colombian television network, RCN Televisión.

== Personal life ==
Isabella Santiago resides in Bogotá, Colombia.

== Filmography ==
Television
| Year | Title | Character | Comments |
|---|---|---|---|
| 2018 | Nadie me quita lo bailao | Mónica Tróchez | Recurring role |
| 2021 | Lala's Spa | Lala Jiménez / Eduardo "Lalo" Jiménez | Lead role |
| 2024 | La casa de los famosos Colombia | Herself | Contestant |

== See also ==
- Miss International Queen

Awards and achievements
| Preceded by (Brazil) Marcela Ohio | Miss International Queen; 2014 | Succeeded by (Philippines) Trixie Maristela |
