= Mimi Marks =

American entertainer (born 1967)

- Born: February 11, 1967 (age 59); Waterloo, Iowa, U.S.
- Occupation: Entertainer

Mimi Marks (born February 11, 1967) is an American entertainer.

== Early life ==
Mimi was born in Waterloo, Iowa, but grew up in Oelwein, Iowa. As a child, she recalls feeling "uncomfortable in her body," and had the "most difficult time" in her physical education class because, she says, "I didn't fit in at all."

== Later life ==
After undergoing some surgery for sex reassignment (due to stipulations in employment contracts, Marks has not had complete sex reassignment), Marks became Mimi. According to Trantasia, a transgender beauty pageant documentary, she has lived as a woman since she was 21 years old. Marks started performing in Milwaukee at a club called Dance, Dance, Dance with help from an Australian performer, Holly Brown. Marks says that, for trans women in Chicago, the test of whether they can pass as women is to appear in public at Wrigley Field, home of the Chicago Cubs: "If you could walk through Wrigley-ville, like, during a Cubs game and not get 'spooked,' and not have anybody call you out, you were like the 'girl-iest' girl, you made it. I called [a friend] and said, 'I am at a Cubs game on first base, eleventh row. I made it. I'm a girl!'"

In 1986, Marks won her first pageant title: Ms. Waterloo 1986. In 1992, she won the Miss Continental competition which is based in Chicago, Illinois. 13 years later, she took home the Miss International Queen crown. The pageant was held in Pattaya, Thailand.

In 2008, Marks appeared in Janet Jackson's music video "Rock With U".

She performed at The Baton Show Lounge in Chicago, Illinois, until retiring from the stage in January 2016.

Awards and achievements
Preceded by (Thailand) Treechada Petcharat	Miss International Queen; 2005	Succeeded by (Mexico) Erica Andrews
