= Brave New Girls =

Canadian television series

- Starring: Jenna Talackova
- Country of origin: Canada
- No. of seasons: 1
- No. of episodes: 8

Production
- Production company: Peacock Alley Entertainment

Original release
- Network: E! Canada
- Release: 19 January 2014 – present

Brave New Girls is a Canadian television reality series, which premiered on E! Canada on January 19, 2014.

The series stars Jenna Talackova, a trans woman who became a media figure in 2012 when she waged a successful legal battle to be allowed to compete in the Miss Universe Canada beauty pageant, as she moves to Toronto to establish a career as a model. It also depicts Talackova's interactions with her two closest friends in the city, her cousin Angela Perry and her Miss Universe co-contestant Dajana Radovanovic, as well as following her experiences on the dating scene and undertaking several trips to cities in the United States in pursuit of modelling work.

Produced by Peacock Alley Entertainment, the series was filmed in the summer and fall 2013. After completing filming, Talackova took a vacation in South Korea, and continues to balance her career aspirations as a model with her studies in holistic nutrition.

Talackova had been offered several reality show deals, both in Canada and the United States, but rejected the other offers for being overly sensationalist about her transgender identity. One of the offers she rejected was a Bachelorette-style dating game show in which her transgender status would have been revealed to the winning contestant as a "shock twist" at the end of the series.
