= Eddie Mercado =

Filipino actor (1938–2006)

- Born: Eduardo Mercado; August 20, 1938; Manila, Philippines
- Died: September 18, 2006 (aged 68); Parañaque, Philippines
- Other name: Eddie
- Occupations: Actor, host
- Spouse: Marivic Yee
- Children: 6

Eduardo "Eddie" Mercado (August 20, 1938 – September 18, 2006) was a Filipino film actor, television actor, film director, television director, and television presenter. Known for his signature voice, he earned himself the title, "Frank Sinatra of the Philippines".

== Personal life ==
Mercado was born on August 20, 1938. He was married to Marivic Yee. He had six children: Coily, Bobbi, Candy, CJ, Chevy and Eric, and two grandchildren: Harper and Pauline. He loved to sing Frank Sinatra songs. He is also the brother of actress Mila Ocampo and the uncle of actress Snooky Serna.

== Career ==
One of the earliest shows that Mercado hosted and for which he gained fame and popularity was the Darigold Jamboree (1969) Bulilit Contest on Channel 11 which he co-hosted with Leila Benitez. His first radio show was Teenage Slam Bang.

Among the more successful products of the contest were Richard Merk, who was champion for 18 weeks, and Nora Aunor who reigned as champion for 14 weeks. During his time, Mercado was the most sought-after host of beauty contests and other big events in the country. He was the original host for Mutya ng Pilipinas, Miss Asia/Pacific, Ms. Makati, Miss Chinatown and Miss Gay Philippines, the longest running alternative pageant. Before he became sick, he was the regular host of Pagcor shows and big bingo events as well as the grand draws of the different promos by Fortune Tobacco Corporation (now PMFTC). Richard Merk, to whom he gave a show business break, organized a fund raising concert for Mercado, held at Merk's Bar Bistro, to support an operation to remove part of his scalp. He appeared on TV shows like Winner Takes All in 1972 as a host, DJ Dance Time as host, and Pasikatan Sa 13 in 1990s. His final TV appearance was Wish Ko Lang in 2006.

Mercado is a radio personality in several radio stations such as DZRJ, DWBR and RJ-FM. He has also appeared in several films such as Checkered Flag or Crash, Ikaw Naman and Iiyak, Wanted: Perfect Mother and Swinging Jet-Age.

== Awards and nominations ==
Awards and nominations
| Year | Award giving body | Category | Nominated work/ Person | Results |
|---|---|---|---|---|
| 1973 | 1973 FAMAS Awards | Best Supporting Actor | Eddie Mercado, Dito Sa Aking Puso | Included |

== Later years and Death ==
In May 2003, Mercado suffered a stroke and underwent brain surgery to remove the blood clot.He died at around 3:30 pm on September 18, 2006, at the Parañaque Medical Center following multiple organ failure. He was cremated at the Trinity Funeral Homes, and his wake was held at the Alabang New Life Christian Center.
