= Veena Sendre =

Transgender activist

Veena Sendre (born 1994) is a trans woman from Chhattisgarh. She worked with a non-governmental organisation and led a grassroots movement to push for gender equality. She was the first to win the Miss Trans Queen title in 2018.

== Early life ==
Sendre was born as a boy in Mandir Hasaud area of Raipur, Chhattisgarh, India. She was a drop out in Class 5 due to stigma at school and she realised her gender due to her feelings in the pre-teen years but was persuaded to rejoin the school again after a few years. Though her parents, opposed initially, later they accepted her and she underwent a sex change operation in 2019. She changed her name from Vinay to Veena and her mother, Urmila Sendre, stood by her. She settled in Raipur, her native place, and became a transgender activist. She joined the Indian National Congress in 2019.

== Career ==
In 2018, she attended the Pride party. The Keshav Suri Foundation organised the first 'National dialogue on queering the pitch - Agents of change', in the state's capital.

In 2019, she met chief minister Bhupesh Baghel and joined the Indian National Congress Party before leaving for Miss International Queen 2019 in Bangkok on 25 February. She is also a fashion queen and model and has walked the ramp in Bengaluru and Lucknow.

=== Beauty pageant ===
Sendre won the title of Trans Queen in the national level beauty contest held in Mumbai in 2018. She beat Namita Ammu of Tamil Nadu and Sanya Sood, in the final two rounds. Earlier, she won the Miss Chhattisgarh contest. She thanked people after the victory and said that it is not her personal victory but the victory of the entire transgender community. It is the first time that such a contest was conducted in India.
