= Miss International Queen 2013 =

Transgender female beauty contest

- Date: 1 November 2013
- Presenters: Puwanart Kunpalin; Saraichatt Jirapaet
- Entertainment: Kevin Balot
- Venue: Pattaya, Thailand
- Broadcaster: Channel 3 (Thailand)
- Entrants: 25
- Placements: 10
- Winner: Marcela Ohio; Brazil

Miss International Queen 2013 was the 9th Miss International Queen pageant, held in Pattaya, Thailand, on November 1, 2013.

Kevin Balot of the Philippines crowned her successor, Marcela Ohio of Brazil at the end of the event.

== Contestants ==
25 contestants competed for the title.

No	Country or territory	Contestant	Placements
01	Myanmar	Tanya Maung	
02	Brazil	Roberta Holanda	Top 10
03	Australia	Sharleng Gonzalez	
04	Venezuela	Chanel	
05	Philippines	Godiva Marie Archacia	
06	Japan	Seri Fujinomiya	Top 10
07	Malaysia	Nur Sajat	Top 10
08	Spain	Carolina Medina	
09	Thailand	Nethnapada Kanlayanon	2nd Runner-up
10	Australia	Victoria Martin	
12	Japan	Annabel Yu	
13	Indonesia	Angeline Hanum	
14	Philippines	Andrea Justine Aliman	
15	South Africa	Anastasia Jemiskavegus	Top 10
16	Brazil	Marcela Ohio	WINNER
17	Venezuela	Nohemi Nontilla	
18	Malaysia	Patricia Asyeera Wong	
19	South Korea	Arisa Kim	
20	United States	Shantell D'Marco	1st Runner-up
21	Japan	Satsuki Nishihara	Top 10
22	Brazil	Veronica Haddad	
23	Philippines	Kristina Cassandra Ybarra	Top 10
24	India	Angela	
25	Germany	Renata Ferreira	Top 10
26	Singapore	Anne Patricia Lee	
