= Piyadar Inthavong =

Lao model

- Born: Piyadar Inthavong; 13 November 1992 (age 33); Pakse, Laos
- Other names: Lingling, Lingling Piyadar, Ling Piyada, Nong
- Occupation: Model
- Years active: 2014–present

Piyadar Inthavong (Lao: ປີຍາດາ ອິນທະວົງ ; born on 13 November 1992), better known by the names Lingling (Lao: ຫລິງຫລິງ), Lingling Piyadar (Lao: ຫລິງຫລິງ ປີຍາດາ), Ling Piyada (Lao: ຫລິງ ປີຍາດາ) or Nong (Lao: ນົງ) is a Lao transgender model based in Thailand.

== Biography ==
Born male to an upper-middle-class family in Champasak Province, Laos, where her parents are doctors, and the oldest of 4 children, Piyadar had always felt like a girl when she was young. When she became a teenager, she "was embarrassed to dress as a man". After a trip to Thailand where she saw how beautiful transgender girls were, Piyadar decided to transition to become a girl and sought the blessings of her conservative father to undergo a full sex change. She completed her sex reassignment surgery in Thailand at the age of 19.

Piyadar has said that surgery has made her more confident "wearing tight pants" and as a woman.

After her transition, Piyadar went to Thailand to seek opportunities and kick start her modeling career as she has long held aspirations to become a model.

== Miss International Queen 2014 ==
During a promotional event for the 2014 edition of the Miss International Queen transgender beauty pageant, Piyadar shot to prominence when she posted a picture of herself with famous Thai transgender actress and model Poyd Treechada on her Instagram account. Her stunning beauty and complexion led to direct comparisons between herself and Poyd, and as a representative of Laos she was a hot favourite to win the title in the pageant.

Subsequently, Piyadar came in as a second runner-up. The Miss International Queen 2014 crown was won by Isabella Santiago of Venezuela.

Awards and achievements
Preceded by (Thailand) Nethnapada Kanrayanon	2nd Runner-up Miss International Queen; 2014	Succeeded by (Thailand) Sopida Siriwattananukoon
