= Kevin Balot =

Filipina actress and model (born 1986)

- Born: September 25, 1991 (age 35); Tarlac, Philippines
- Beauty pageant titleholder
- Title: Miss International Queen 2012
- No. of films: Die Beautiful
- Major competitions: Miss Gay Manila 2012; (Winner); Miss International Queen 2012; (Winner)

Kevin Roxas Balot (born November 25, 1991) is a Filipino model, actress, and beauty pageant titleholder, who was crowned Miss International Queen 2012, making her the first Filipino transgender woman to win the pageant.

== Early life and education ==
Balot was born to Renato and Liberty Balot. She has two sisters, Karen and Kimberly. As a child, her father, Renato, wanted her to be an engineer. This and other gendered expectations, such as criticism for wearing make-up, made it difficult for Balot to find acceptance from her family.

After graduating high school, she lived on her own and entered LGBTQIA++ beauty pageants in order to finance her college studies as a nursing student. She has a degree in BS nursing, and as of 2012 worked as a volunteer nurse. That year she also accepted a job teaching English in Thailand.

== Beauty pageants and modeling ==
In 2012, Balot won Miss International Queen in Pattaya, Thailand. Her winnings included US$13,000 and, if she wanted, a free gender-affirming surgery. Balot went on to accept this offer.

In 2018, Balot became one of Pantene's ambassadors for their #StrongerNow campaign.

== Personal life ==
Kevin Roxas Balot is transgender.

== Filmography ==
She played Tonet from the 2016 film Die Beautiful. She was also part of the music video during 2019 titled "Di Lahat" by Donnalyn Bartolome and was part on a TV series titled "Luv U" that was aired on 2015.

== See also ==
- Miss International Queen

Awards and achievements
Preceded by (Thailand) Sirapassorn Atthayakorn	Miss International Queen; 2012	Succeeded by (Brazil) Marcela Ohio
