= Jenna Talackova =

Canadian transgender model (born 1988)

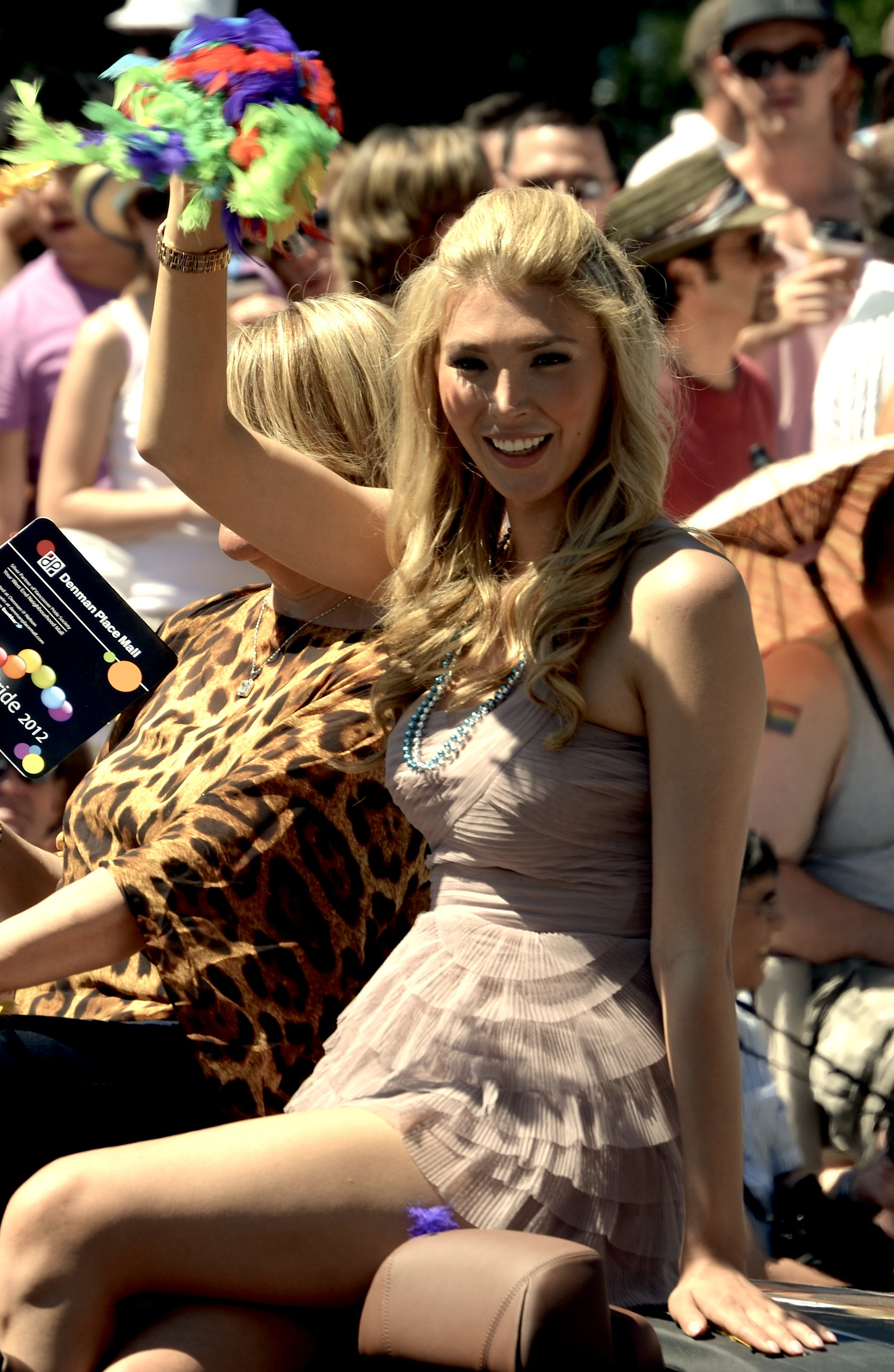
- Talackova as grand marshal of the 2012 Vancouver Pride parade
- Born: October 15, 1988 (age 38); Vancouver, British Columbia, Canada
- Occupations: Model, television personality
- Known for: Miss Universe Canada pageant competitor

Jenna Talackova (born October 15, 1988) is a Canadian model, television personality and beauty pageant titleholder who gained media attention in 2012 when she successfully waged a legal battle to be allowed to compete in the Miss Universe Canada after being initially disqualified for being transgender.

== Early life ==
Talackova was born and raised in Vancouver, British Columbia. Her father is Czech, and her mother is a member of the Babine First Nation, from the Lake Babine Nation in British Columbia.

She experienced gender dysphoria beginning in early childhood, and began her gender transition at age 14, while attending Vancouver's Killarney Secondary School, before completing her sex reassignment surgery at 19. She initially took the name "Page" when she began transitioning, before changing it again to Jenna.

As of 2012, Talackova was a student of holistic nutrition.

== Miss Universe Canada ==
After previously competing in the 2010 Miss International Queen pageant for transgender and transsexual women in Thailand, Talackova registered to compete in Miss Universe Canada 2012. Sources are in conflict as to whether she identified herself as transgender on her application; however, after she was selected as one of the Top 65 applicants who would proceed to the pageant, a person who recognized her from Miss International Queen contacted the Miss Universe Canada organizers, and the organization then disqualified Talackova on the grounds that the pageant rules required its competitors to be "naturally born" women.

Talackova subsequently contacted lawyer Gloria Allred, who took on the case and challenged the pageant organizers, including future U.S. president Donald Trump in his capacity as owner of the international Miss Universe organization, to reverse the decision and allow Talackova to compete. The organization reversed its decision before the case reached the courts, with Trump's office issuing a statement that "as long as she meets the standards of legal gender recognition requirements of Canada, which we understand that she does, Jenna Talackova is free to compete in the 2012 Miss Universe Canada pageant."

At the pageant on May 19, 2012, Talackova made it into the Top 12, but failed to reach the Top 5. She was, however, one of four contestants awarded the title of Miss Congeniality. Talackova was named co-grand marshal of the 2012 Vancouver Pride Parade in recognition of her fight to be in the Miss Universe pageant.

== Television ==
A reality show based around her life, Brave New Girls, was filmed in summer 2013 as Talackova moved to Toronto to pursue a modelling career. The series, produced by Peacock Alley Entertainment, premiered on E! Canada in January 2014.

== Personal life ==
Talackova is a vegan and appeared in a PETA ad campaign promoting the diet.
