= Trixie Maristela =

Filipina actress and model

- Born: Manila, Philippines
- Education: University of the Philippines
- Beauty pageant titleholder
- Agency: GMA Network (2014–present); APT Entertainment (2014); VIVA Artists Agency (2014–present); TV5 (2020–present)
- Years active: 2014–present
- Major competitions: Super Sireyna Worldwide 2014 (1st Runner-up); Miss International Queen 2015 (Winner)

Trixie Maristela is a Filipina actress, model, beauty queen titleholder as well as a European Languages graduate major in Spanish minor in French languages from the University of the Philippines. Now based in Melbourne, Australia. She finished her master's degree in Professional Accounting.

== Career ==
In May 2014, she joined Philippines's most prestigious transgender beauty pageant on national television, Eat Bulaga!'s Super Sireyna Worldwide. She had a chance to compete with other transgender beauty icons from all around the world. She ended as 1st runner-up.

In May 2015, she joined the first ever Miss Trans Manila and crowned winner.

In October 2015, Maristela and her partner Art Sta. Ana published a book named He's Dating The Transgender. The book is a memoir about Sta. Ana falling in love with Maristela.

In November 2015, she joined the Miss International Queen transgender beauty pageant in Pattaya, Thailand. She was crowned as the winner.

In February 2016, Maristela starred on GMA's drama anthology series Karelasyon, her first acting role on television. She played the role of Queen, a transgender woman who never stops loving despite her complicated love life. She also starred in another drama anthology series Magpakailanman on an episode that features the real-life story of Maristela.

== Education ==
Trixie Maristela studied European languages major in Spanish and minor in French at UP Diliman.

== Filmography ==
=== Television ===
Year	Title	Role
2016	Sunday PinaSaya	Ms. Sampaguita
2016	Magpakailanman: Love Knows No Gender (I'm Dating A Transgender)	Herself / Trixie
2016	Karelasyon: Transwoman (Ang Kakaibang Kalaguyo Ni Mister)	Queen
2016	ASAP	Cameo Appearance
2015	2015 Metro Manila Film Festival Awards Night	Host / Presenter
2015	Tunay Na Buhay	Herself / Guest Appearance
2015	It's Showtime	Herself / Guest Appearance
2015	Umagang Kay Ganda	Herself / Guest Appearance
2015	CelebriTV	Herself / Guest Appearance
2015	Rated K	Herself / Guest Appearance
2015	Pinagpalang Ama: Eat Bulaga Lenten Drama Special 2015	Cameo Appearance
2014; 2015	Celebrity Bluff	Herself / Contestant
2014; 2015	Unang Hirit	Herself / Guest Appearance
2014	Eat Bulaga!	Herself / Guest Appearance / Super Sireyna Worldwide Contestant

== See also ==
- Miss International Queen

Awards and achievements
Preceded by (Venezuela) Isabella Santiago	Miss International Queen; 2015	Succeeded by (Thailand) Jiratchaya Sirimongkolnawin
