= Nur Sajat =

Malaysian-born; Australian-based entrepreneur and activist (born 1985)

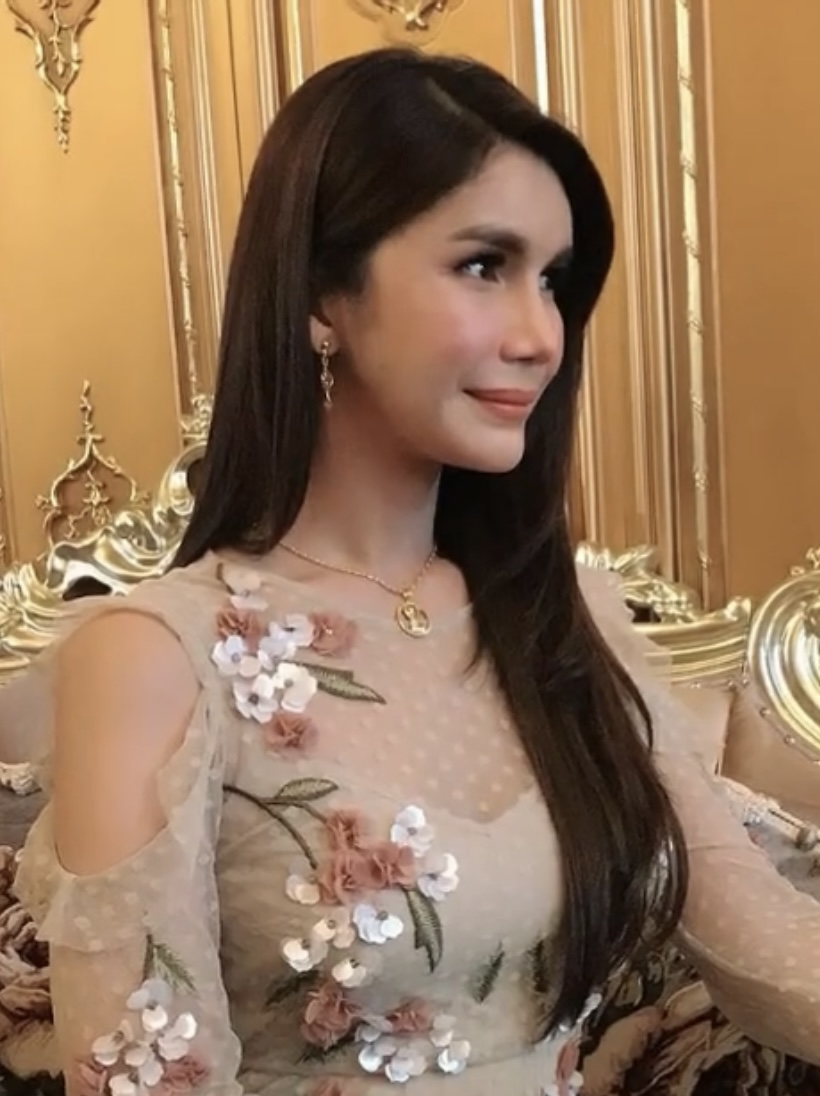
- Born: Muhammad Sajjad bin Kamaruz Zaman; 23 February 1985 (age 41); Setiawan, Perak, Malaysia
- Occupations: Entrepreneur; Social media influencer
- Spouse: Muhammad Adam bin Assufi (2009–present)
- Partner(s): Fariz Raeza (2011–2013); Faez Nick (2014–2016); Coach Tishrin @ Yin (2017–2019)
- Children: 2

Sajjad Kamaruz Zaman (born 23 February 1985), better known as Nur Sajat (also formerly known as Sajat Fariz), is a Malaysian-born and now Australian transgender entrepreneur, and reality television host. Nur Sajat is an icon for transgender and LGBT rights in Malaysia in general.

== Biography ==
Sajat took part in a transgender beauty contest in Thailand in 2013. In 2017, she announced she was identifying fully as a female. Sajat founded her own cosmetics company, having developed her own skincare and health supplements, and a corset carrying her brand name.

In 2020, Nur Sajat sparked outrage after posting photos from her pilgrimage to Mecca, wearing female prayer attire and makeup. Her actions drew criticism from Malaysia's religious affairs minister, who expressed concern over potential diplomatic tensions with Saudi Arabia. Reports suggest Sajat has since been removed from Mecca following the incident.

In January 2021, she was arrested and charged with “insulting Islam” for wearing traditional women's clothing in her own premises during a 2018 religious event. She fled to Thailand in February 2021, but the Malaysian government convinced Thai authorities to detain her. She was released on bail and is now living in Australia, where she was granted asylum and continues operating her business.
