= Miss International Queen =

Beauty pageant for transgender women

- Type: International beauty pageant for transgender women
- Parent organization: Tiffany's Show Pattaya Co., Ltd.
- Headquarters: Pattaya, Chonburi Province, Thailand
- First edition: 2004
- Most recent edition: 2026
- Current titleholder: Lo Colby; United States
- President: Alisa Phanthusak
- Honorary Advisor: Seree Wongmontha
- Language: English, Thai
- Website: www.missinternationalqueen.com

Miss International Queen is the world's biggest beauty pageant for transgender women. The pageant was conceived in 2004 and named the largest and most prestigious transgender pageant by CNN original American documentary television series This Is Life with Lisa Ling aired on 26 November 2017.

The pageant is owned and run by Thailand-based Tiffany's Show Pattaya Co, Ltd. It has been held annually in Pattaya City, Thailand since 2004. The mission of the pageant is LGBTQ and Transgender awareness and equality in both society and workforce, while all the monetary profits of the actual televised show goes to the Royal Charity AIDS Foundation of Thailand.

The current titleholder is Lo Colby from the United States, who won on 19 September 2026.

== History ==
The Miss International Queen official website states that the beauty pageant was established with the intent to, "offer an international competition for transgender women from around the world and to provide an opportunity for transgender women to be more accepted in today's world, to create transgender rights awareness among international communities and to build friendship and exchange ideas among international lesbian, gay, bisexual and transgender/transsexual communities."

== Pageant requirements ==
The contestants must have been born male, can be pre- or post-operation and between the ages of 18 and 35. In addition, participants can only represent their country of birth or that listed in their passport and must not have previously joined any publication/website/adult film/prostitution showcasing nudity. Previous winners or runner-up contestants are not allowed to join again. Repeat non-placement candidates are allowed to re-submit their credentials and application.

Only about 25 semi-final contestants chosen would go on to compete in the final round and are required to participate in two weeks of activities: photo shoots, luncheons with city officials, dinner with the press, sponsor visits and community outreach, similar conditions to competitors in other beauty pageants. The final show will be aired on Thai television as well as live online streaming.

=== Crown design and prize ===
In 2011, the crown for Miss International Queen Crown was re-designed by an inspiration of butterflies and the crown of Lady Liberty. The butterflies were intended to symbolize beauty found in nature and the idea of rebirth. The crown remains with the Miss International Queen Organization at an estimated value of US$10,000. The Miss International Queen winner receives cash prize of 450,000 Thai baht (about US$15,000), many sponsor gifts, an apartment at Woodlands Resort Pattaya during her reign and memories that last a lifetime.

=== Charity trademarks ===
Miss International Queen is a registered trademark and a non-profit sector of the organizer Tiffany's Show Pattaya Co., Ltd., world's largest transgender cabaret show since 1974 and sponsored by Tourism Authority of Thailand. All the monetary profits of the final televised show goes to the Royal Charity AIDS Foundation of Thailand.

=== Transgender inclusion in pageants ===
According to recent studies, transgender individuals are often the victims of social and political discrimination. The Miss International Queen pageant offers contestants the opportunity to compete and showcase their talent and beauty in an LGBTQ friendly environment.

== Transgender pageant cases ==
Recent events have drawn attention to the treatment of transgender pageant contestants and how their personal identification impacts their eligibility. There have been instances where transgender and transsexual pageant winners have lost their title for not being "transgender enough". On the other hand, certain participants have also been disqualified from cisgender female pageants for not being a "natural born female". In 2012, Jenna Talackova who participated in Miss International Queen in 2010 was disqualified from Miss Universe Canada on the basis of competing as a woman when she was born a male. Supporters of Talackova argue that there were no rules explicitly banning transsexuals from competing. Talackova joined in the 2010 Miss International Queen competition. This instance sparked a debate as to how Talackova's gender identification affected her eligibility to compete in both competitions. Talackova argued that if she was transgender, she could participate in transgender pageants. At the same time, if she identified as a woman, she would have had the right to participate fairly in the Miss Universe Canada competition. Jenna Talackova's case is one that brings awareness to the public perception and personal opinions pertaining to transgender people competing in pageants.

A similar case occurred later in 2016 when the winner of the Miss Transgender UK, Jai Dara Latto, was stripped of her title after pageant organizers claimed she was not living "full time" as a woman. This was after footage was uncovered of Latto walking around in boxers rather than female undergarments. Latto was pegged as a "drag queen" rather than a transgender woman and proceeded to forfeit her pageant title and earnings. Latto pledged to walk thirty miles in high heels in honor of transgender rights after the allegations.

Both Talackova and Latto's cases raise the question as to who is eligible to win a cisgender pageant and also what qualifications or standards must be met in order for a transgender pageant winner to retain her title. Participants are eligible to compete and win the title of Miss International Queen if they were born male and their sexual or gender identification is that of a female. These recent events have sparked a debate involving the social inclusion and equality that is associated with an individual's sexual and gender identification.

== Public perception of transgender beauty pageants ==
General attitudes towards pageants like Miss International Queen vary among members of the population. Studies have suggested that some people are in favor of transgender inclusion in beauty pageants, while others argue that it is only fair that they compete in pageants that are exclusively for transgender contestants. Although the premise of pageants has varying opinions as well, competitions like Miss International Queen offer the same opportunity to transgender women that individuals who were born female and identify as one have. Recent publications and studies claim that beauty pageants have negative impacts, while other sources suggest that pageants portray the intersectionality and dynamics of gender politics, sexual orientation, and cultural stigmas.

=== Kathoeys and inclusion ===
Thailand is well known for its high rates of sex tourism, especially in Pattaya. Miss International Queen pageant and its organization is aiming to show the transgender women that there are alternative career choices. Kathoey typically refers to a transgender woman or a very feminine acting male. A kathoey is often called a ladyboy in the English language. Although Thailand is much more accepting of transgender people than most other countries, the LQBTQ+ community remains stigmatized. Cultural norms still suggest that someone's hobbies, mannerisms, and interests should match one's gender. So, even though kathoeys are accepted in society, a cisgender male working a typically female job is still looked down upon. But, in October 1997, Thailand released a constitution that called for equal rights and treatment for all people, regardless of race, sex, gender, and more. Therefore, Thai culture slowly started to accept all individuals.

=== Sex reassignment surgery ===
Trans culture is very prevalent in Thailand due to extensive medical research done and sex-change surgeries. The first documented sex change in Thailand was in 1975, and attitudes and surgical techniques have improved much since then. On 25 November 2009, the Thailand Medical Council released a policy that was titled "Criteria for the treatment of sex change, Census 2009". Since this policy change, ninety percent of those who received a sex change operation are foreigners to Thailand.

== Self-esteem ==
Transgender beauty pageants like Miss International Queen celebrate the contestants and promote awareness of the transgender community. Studies have shown that competing in prestigious beauty pageants are linked to higher levels of self-esteem. These higher levels of self-esteem can stem from a stronger sense of identity experienced after competing against other transgender women. However, finishing as winners or runners-up in the beauty pageants did not further increase levels of self-esteem and confidence. Instead, simply increasing the number of competitions were found to be much more effective in raising self-esteem. This information shows that the result of the beauty pageant is less important in terms of self-esteem than participation in the beauty pageant itself.

=== Fair competition in female pageants ===
Transgender-only beauty pageants provide a way for transgender women to fairly compete against one another. Inclusion of transgender women in all-female beauty pageants like Miss Universe is not only less common, but raise questions about fairness of competition. One viewpoint argues that though it is politically correct to include transgender women in beauty pageants, it does not promote the spirit of a fair competition. An analogy given for this theory is through the sex segregation of sports based on physical differences. As most female track and field sprinters cannot run faster than male track and field sprinters because of physiological differences, transgender women cannot always portray the feminine beauty norms that judges in popular beauty pageants critique contestants on. For example, some transgender women cannot achieve the certain look that comes from the wider hips that women tend to have. However, the theory acknowledges that it is difficult to determine which physical inequalities are actually relevant in judging feminine beauty and creating a fair competition. With transgender-only beauty pageants, these inequalities are gone and a platform for equal competition can be established.

=== Judgment in pageants ===
This pageant is owned by Tiffany's Show of Pattaya City, Thailand. Thai contestants qualify for the competition by winning the title of Miss Tiffany's Universe which also owned by the same company. There has been controversy over the look and race of the winners of each year. Over its entirety, an African diaspora trans woman won the crown for the first time in 2019.

=== Beauty pageants and politics ===
Studies show that participating in beauty pageants can aid in achieving political office. In the United States, a significant 12 percent of all female governors competed in beauty pageants. Many of the same skills required to compete and do well in beauty pageants apply to politics as well. Some of these overlapping skills include public speaking, poise under pressure, and solicitation of funds. Pageant winners are often viewed as representatives of their hometown, state, or country. This experience in representing one's hometown in beauty pageants have been shown to translate over to prowess in political representation as well.

The number of transgender politicians and beauty pageants are relatively low when compared to their cisgender counterparts. However, beauty pageants can still serve as a way for transgender people to attain political office because the same dynamics of cisgender beauty pageants are present in transgender pageants. Transgender beauty pageants like Miss International Queen not only bring fame and name recognition to its winners, but provide a platform to bring awareness to transgender politics. Transgender beauty pageants represent a springboard to future opportunities for many transgender individuals.

== Titleholders ==
| Edition | Year | Date | Miss International Queen | Runners-ups | | Location | No. | Ref. |
| Edition | Year | Date | Miss International Queen | First | Second | Location | No. | Ref. |
|---|---|---|---|---|---|---|---|---|
| 1st | 2004 | November 6 | Treechada Petcharat; Thailand | Arisha Rani; India | Ma. Christina Dandan; Philippines | Pattaya, Chonburi, Thailand | 22 | |
| 2nd | 2005 | October 29 | Mimi Marks; United States | Yu Ri; South Korea | Tiptantree Rujiranon; Thailand | Pattaya, Chonburi, Thailand | 23 | |
| 3rd | 2006 | October 29 | Erica Andrews; Mexico | Patricia Montecarlo; Philippines | Ratravee Jiraprapakul; Thailand | Pattaya, Chonburi, Thailand | 23 | |
| 4th | 2007 | November 10 | Tanyarat Jirapatpakon; Thailand | Aleika Barros; Brazil | Chanel Madrigal; Philippines | Pattaya, Chonburi, Thailand | 24 | |
2008 No contest due to Political Turmoil
| 5th | 2009 | October 31 | Ai Haruna; Japan | Kangsadal Wongdusadeekul; Thailand | Daniela Margues; Brazil | Pattaya, Chonburi, Thailand | 18 | |
| 6th | 2010 | November 19 | Mini Han; South Korea | Ami Takeuchi; Japan | Stasha Sanchez; United States | Pattaya, Chonburi, Thailand | 20 | |
| 7th | 2011 | November 4 | Sirapassorn Atthayakorn; Thailand | Sahhara Henson; Nigeria | Margaret Keyan; Lebanon | Pattaya, Chonburi, Thailand | 22 | |
| 8th | 2012 | November 2 | Kevin Balot; Philippines | Jessika Simões; Brazil | Panvilas Mongkol; Thailand | Pattaya, Chonburi, Thailand | 25 | |
| 9th | 2013 | November 1 | Marcela Ohio; Brazil | Shantell D'Marco; United States | Nethnapada Kanrayanon; Thailand | Pattaya, Chonburi, Thailand | 25 | |
| 10th | 2014 | November 7 | Isabella Santiago; Venezuela | Nitsa Katrahong; Thailand | Piyadar Inthavong; Laos | Pattaya, Chonburi, Thailand | 21 | |
| 11th | 2015 | November 10 | Trixie Maristela; Philippines | Valesca Dominik Ferraz; Brazil | Sopida Siriwattananukoon; Thailand | Pattaya, Chonburi, Thailand | 26 | |
2017 No contest due to the death of King Bhumibol Adulyadej
| 12th | 2016 | March 7 | Jiratchaya Sirimongkolnawin; Thailand | Nathalie de Oliveira; Brazil | Andrea Collazo; Venezuela | Pattaya, Chonburi, Thailand | 28 | |
| 13th | 2018 | March 9 | Nguyễn Hương Giang; Vietnam | Jacqueline Gillies; Australia | Rinrada Thurapan; Thailand | Pattaya, Chonburi, Thailand | 28 | |
| 14th | 2019 | March 8 | Jazell Barbie Royale; United States | Kanwara Kaewjin; Thailand | Yaya Shi; China | Pattaya, Chonburi, Thailand | 20 | |
| 15th | 2020 | March 7 | Valentina Fluchaire; Mexico | Ruethaipreeya Nuanglee; Thailand | Ariella Moura; Brazil | Pattaya, Chonburi, Thailand | 21 | |
2021 No pageant held due to the COVID-19 pandemic
| 16th | 2022 | June 25 | Fuschia Anne Ravena; Philippines | Jassmine Jimenez; Colombia | Aëla Chanel; France | Pattaya, Chonburi, Thailand | 23 | |
| 17th | 2023 | June 24 | Solange Dekker; Netherlands | Qatrisha Zairyah Kamsir; Singapore | Melony Munro; United States | Pattaya, Chonburi, Thailand | 22 | |
| 18th | 2024 | August 24 | Catalina Marsano; Peru | Saruda Panyakham; Thailand | Nguyễn Tường San; Vietnam | Pattaya, Chonburi, Thailand | 23 | |
| 19th | 2025 | September 20 | Midori Monét; United States | Olivia Lauren; Cuba | Hà Tâm Như; Vietnam | Pattaya, Chonburi, Thailand | 23 | |
| 20th | 2026 | September 19 | Lo Colby; United States | Theerachaya Pimkitidaj; Thailand | Saki Iwai; Japan | Pattaya, Chonburi, Thailand | 27 | |

No pageant held in 2008, 2017, and 2021. (Note: No contest due to Political Turmoil) (Note: No contest due to the death of King Bhumibol Adulyadej) (Note: No contest due to the COVID-19 pandemic)

=== Gallery of winners ===
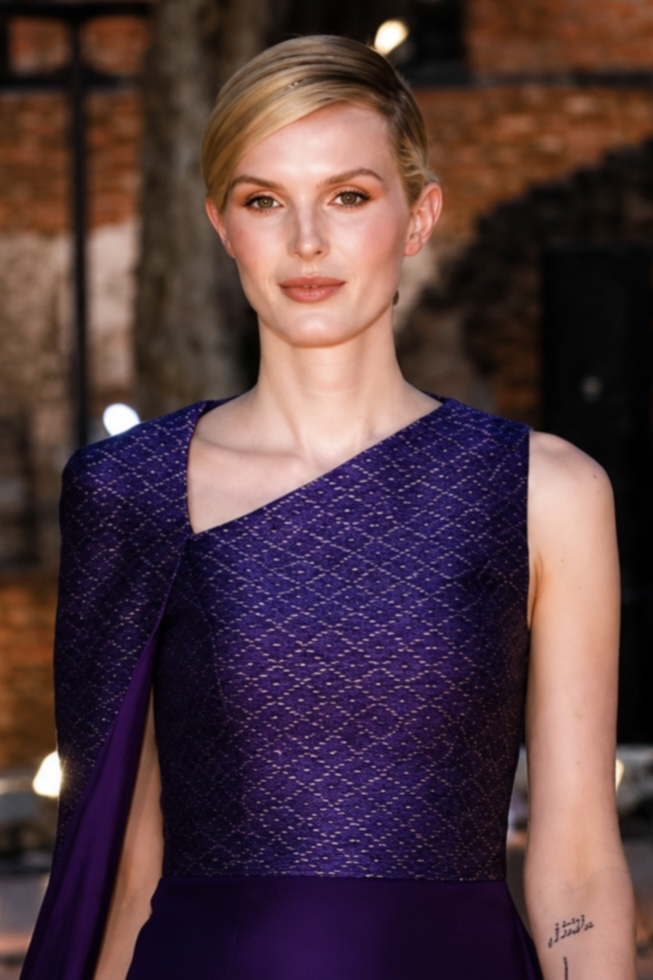
Miss International Queen 2023
Solange Dekker
Netherlands

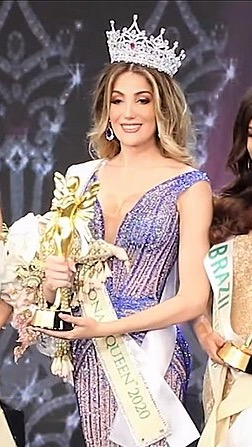
Miss International Queen 2020
Valentina Fluchaire
Mexico

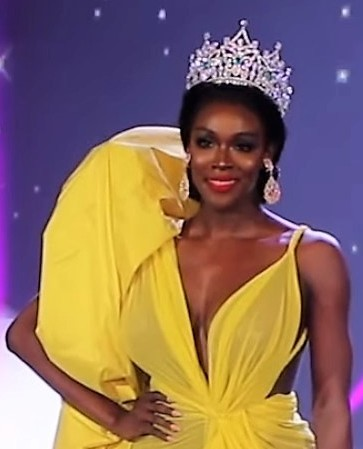
Miss International Queen 2019
Jazell Barbie Royale
United States

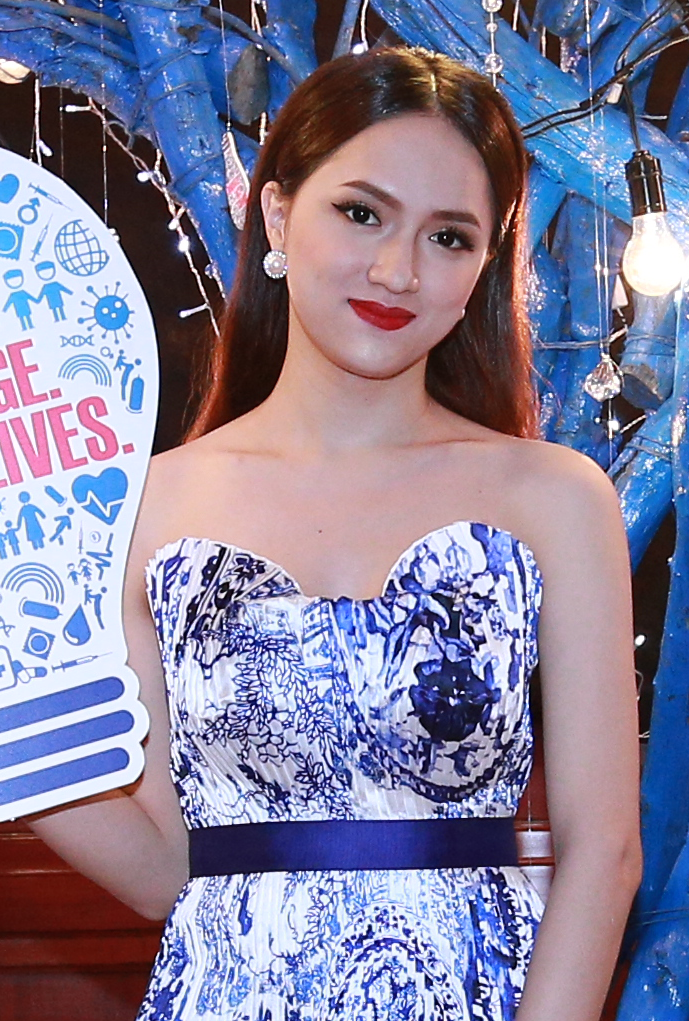
Miss International Queen 2018
Nguyễn Hương Giang
Vietnam

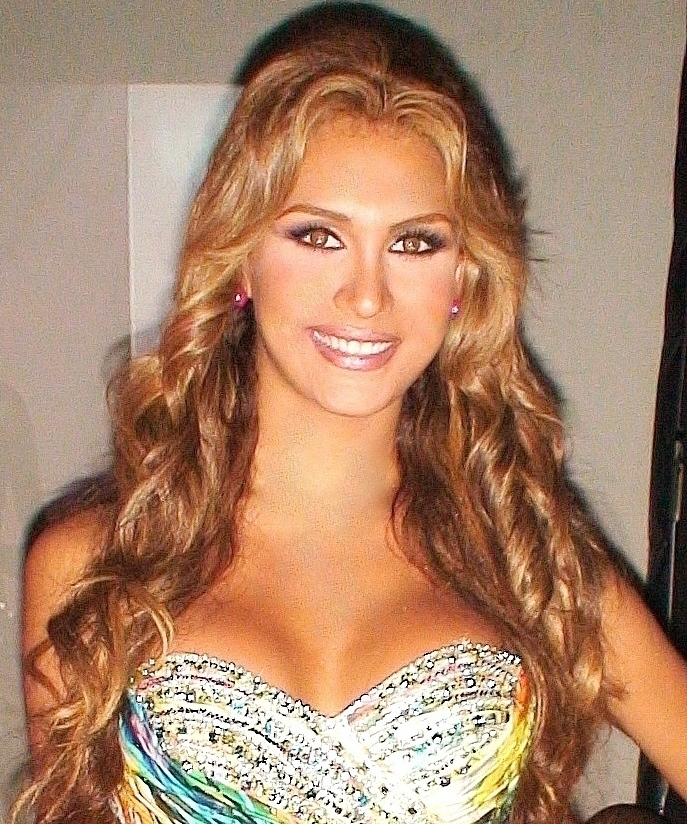
Miss International Queen 2014
Isabella Santiago
Venezuela

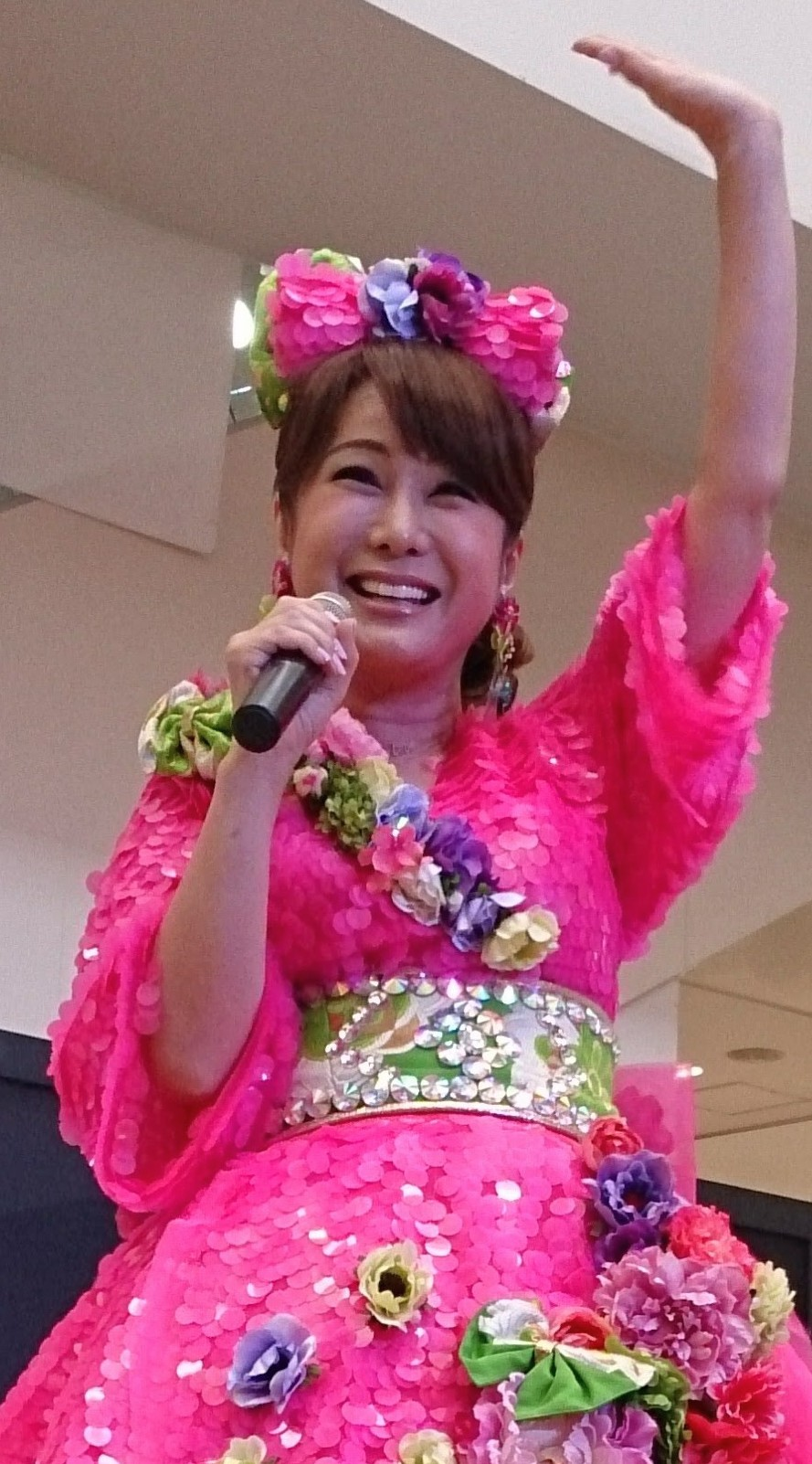
Miss International Queen 2009
Ai Haruna
Japan

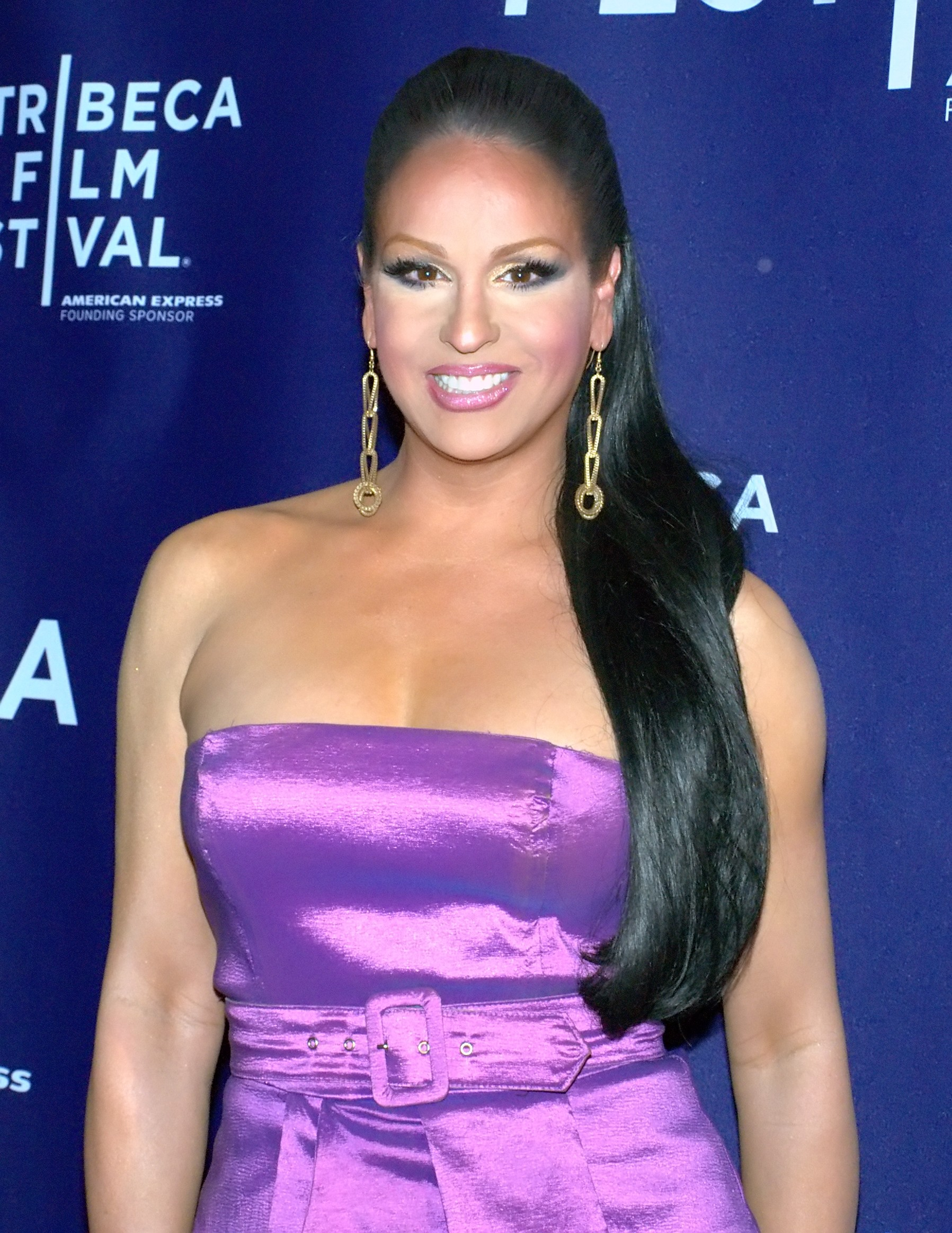
Miss International Queen 2006
Erica Andrews †
Mexico

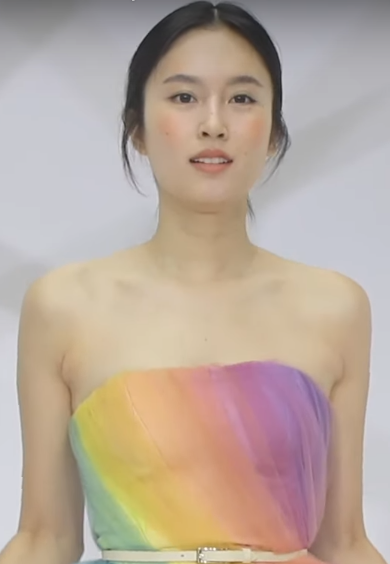
Miss International Queen 2004
Treechada Petcharat
Thailand

=== By number of wins ===
| Country/Territory | Titles | Winner Year |
|---|---|---|
| United States | 4 | 2005, 2019, 2025, 2026 |
| Thailand | 4 | 2004, 2007, 2011, 2017 |
| Philippines | 3 | 2012, 2015, 2022 |
| Mexico | 2 | 2006, 2020 |
| Peru | 1 | 2024 |
| Netherlands | 1 | 2023 |
| Vietnam | 1 | 2018 |
| Venezuela | 1 | 2014 |
| Brazil | 1 | 2013 |
| South Korea | 1 | 2010 |
| Japan | 1 | 2009 |

=== Continents by number of wins ===
| Continent or region | Titles | Years |
|---|---|---|
| Asia | 10 | 2004, 2007, 2009, 2010, 2011, 2012, 2015, 2017, 2018, 2022 |
| North America | 6 | 2005, 2006, 2019, 2020, 2025, 2026 |
| South America | 3 | 2013, 2014, 2024 |
| Europe | 1 | 2023 |
| Africa | 0 | |
| Oceania | 0 | |

== List of special awards winners ==
| Year | Best in National Costume | Best in Evening Gown | Miss Photogenic | Best in Talent | Miss Congeniality | Miss Perfect Skin | Best Social Influencer / Miss Popular Vote | Best in Swimsuit |
|---|---|---|---|---|---|---|---|---|
| 2026 | Japan; Saki Iwai | Venezuela; Danielal Marquina | Thailand; Theerachaya Pimkitidaj | United States; Lo Colby | Honduras; Sofia Valencia | Laos; Lisa Saengdala | United States; Lo Colby | - |
| 2025 | United States; Midori Monét | Ecuador; Reyna Morocho | Thailand; Preeyakorn Pohnprom | Laos; Taneung Chanthasenesack | Cuba; Olivia Lauren | Laos; Taneung Chanthasenesack | Philippines; Anne Patricia Lorenzo Diaz | - |
| 2024 | Vietnam; Nguyễn Tường San | Thailand; Saruda Panyakham | Vietnam; Nguyễn Tường San | United States; Kataluna Enriquez | Thailand; Saruda Panyakham | Vietnam; Nguyễn Tường San | United States; Kataluna Enriquez Vietnam; Nguyễn Tường San | - |
| 2023 | Vietnam; Nguyễn Hà Dịu Thảo | United States; Melony Munro | China; Mika | Thailand; Arissara Kankla | Puerto Rico; Tianna Lee Rivera | - | Vietnam; Nguyễn Hà Dịu Thảo | - |
| 2022 | Japan; Yushin | Thailand; Kwanlada Rungrojampa | Cambodia; Sai Fhon | Vietnam; Phùng Trương Trân Đài | Laos; Minladar Engmany | - | India; Namitha Marimuthu | - |
| 2020 | Malaysia; Wanie Mohtar | Mexico; Valentina Fluchaire | Philippines; Jess Labares | France; Louiz | Indonesia; Gebby Vesta | - | Vietnam; Bùi Đình Hoài Sa | - |
| 2019 | Nicaragua; Tiffany Colleman | Brazil; Rafaela Manfrini | Thailand; Kanwara Kaewjin | United States; Jazell Barbie Royale | China; Yaya | - | Vietnam; Do Nhat Ha | - |
| 2018 | Indonesia; Dinda Syarif | Venezuela; Michel Epalza Betancourt | Brazil; Isabelle Coimbra | Vietnam; Nguyen Huong Giang | Honduras; Amelia Vega | - | Vietnam; Nguyen Huong Giang | - |
| 2016 | Laos; Wanmai Thammavong | Brazil; Lavine Holanda | Philippines; Stacy Biano | Italy; Roberta Marten | Malaysia; Star Kong | - | Mexico; Giselle Valero | - |
| 2015 | Australia; Sofiya Iya | Italy; Nicole Fontanell | Japan; Satsuki | Australia; Taliah | Peru; Dayana Valenzuela | - | Philippines; Francine Garcia Thailand; Sopida Siriwattananukoon | - |
| 2014 | Thailand; Nitsa Katrahong | Venezuela; Isabella Santiago | Thailand; Nitsa Katrahong | United States; Samira Sitara | Cuba; Yuni Carey | - | Laos; Piyada Inthavong | - |
| 2013 | South Korea; Arisa South | Brazil; Marcela Ohio | Thailand; Nethnapada Kanrayanon | Malaysia; Nur Sajat | Spain; Carolina Medina | Japan; Seri Fujinomiya | Singapore; Anne Patricia Lee | Venezuela; Nohemi Montilla |
| 2012 | Japan; Yuki Tachibana | United States; Sunny Dee Lite | Philippines; Kevin Balot | Japan; Tukishima Beni | Venezuela; Noa Herrera | Guam; Matrica Mae Centino | Philippines; Stefania Cruz | Philippines; Miriam Jimenez |
| 2011 | Brazil; Yasmin Dream | Japan; Karin Fujikawa | Cuba; Yuni Carey | China; Lucky | United States; Mokha Montrese | Thailand; Sirapassorn Atthayakorn | Philippines; Marianne Arguelles | Lebanon; Margaret Keyan |
| 2010 | South Korea; Mini | Thailand; Nalada Thamthanakorn | Japan; Ami Takeuchi | Colombia; Melania | France; Stella Rocha | Sweden; Alexandra | Belgium; Barbie Gauthier | - |
| 2009 | Thailand; Kangsadal Wongdusadeekul | United States; Sunny Dee-Lite | Thailand; Kangsadal Wongdusadeekul | Japan; Ai Haruna | Philippines; Godiva Marie Arcachie | - | Philippines; Anna Marie | - |
| 2007 | Japan; Beni Tsukishima | Philippines; Chanel Madrigal | Colombia; Melania Armenta | Venezuela; Gresia Rivas | Germany; Ireen Sue | - | Philippines; Rain Marie Madrigal | - |
| 2006 | South Korea; Maria | Malaysia; Phylliscia Hsuan | Philippines; Armela Esguera | United States; Domanigue Shappelle | Philippines; Shaina Marie Barber | - | Philippines; Alexis Marinas Jaromillo | - |
| 2005 | South Korea; Yu Ri | United States; Mimi Marks | Philippines; Mary Jane Castro | United States; Tiffany Ross | Indonesia; Olivia Lauren | - | - | - |
| 2004 | South Korea; Choi | India; Arisha Rani | Taiwan; Angela | - | Germany; Ireen Sue | - | - | Thailand; Treechada Petcharat |

== List of contestants ==
Color keys
A Declared as the winner
Ended as a first runner-up
Ended as a second runner-up
Ended as a top 6 finalists
Ended as a top 12 semi-finalists
Did not participate
Withdrew from competition

=== 2019–present ===
2019 – present
| Country | 2026 | 2025 | 2024 | 2023 | 2022 | 2021 | 2020 | 2019 |
|---|---|---|---|---|---|---|---|---|
| Australia | | | | | | NO PAGEANT HELD | Jan Brielle | |
| Bolivia | | | Catalina Ortega | | | NO PAGEANT HELD | | |
| Brazil | Angel Gadelha | Isabella Pamplona | Jessy Lira | Isabella Santorinne | Eloá Rodrigues | NO PAGEANT HELD | Ariella Moura | Rafaela Manfrini |
| Cambodia | | Hani Irina | Maiya | Van Be | Sai Fhon | NO PAGEANT HELD | | |
| Canada | Averii | Grezia Fox | Adriana Fernandez | Adrian Reyes | Patricia Jane Bustillo | NO PAGEANT HELD | | Julie Vu |
| Chile | | Regina Gerbier | | | | NO PAGEANT HELD | | |
| China | | Whisper Lyu | Asuka Rina | Mika | | NO PAGEANT HELD | Lacey Wang Xinlei | Yaya |
| Colombia | Catalina Vallejo | Valeria Palacio | Juliana Rivera Gutiérrez | Ange La Furcia | Jassmine Jimenez | NO PAGEANT HELD | | |
| Costa Rica | Alejandra Vargas | | | | | NO PAGEANT HELD | | |
| Cuba | Naomi Alon | Olivia Lauren | | | | NO PAGEANT HELD | | |
| Czech Republic | | Martina Sobková | | | | NO PAGEANT HELD | | |
| Ecuador | Anahi Festerling | Reyna Morocho | Kenia Bonilla | Anahi Ferterling | Mirka Alejandra Borja | NO PAGEANT HELD | | Mia Isabella Maquilón |
| El Salvador | | | Tatiana Molina | | | NO PAGEANT HELD | | |
| France | Ines Mess | | | | Aëla Chanel | NO PAGEANT HELD | Louiz Avendei | |
| Honduras | Sofia Valencia | Sofia Valencia | | | Luciana Romero | NO PAGEANT HELD | | |
| India | | | Arshi Ghosh | | Namitha Marimuthu | NO PAGEANT HELD | Nithush Alimaishani Ghashiksa | Veena Sandre |
| Indonesia | Keydi Bee | Kaycia Lee | Olivia Summer | Millen Cyrus | Kazzia Doll | NO PAGEANT HELD | Gebby Vesta | Indah Cheryl |
| Japan | Saki Iwai | Mina Amamatsu | Rin Tsuchiya | Tomo | Yushin | NO PAGEANT HELD | Rio Takahashi | Van |
| Laos | Lisa Saengdala | Taneung Chanthasenesack | Napatsarakarn Samatmanivong | Kanrayany Sisouphanh | Minladar Engmany | NO PAGEANT HELD | Aliya Sirisopha | Kanrayany Phothimath |
| Malaysia | Shazzyra Zahry | Khleo Ambrose | Eva Foster | Zieyra Alisya | Papai Cici | NO PAGEANT HELD | Wanie Mohtar | Larra Jassinta |
| Mexico | Khloe Rios-Wyatt | Alanna Cordero | Romina Amador Muñiz | Ivanna Cazares | Alejandra Morales | NO PAGEANT HELD | Valentina Fluchaire | Grecia Culpo |
| Mongolia | | | | | | NO PAGEANT HELD | Uyanga Hokyatwoklem | |
| Myanmar | Adlar Z | MJ Pan Aung | Monica | | | NO PAGEANT HELD | May Than Yo † | Nann Mway Hnin |
| Netherlands | | | | Solange Dekker | | NO PAGEANT HELD | | |
| New Zealand | Fee Frans | | | | | NO PAGEANT HELD | | |
| Nicaragua | Amaya Rivera | Tiffany Colleman | | Brenda López | | NO PAGEANT HELD | | Tiffany Colleman |
| Norway | | | | | | NO PAGEANT HELD | Eirin Grinde Tunheim | |
| Paraguay | | | | | Fabu Olmedo | NO PAGEANT HELD | | |
| Peru | Dayalid Coronado | Lesly Quispe | Catalina Marsano | Luna Reátegui | Javiera Arnillas | NO PAGEANT HELD | Nataly Saavedra | Adriana Jya |
| Philippines | Red Spiegelman | Anne Patricia Lorenzo | Sophia Nicole Arkanghel | Lars Pacheco | Fuschia Anne Ravena | NO PAGEANT HELD | Jess Labares | Nicole Guevarra Flores |
| Puerto Rico | Vicky Morales | Leeann Nicole Seda | Daniela Victoria | Tianna Lee Rivera | Catalina La Bella | NO PAGEANT HELD | | |
| Singapore | Antasha Zahra Ulhaq | | | Qatrisha Zairyah Kamsir | | NO PAGEANT HELD | Andrea Razali | |
| South Korea | | | | | Jin | NO PAGEANT HELD | | Ssehi |
| Spain | Nikole Ramirez | | | Victoria Fernandes | | NO PAGEANT HELD | | |
| Sweden | | | | | | NO PAGEANT HELD | Victoria Tran | |
| Taiwan | Ying Fei Wang | Tiffany Queen | Ella | | Allie Liao | NO PAGEANT HELD | Loey Wang | |
| Thailand | Theerachaya "Book" Pimkitidaj | Preeyakorn Pohnprom | Saruda Panyakham | Arissara Kankla | Kwanlada Rungrojampa | NO PAGEANT HELD | Ruethaipreeya Nuanglee | Kanwara Kaewjin |
| Turkey | Naz Duru | Elif Nilay | | | | NO PAGEANT HELD | | |
| United States | Lo Colby | Midori Monét | Kataluna Enriquez | Melony Munro | Catalina Cabella | NO PAGEANT HELD | Kayley Whalen | Jazell Barbie Royale |
| Venezuela | Danielal Marquina | Ashlyn Pia | Shana Zabala | Miranda Monasterios | Sofia Salomón | NO PAGEANT HELD | | Sofia Colmenarez |
| Vietnam | Nguyễn Cao Minh Anh | Hà Tâm Như | Nguyễn Tường San | Nguyễn Hà Dịu Thảo | Phùng Trương Trân Đài | NO PAGEANT HELD | Bùi Đình Hoài Sa | Do Nhat Ha |
| Total | 27 | 23 | 23 | 22 | 23 | NO PAGEANT HELD | 22 | 20 |

=== 2010–2018 ===
2010–2018
| Country | 2018 | 2017 | 2016 | 2015 | 2014 | 2013 | 2012 | 2011 | 2010 |
|---|---|---|---|---|---|---|---|---|---|
| Angola | | NO PAGEANT HELD | | | | | Imanni De Silva | | |
| Argentina | Sofia Solohaga | NO PAGEANT HELD | | | | | | | |
| Australia | Jacqueline Angliss Gillies | NO PAGEANT HELD | | Taliah | | Sharleng Gonzalez | | | |
| Australia | Jacqueline Angliss Gillies | NO PAGEANT HELD | | Sofiya Iya | | Victoria Martin | | | |
| Belgium | | NO PAGEANT HELD | | Andrea Van Brugghe | | | | | Barbie Gauthier |
| Brazil | Izabele Coimbra | NO PAGEANT HELD | Nathalie De Oliveira | Valesca Dominik Ferraz | Rafaela Manfrini | Marcela Ohio | Jessika Simões | Yasmin Dream | Michelly X |
| Brazil | Izabele Coimbra | NO PAGEANT HELD | Lavine Holanda | Valesca Dominik Ferraz | Raika Ferraz | Roberta Holanda | Bianca Gold | Yasmin Dream | Michelly X |
| Brazil | Izabele Coimbra | NO PAGEANT HELD | Lavine Holanda | Valesca Dominik Ferraz | Mariah Fernanda | Veronica Haddad | Bianca Gold | Yasmin Dream | Michelly X |
| Cambodia | | NO PAGEANT HELD | Reelawadee | | | | | | |
| Canada | | NO PAGEANT HELD | | | | | | | Jenna Talackova |
| Chile | | NO PAGEANT HELD | | | Daniela Manyoma | | | Venessa Lopes | |
| China | Ellie Cheng | NO PAGEANT HELD | | | | | | Angel Gaga | |
| Colombia | Mia Gomez Brito | NO PAGEANT HELD | Amethyst Dela Espriella | | | | | Yania Turkiyo | Melania Armenta |
| Cuba | | NO PAGEANT HELD | | | Yuni Carey † | | | Yuni Carey † | |
| Ecuador | | NO PAGEANT HELD | | | | | | | Susi Villa |
| Egypt | | NO PAGEANT HELD | Laura Lawrence | | | | | | |
| France | Livia Nielsen | NO PAGEANT HELD | | Brittanie | | | | Estelle Roedrer | Stella Rocha |
| France | Livia Nielsen | NO PAGEANT HELD | | Brittanie | | | | Herika Borges | Stella Rocha |
| French Polynesia | | NO PAGEANT HELD | | | | | Feleu Myroina | | |
| Germany | | NO PAGEANT HELD | Naomi Yamaji | | | Renata Ferreira | | Alessandra Vargas | |
| Guam | | NO PAGEANT HELD | | | | | Matrica Mae Centino | | |
| Honduras | Amelia Vega | NO PAGEANT HELD | | | | | | | |
| India | Nitasha Biswas | NO PAGEANT HELD | Bishesh Huirem | | | Angela | | Malaika Desingh | |
| Indonesia | Dinda Syarif | NO PAGEANT HELD | Lily Bakrie | | | Angeline Hanum | Dewi Fortuna | | |
| Indonesia | Dinda Syarif | NO PAGEANT HELD | Lily Bakrie | | | Angeline Hanum | Leha Angel Lelga | | |
| Israel | Elian Nesiel | NO PAGEANT HELD | | | | | | | |
| Italy | Marianna Melo | NO PAGEANT HELD | Roberta Marten | Nicole Fontanelli | | | | Marry De Francy | |
| Japan | Yuko | NO PAGEANT HELD | Maika Kunisaki | Riyo Mizuno | Annabel Yu | Satsuki Nishihara | Tukishima Beni | Karin Fujikawa | Ami Takeuchi |
| Japan | Yuko | NO PAGEANT HELD | Yuma Suzuki | Satsuki | Lilia Kisaragi | Seri Fujinomiya | Yuki Tachibana | Karin Fujikawa | Shima Shyna |
| Japan | Yuko | NO PAGEANT HELD | Yuma Suzuki | Sora Sakuragi | Lilia Kisaragi | Annabel Yu | Yuki Tachibana | Karin Fujikawa | Shima Shyna |
| South Korea | | NO PAGEANT HELD | | | Ribbon Park | Arisa Kim | | | Mini Han |
| Laos | Longsy Sinakhone | NO PAGEANT HELD | Wanmai Thammavong | Ninlamon Phimpha | Piyada Inthavong | | | | |
| Laos | Longsy Sinakhone | NO PAGEANT HELD | Savannakhet | Inleusa Semkam | Piyada Inthavong | | | | |
| Lebanon | | NO PAGEANT HELD | | | | | | Margaret Keyan | |
| Malaysia | Suki Low | NO PAGEANT HELD | Shazzyra Zahry | Catherina Chandran | Cicie Sinclair | Nur Sajat Fariz | | | |
| Malaysia | Suki Low | NO PAGEANT HELD | Star Kong | Nur Hendra Ikram | Cicie Sinclair | Patricia Asyeera Wong | | | |
| Mauritius | | NO PAGEANT HELD | | Anthea Diane | | | | | |
| Mexico | Anahi Cristobal Altuzar | NO PAGEANT HELD | Giselle Valero | Miranda Lombardo | | | | | |
| Mongolia | Solongo | NO PAGEANT HELD | Amina | | Solongo | | | | |
| Myanmar | Juana Paing | NO PAGEANT HELD | Lavine Holanda | Nan Htet Htet Moon | Myo Ko Ko San | Tanya Maung | | | |
| Myanmar | Juana Paing | NO PAGEANT HELD | Shaung Than Zin | Nan Htet Htet Moon | Myo Ko Ko San | Tanya Maung | | | |
| Nepal | Swastika Lama | NO PAGEANT HELD | Aniee Lama | | | | | | Meghna Lama |
| Nicaragua | Barbie D'Ebano | NO PAGEANT HELD | | | Ithzelle Berdrinadxy | | Berdien Lavyeska Diedrish Blandino | | |
| Nigeria | | NO PAGEANT HELD | | | | | | Sahhara Henson | |
| Peru | Ghina Chacon | NO PAGEANT HELD | Kayra | Dayana Valenzuela | | | | | |
| Philippines | Carla Marie Madrigal | NO PAGEANT HELD | Sabel Gonzales | Trixie Maristela | Kim Marie Villagalano | Kristina Cassandra Ybarra | Kevin Balot | Hazel Andrada | Bembem Radaza |
| Philippines | Carla Marie Madrigal | NO PAGEANT HELD | Sabel Gonzales | Francine Garcia | Kim Marie Villagalano | Andrea Justine Aliman | Michelle Montecarlo | Marianne Arguelles | Chelsea Marie |
| Philippines | Carla Marie Madrigal | NO PAGEANT HELD | Stacy Biano | Francine Garcia | Maria Venus Gomez | Andrea Justine Aliman | Miriam Jimenez | Marianne Arguelles | Claire Harlow |
| Philippines | Carla Marie Madrigal | NO PAGEANT HELD | Stacy Biano | Michelle Binas | Maria Venus Gomez | Godiva Marie Archachia | Stefania Cruz | Michelle Binas | Miranda Diana Kerr |
| Philippines | Carla Marie Madrigal | NO PAGEANT HELD | Stacy Biano | Michelle Binas | Maria Venus Gomez | Godiva Marie Archachia | Stefania Cruz | Michelle Binas | Nixie Salonga |
| Romania | | NO PAGEANT HELD | | | | | Tanja | | |
| Russia | | NO PAGEANT HELD | | | Veronika Svetlova | | Veronika Svetlova | Varvara Strange | |
| Singapore | | NO PAGEANT HELD | | Priyanka Raichanel | | Anne Patricia Lee | Marla Vera | | Cheryl Isabella |
| South Africa | | NO PAGEANT HELD | | | | Anastasia Jemiskavegus | | | |
| Spain | | NO PAGEANT HELD | Mishella | | Cristini Couto | Carolina Medina | Nikki Normanson Mascenon | | |
| Sri Lanka | Noel Tokuhisa | NO PAGEANT HELD | | | | | | Chamila | Chamila |
| Sweden | | NO PAGEANT HELD | | | | | | | Alexandra Bryngelsson |
| Thailand | Rinrada Thurapan | NO PAGEANT HELD | Jiratchaya Sirimong-konnawin | Sophida Siriwat-tananukoon | Nitsa Kedrahong | Netnapha Kanlayanon | Pronvilai Mongkol | Siraphatsron Atayakron | Nonlada Tumthanakron |
| Turkey | Nez Sayginer | NO PAGEANT HELD | | Basak Buldaq | Yanki Bayramoglu | | Deniz Tukylu | | |
| Turkey | Nez Sayginer | NO PAGEANT HELD | | Zuzi Narin | Yanki Bayramoglu | | Deniz Tukylu | | |
| United Kingdom | Francesca Camicia | NO PAGEANT HELD | | | | | | | |
| United States | Kataluna Enriquez | NO PAGEANT HELD | Camille Anderson | Adriana Mallea | Samira Sitara | Shantell I'm D'Marco | Sunny Dee Lite | Mokha Montrese | Stasha Sanchez |
| United States | Kataluna Enriquez | NO PAGEANT HELD | Camille Anderson | Adriana Mallea | Samira Sitara | Shantell I'm D'Marco | Mokha Montrese | Silkie O'Hara Munro | Sunny Dee Lite |
| United States | Kataluna Enriquez | NO PAGEANT HELD | Camille Anderson | Adriana Mallea | Samira Sitara | Shantell I'm D'Marco | Ruby Bella Cruz | Silkie O'Hara Munro | Sunny Dee Lite |
| Venezuela | Michel Epalza Betancourt | NO PAGEANT HELD | Andrea Collazo | | Isabella Santiago | Chanel Lopèz | Noa Herrera | Noa Herrera | |
| Venezuela | Michel Epalza Betancourt | NO PAGEANT HELD | Andrea Collazo | | Isabella Santiago | Nohemi Montillai | Noa Herrera | Chanel Lopèz | |
| Vietnam | Nguyễn Hương Giang | NO PAGEANT HELD | Bella | | Angelina May Nguyen | | | | |
| Total | 28 | NO PAGEANT HELD | 29 | 26 | 22 | 25 | 25 | 23 | 21 |

=== 2004–2009 ===
2004–2009
| Country | 2009 | 2008 | 2007 | 2006 | 2005 | 2004 |
|---|---|---|---|---|---|---|
| Australia | | NO PAGEANT HELD | | Kathryn Cole | | |
| Brazil | Daniela Marques | NO PAGEANT HELD | Aleika Barros | | Andressa Piovani | |
| China | Maggie Gao | NO PAGEANT HELD | | | | |
| Colombia | | NO PAGEANT HELD | Melania Armenta | Diana Mascaros | | |
| Costa Rica | | NO PAGEANT HELD | Ruby Bella Cruz | | | |
| Egypt | | NO PAGEANT HELD | | Darlene Illyana | | |
| France | | NO PAGEANT HELD | | | | Sylvie Iynn |
| Germany | | NO PAGEANT HELD | Irene Sue | | Irene Sue | Irene Sue |
| Hong Kong | | NO PAGEANT HELD | | | | Yan |
| India | | NO PAGEANT HELD | | | | Arisha Rani |
| Indonesia | | NO PAGEANT HELD | | Sylvia | Olivia Lauren | Chenny Han |
| Indonesia | | NO PAGEANT HELD | | Sylvia | Olivia Lauren | Megie |
| Indonesia | | NO PAGEANT HELD | | Sylvia | Olivia Lauren | Vena |
| Italy | | NO PAGEANT HELD | Patricia Binotto | Alessandra Da Costa | | |
| Japan | Ai Haruna | NO PAGEANT HELD | Ai Haruna | Baby Christina Andaya | Kanon Maruyama | Tomo |
| Japan | Bemi Tukishima | NO PAGEANT HELD | Beni Tukishima | Baby Christina Andaya | Kanon Maruyama | Fujiko Sakaki |
| Japan | Yuki Saejima | NO PAGEANT HELD | Shining Shyna | Hikaru Asakawa | Tsukasa Yamazaki | Miki Yoshikawa |
| Japan | Yuki Saejima | NO PAGEANT HELD | Shining Shyna | Hikaru Asakawa | Tsukasa Yamazaki | Tsukusa Yamazaki |
| South Korea | | NO PAGEANT HELD | | Maria | Yu Ri | Choi |
| South Korea | | NO PAGEANT HELD | | Maria | Yu Ri | Eun Kyung |
| Laos | | NO PAGEANT HELD | | | Chantha Petchsrikwa | Sendgao |
| Malaysia | Roxaanne Fonseka | NO PAGEANT HELD | Natasha Lim | Phylliscia Hsuan | Ally Arena Tech | Natasha Aziz |
| Malaysia | Roxaanne Fonseka | NO PAGEANT HELD | Natasha Lim | Shasha Emmanuel | Ally Arena Tech | Natasha Aziz |
| Mexico | | NO PAGEANT HELD | Sofia Montana | Erica Andrews | | |
| Nepal | Sandhya Lama | NO PAGEANT HELD | Akanchya Moktan | | | |
| Nepal | Sandhya Lama | NO PAGEANT HELD | Anjali Lama | | | |
| Nepal | Sandhya Lama | NO PAGEANT HELD | Bhumika Shrestha | | | |
| Philippines | Anna Marie Gauten | NO PAGEANT HELD | Chanel Madrigal | Patricia Montecarlo | Donita Gauten | Ma Cristina Dandan |
| Philippines | Anna Marie Gauten | NO PAGEANT HELD | Rain Marie Madrigal | Armela Esguera | Mika Lee Adriana | Ma Cristina Dandan |
| Philippines | Godiva Marie Arcachie | NO PAGEANT HELD | Francine Garcia | Joyce | Sean Pacifico | Apple Pie Mendoza |
| Philippines | Godiva Marie Arcachie | NO PAGEANT HELD | Francine Garcia | Katrina Ileth Halili | Sean Pacifico | Apple Pie Mendoza |
| Philippines | Jamby Lim Garcia | NO PAGEANT HELD | Joanna Castillanes | Alexis Marinas Jaromillo | Mary Jane Castro | Apple Pie Mendoza |
| Philippines | Jamby Lim Garcia | NO PAGEANT HELD | Joanna Castillanes | Donita Crown Linapacan | Mary Jane Castro | Michelle |
| Philippines | Maria Selita Erica Fideroa | NO PAGEANT HELD | Perla Quigaman | Kristina Madrigal | Sara Gomiz Trono | Michelle |
| Philippines | Maria Selita Erica Fideroa | NO PAGEANT HELD | Perla Quigaman | Shaina Maria Barber | Sara Gomiz Trono | Michelle |
| Puerto Rico | Naysha Lopez | NO PAGEANT HELD | Jazmine International | | | |
| Singapore | Camillia Dzelma | NO PAGEANT HELD | | | | Sonia Slizstar |
| Switzerland | | NO PAGEANT HELD | Bruna Gabral | | | |
| Switzerland | | NO PAGEANT HELD | Camila Pryns | | | |
| Taiwan | | NO PAGEANT HELD | | | | Angela |
| Taiwan | | NO PAGEANT HELD | | | | Cher |
| Thailand | Kangsadal Wongdu-sadeekul | NO PAGEANT HELD | Tanyarat Jirapatpakon | Ratravee Jiraprapakul | Tiptantree Rujiranon | Treechada Petcharat |
| Thailand | Sorrawee Nattee | NO PAGEANT HELD | Tanyarat Jirapatpakon | Ratravee Jiraprapakul | Tiptantree Rujiranon | Treechada Petcharat |
| United Kingdom | Asunta Mae | NO PAGEANT HELD | Melania Robles Lacson | Leah True | | |
| United States | Sunny De Lite | NO PAGEANT HELD | | Domanique Shappelle | Mimi Marks | |
| United States | Sunny De Lite | NO PAGEANT HELD | | Domanique Shappelle | Tiffany Ross | |
| United States | Stacey Jacobs | NO PAGEANT HELD | | Asia Vitale | Zsane' Braxton | |
| United States | Stacey Jacobs | NO PAGEANT HELD | | Asia Vitale | Victoria Rall | |
| Venezuela | | NO PAGEANT HELD | Gresia Rivas | | | |
| Total | 18 | NO PAGEANT HELD | 24 | 23 | 18 | 22 |

== List of Miss International Queen countries ==
| Country | Debut | Entrants | Years competed | National pageant | Placements | Best placement | First placed | Last placed |
|---|---|---|---|---|---|---|---|---|
| Angola | 2012 | 1 | 2012 | | 1 | Top 10: Imanni De Silva (2012) | 2012: Imanni De Silva (Top 10) | 2012: Imanni De Silva (Top 10) |
| Argentina | 2018 | 1 | 2018 | | 0 | | | |
| Australia | 2006 | 5 | 2006, 2013, 2015, 2018, 2020 | Miss Transsexual Australia | 2 | 1st Runner-up: Jacqueline Gillies (2018) | 2018: Jacqueline Gillies (1st Runner-up) | 2020: Jan Brielle (Top 6) |
| Belgium | 2015 | 2 | 2010, 2015 | | 0 | | | |
| Bolivia | 2024 | 1 | 2024 | | 0 | | | |
| Brazil | 2005 | 17 | 2005, 2007–present | Miss Beleza T Brasil | 15 | Winner: Marcela Ohio (2013) | 2005: Andressa (Top 10) | 2026: Angel Gadelha (Top 12) |
| Cambodia | 2016 | 4 | 2016, 2022–2024 | Miss Queen Cambodia | 1 | Top 12: Sai Fhon (2022) | 2022: Sai Fhon (Top 12) | 2022: Sai Fhon (Top 12) |
| Canada | 2010 | 5 | 2010, 2019, 2022–2024, 2026 | Miss International Queen Canada | 1 | Top 10: Jenna Talackova (2010) | 2010: Jenna Talackova (Top 10) | 2010: Jenna Talackova (Top 10) |
| Chile | 2011 | 3 | 2011, 2014, 2025 | | 1 | Top 10: Vanessa Lopes (2011) | 2011: Vanessa Lopes (Top 10) | 2011: Vanessa Lopes (Top 10) |
| China | 2009 | 8 | 2009, 2011, 2018–2020, 2023–2025 | | 3 | 2nd Runner-up: Yaya (2019) | 2019: Yaya (2nd Runner-up) | 2023: Mika (Top 11) |
| Colombia | 2006 | 9 | 2006–2007, 2010–2011, 2017–2018, 2022–present | Miss Internacional Queen Colombia | 4 | 1st Runner-Up: Jassmine Jímenez (2022) | 2010: Melania Armenta (Top 10) | 2026: Catalina Vallejo (Top 6) |
| Costa Rica | 2007 | 1 | 2007, 2026 | | 1 | Top 12: Alejandra Vargus (2026) | 2026: Alejandra Vargus (Top 12) | 2026: Alejandra Vargus (Top 12) |
| Cuba | 2011 | 3 | 2011, 2014, 2025–present | | 3 | 1st Runner-Up: Olivia Lauren (2025) | 2011: Yuni Carey (Top 10) | 2025: Olivia Lauren (1st Runner-up) |
| Czech Republic | 2025 | 1 | 2025 | | 0 | | | |
| Ecuador | 2010 | 7 | 2010, 2019–present | Miss Queen Ecuador | 1 | Top 6: Reyna Morocho (2025) | 2019: Mia Isabella Maquilón (Top 12) | 2025: Reyna Morocho (Top 6) |
| El Salvador | 2024 | 1 | 2024 | | 0 | | | |
| Egypt | 2006 | 2 | 2006, 2017 | | 0 | | | |
| France | 2004 | 7 | 2004, 2010–2011, 2015, 2018, 2020–2022, 2026 | Miss T France | 3 | 2nd Runner-Up: Aëla Chanel (2022) | 2010: Stella Rocha (Top 10) | 2026: Ines Mess (Top 6) |
| French Polynesia | 2012 | 1 | 2012 | | 0 | | | |
| Germany | 2004 | 5 | 2004–2005, 2007, 2011, 2017 | | 0 | | | |
| Guam | 2012 | 1 | 2012 | | 1 | Top 10: Matrica Mae Centino (2012) | 2012: Matrica Mae Centino (Top 10) | 2012: Matrica Mae Centino (Top 10) |
| Honduras | 2018 | 2 | 2018, 2022, 2026 | Miss Queen Internacional Honduras | 1 | Top 12: Amelia Vega (2018) | 2018: Amelia Vega (Top 12) | 2018: Amelia Vega (Top 12) |
| Hong Kong | 2004 | 1 | 2004 | | 0 | | | |
| India | 2004 | 9 | 2004, 2011, 2013, 2017–2022, 2024 | Miss Transqueen India | 2 | 1st Runner-up: Arisha Rani (2004) | 2004: Arisha Rani (1st Runner-up) | 2019: Veena Sandre (Top 12) |
| Indonesia | 2004 | 13 | 2004–2006, 2012–2013, 2017–present | Miss Queen Indonesia | 0 | | | |
| Israel | 2018 | 1 | 2018 | | 0 | | | |
| Italy | 2006 | 6 | 2006–2007, 2011, 2015, 2017–2018 | | 1 | Top 6: Marianna Melo (2018) | 2018: Marianna Melo (Top 6) | 2018: Marianna Melo (Top 6) |
| Japan | 2004 | 16 | 2004–present | Miss International Queen Japan | 14 | Winner: Ai Haruna (2009) | 2004: Tomo (Top 10) | 2026: Saki Iwai (2nd Runner-up) |
| South Korea | 2004 | 7 | 2004–2006, 2010, 2014, 2019, 2022 | Miss International Queen Korea | 5 | Winner: Mini Han (2010) | 2004: Eun Kyung (Top 10) | 2019: Ssehi (Top 12) |
| Laos | 2004 | 9 | 2004–2005, 2014, 2016–present | Miss Queen Laos | 8 | 2nd Runner-up: Piyada Inthavong (2014) | 2005: Chantha Petchsrikwa (Top 10) | 2026: Lisa Saengdala (Top 12) |
| Lebanon | 2011 | 1 | 2011 | | 1 | 2nd Runner-up: Margaret Keyan (2011) | 2011: Margaret Keyan (2nd Runner-up) | 2011: Margaret Keyan (2nd Runner-up) |
| Malaysia | 2004 | 15 | 2004–2009, 2013–present | Miss International Queen Malaysia | 9 | Top 6: Larra Jassinta (2019) | 2004: Natasha Aziz (Top 10) | 2026: Shazzyra Zahry (Top 12) |
| Mauritius | 2015 | 1 | 2015 | | 0 | | | |
| Mexico | 2006 | 13 | 2006–2007, 2015–present | Miss Trans México | 5 | Winner: Erica Andrews (2006); Valentina Fluchaire (2020) | 2006: Erica Andrews (Winner) | 2023: Ivanna Cázares (Top 6) |
| Mongolia | 2014 | 3 | 2014, 2018–2020 | | 1 | Top 12: Solongo (2018) | 2018: Solongo (Top 12) | 2018: Solongo (Top 12) |
| Myanmar | 2013 | 8 | 2013–2020, 2024–present | Miss International Queen Myanmar | 0 | | | |
| Nepal | 2007 | 6 | 2007–2010, 2017–2019 | Miss Pink Nepal | 0 | | | |
| Netherlands | 2023 | 1 | 2023 | Miss International Queen New Z | 1 | Winner: Solange Dekker (2023) | Winner: Solange Dekker (2023) | Winner: Solange Dekker (2023) |
| New Zealand | 2023 | 1 | 2026 | | 0 | | | |
| Nicaragua | 2012 | 6 | 2012, 2014, 2018–2019, 2023-present | Miss International Queen Nicaragua | 1 | Top 12: Tiffany Colleman (2025) | 2025: Tiffany Colleman (Top 12) | 2025: Tiffany Colleman (Top 12) |
| Nigeria | 2011 | 1 | 2011 | | 1 | 1st Runner-up: Sahhara Henson (2011) | 2011: Sahhara Henson (1st Runner-up) | 2011: Sahhara Henson (1st Runner-up) |
| Norway | 2020 | 1 | 2020 | | 1 | Top 12: Eirin Grinde Tunheim (2020) | 2020: Eirin Grinde Tunheim (Top 12) | 2020: Eirin Grinde Tunheim (Top 12) |
| Panama | 2019 | 1 | 2019 | | 0 | | | |
| Paraguay | 2022 | 1 | 2022 | Miss International Queen Paraguay | | | | |
| Peru | 2015 | 10 | 2015–present | Miss International Queen Peru | 2 | Winner: Catalina Marsano(2024) | 2019: Adriana Jya (Top 12) | 2024: Catalina Marsano(Winner) |
| Philippines | 2004 | 18 | 2004–present | Miss International Queen Philippines | 18 | Winner: Kevin Balot (2012); Trixie Maristela (2015); Fuschia Anne Ravena (2022) | 2004: Ma Cristina Dandan (2nd Runner-up); Michelle (Top 10); Apple Pie Mendoza (Top 10) | 2026: Red Spiegelman (Top 6) |
| Puerto Rico | 2007 | 6 | 2007–2009, 2022–present | Miss Puerto Rico International Queen | 1 | Top 10: Jazmine International (2007) | 2007: Jazmine International (Top 10) | 2007: Jazmine International (Top 10) |
| Romania | 2012 | 1 | 2012 | | 0 | | | |
| Russia | 2011 | 3 | 2011–2012, 2014 | | 0 | | | |
| Singapore | 2004 | 8 | 2004, 2009–2010, 2012–2013, 2015, 2020, 2023, 2026 | Miss International Queen Singapore | 2 | 1st Runner-up: Qatrisha Zairyah (2023) | 2004: Sonia Slizstar (Top 10) | 2023: Qatrisha Zairyah (1st Runner-up) |
| South Africa | 2013 | 1 | 2013 | | 1 | Top 10: Anastasia South (2013) | 2013: Anastasia South (Top 10) | 2013: Anastasia South (Top 10) |
| Spain | 2012 | 5 | 2012–2014, 2017, 2023, 2026 | | 2 | Top 10: Cristini Couto (2014) | 2014: Cristini Couto (Top 10) | 2023: Victoria Fernandes (Top 11) |
| Sri Lanka | 2010 | 3 | 2010–2011, 2018 | | 1 | Top 12: Noel Tokuhisa (2018) | 2018: Noel Tokuhisa (Top 12) | 2018: Noel Tokuhisa (Top 12) |
| Sweden | 2010 | 2 | 2010, 2020 | | 1 | Top 10: Anastasia Bryngelsson (2010) | 2010: Anastasia Bryngelsson (Top 10) | 2010: Anastasia Bryngelsson (Top 10) |
| Switzerland | 2007 | 1 | 2007 | | 1 | Top 10: Bruna Gabral (2007) | 2007: Bruna Gabral (Top 10) | 2007: Bruna Gabral (Top 10) |
| Taiwan | 2004 | 5 | 2004, 2020, 2022, 2024–present | Miss International Queen Taiwan | 1 | Top 12: Loey Wang (2020) | 2020: Loey Wang (Top 12) | 2020: Loey Wang (Top 12) |
| Thailand | 2004 | 20 | 2004–present | Miss Tiffany | 19 | Winner: Treechada Petcharat (2004); Tanyarat Jirapatpakon (2007); Sirapassorn Atthayakorn (2011); Jiratchaya Sirimongkolnawin (2017) | 2004: Treechada Petcharat (Winner) | 2026: Theerachaya Pimkitidaj (1st Runner-up) |
| Turkey | 2012 | 5 | 2012, 2014–2015, 2017, 2025–present | But Trans Güzellik Yarişmasi | 2 | Top 10: Basak Buldaq (2012); Yanki Bayramoglu (2014) | 2012: Basak Buldaq (Top 10) | 2014: Yanki Bayramoglu (Top 10) |
| United States | 2005 | 18 | 2005–2006, 2009–present | Miss International Queen USA | 13 | Winner: Mimi Marks (2005); Jazell Barbie Royale (2019); Midori Monét (2025); Lo Colby (2026) | 2005: Mimi Marks (Winner) | 2026: Lo Colby (Winner) |
| United Kingdom | 2006 | 3 | 2006–2009, 2018 | Miss TS International UK | 1 | Top 10: Asunta Mae (2009) | 2009: Asunta Mae (Top 10) | 2009: Asunta Mae (Top 10) |
| Venezuela | 2007 | 10 | 2007, 2011–2014, 2017–2019, 2022–present | Miss International Queen Venezuela | 8 | Winner: Isabella Santiago (2014) | 2011: Noa Herrera (Top 10) | 2026: Danielal Marquina (Top 12) |
| Vietnam | 2014 | 8 | 2014, 2016–present | Miss International Queen Vietnam | 8 | Winner: Jennifer Nguyễn Hương Giang (2018) | 2018: Jennifer Nguyễn Hương Giang (Winner) | 2026: Nguyễn Cao Minh Anh (Top 12) |

== Controversy ==
Eva Foster, a Malaysian participant in Miss International Queen 2024, voiced concerns about the pageant, accusing it of favoritism and unprofessionalism. She was disappointed about not reaching the top 12 despite her strong showing, especially in the evening gown segment. Foster also mentioned that other contestants, including those from Indonesia and India, shared her concerns that the competition was influenced by factors beyond merit. After the controversy sparked by her remarks at Miss International Queen (MIQ) 2024, Eva Foster took to social media to offer a sincere apology, particularly to the people of Thailand. In her apology, Foster expressed profound regret for any misunderstandings or offense her actions may have caused.
