= Miss Tiffany's Universe =

Thai transgender female beauty contest

Miss Tiffany
- มิสทิฟฟานี่ยูนิเวิร์ส
- Formation: 1998; 28 years ago
- Type: Beauty pageant
- Headquarters: Pattaya
- Location: Thailand
- Members: Miss International Queen
- Official language: Thai
- Website: www.misstiffanyuniverse.org
- Formerly called: Miss Tiffany's Universe (1998-2019)

Miss Tiffany's Universe (Thai: มิสทิฟฟานี่ยูนิเวิร์ส)—now known as Miss Tiffany—is a beauty pageant for Thai transgender women in Pattaya, Thailand, which has taken place annually since 1998. The winner represents Thailand at Miss International Queen pageant.

The reigning Miss Tiffany is Preeyakorn Pohnprom of Chonburi.

== Background ==
The contest is open to all transgender women who may or may not have gone through sex reassignment surgery, or who simply crossdress and/or live their lives as females. "Ladyboy" (or "kathoey"), while potentially considered a derogatory description or even a hateful slur in some parts of the world, is commonly used by both the LGBT+ community and others within Southeast Asia in reference to effeminate gay men who crossdress and drag entertainers, as well as transgender women. Each year, about 100 applicants from across Thailand submit their résumés and audition to take part in the pageant. All contestants need to have Thai nationality and be between the ages of 18 and 25. Contestants under the age of 20 are required to show proof of parental permission to participate. Contestants come from a variety of backgrounds, including university students, doctors, engineers, pharmacists, and more. Once chosen to participate in the pageant, the contestants are judged based on physical attributes and overall performance, in several categories, in accordance to the feminine ideal.

The Miss Tiffany's Universe winner receives a trophy and crown, a car (Honda Jazz), cash prize, jewelry and other gifts from sponsors. Besides the overall winner, other awards include Miss Photogenic, Miss Sexy Star, Miss Congeniality and Miss Popular Vote. Miss Tiffany's Universe is Thailand's official prerequisite pageant to Miss International Queen. Miss Tiffany's Universe pageant, held once per year, is receiving more attention than ever as it is now broadcast live on Thai television, averaging an audience of more than 15 million viewers.

Miss Tiffany's Universe is a registered trademark of Tiffany's Show Pattaya Co, Ltd. The organization supports charity events for the less fortunate and supports The Royal-sponsored AIDS Foundation. The ultimate goal of the contest is to promote trans and LGBT rights and equality and improve the overall quality of life for transgender persons, in Thailand. The pageant is also a source of significant income and opens up lucrative opportunities and sponsorships for pageant contestants.

== Miss Tiffany's Universe winners ==
Year	Editions	Miss Tiffany's Universe	Runner-up				Venue	Entrants
Year	Editions	Miss Tiffany's Universe	First	Second	Third	Fourth	Venue	Entrants
1998	1st	Thanakorn Wongprasert (Bangkok)	Yada Wilson	Yada Plodthrap	Chonlada Sirisopha	Chattarika Issaraphakdee	Tiffany's Show Theatre, Pattaya	42
1999	2nd	Phatreeya Siringamwong (Nakhon Si Thammarat)	Natthapon Phonphromthep	Khaimuk Klindokmai	Napharat Suksang	Duangthip Issaraphakdee	Tiffany's Show Theatre, Pattaya	50

Year	Editions	Miss Tiffany's Universe	Runner-up		Venue	Entrants
Year	Editions	Miss Tiffany's Universe	First	Second	Venue	Entrants
2000	3rd	Bangkok)	Nichanon Sudprasit	Tassaneewan Thanyasiri	Tiffany's Show Theatre, Pattaya	58
2001	4th	Bangkok)	Pronpanit Sitthiyotha	Pathompon Thanapat	Tiffany's Show Theatre, Pattaya	52
2002	5th	Thanyaporn Aunyasiri (Bangkok)	Panrung Charuwattananukul	Warinthon Worarattanasirikul	Tiffany's Show Theatre, Pattaya	59
2003	6th	Pantawan Jaruwatthananukul (Bangkok)	Thaksorn Sukcharoen	Latcha Panyasirin	Tiffany's Show Theatre, Pattaya	70
2004	7th	Treechada Petcharat (Phang Nga)	Kitthita Kitthiwattana	Aronong Chittanon	Tiffany's Show Theatre, Pattaya	30
2005	8th	Tiptantree Rujiranon (Singburi)	Peeranya Ruangrungroj	Kanpitcha Sirisakul	Tiffany's Show Theatre, Pattaya	32
2006	9th	Ratrawee Jirapraphakul (Lopburi})	Soponnanut Uthamkun	Apirada Treechanukul	Tiffany's Show Theatre, Pattaya	30
2007	10th	Thanyarat Jiraphatpakorn (Maha Sarakham)	Pharawee Chatpakorn	Pimchanok Hongsopa	Tiffany's Show Theatre, Pattaya	30
2008	11th	Kangsadal Wongdutsadeekul (Kanchanaburi)	Donkamol Khontham	Phailyn Denphanaphaphol	Tiffany's Show Theatre, Pattaya	30
2009	12th	Sorrawee Nattee (Songkhla)	Wirittorn Narapatpimol	Napatsawan Chonlakorn	Tiffany's Show Theatre, Pattaya	30
2010	13th	Nalada Thamthanakorn (Bangkok)	Chanya Denphanaphaphol	Nampetch Prasopchok	Tiffany's Show Theatre, Pattaya	30
2011	14th	Sirapassorn Atthayakorn (Chiang Mai)	Sarunrat Chaiyakorn	Thissanabodi Boon-niyom	Tiffany's Show Theatre, Pattaya	30
2012	15th	Panvilat Mongkol (Bangkok)	Nicha Chaiyaphuek	Siriworakarn Buttayothi	Tiffany's Show Theatre, Pattaya	30
2013	16th	Nethnapada Kanlayanon (Samut Prakan)	Chananchida Rungphetcharat	Sophida Rachanon	Tiffany's Show Theatre, Pattaya	30
2014	17th	Nissa Katrahong (Prachuap Khiri Khan)	Ratchaya Noppakarun	Treethipnipha Thippaphada	Tiffany's Show Theatre, Pattaya	30
2015	18th	Sophida Siriwattananukul (Nonthaburi)	Kanchaya Kanchanakul	Pimnara Athiphatdechakorn	Tiffany's Show Theatre, Pattaya	30
2016	19th	Jiratchaya Sirimongkolnawin (Bangkok)	Minlananin Saenthep	Rananda Watthanasiriwilaikul	Tiffany's Show Theatre, Pattaya	30
2017	20th	Rinrada Thurapan (Roi Et)	Kwanlada Rungrojampa	Phimphisa Phanupawinchok	Tiffany's Show Theatre, Pattaya	30
2018	21st	Kanwara Kaewchin (Prachuap Khiri Khan)	Theerachaya Phimkitidet	Worawarun Taweekarn	Tiffany's Show Theatre, Pattaya	30
2019	22nd	Ruethaipreeya Nuanglee (Khon Kaen)	Thanyada Kanphaiphuen	Patchara Sriphatthanakul	Tiffany's Show Theatre, Pattaya	32
2020	23rd	Kwanlada Rungrojampa (Nakhon Pathom)	Apatsara Muen-noi	Methawee Thongthaitae	Tiffany's Show Theatre, Pattaya	30
2022	24th	Arissara Kankla (Ubon Ratchathani)	Napichaya Pimpru	Earth Nattapat	Tiffany's Show Theatre, Pattaya	31
2024	25th	Saruda Panyakham (Tak)	Kachisara Sridakhot	Jesselyn Nakprasit	Tiffany's Show Theatre, Pattaya	31
2025	26th	Preeyakorn Pornprom (Chonburi)	Napitchaya Phimpru	Irada Techanurak	Tiffany's Show Theatre, Pattaya	34
2026	27th	Theerachaya Phimkitidet (Bangkok)	Chiang Mai)	Minthita Orndam (Suphanburi)	Tiffany's Show Theatre, Pattaya	24

=== Winners by province ===
Provinces	Titles	Winning years
Bangkok	9	1975, 1976, 1998, 2000, 2001, 2002, 2003, 2009*, 2010, 2012, 2016, 2026
Prachuap Khiri Khan	2	2014, 2018
Lopburi	2	2006, 2025
Tak	1	2024
Ubon Ratchathani	1	2022
Nakhon Pathom	1	2020
Khon Kaen	1	2019
Roi Et	1	2017
Nonthaburi	1	2015
Samut Prakan	1	2013
Chiang Mai	1	2011
Songkhla	1	2009
Kanchanaburi	1	2008
Maha Sarakham	1	2007
Singburi	1	2005
Phang Nga	1	2004
Nakhon Si Thammarat	1	1999

=== Winners by region ===
Regions	Titles	Best performance
Bangkok Metropolitan Region	14	Bangkok (12), Samut Prakan (1), Nonthaburi (1), Nakhon Pathom (1)
Western Region	4	Prachuap Khiri Khan (2), Kanchanaburi (1), Tak (1)
Northeastern Region	3	Maha Sarakham (1), Roi Et (1), Khon Kaen (1), Ubon Ratchathani (1)
Southern Region	3	Songkhla (1), Phang Nga (1), Nakhon Si Thammarat (1)
Central Region	2	Sing Buri (1), Lop Buri (1), Chonburi (1)
Northern Region	1	Chiang Mai (1)
Eastern Region	0	

== Miss International Queen ==
Color keys

- : Declared as winner
- : Ended as runner-up
- : Ended as one of the finalists or semi-finalists
- : Ended as special awards winner

Year	Representative's Name	Province	Title	Placement	Special Awards
2026	Theerachaya Phimkitidaj	Bangkok	Miss Tiffany 2026	1st Runner-up	1 Special Awards: Miss Photogenic
2025	Preeyakorn Pornprom	Chonburi	Miss Tiffany 2025	Top 12	1 Special Awards: Miss Photogenic
2024	Saruda Panyakham	Tak	Miss Tiffany 2024	1st Runner-up	
2023	Arissara Kankla	Ubon Ratchathani	Miss Tiffany 2022	Top 6	1 Special Awards: Best in Talent
2022	Kwanlada Rungrojampa	Nakhon Pathom	Miss Tiffany 2020	Top 6	2 Special Awards: Best in Evening Gown; 1st Runner-up - Best in Talent
2021 No Miss Tiffany contest, Due to the impact of COVID-19 pandemic in Thailand
2020	Ruethaipreeya Nuanglee	Khon Kaen	Miss Tiffany's Universe 2019	1st Runner-up	
2019	Kanwara Kaewchin	Prachuap Khiri Khan	Miss Tiffany's Universe 2018	1st Runner-up	1 Special Awards: Miss Photogenic
2018	Rinrada Thurapan	Roi Et	Miss Tiffany's Universe 2017	2nd Runner-up	
2016	Jiratchaya Sirimongkolnawin	Bangkok	Miss Tiffany's Universe 2016	Miss International Queen 2017	1 Special Awards: Miss Ripleys Popular World
2015	Sophida Siriwattananukul	Nonthaburi	Miss Tiffany's Universe 2015	2nd Runner-up	1 Special Awards: Miss Photogenic
2014	Nissa Katrahong	Prachuap Khiri Khan	Miss Tiffany's Universe 2014	1st Runner-up	2 Special Awards: Miss Photogenic; Best National Costume
2013	Nethnapada Kanrayanon	Samut Prakan	Miss Tiffany's Universe 2013	2nd Runner-up	1 Special Awards: Miss Photogenic
2012	Panvilat Mongkol	Bangkok	Miss Tiffany's Universe 2012	2nd Runner-up	
2011	Sirapasorn Atthayakorn	Chiang Mai	Miss Tiffany's Universe 2011	Miss International Queen 2011	1 Special Awards: Miss Perfect Skin By Asoke Skin Hospital
2010	Nalada Thamthanakorn	Bangkok	Miss Tiffany's Universe 2010	Top 10	
2009	Sorawee Nattee	Songkhla	Miss Tiffany's Universe 2009	Top 10	1 Special Awards: Best National Costume
2009	Kangsadal Wongdutsadeekul	Kanchanaburi	Miss Tiffany's Universe 2008	1st Runner-up	1 Special Awards: Miss Photogenic
2007	Thanyarat Jiraphatpakorn	Maha Sarakham	Miss Tiffany's Universe 2007	Miss International Queen 2007	
2006	Ratrawee Jirapraphakul	LopBuri	Miss Tiffany's Universe 2006	2nd Runner-up	
2005	Tiptantree Rujiranon	Sing Buri	Miss Tiffany's Universe 2005	2nd Runner-up	
2004	Treechada Petcharat	Phang Nga	Miss Tiffany's Universe 2004	Miss International Queen 2004	1 Special Awards: Best Swimwear

== Past franchises ==
=== Queen of the Universe ===
Color keys

- : Declared as Winner
- : Ended as runner-up or top 5/6 qualification
- : Ended as one of the finalists or semifinalists
- : Ended as special awards winner

Year	Representative's Name	Province	Title	Placement	Special Awards
2003	Pantawan Jaruwatthananukul	Bangkok	Miss Tiffany's Universe 2003	Non-Finalist	
2002	Thanyaporn Aunyasiri	Bangkok	Miss Tiffany's Universe 2002	Queen of the Universe 2002	1 Special Awards: Miss Congeniality
2001	Piyathida Sakulthai	Bangkok	Miss Tiffany's Universe 2001	Non-Finalist	
2000	Chanya Moranon	Bangkok	Miss Tiffany's Universe 2000	Queen of the Universe 2000	1 Special Awards: Best National Costume
1999	Phatreeya Siri-ngamwong	Nakhon Si Thammarat	Miss Tiffany's Universe 1999	Queen of the Universe 1999	1 Special Awards: Best Evening Gown
1998	Thanakorn Wongprasert	Bangkok	Miss Tiffany 1998	Non-Finalist	

== See also ==
- Miss Thailand
- Miss Teen Thailand
- Miss Thailand World
- Miss Universe Thailand
- Miss International Thailand
- Miss Earth Thailand
- Miss Grand Thailand
- Miss Supranational Thailand
- List of beauty pageants
