= List of The Amazing Race Vietnam contestants =

Contestants starring in The Amazing Race Vietnam

This is a list of contestants who have appeared on The Amazing Race Vietnam, a Vietnamese reality competition show based on the American series, The Amazing Race.

== Contestants ==
Contestant participated in The Amazing Race Vietnam for a second time.

=== The Amazing Race Vietnam 2012 ===
Contestants	Season	Ref
Contestants	1	
Baggio	1	
Thành Phúc	1	
Phương Thảo	1	
Minh Hoàng	1	
Thanh Bằng	1	
Thành Chung	1	
Chí Bình	1	
Hồng Long	1	
Xuân Sơn	1	
Tuấn Anh	1	
Minh Châu	1	
Trần Châu	1	
Gia Bình	1	
Bảo Châu	1	
Thanh Tuấn	1	
Mỹ Trâm	1	
Richie	1	
Mimi	1	
Thanh Thủy	1	
Minh Thoa	1	

=== The Amazing Race Vietnam 2013 ===
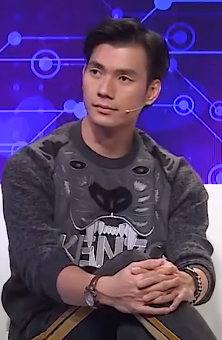
Nhan Phúc Vinh

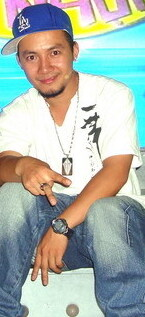
Đinh Tiến Đạt

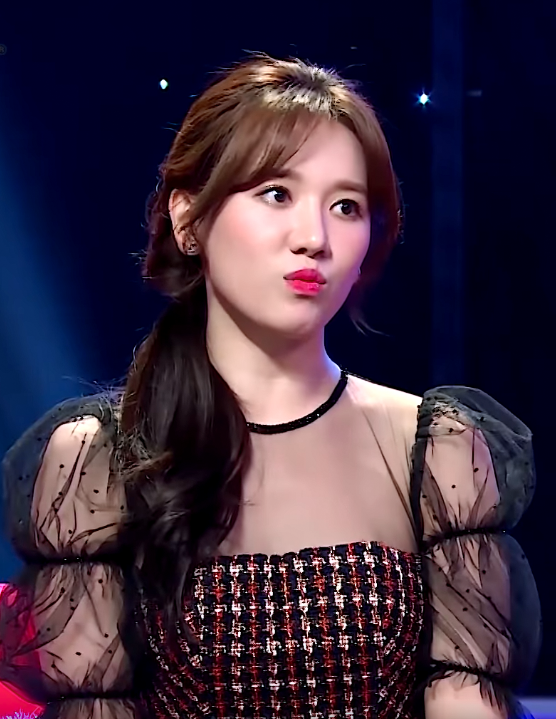
Hari Won

Contestants	Season	Ref
Contestants	2	
Trần Hiền	2	
Diệp Lâm Anh	2	
Linh Chi	2	
Nhan Phúc Vinh	2	
Thùy Dung	2	
Đức Hưng	2	
Đinh Tiến Đạt	2	
Hari Won	2	
Linh Sơn	2	
Đoàn Mạnh	2	
Thanh Hoa	2	
Anh Tuấn	2	
Pha Lê	2	
Hà Việt Dũng	2	
Kim Lee	2	
Pharreal Phương	2	
S.T Sơn Thạch	2	
Lâm Hùng Phong	2	

=== The Amazing Race Vietnam 2014 ===
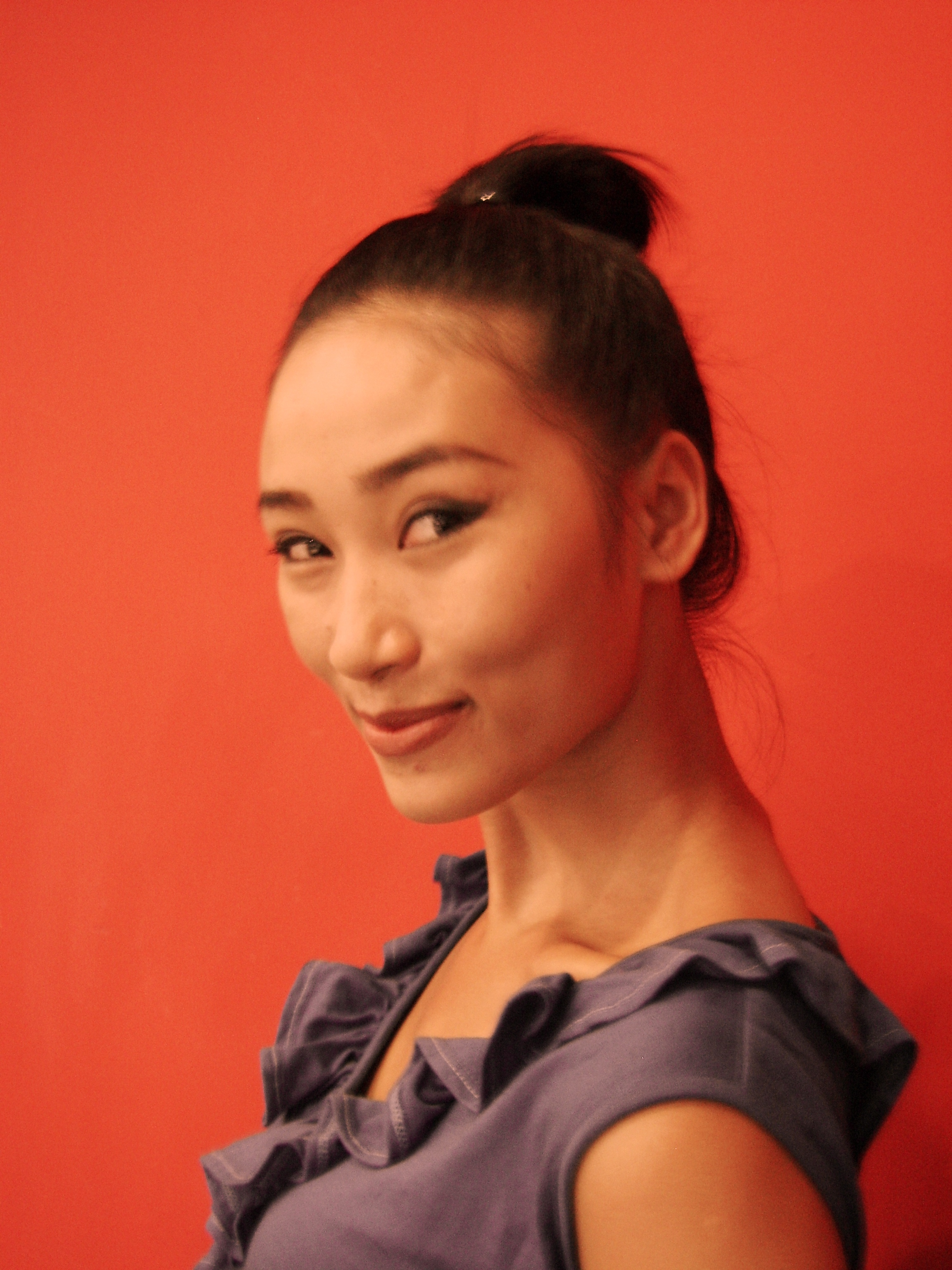
Trang Khiếu

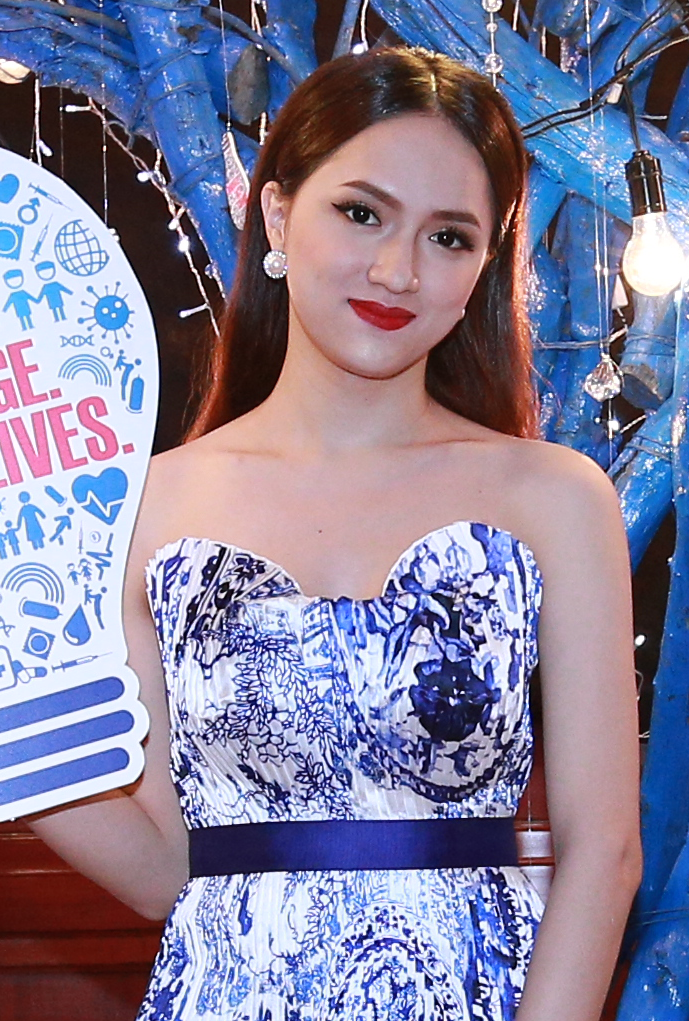
Hương Giang

Contestants	Season	Ref
Contestants	3	
Hương Giang	3	
Criss Lai	3	
Trang Trần	3	
Hiếu Nguyễn	3	
Trang Khiếu	3	
An Đinh	3	
Kiwi Ngô Mai Trang	3	
Đỗ Hoàng Dương	3	
Sơn Ngọc Minh	3	
Huê Mint (†)	3	
Long Điền	3	
Kim Dung	3	
Kim Thanh	3	
Khải Anh	3	
Miko Lan Trinh	3	
Hoàng Nam	3	
Minh Long	3	
Sơn Việt	3	

=== The Amazing Race Vietnam 2015 ===
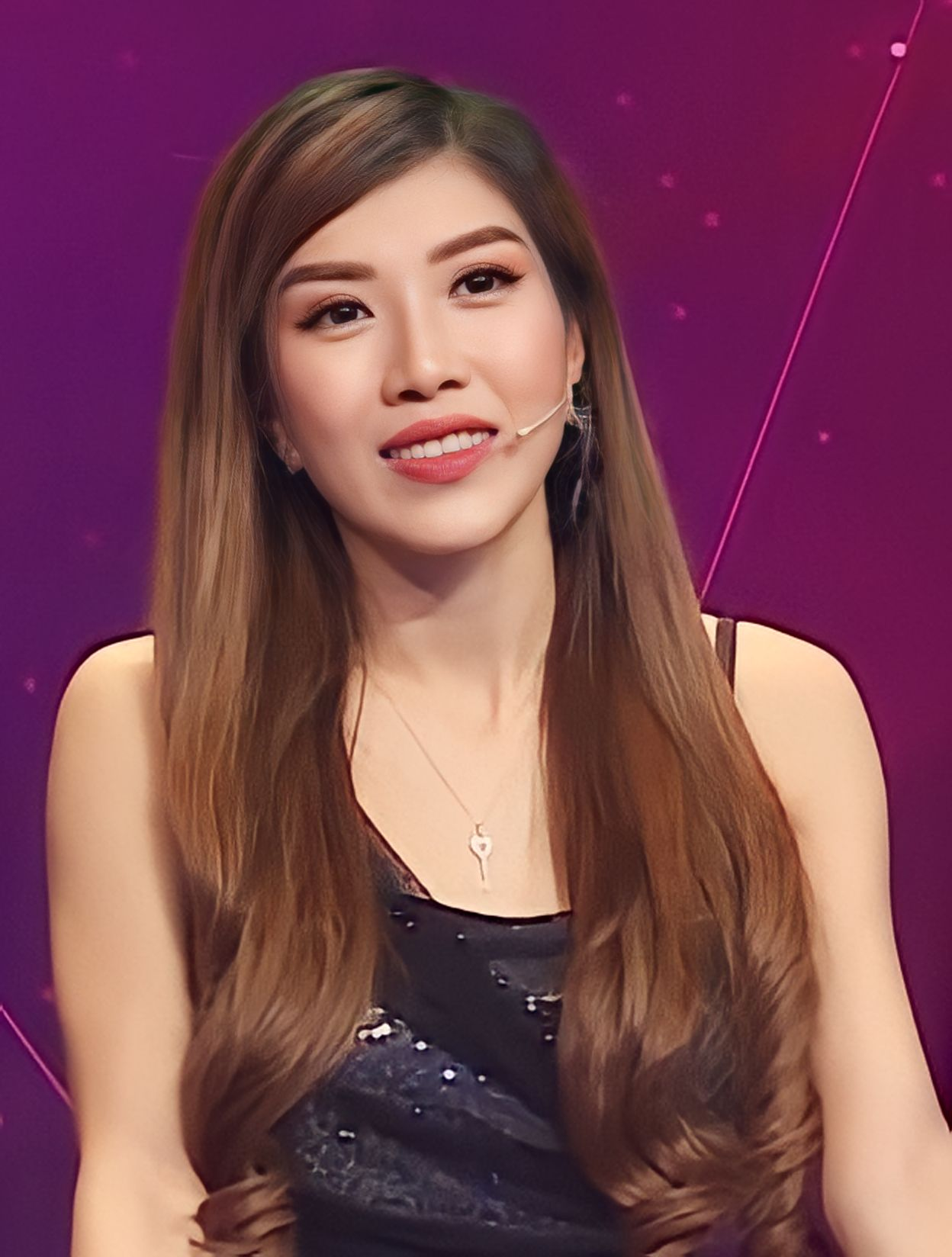
Trang Pháp

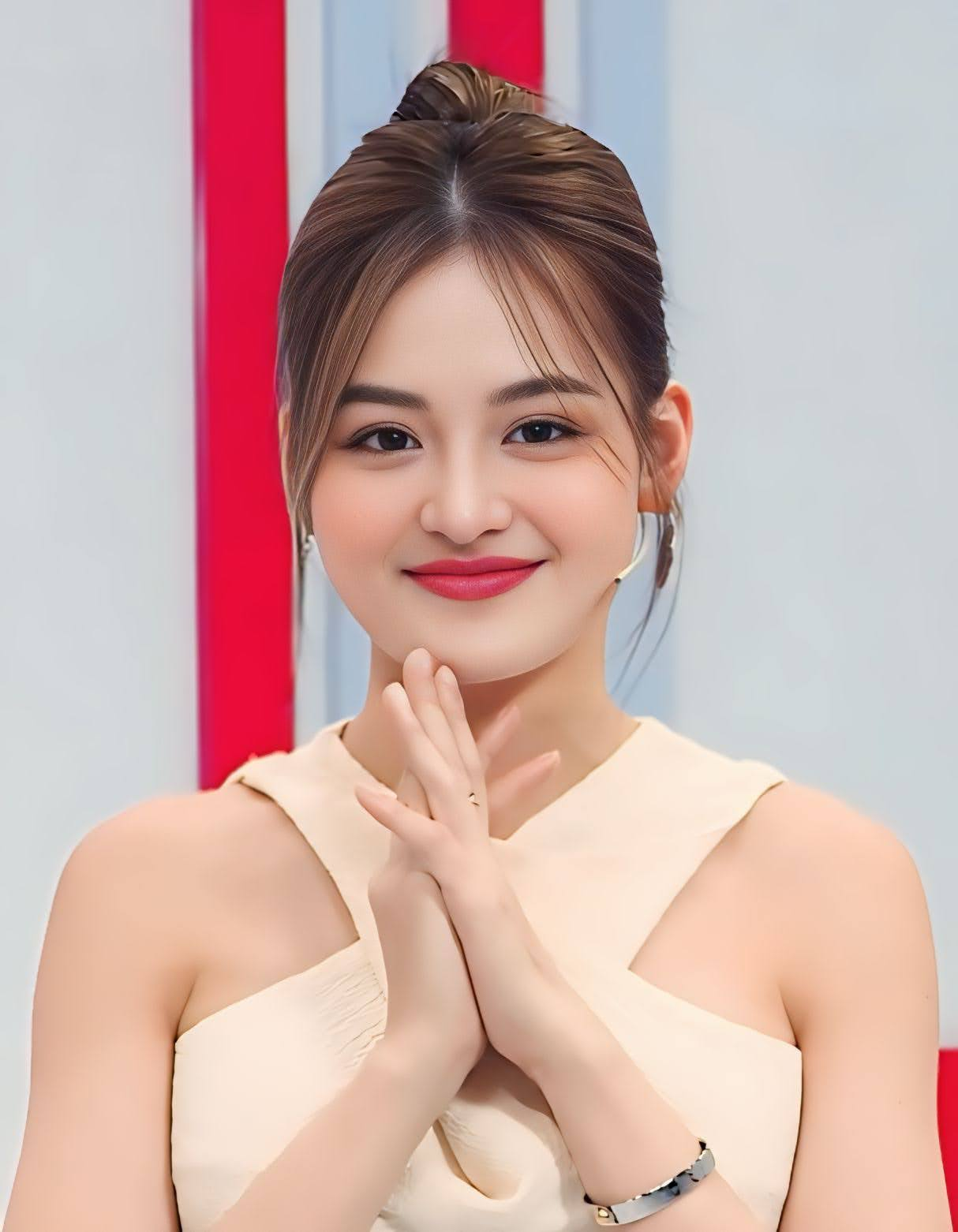
Thùy Anh

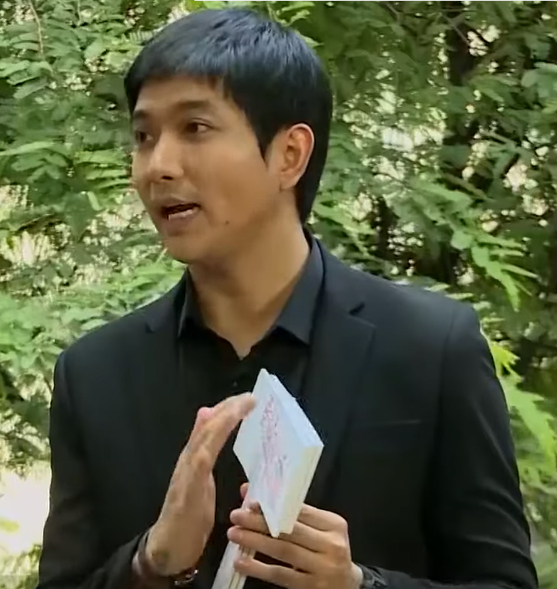
Tim

Contestants	Season	Ref
Ngọc Anh	4	
Nhật Anh	4	
Chí Thành	4	
Thúc Lĩnh Lincoln	4	
Băng Di	4	
Trang Pháp	4	
Đăng Hoàng	4	
Thùy Anh	4	
Trương Nam Thành	4	
Hải Băng	4	
Phương Ly	4	
Joo Young	4	
Song Ngư	4	
Trúc Như	4	
Tim	4	
Anh Đức	4	

=== The Amazing Race Vietnam 2016 ===
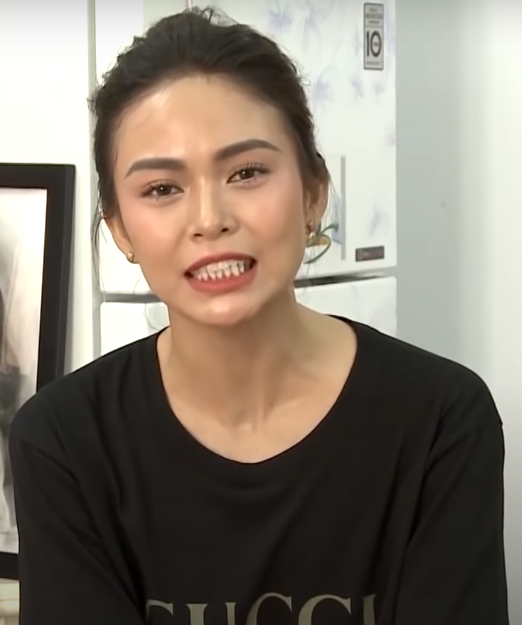
Mâu Thủy

Contestants	Season	Ref
Contestants	5	
Đinh Tiến Đạt	5	
Thúc Lĩnh Lincoln	5	
Hương Giang	5	
Criss Lai	5	
Nhan Phúc Vinh	5	
Thùy Dung	5	
Pha Lê	5	
Hà Việt Dũng	5	
Thanh Hoa	5	
Anh Tuấn	5	
Song Ngư	5	
Trúc Như	5	
Trần Hiền	5	
Minh Long	5	
Mimi	5	
Richie	5	
Sơn Ngọc Minh	5	
Mâu Thủy	5	
Thùy Anh	5	

=== The Amazing Race Vietnam 2019 ===
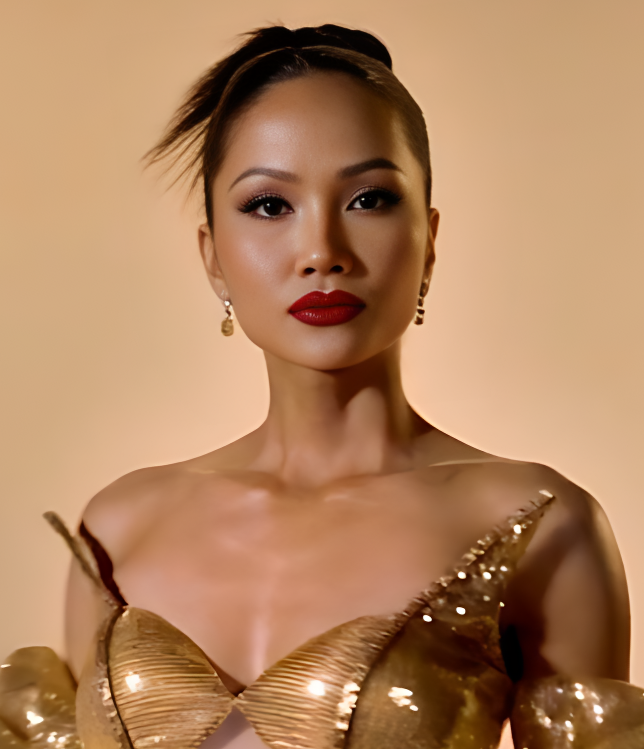
H'Hen Niê

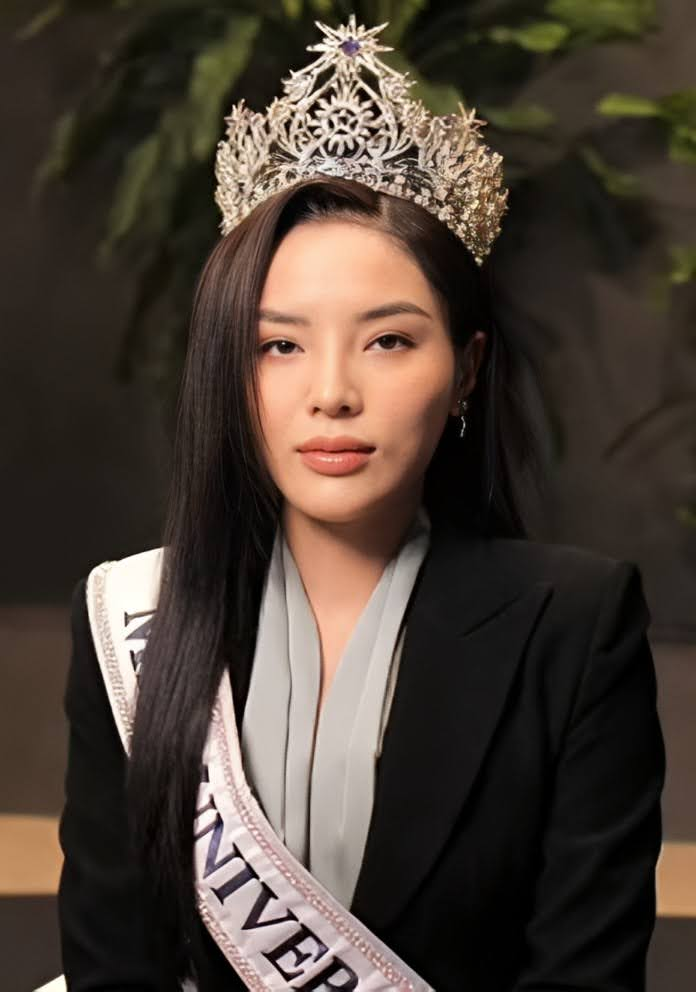
Nguyễn Cao Kỳ Duyên

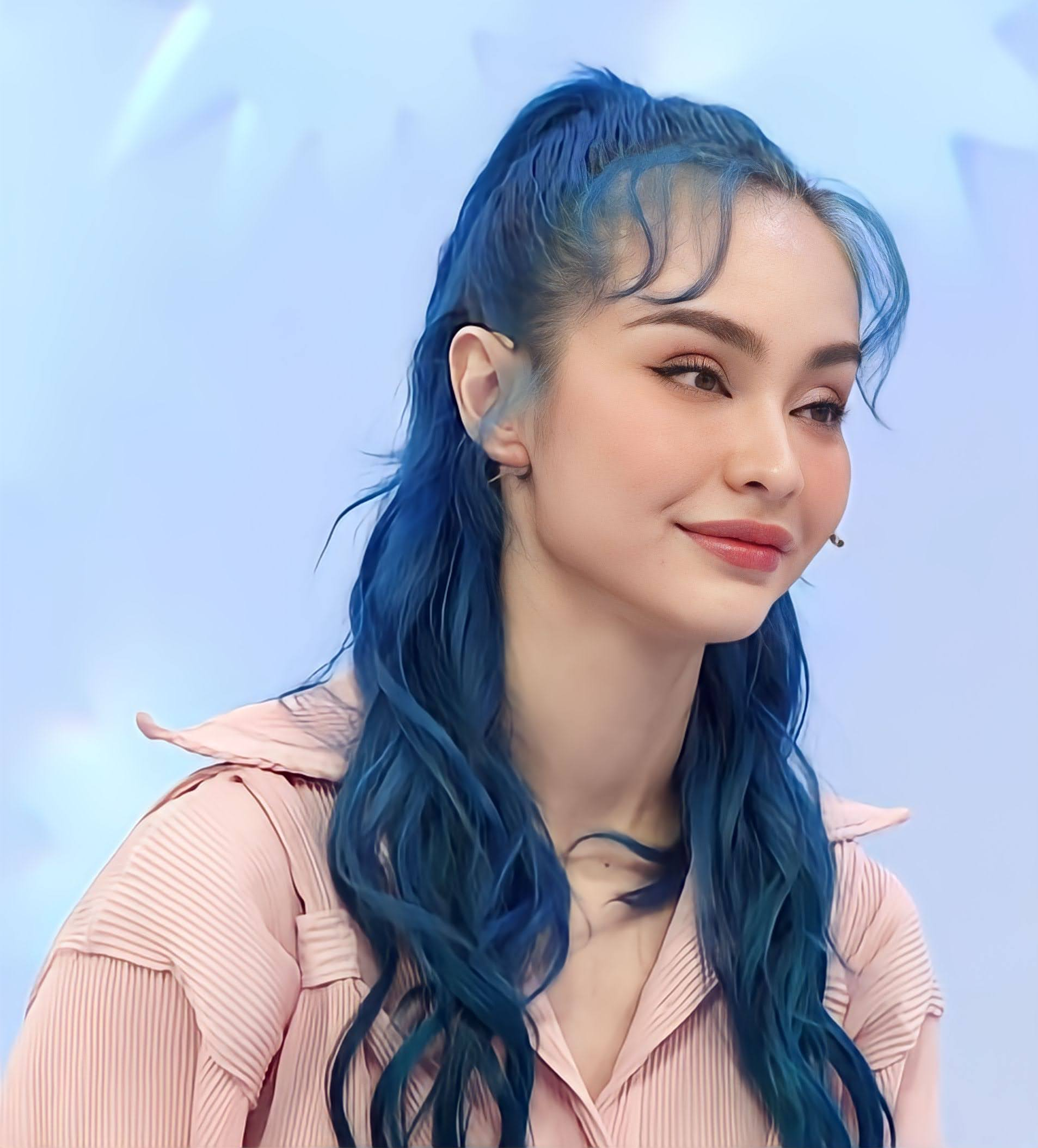
MLee

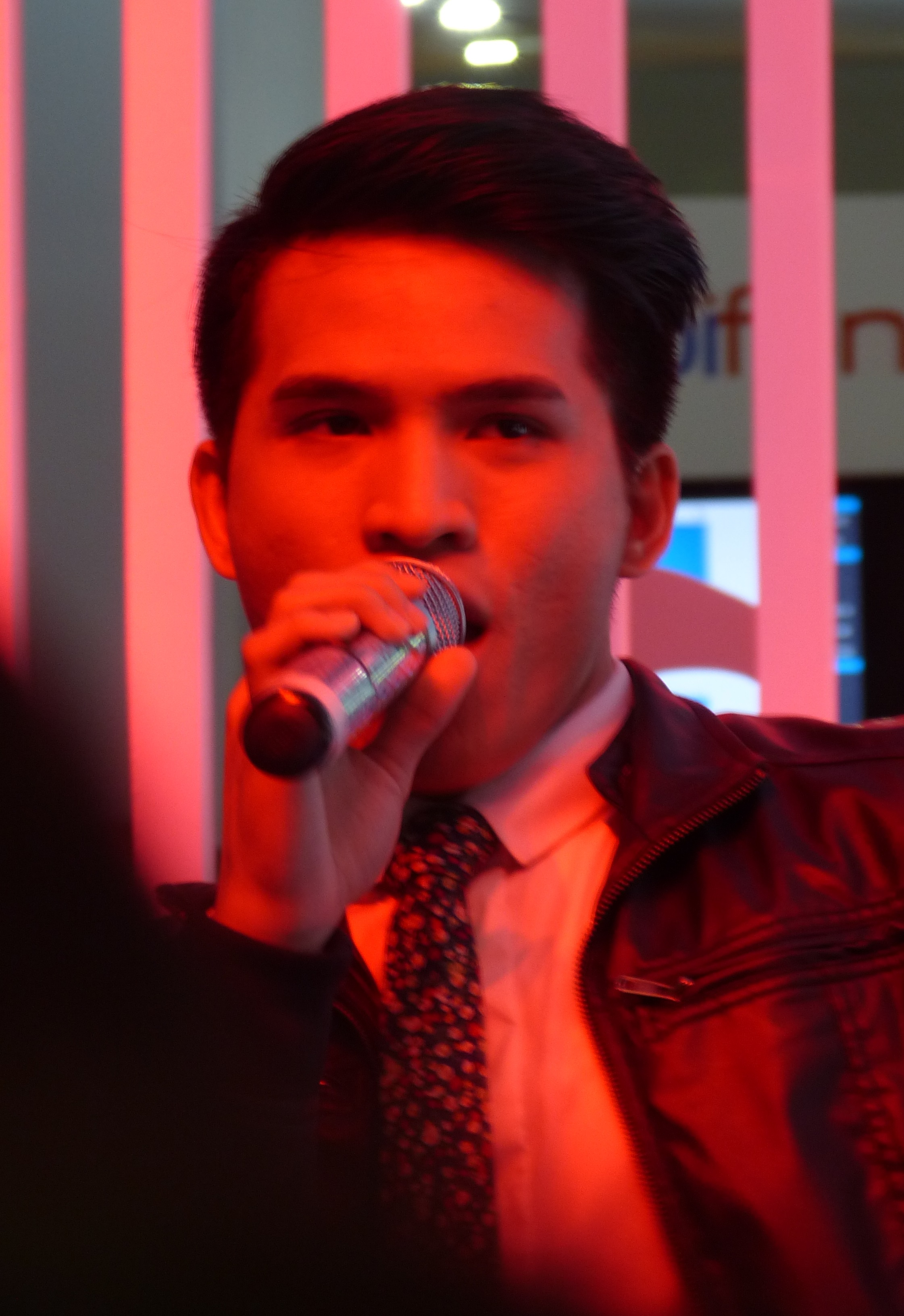
Quốc Thiên

Contestants	Season	Ref
Contestants	6	
Lệ Hằng	6	
H'Hen Niê	6	
S.T Sơn Thạch	6	
Bình An	6	
Xuân Tiền	6	
Đỗ Mỹ Linh	6	
Minh Triệu	6	
Nguyễn Cao Kỳ Duyên	6	
MLee	6	
Trần Quốc Anh	6	
Johnny	6	
Huy Trần	6	
Gia Huy	6	
Hoàng Hạnh	6	
Quốc Thiên	6	
Anh Quân	6	
Emma Nhất Khanh	6	
Tôn Kinh Lâm	6	
Xuân Tiến	6	
Minh Vũ	6	
