= Monkey bridge =

A monkey bridge may refer to:

- Simple suspension bridge, or rope bridge, a primitive type of bridge
- Cầu khỉ, a wood or bamboo walkway over gullies in Vietnam
- Monkey Bridge, a novel by Vietnamese-American writer Lan Cao
- Monkey bridge, the highest navigational platform on a bridge (ship)
- Saruhashi Bridge, a bridge in Ōtsuki, Japan, also known as "the monkey bridge".
