= The Amazing Race Vietnam 2012 =

Season of television series

- Season 2012
- Presented by: Dustin Nguyen
- No. of teams: 10
- Winners: Saettie Baggio & Thành Phúc
- No. of legs: 12
- Distance traveled: 1,316.69 mi (2,119.01 km)
- No. of episodes: 13

Release
- Original network: VTV3
- Original release: 18 May – 10 August 2012

Additional information
- Filming dates: 6 April – 5 May 2012

Series chronology
- Next → Season 2

The Amazing Race Vietnam: Cuộc đua kỳ thú 2012 is the first season of The Amazing Race Vietnam, a Vietnamese reality competition show based on the American series The Amazing Race. It featured ten teams of two in a race around Vietnam for 300 million₫.

The program premiered on VTV3 and aired every Friday primetime (8:00 p.m. UTC+7) from 18 May to 10 August 2012.

The first season was directed and hosted by Dustin Nguyen. He also served as an executive producer.

Friends and actors Saettie Baggio and Thành Phúc were the winners of this season.

== Production ==
=== Development and filming ===
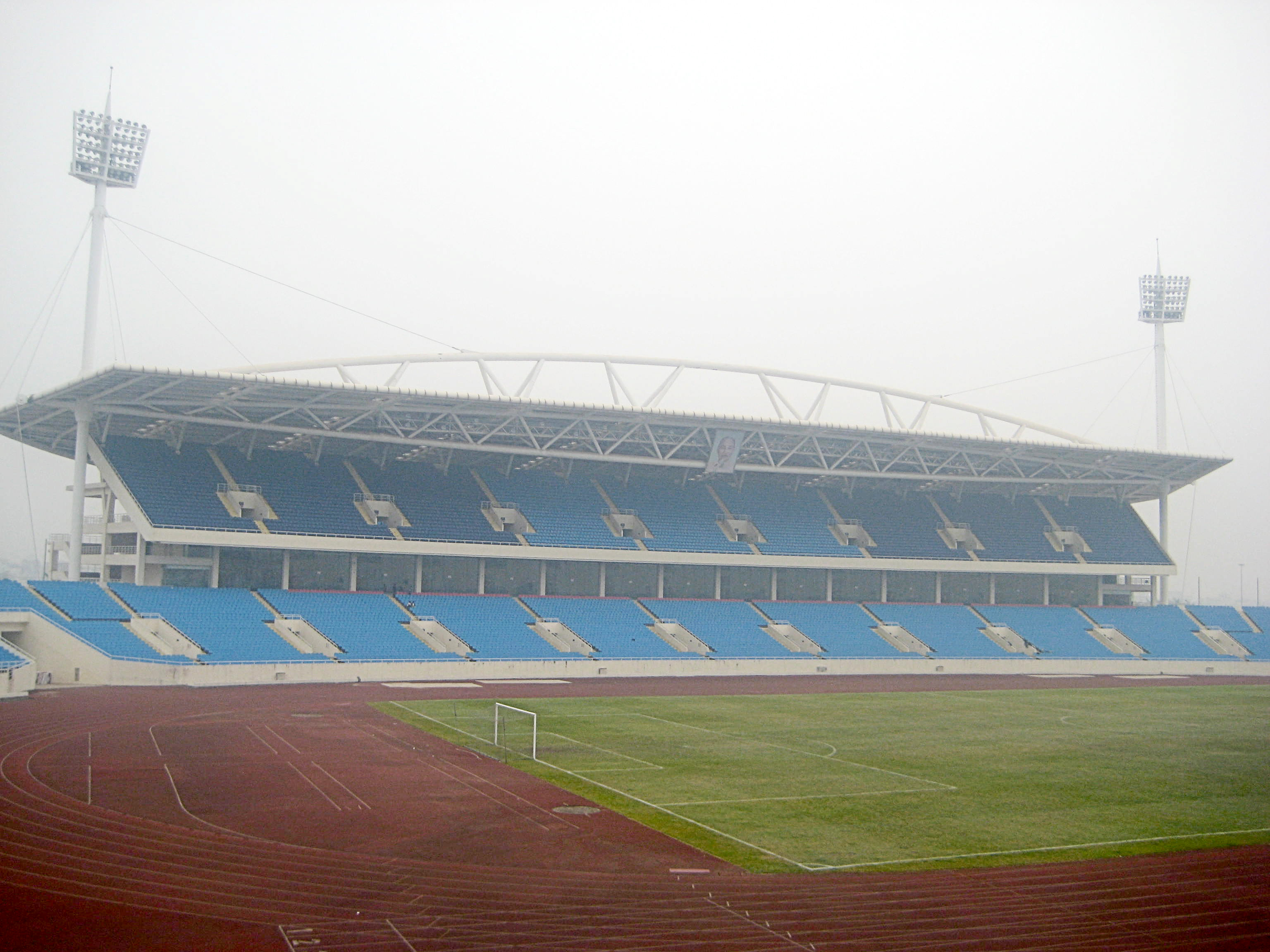
My Dinh National Stadium was the Starting Line of The Amazing Race Vietnam.

Filming was from 6 April 2012 to 5 May 2012.

Ten teams of two with pre-existing were chosen to join the race of about one month. Thirteen episodes were ordered with seven pit stops to eliminate teams. It was also reportedly announced that it would be the first-time ever in Vietnamese television history a TV series would be broadcast in high definition.

Route Markers were coloured orange and light green, whereas in the original the colour scheme is yellow and red.

In an interview with Variety in 2025, Nguyen called the filming experience brutal due to the show having one-tenth of a budget compared to the American and Australian versions of the show leading to his dual role as host and director on account of limited personnel.

=== Casting ===
Applications were accepted until 23 March 2012, with interviews in Ho Chi Minh City on 24 March and in Hanoi on 26 March.

=== Marketing ===
The show is sponsored by Sting Energy Drink.

== Cast ==
Contestants	Age	Relationship	Hometown	Status
Thanh Thủy Nguyễn	25	Best Friends	Hanoi	Eliminated 1st (in Hoa Lư, Ninh Bình)
Minh Thoa Vũ	25	Best Friends	Hanoi	Eliminated 1st (in Hoa Lư, Ninh Bình)
Richie Humphrey	39	Dating	Los Angeles, California	Eliminated 2nd (in Cúc Phương National Park, Ninh Bình)
Ngọc Phượng "Mimi" Lý Thị	23	Dating	Ho Chi Minh City	Eliminated 2nd (in Cúc Phương National Park, Ninh Bình)
Thanh Tuấn Phan Huỳnh	32	Married	Ho Chi Minh City	Eliminated 3rd (in Da Nang)
Mỹ Trâm Nguyễn Thị	27	Married	Ho Chi Minh City	Eliminated 3rd (in Da Nang)
Bảo Châu Trần Thị	34	Co-Workers		Eliminated 4th (in Huế, Thừa Thiên Huế)
Gia Bình Trần	33	Co-Workers		Eliminated 4th (in Huế, Thừa Thiên Huế)
Minh Châu Nguyễn	29	Best Friends	Hanoi	Eliminated 5th (in Nha Trang, Khánh Hòa)
Trần Châu Nguyễn	29	Best Friends	Hanoi	Eliminated 5th (in Nha Trang, Khánh Hòa)
Tuấn Anh Nguyễn	29	Cousins	Hanoi	Eliminated 6th (in La Gi, Bình Thuận)
Xuân Sơn Đỗ	24	Cousins	Hòa Bình, Hòa Bình	Eliminated 6th (in La Gi, Bình Thuận)
Chí Bình Nguyễn	31	Best Friends	Hanoi	Eliminated 7th (in Ho Chi Minh City)
Hồng Long Lê	29	Best Friends	Hanoi	Eliminated 7th (in Ho Chi Minh City)
Thành Chung Nguyễn	29	Brothers	Thái Nguyên, Thái Nguyên	Third Place
Thanh Bằng Nguyễn	27	Brothers	Thái Nguyên, Thái Nguyên	Third Place
Minh Hoàng Huỳnh	29	Dating	Ho Chi Minh City	Second Place
Phương Thảo Nguyễn Thị	28	Dating	Ho Chi Minh City	Second Place
Baggio Saetti	22	Friends	Ho Chi Minh City	Winners
Thành Phúc Nguyễn	22	Friends	Ho Chi Minh City	Winners

=== Future appearances ===
Richard "Richie" Humphrey and Ngọc Phượng "Mimi" Lý Thị later competed in the fifth season in 2016. Baggio & Thành Phúc appeared in a task during the tenth leg of the same season.

== Results ==
The following teams participated in the season, with their relationships at the time of filming. Note that this table is not necessarily reflective of all content broadcast on television due to inclusion or exclusion of some data. Placements are listed in finishing order:

Team	Position (by leg)													Roadblocks performed
Team	1	2	3	4	5	6	7	8	9	10	11^{10}		12	Roadblocks performed
Baggio & Thành Phúc	6th	2nd	1st	3rd	1stƒ	6th	5th	3rd	1st	3rd^{8}	3rd	1st	1st	Baggio 6, Thành Phúc 8
Minh Hoàng & Phương Thảo	7th	8th	6th	6th	3rd	4th	6th	1st	5th	4th^{8}^{,}^{9}	1st	3rd	2nd	Minh Hoàng 8, Phương Thảo 7
Thành Chung & Thanh Bằng	9th	7th	5th	5th	2nd	1st⊃	2nd	5th	3rd	2nd^{8}	4th	2nd	3rd	Thành Chung 8, Thanh Bằng 7
Chí Bình & Hồng Long	2nd	4th	3rd	2nd	5th	3rd	4th	2nd^{7}	4th	1st⊃	2nd	4th^{11}		Chí Bình 6, Hồng Long 7
Tuấn Anh & Xuân Sơn	4th	1st	9th	7th	7th^{5}	7th⊂	1st^{6}	4th	2nd	5th⊂				Tuấn Anh 6, Xuân Sơn 5
Minh Châu & Trần Châu	5th	6th	4th	1st	4th	5th	3rd	6th						Minh Châu 4, Trần Châu 4
Gia Bình & Bảo Châu	10th	9th^{2}	7th	8th	6th	2nd	7th							Gia Bình 2, Bảo Châu 5
Thanh Tuấn & Mỹ Trâm	3rd	3rd	2nd	4th	8th									Thanh Tuấn 2, Mỹ Trâm 3
Richie & Mimi	8th	10th	8th^{3}	9th										Richie 2, Mimi 2
Thanh Thủy & Minh Thoa	1st	5th^{1}	10thε											Thanh Thủy 1, Minh Thoa 1^{4}

Key

- A red team placement indicates that the team was eliminated.
- A blue team's placement indicates that the team came in last on a non-elimination leg.
  - An underlined blue team's placement indicates that the team came in last on a non-elimination leg and was "Marked for Elimination"; if the team did not finish 1st on the next leg, they would receive a 30-minute penalty.
  - An italicized blue team placement indicates that the team was the last to arrive at a Pit Stop in a non-elimination leg. If they did not arrive first on the next leg, they were then forced to relinquish all of their money. In addition, they would not be allotted any money for the following leg and were not allowed to collect money until the leg started for them.
- A purple ε indicates that the team decided to use the Express Pass on that Leg.
- A green ƒ indicates that the team won a Fast Forward.
- A brown ⊃ indicates that the team chose to use the U-Turn; ⊂ indicates the team who received it.
- Italicized results indicate the position of the team at the midpoint of a two-episode leg.

Notes

1. Thanh Thủy & Minh Thoa initially arrived 3rd, but were issued a 15-minute penalty for taking motorbikes instead of a taxi. Thanh Tuấn & Mỹ Trâm and Minh Châu & Trần Châu checked in during the penalty time, dropping Thanh Thủy & Minh Thoa to 5th.
2. Gia Bình & Bảo Châu initially arrived 9th, but were issued a 30-minute penalty for being "marked for elimination" and not arriving 1st. This did not affect their placement.
3. Richie & Mimi were subject to various changes on the third leg:
  - They initially arrived 5th at the Pit Stop, but were issued a 30-minute penalty because Mimi took off her life vest before the boat landed, creating a safety hazard. Three teams checked in during the penalty time, dropping them to 8th.
  - Because they did not arrive 1st for this leg, they were forced to give up all of their money. They also received no money on the following leg.
4. Thanh Thủy & Minh Thoa used the Express Pass to bypass the roadblock in Leg 3. Neither of them were shown choosing to perform the Roadblock, so it is not counted towards their Roadblock count.
5. Tuấn Anh & Xuân Sơn initially arrived 6th, but were issued a 30-minute penalty for not paying the taxi fare. Gia Bình & Bảo Châu checked in during the penalty time, dropping Tuấn Anh & Xuân Sơn to 7th.
6. Because Tuấn Anh & Xuân Sơn finished 1st, they were allowed to keep their money for the next leg.
7. Chí Bình & Hồng Long initially arrived 1st, but were issued a 45-minute penalty for pulling up the net at Anh Tin Fish Raft. Phương Thảo & Minh Hoàng checked in during the penalty time, dropping Chí Bình & Hồng Long to 2nd.
8. Thành Chung & Thanh Bằng, Baggio & Thành Phúc, and Phương Thảo & Minh Hoàng initially arrived 2nd, 3rd, and 4th, respectively, but were issued 30-minute penalties for not going in the correct direction in the Roadblock. This did not affect either teams' placements.
9. Phương Thảo & Minh Hoàng initially arrived 4th, but were issued a 30-minute penalty for being "marked for elimination" and not arriving 1st. This did not affect their placement.
10. Leg 11 was a double-length leg with two Roadblocks and two Detours and was shown over two episodes. The placements listed in the first column reflect the order teams arrived at the leg's halfway point.
11. Chí Bình & Hồng Long initially arrived 3rd, but were issued a 90-minute penalty for quitting the first task in Ho Chi Minh City. Phương Thảo & Minh Hoàng checked in during the penalty time, dropping Chí Bình & Hồng Long to last place and resulting in their elimination.

== Prizes ==
The prize for each leg is awarded to the first place team for that leg.

- Leg 1 – The Express Pass (Thẻ Ưu Tiên) – an item that can be used to skip any one task of the team's choosing up until the 8th leg.
- Leg 5 – Two nights at Fusion Maia Resort, Đà Nẵng.
- Leg 8 – Two nights at Vinpearl Resort, Nha Trang.
- Leg 9 – Two nights at Saigon - Dalat Hotel, Đà Lạt.
- Leg 10 – Two nights at Novotel Hotel, Phan Thiết.
- Leg 11 – Two nights at Vinpearl Resort, Nha Trang.
- Leg 12 – 300,000,000₫

== Race summary ==
Complete route map

Destinations	Air travel Rail travel Water travel Bus travel Helicopter travel Bicycle travel Gondola travel
Route Markers	Lựa chọn kép (Detour) Vượt rào (Roadblock) Nhảy cóc (Fast Forward); Rào cản (U-Turn) Về đích (Pit Stop)

=== Leg 1 (Hanoi) ===
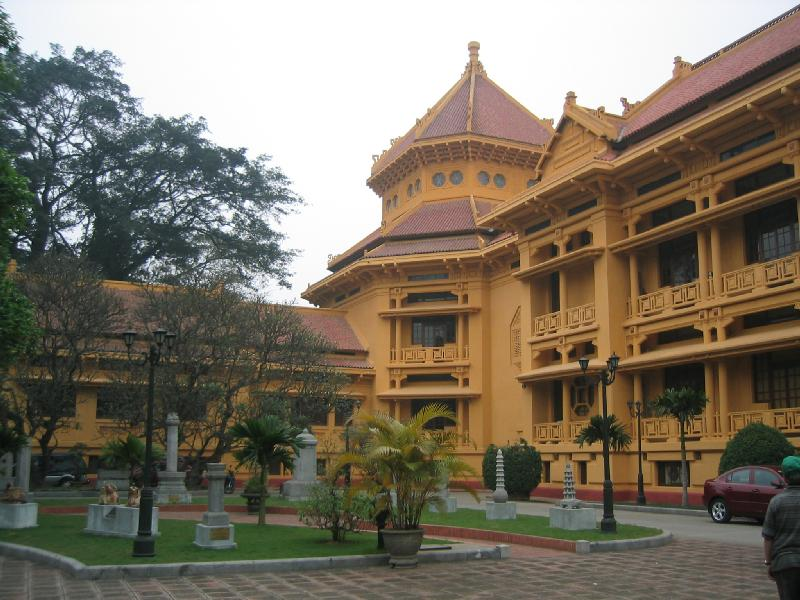
The courtyard of the National Museum of Vietnamese History served as the first ever Pit Stop on The Amazing Race Vietnam.

Airdate: 18 May 2012

- Hanoi, Vietnam (Mỹ Đình National Stadium) (Starting Line)
- Hanoi (Thanh Nien Street)
- Hanoi (Đồng Xuân Market and Old Quarter or Temple of Literature)
- Hanoi (National Museum of Vietnamese History)

In this series' first Roadblock, one team member had to climb the steps to the roof of the My Dinh National Stadium and abseil down to receive their next clue.

This series' first Detour was a choice between Phố Giăng Mắc Cửi (Maze of Streets) or Bút Hoa Lưu Truyền (Beautiful Words). In Crowded Streets, teams had to travel to Dong Xuan Market, where they received a list of six objects: two reed mats, two masks, one pipe & one feather duster. Then, teams had to locate three marked shops in the nearby Old Quarter that sold these objects with each shop selling different goods. After collecting all of the objects and delivering them back to the starting point, teams would receive their next clue. In Beautiful Words, teams had to travel to the Temple of Literature and engage in a traditional Vietnamese literal examination. One team member had to listen to a poet reciting a poem with four sentences and tell their partner the poem. This teammate would then write down the poem and show it to a calligraphist. If their poem was correct, the calligraphist would hand them their next clue. If their poem was wrong, team had to wait until one incense stick burned, about five minutes, before they could re-do the task.

Additional tasks

- At My Dinh National Stadium, teams had to search through 10,000 seats on the B stand for their very first clue.
- After completing the Roadblock, teams had to search for the clue box placed somewhere on Thanh Nien Street.

=== Leg 2 (Hanoi → Hòa Bình) ===
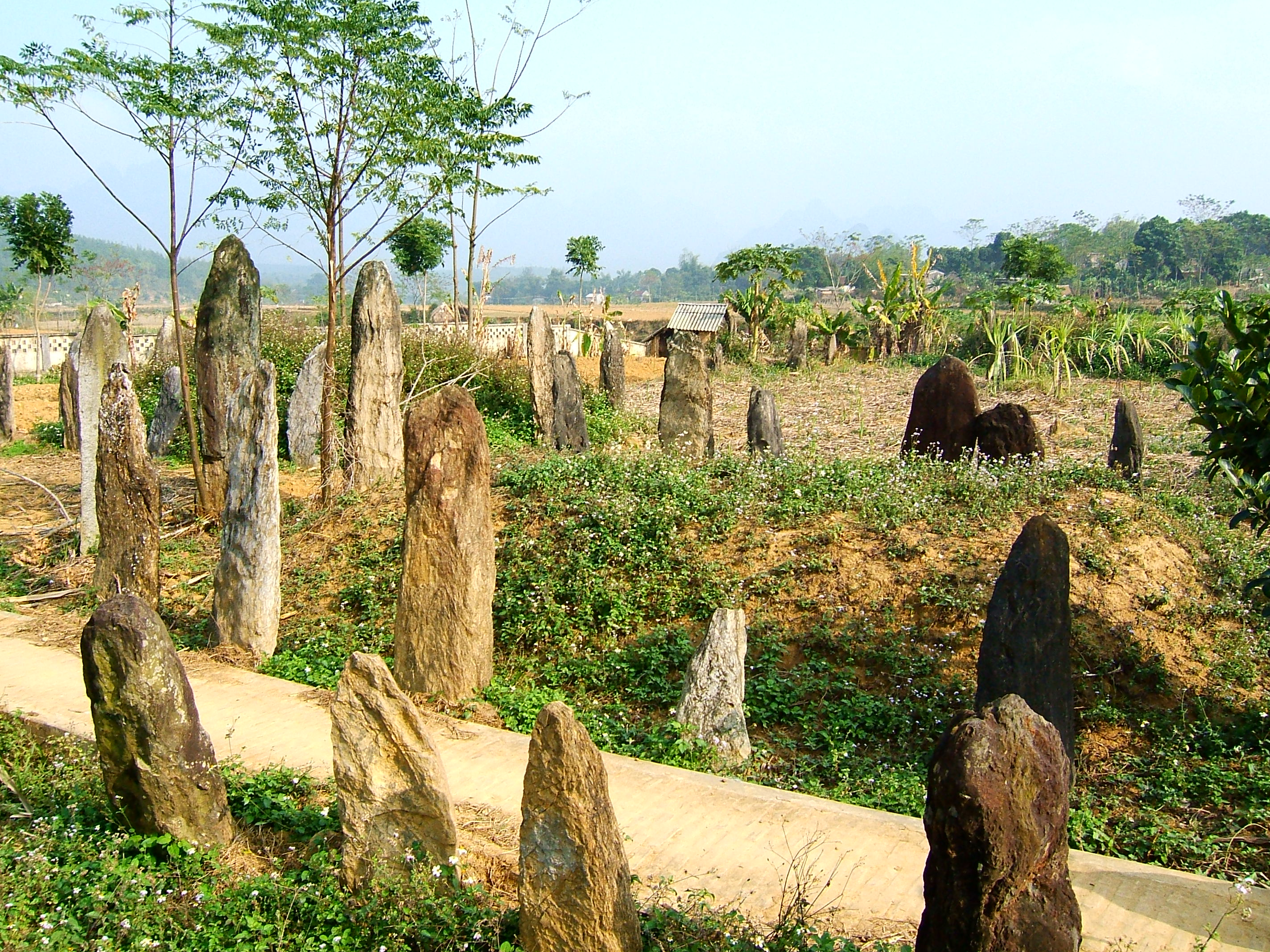
The Roadblock had one team member search the ground of Doch Thech Ancient Cemetery for hidden numbers.

Airdate: 25 May 2012

- Hanoi (My Dinh Bus Station) to Kim Bôi District, Hòa Bình Province (Kim Bôi Bus Station)
- Vĩnh Đồng (Dong Thech Ancient Cemetery)
- Hòa Bình (Hòa Bình Dam)
- Bình Thanh (Giang Mo Village)

In this leg's Roadblock, one team member had to search the ground of Doch Thech Ancient Cemetery for four hidden numbers: 1, 2, 5, 8. Then, they had to use these numbers to form a combination to open a four-digit combination lock. Each racer had a different set of combination.

This leg's Detour was a choice between two type of activities associated with Muong people: Nông Nhàn (Farm Play) or Nông Vụ (Farm Work). Both tasks had teams travel to Giang Mo Village. In Farm Play, both team member had to stilt-walk across a finish line to receive their next clue. If any team members fell from the stilts, that person had to walk the course again from the beginning. In Farm Work, each team member had to plough, fertilize and plant one furrow of sugarcane and couldn't help each other to receive their next clue from the farmer.

Additional task

- At Hòa Bình Dam, teams had to obtain water by throwing a bucket down into the Black River. After that, they needed to carry the water to the top of the dam until they obtained 10 liters of water to receive their next clue.

=== Leg 3 (Hòa Bình → Ninh Bình) ===
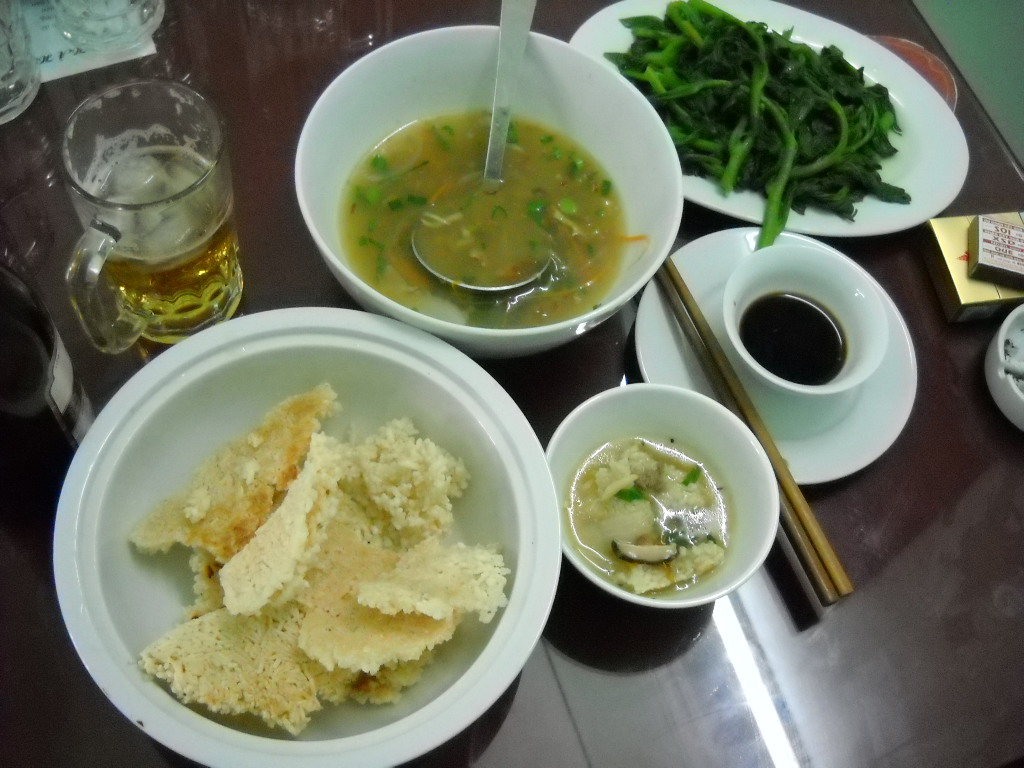
One Detour option in Ninh Bình required teams to eat 20 plates of cơm cháy.

Airdate: 1 June 2012

- Hòa Bình (Kim Bôi Bus Station) to Ninh Bình, Ninh Bình Province (Ninh Bình Bus Station)
- Ninh Bình (Qilin Mountain (in Vietnamese))
- Ninh Bình (Anh Luc's Goat Ranch or Grand Restaurant)
- Hoa Lư (Old Dock to Cây Bàng Marina)
- Hoa Lu (Thái Vi Temple (in Vietnamese))

This leg's Detour was a choice between two activities related to Ninh Binh's most famous products: goat for Chơi (Play) or cơm cháy for Ăn (Eat). In Play, teams traveled to Anh Luc's Goat Ranch. Here, one team member was blindfolded and had to follow verbal directions from the other team member to catch a goat in a mud enclosure wearing the same color as their blindfolded cloth. After catching the goat, racers could take off their blindfolds and herd the animal back to its pen to receive their next clue. In Eat, teams had to travel to Grand Restaurant in Tràng An Marina and eat 20 plates of cơm cháy to receive their next clue.

In this leg's Roadblock, one team member had to climb the stairs of Tam Quan Gate at Cây Bàng Marina and find a young monk, who would tell them to count the stairs' steps. While counting, racers were also distracted by a loudspeaker recounting the Trần dynasty's history. If they came up with the correct answer (214), they would receive their next clue.

Additional task

- At the Old Dock, teams had to paddle across the water to retrieve their next clue at Cây Bàng Marina.

=== Leg 4 (Ninh Bình) ===
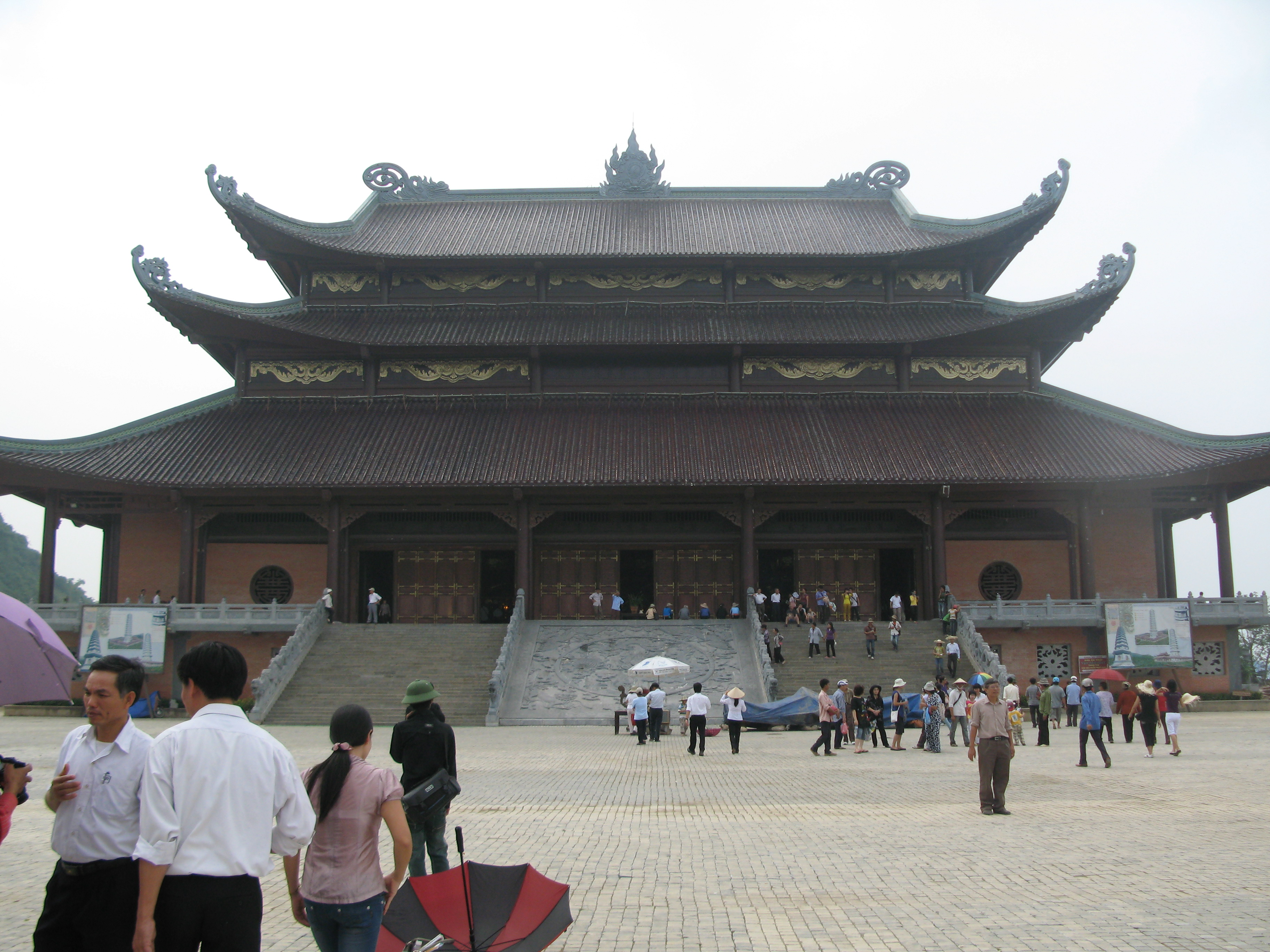
Teams had to ride a bicycle from Bái Đính Temple (pictured) to Cave of Prehistoric Man in Cúc Phương National Park.

Airdate: 8 June 2012

- Ninh Bình (Bái Đính Temple) to Cúc Phương National Park (Cave of Prehistoric Man (in Vietnamese))
- Cúc Phương National Park
- Cúc Phương National Park (Central Resting Point)

This leg's Detour was a choice between Rừng Rậm (Thick Jungle) or Rừng Thưa (Thin Jungle). In Thick Jungle, teams had to make their way to a marked jungle area. Here, they had to search through the density to find clues hidden among leaves, branches and vines. In Thin Jungle, team members' legs would be tied together like a three-legged race, and they had to pass through a series of ropes without ringing any bells to retrieve their next clue. If a bell rang, teams had start again from the beginning.

In this leg's Roadblock, one team member had to crawl into a snake cage and retrieve a clue put under a python.

Additional tasks

- Teams had to find a walking photographer keeping their clues within the entrance zone of Bái Đính Temple.
- Both team members had to ride a bicycle from Bái Đính Temple to Cave of Prehistoric Man in Cúc Phương National Park. The trip was approximately 57 km (35.4 miles) in length.

=== Leg 5 (Ninh Bình → Da Nang) ===
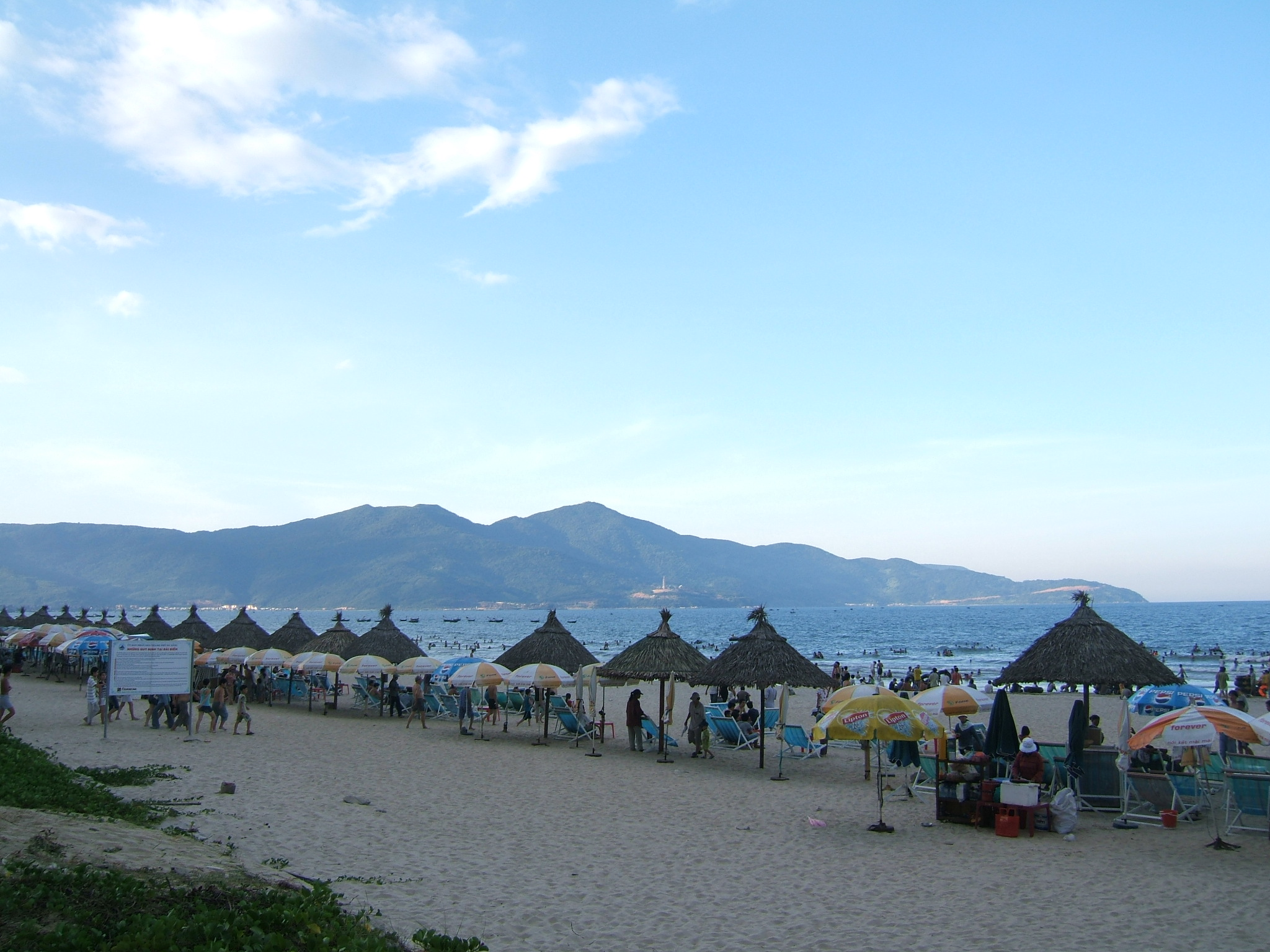
The first Fast Forward of The Amazing Race Vietnam required team members to convince any person on the My Khe Beach to have their head shaved.

Airdate: 15 June 2012

- Ninh Bình (Ninh Bình Train Station) to Da Nang (Da Nang Train Station)
  - Da Nang (My Khe Beach)
- Da Nang (Bà Nà Hills)
- Da Nang (Nguyen Hung Stone or Sandy Beach Resort)
- Da Nang (Da Nang Golf Club)
- Da Nang (Quán Bê Thui Thương)
- Da Nang (Fusion Maia Resort)

In this season's only Fast Forward, one team had to travel to My Khe Beach and convince any person they could find on the beach to have his/her head shaved to win the Fast Forward award.

This leg's Detour was a choice between Hoa Tay (Finger) or Lòng Tay (Palm). In Finger, teams had to travel to Nguyen Hung Stone and attempt to make a living statue. One team member had to strip down and pretend to be a stone figure while the other team member painted his/her partner's body with white paint, and could only use one finger to do so, to receive their next clue. In Palm, teams had to travel to Sandy Beach Resort, where they had to dig in a marked sand area on the beach for a clue buried somewhere one metre below the sand, with only their bare hands.

In this leg's Roadblock, one team member had to carry a tray of Sting bottles to Quán Bê Thui Thương and serve customers until they received an Amazing Race sticker, which they could trade for their next clue. If any teams ran out of Sting, they had to go back to the starting point and refill.

Additional tasks

- At the Da Nang Train Station, teams had to search for the clue at the train sculpture in front of the station.
- At Da Nang Golf Club, each team member picked a golf ball to randomly determine their roles as a golfer and a caddie. They could not change their roles during this challenge. The golfer had to successfully hit a ball into hole no. 16 within two strokes to receive the next clue. While the golfer playing, the caddie had to always carry a heavy golf bag. If the golf bag was put on the ground, the golfer had to pause from playing until the caddie picked it up again.

=== Leg 6 (Da Nang → Quang Nam) ===
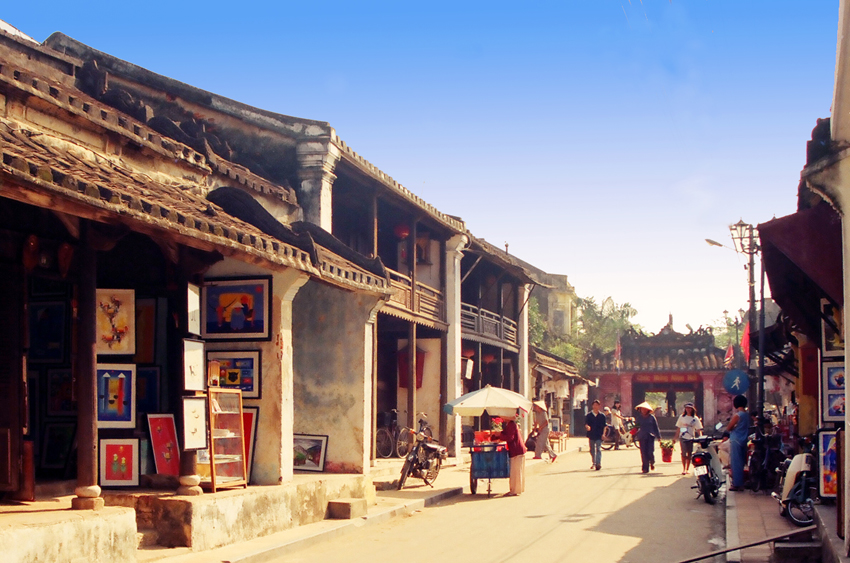
Teams traveled to the Ancient Town of Hội An and experienced its fame with clothes and lantern making.

Airdate: 22 June 2012

- Hội An, Quảng Nam Province (Thanh Hà Pottery Village)
- Hội An (Hội A Heritage Preserving Centre)
- Hội An (Yaly Sew Factory)
- Hội An (Streets)
- Hội An (Hội An Museum of Cultural History)
- Hội An (Old Wooden Boat on Hoai River)

In this leg's Roadblock, one team member had to successfully sew a cushion's cover to a chief tailor's satisfaction to receive their next clue.

This leg's Detour was a choice between Trang Trải (Make a Living) or Trang Trọng (Solemn). In Make a Living, teams had to sell bánh tiêu from a movable vendor until they earned 400,000 VND to receive their next clue. In Solemn, teams had to figure out by themselves how to create the symbol of Hội An, a cloth lantern, to receive their next clue from a lantern maker.

Additional tasks

- At Thanh Hà Pottery Village, teams had to shape a medium-sized clay bowl using a potter's kick wheel to the satisfaction of a potter to receive their next clue.
- From Thanh Hà Pottery Village, teams had to deliver one bicycle and a big coracle to Hoi An's Heritage Preserving Centre before retrieving their next clue. During this challenge, teams weren't allowed to ask for assistance from any bystanders or use any sorts of transportation excluding the bicycle they were provided.

=== Leg 7 (Quảng Nam → Thừa Thiên Huế) ===
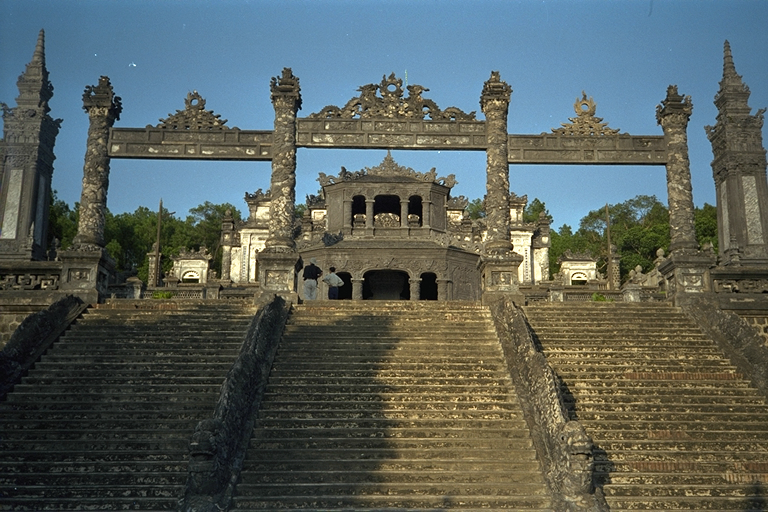
Teams traveled to Khai Dinh Tomb to complete a sliding puzzle that would reveal the leg's next location.

Airdate: 29 June 2012

- Da Nang (Da Nang Bus Station) to Huế, Thừa Thiên Huế Province (Huế Bus Station)
- Huế (Thanh Toàn Tiled Bridge (in Vietnamese))
- Huế (Dạ Lê Thượng Shrine or Hương Thủy)
- Huế (Khải Định Tomb)
- Huế (Minh Mạng Tomb)
- Huế (Quoc Hoc Stone Tablet to Imperial City)

This leg's Detour was a choice between Thân Ngọc Mình Ngà (The Beauty) or Lưng Dài Vai Rộng (The Bold). In The Beauty, teams had to make 400 sticks of incense at Dạ Lê Thượng Shrine to receive their next clue. In The Bold, teams had to travel to Hương Thủy village, where they would have to run through a muddy course without being forced out of the boundary by six professional wrestlers to receive their next clue. Teams were allowed to tackle the wrestlers but not to injure them by any means. Only one team could attempt this task at a time. If a team member were forced out of the boundary, both of them had to start again from the beginning.

In this leg's Roadblock at Minh Mạng Tomb, one team member had to memorize both of the reign times and the faces of seven kings from the Nguyễn dynasty. Then they had to pick up 20 wooden tablets indicating four different time durations: 1, 2, 5 and 10 years. After that, they had to bring these tablets to the inner area of the temple and place the times corresponding to each of the seven kings to receive their next clue. If they were incorrect, they had to travel back to the front of the temple and collect a new set of wooden tablets.

Additional tasks

- At the Thanh Toàn Tiled Bridge, teams had to find Madame Trần Thị Dìu, a famous fortune teller, and ask for their next clue.
- At the Tomb of Khải Định, teams had to complete a sliding puzzle.
- After finishing the sliding puzzle task, teams were required to wear a traditional costume and continue to wear it for the remainder of the leg. Teams also received a hint saying "Result is Destination", leaving them to figure out that their next destination was actually the image on their puzzle.
- At Quoc Hoc Stone Tablet, teams had to pick a cyclo and use it to travel to the Pit Stop at the Imperial City.

=== Leg 8 (Thừa Thiên Huế → Khánh Hòa) ===
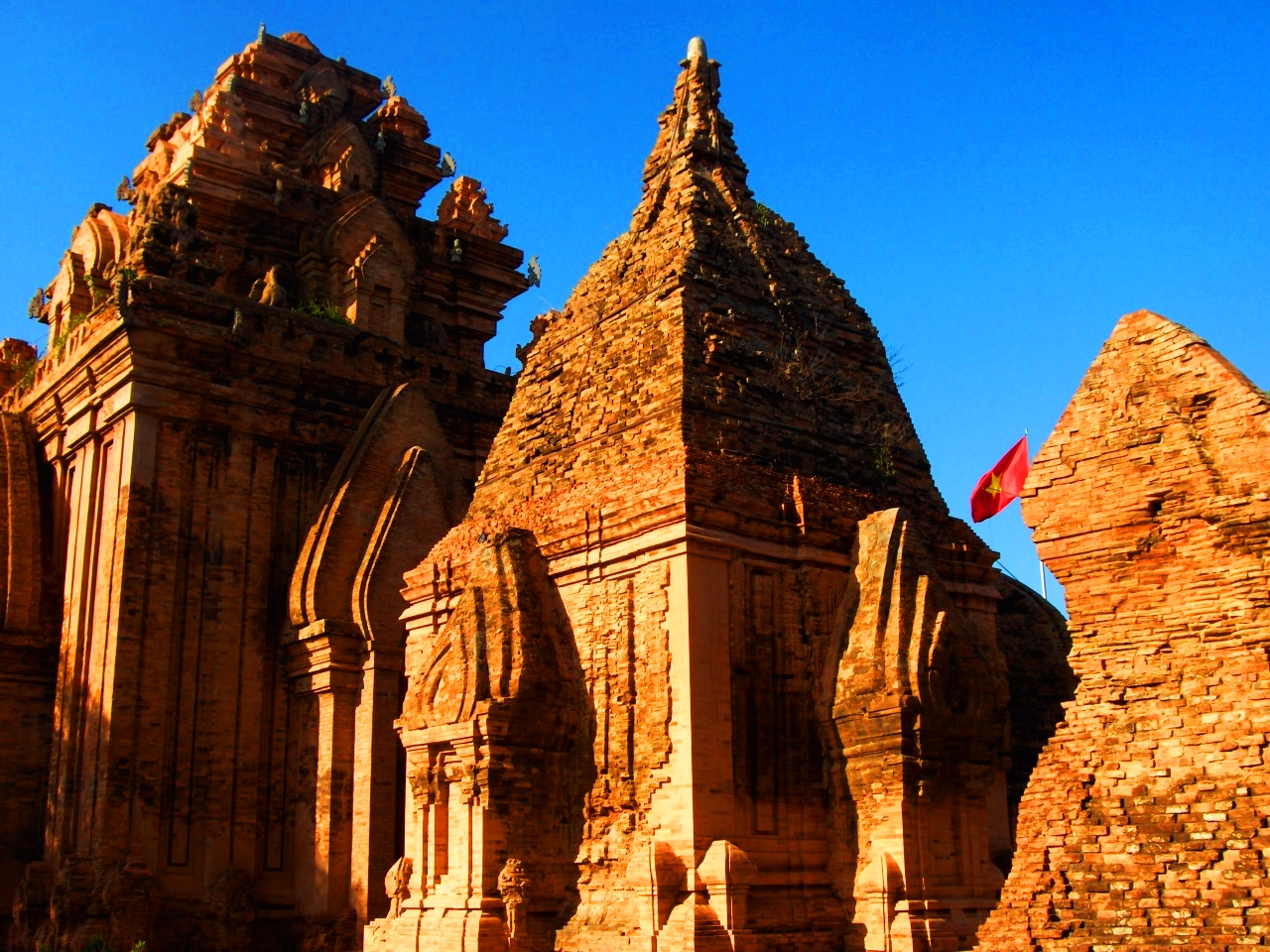
The Po Nagar Towers served as the Pit Stop of this leg.

Airdate: 6 July 2012

- Huế (Huế Bus Station) to Nha Trang, Khánh Hòa Province (Nha Trang Bus Station)
- Nha Trang (City Cultural House)
- Nha Trang (Sheraton Hotel)
- Vũng Ngán (Anh Tín Fish Raft)
- Nha Trang (Cầu Khỉ)
- Nha Trang (Po Nagar)

This leg's Detour was a choice between Mềm (Soft) or Dai (Tough). In Soft, teams had to make a bed according to Sheraton's standards to receive their next clue. Teams were given only one bed to examine as a sample. In Tough, teams had to make 16 bowls of noodles from dough to the satisfaction of a chef to receive their next clue.

In this leg's Roadblock, one team member had to walk on a cầu khỉ (monkey bridge) to reach a hanging clue at the other end.

Additional tasks

- The clue at the City Cultural House said that both Detour tasks would be taking place in a hotel that has the highest bar in town. Teams had to find out that location is the Sheraton Hotel and travel there on foot.
- After the Detour, teams took a speed boat to Anh Tín Fish Raft, where they had to use a provided net to catch 3 fish. Then, teams had to swim with the fish in a spongy box to a nearby shore to receive their next clue.
- After the fish task, teams had to paddle a kayak to a marked area, where they had to dive into the water to untie a clue hidden in a coral reef.

=== Leg 9 (Khánh Hòa → Lâm Đồng) ===
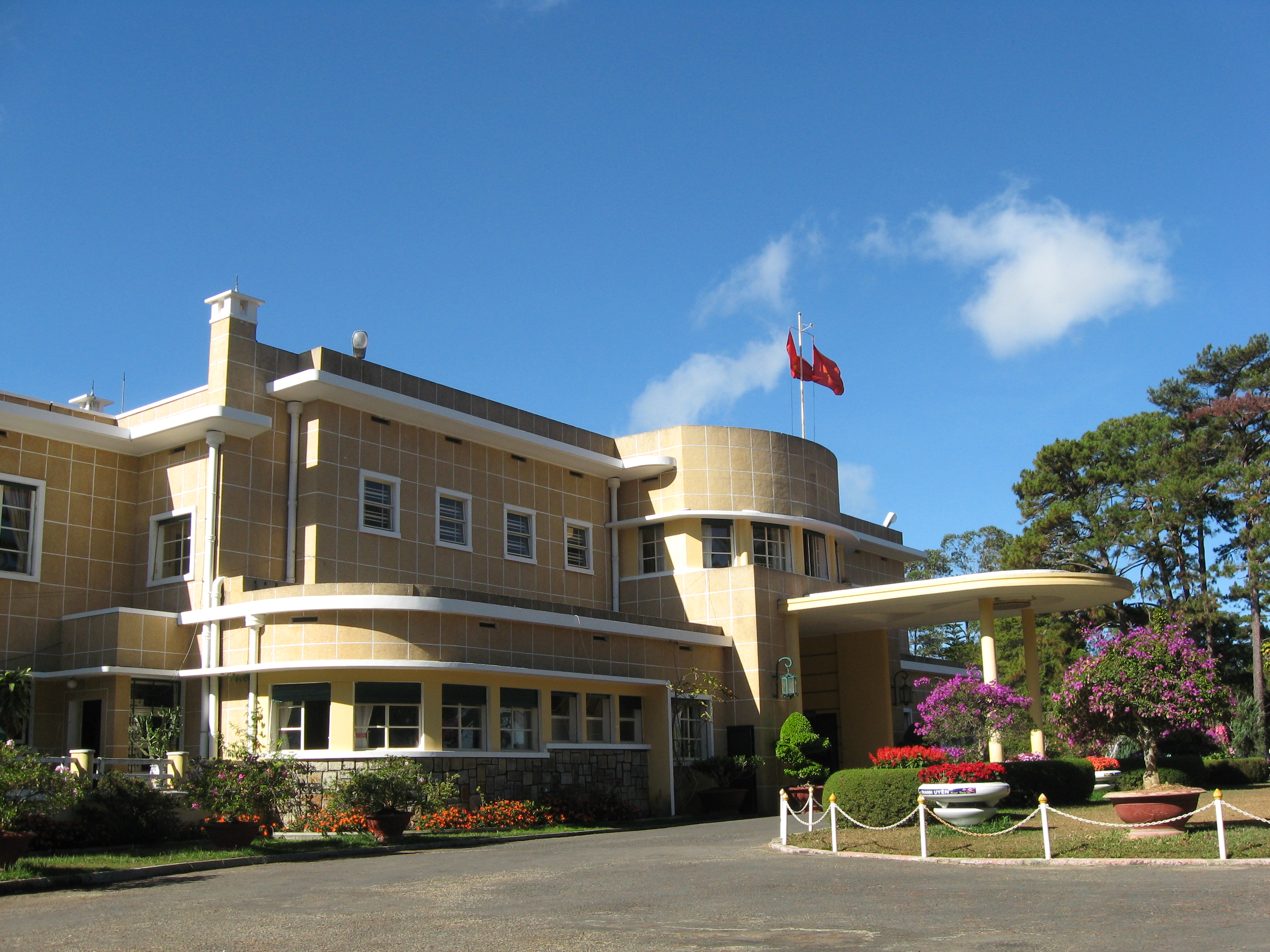
The first clue of Leg 9 instructed teams to travel to Bảo Đại 3rd Palace in Da Lat, where teams had to arrange a flower vase.

Airdate: 13 July 2012

- Nha Trang (Nha Trang Bus Station) to Da Lat, Lâm Đồng Province (Phuong Trang Bus Station)
- Da Lat (Bảo Đại 3rd Palace)
- Da Lat (Datanla Falls (in Vietnamese))
- Da Lat (Xuan Huong Lake)
- Da Lat (Mount Langbiang (in Vietnamese))
- Da Lat (Da Lat Marketplace to Lâm Đồng Sponsoring Centre)
- Da Lat (Da Lat Cable Car Station)

In this leg's first Roadblock, one team member had to slide down a stream, abseil down a waterfall to retrieve a hanging clue, jump down from a rock cliff, then return to their partner.

In this leg's second Roadblock, the team member who did not perform the previous Roadblock had to dress up as K'Ho people and ride a horse to a pole holding a bag of arrows. After that, they had to ride the horse to an archer's yard and use a crossbow to shoot one arrow into a bull's eye to receive their next clue. If they ran out of arrows, they had to ride the horse back to retrieve more arrows.

Additional tasks

- The first clue told teams to travel to the Summer Palace leaving teams to find out that the Summer Palace is another name of Bảo Đại 3rd Palace in Da Lat.
- At Bảo Đại 3rd Palace, teams had to collect different types of flowers from several girls scattered around the palace and then arrange a flower vase as close to the sample that was given to them to receive their next clue.
- At Da Lat Marketplace, teams were given 500,000 VND ($25) to buy a list of items; however, the money provided was less than the total cost meaning teams had to negotiate for lower prices. After buying all of the items, teams had to deliver them to Lâm Đồng Sponsoring Centre on a tandem bicycle to receive their next clue.

=== Leg 10 (Lâm Đồng → Bình Thuận) ===
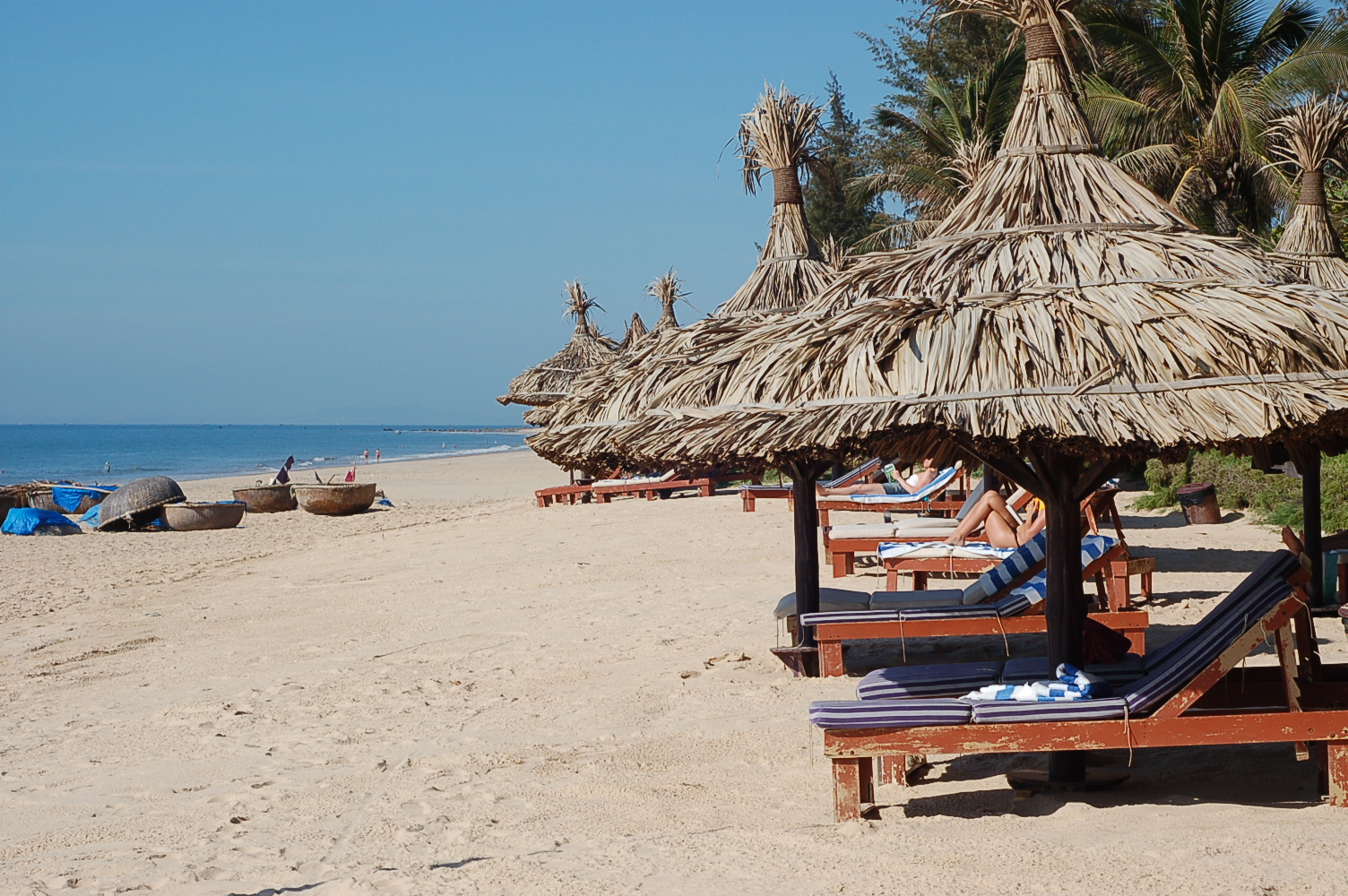
For one of the Detour choices in Mui Ne, teams had to go to Mui Ne Beach and paddle out to sea to retrieve the next clue.

Airdate: 20 July 2012

- Phan Thiết, Bình Thuận Province (Yen Gia Restaurant)
- Phu Hai, Phan Thiết (Fish Sauce of Phan Thiết JSC)
- Ham Tien, Phan Thiết (VidoTour Travel Company)
- Mũi Né, Phan Thiết (Trước Beach Fishing Village)
- Mũi Né, Phan Thiết (Mui Ne Beach or Home of Dia)
- Mũi Né, Phan Thiết (White Lake (in Vietnamese))
- La Gi (Lở Ravine)

This leg's Detour was a choice between Biển Xanh (Blue Sea) or Suối Đỏ (Red Stream). In Blue Sea, teams traveled to Mui Ne Beach and had to paddle out to sea in round basket boats and retrieve one of five keys hidden inside 500 ml of bottles of Sting. In Red Stream, teams traveled to the house of Dia and had to load 100 coconuts onto a cattle-drawn carriage and deliver them to the Fairy Stream (Suối Tiên) without dropping any to receive their next clue.

In this leg's Roadblock, one team member had to ride a dune buggy across the nearby sand dunes and follow a marked course, searching for their next clue in one of twenty pots in the sand.

Additional tasks

- The clue teams received at the Fish Sauce of Phan Thiet JSC was written entirely in Russian.
- At VidoTour Travel Company's branch office, teams had to look for someone named Chi. She would give them their next clue, instructing them to remove all four tires on a jeep and inflate them before being driven to their next location.
- At Trước Beach, teams had to search for their next clue, hidden in a basket on a boat.

=== Leg 11 (Bình Thuận → Kiên Giang → Ho Chi Minh City) ===
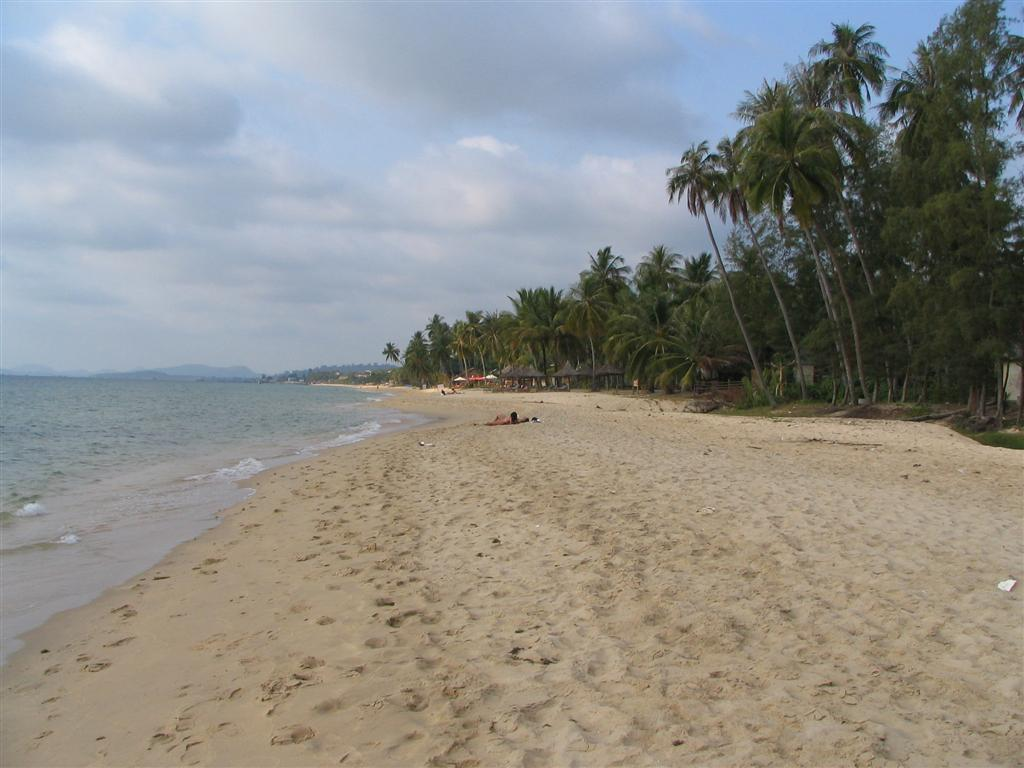
Phu Quoc Beach is the site of the first Roadblock of this leg.

Airdate: 27 July 2012

- Phan Thiết (Phan Thiết Bus Station) to Ho Chi Minh City (Mien Dong Coach Station)
- Ho Chi Minh City (Tan Son Nhat International Airport) to Phú Quốc, Kiên Giang Province (Phu Quoc International Airport)
- Phú Quốc (Lien Au Restaurant)
- Phú Quốc (Phú Quốc Pearl Oyster Farm)
- Phú Quốc (Pepper Farm or Phú Quốc Ice Factory)
- Phú Quốc (Phú Quốc Prison)
- Phú Quốc (Phú Quốc Beach)
- Phú Quốc (Chez Carole Resort)

This leg's first Detour was a choice between Nóng (Hot) or Lạnh (Cold). In Hot, teams had to travel to a pepper farm, where they had to separate all of the fresh pepper seeds from a pile of dried pepper seeds. In Cold, teams traveled to an Ice Factory (Phân Xưởng Nước Đá) where they would find their next clue frozen in a block of ice. They had to use only an ice cream scoop to hack away at the ice to get their clue.

In this leg's first Roadblock, one team member had to guide a key through a rope maze. After extracting the key, they had to pull on a rope to pull a heavy wooden crate out of the sea and use the key to unlock it. Inside, they would find three photographs. They would finally have to search the beach for three parts of a map, which identified the location of the Chez Carole Resort.

Additional tasks

- At Lien Au Restaurant, teams must chase and catch a wild boar piglet with a bandana around its neck, which they could exchange for their next clue.
- At the Oyster Pearl Farm, teams must use tools to implant 10 pearls into 10 oysters. If they insert their tools into the oyster improperly or kill an oyster, they would receive a 5 minutes penalty for each error before getting their next clue.
- At the Phú Quốc Prison, one team member had to answer a quiz with 10 questions. The other team member then had to enter the prison and search for these 10 questions hidden around the prison, also answering them and trying to match their partner's answers. Every time the second team member answered a question wrong, a large coconut would be added to the baskets the first team member was carrying. That team member had to withstand the weight of these coconuts and carry them through a thin path surrounded by barbed wire until their partner answered all questions correctly. A 2-hour penalty would be applied if teams couldn't bear the weight any more. After the penalty, they would have to continue with the task, but could start again with empty baskets.

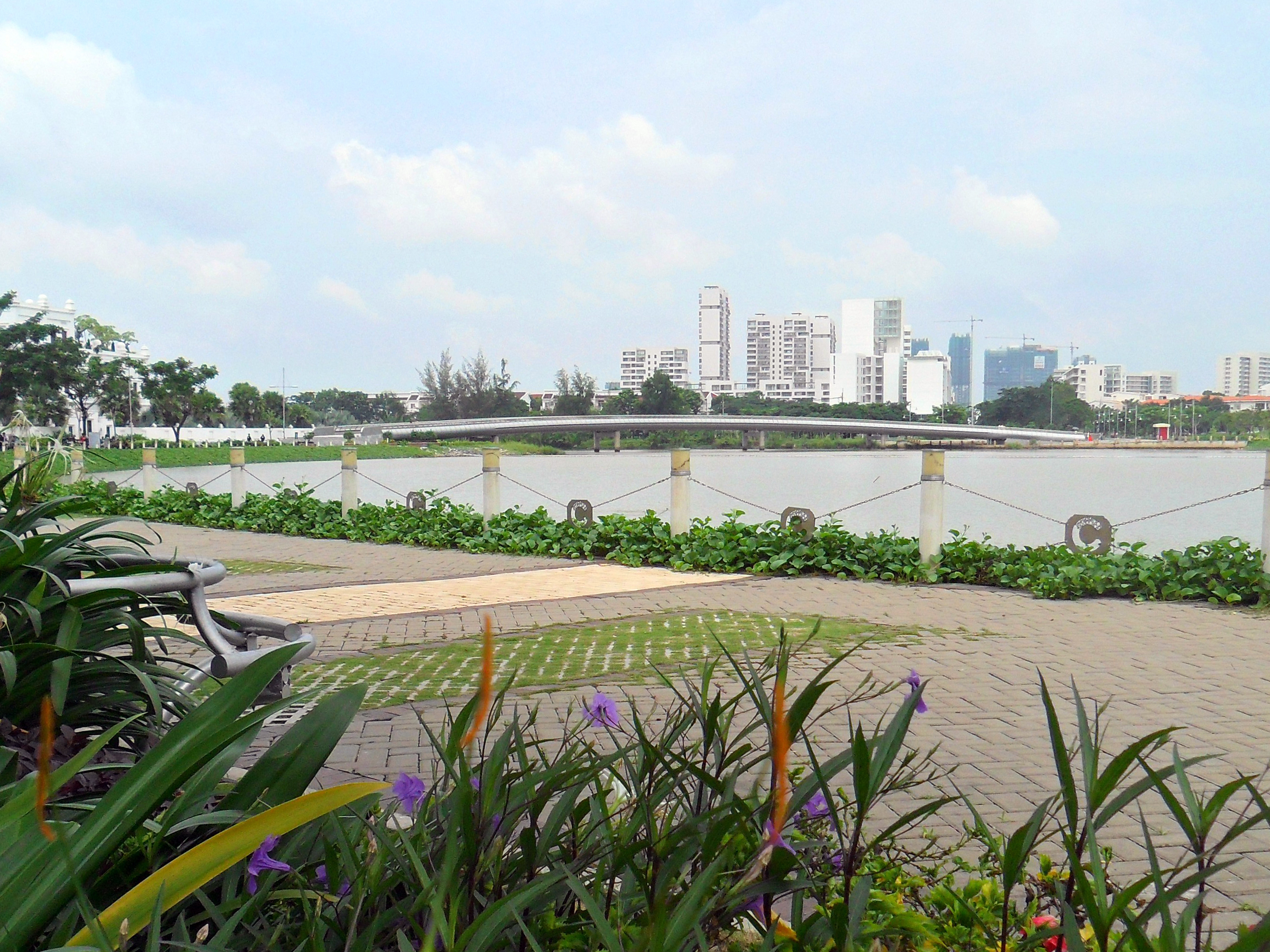
The Starlight Bridge in the urban area of Phú Mỹ Hưng was the 11th Pit Stop of The Amazing Race Vietnam.

Airdate: 3 August 2012

- Phú Quốc (Phú Quốc Ferry Terminal) to Rạch Giá (Rạch Giá Ferry Terminal)
- Rạch Giá (Rạch Giá Bus Station) to Ho Chi Minh City (Mien Tay Bus Station (in Vietnamese))
- Ho Chi Minh City (District 4 Sports and Gymnastics Center)
- Ho Chi Minh City (Martial Arts Training Center or Ho Chi Minh University of Film and Theater)
- Ho Chi Minh City (23/9 Park Circus)
- Ho Chi Minh City (Starlight Bridge (in Vietnamese))

This season's final Detour was a choice between Mát Mắt (Eyes) or Mát Tai (Ears). In Eyes, teams had to travel to the Martial Arts Training Center and learn and perform a series of martial arts moves to the satisfaction of a master to receive their clue. In Ears, teams had to travel to the University of Film and Theater and learn and perform the Cải lương play Lan and Diep to receive their next clue.

In this leg's second Roadblock, one team member had to perform three circus acts in any order of balancing on a balancing board for three minutes, spinning three hula hoops without dropping any for another three minutes and successfully performing a flying trapeze to receive their next clue.

Additional task

- At the Sports and Gymnastics Center, teams traveled to the swimming pool, where one team member entered an underwater cage with little breathing space. The other team member then needed to solve five extremely complex math problems without using paper or a calculator. They would then have to swim 50m across the pool and use the five answers they came up with to unlock the cage's padlock. Finally, both team members then had to place 11 flags on a large map of Vietnam, representing the 11 locations they visited.

=== Leg 12 (Ho Chi Minh City → Đồng Nai → Binh Duong → Ho Chi Minh City) ===
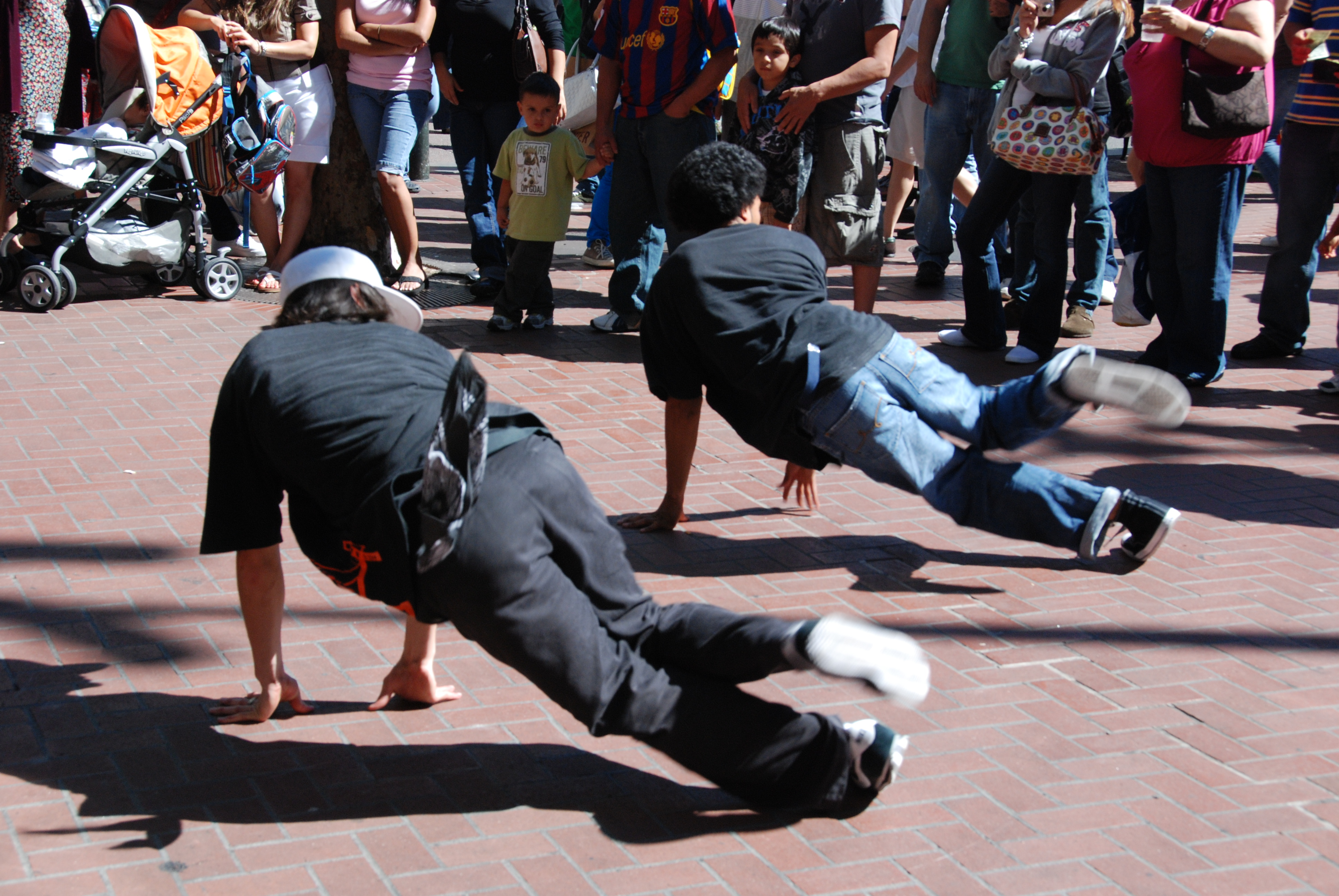
Teams have to perform a series of breakdance moves as part of the tasks in the final leg.

Airdate: 10 August 2012

- Ho Chi Minh City (Canh Vien Park)
- Biên Hòa, Đồng Nai Province (AMATA Industrial Zone – PepsiCo Factory)
- Dĩ An, Bình Dương Province (Hung Dao Container Area)
- Ho Chi Minh City (Ong Cay Bridge)

In this leg's first Roadblock, one team member had to climb up to the top of a stack of large shipping container and then balance across a thin metal beam to the top of another stack to receive their next clue.

In this season's final Roadblock, the team member who did not perform the previous Roadblock had to perform a two-minute action hero stunt. They had to outrun two men on motorcycles and use a stunt trampoline to climb over a shipping container. They then had to climb a rope ladder to a container suspended above the ground, where they would have to engage in a stunt fight. Finally, they would have to jump through a fake wall and fall onto a cushion to receive their final clue.

Additional tasks

- At Canh Vien Park, teams had to learn and perform a series of breakdance moves to receive their next clue.
- At the PepsiCo Factory, teams had to arrange 286 boxes of Sting Energy Drink into a 6-layer pyramid to receive their next clue.
