= Once Upon a Time in Vietnam =

- The film poster.
- Directed by: Dustin Nguyen
- Written by: Dustin Nguyen
- Produced by: Dustin Nguyen; Ngoc Hiep; Do Quang Minh
- Starring: Dustin Nguyen; Roger Yuan; Thanh Van Ngo; Thai Hoa; Nguyen Hoang Quan; Xuan Phat; Hieu Hien; Ngoc Diep
- Narrated by: Nguyen Hoang Quan
- Cinematography: Wych Kaosayananda
- Edited by: Vance Null
- Music by: Rajan Khanijaon
- Distributed by: BHD Co., Ltd (Vietnam); Grindstone Entertainment Group (USA); Lionsgate (USA)
- Release date: 22 August 2013
- Running time: 104 minutes
- Country: Vietnam
- Language: Vietnamese
- Budget: Over 1 million USD

Once Upon a Time in Vietnam (Vietnamese: Lửa Phật) is a 2013 Vietnamese action fantasy film directed by and starring Dustin Nguyen along with Roger Yuan. It was released on August 22, 2013. This is the first Vietnamese action fantasy film.

== Cast ==
- Dustin Nguyen as Dao
- Roger Yuan as Long
- Thanh Van Ngo as Anh
- Thai Hoa as Hien
- Nguyen Hoang Quan as Hung
- Ngoc Diep as Van
- Hieu Hien as Huy
- Phi Thanh Vân as Lan
- Xuan Phat as Mr. Tinh
- Jason Ninh Cao as General
- Bui Van Hai as Deserter
- My Le as Teacher
- Kieu Mai Ly as Neighbor
- Diem Trinh as Neighbor
- Quang Hieu as Monk
- Nguyen Hau as Man on truck
- Le Kham as Man on truck
