= Dustin Nguyen =

Vietnamese American actor

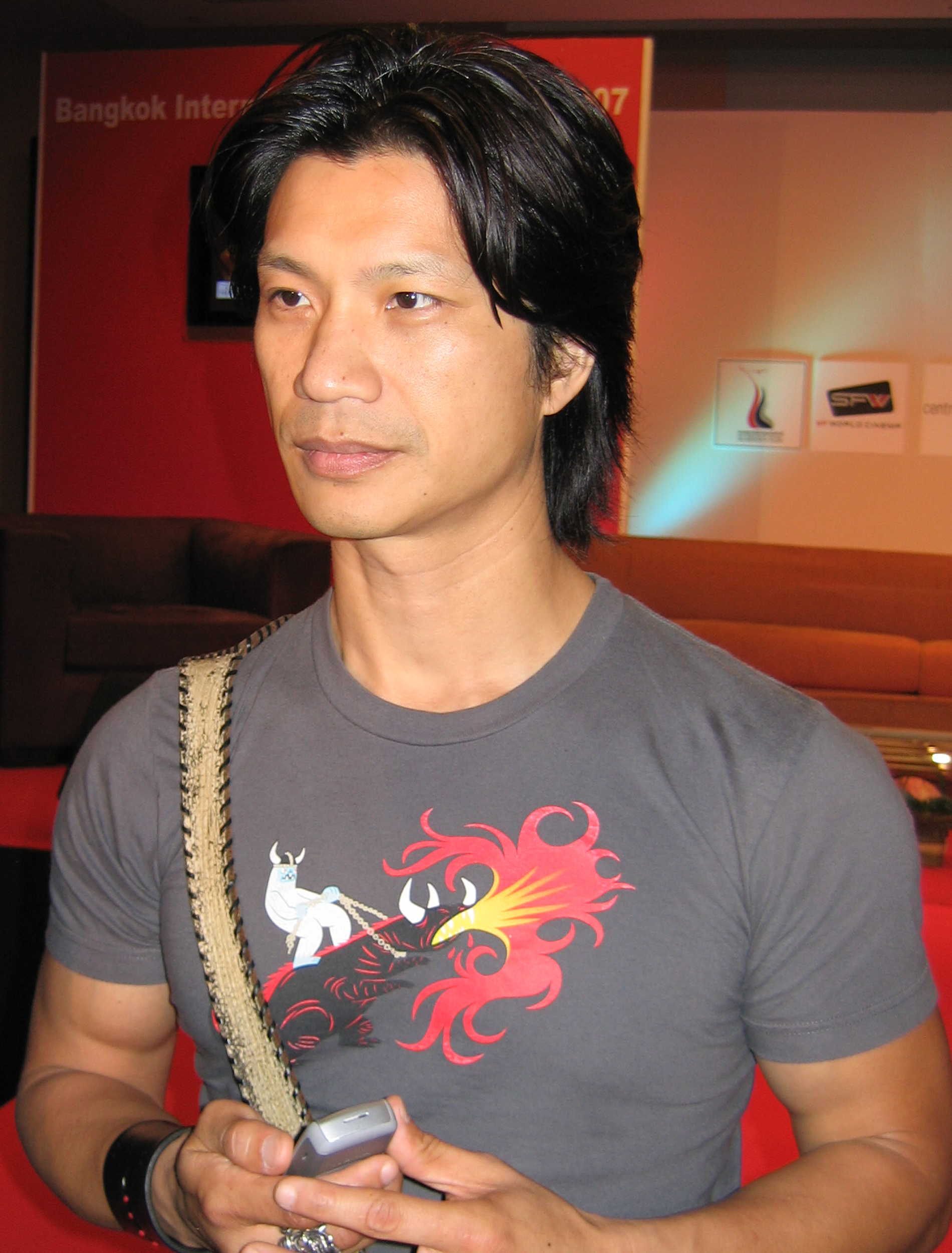
- Nguyen in 2007
- Born: Nguyễn Xuân Trí; September 17, 1962 (age 64); Saigon, South Vietnam
- Occupations: Actor; filmmaker; martial artist
- Years active: 1985–present
- Spouses: Angela Rockwood (m. 2001; div. 2012) Bebe Pham (m. 2012)
- Children: 4

Nguyễn Xuân Trí (born September 17, 1962), known professionally as Dustin Nguyen, is a Vietnamese-American actor and martial artist. He is best known for his roles as Harry Truman Aioki on 21 Jump Street and as Johnny Loh on V.I.P. He starred as Zing in the Cinemax/Max martial arts crime drama series Warrior. In film, he is known for starring in Little Fish, The Doom Generation and The Rebel.

== Early life ==
Nguyễn Xuân Trí was born on September 17, 1962, in Saigon, South Vietnam, and was one of two sons in his family. His mother, My Le, was an actress and dancer, and his father, Xuân Phát, was an actor, comedian, writer, and producer in Vietnam. The family left Vietnam in April 1975 during the fall of Saigon.

In his teens, his family arrived in Guam as refugees, and then the family was moved to a refugee camp in Fort Chaffee, Arkansas. Finally with the assistance of a Methodist church they relocated to Des Peres, Missouri, a suburb of St. Louis. The 21 Jump Street season 2 episode "Christmas in Saigon", which first aired in December 1987, is based in his experiences escaping Vietnam and eventually arriving in the United States; Nguyen also served as a technical advisor in the episode.

Nguyen graduated from Garden Grove High School in Garden Grove, California, he attended Orange Coast College and majored in communications but later dropped out to pursue acting full time.

Nguyen practices several martial arts including Muay Thai, Tae Kwon Do, Eskrima, and Jeet Kune Do.

== Career ==
Nguyen made his acting debut on Magnum, P.I., portraying a Cambodian freedom fighter in the episode "All For One." He was a series regular on both 21 Jump Street and VIP, and has guest-starred on a number of other series, including General Hospital, Highlander, and most notably seaQuest DSV, playing the role of Chief William Shan. Moreover, he had a cameo role in Charlie's Angels. Nguyen also auditioned for the role of Liu Kang in Mortal Kombat, but lost out to Robin Shou. In 1993 he played a Vietnamese man sent off to fight with the Viet Cong, in the film Heaven & Earth. In 2005, Nguyen starred as a former heroin addict opposite Academy Award-winner Cate Blanchett in the critically acclaimed Little Fish. He starred in the 2007 films The Rebel and Saigon Eclipse. In 2008 he starred in the Vietnamese martial art film Huyen Thoai Bat Tu (The Legend Is Alive, The Immortal Legend) where he plays a mentally disabled martial artist. Nguyen screened in 2009 the thriller The Gauntlet directed by Matt Eskandari; he stars with Chinese actress Bai Ling. He made a small cameo in 22 Jump Street as Vietnamese Jesus.

Nguyen continues to act and make films in Vietnam full-time. He made his feature directorial debut in the Vietnamese fantasy film Once Upon a Time in Vietnam, in which he also starred. He then starred in the Vietnamese film Gentle that premiered at the 2015 Busan International Film Festival where he received strong reception for his performance.

He was cast in Cinemax's Warrior in a recurring role before he officially joined the main cast in season two of the series.

Nguyen also was cast in The Accidental Getaway Driver which premiered at the 2023 Sundance Film Festival.

== Personal life ==
After a car accident late at night that occurred on September 3, 2001, on California's Interstate 5 Highway between San Francisco and Los Angeles during a Labor Day weekend which left his fiancée, Angela Rockwood, a paraplegic, Nguyen and Rockwood became active in The Christopher and Dana Reeve Paralysis Resource Center. The accident also claimed the life of Vietnamese actress Thuy Trang, a member of the original cast of Mighty Morphin Power Rangers as the original Yellow Ranger, Trini. He and Rockwood divorced in 2012.

Nguyen is based in Vietnam full-time. In 2012, he married Vietnamese actress-model Bebe Pham with whom he has four daughters.

He is fluent in English and Vietnamese.

== Filmography ==
=== Film ===
| Year | Title | Role | Notes |
|---|---|---|---|
| 1985 | Sunset Strip | Chinese Youth | |
| 1991 | Earth Angel | Peter | |
| 1992 | Rapid Fire | Paul Yang | |
| 1993 | No Escape, No Return | Tommy Cuff | |
| 1993 | Heaven & Earth | Sau | |
| 1994 | 3 Ninjas Kick Back | Glam | |
| 1994 | Vanishing Son II | Hung | |
| 1994 | Vanishing Son IV | Hung | |
| 1995 | Virtuosity | Suburban Reporter | |
| 1995 | The Doom Generation | Nguyen Coc Suc | |
| 1998 | Hundred Percent | Isaac | |
| 2005 | Little Fish | Jonny | |
| 2007 | Finishing the Game: The Search for a New Bruce Lee | Troy Poon | |
| 2007 | Saigon Eclipse | Kim | |
| 2007 | The Rebel | Sy | |
| 2009 | The Legend Is Alive | Long | |
| 2010 | Fool for Love | Dung | |
| 2010 | Floating Lives | Vo | |
| 2011 | The Gauntlet | Jin-Soo | |
| 2011 | Popular Dysfunctions | Comandante Chitt | |
| 2013 | Once Upon a Time in Vietnam | Dao | Also director |
| 2014 | 22 Jump Street | Vietnamese Jesus/Harry Truman Ioki | |
| 2015 | The Man with the Iron Fists 2 | Li Kung | |
| 2015 | Jackpot | Tu Nghia | Also director |
| 2015 | Zero Tolerance | Johnny | |
| 2015 | Gentle | Thien | |
| 2016 | I'll Wait | | Director |
| 2017 | Voodoo Doll | Hung | |
| 2022 | Blade of the 47 Ronin | Lord Nikko | |
| 2023 | The Accidental Getaway Driver | Tây | |
| 2026 | Double Couple Trouble | Tri | |

=== Television ===
| Year | Title | Role | Notes/Ref. |
|---|---|---|---|
| 1985 | General Hospital | Suki | |
| 1985 | Magnum, P.I. | Joe | 2 episodes |
| 1986 | The A-Team | Bobby | Episode: "Point of No Return" |
| 1987 | Shell Game | Doug | Episode: "Pai Gow" |
| 1987–1990 | 21 Jump Street | Officer Harry Truman Ioki | Main role; 82 episodes |
| 1989 | Danger Bay | Duk Chin | Episode: "Open Book" |
| 1992 | The Commish | Robert Hue | Episode: "Charlie Don't Surf" |
| 1992 | Street Justice | Yin Pham | Episode: "Bad Choices" |
| 1992 | Highlander | Chu Lin | Episode: "The Road Not Taken" |
| 1993 | Murder, She Wrote | David Kuan | Episode: "A Death in Hong Kong" |
| 1993 | Highlander | Jimmy Sang | Episode: "Revenge of the Sword" |
| 1993 | SeaQuest DSV | Chief William Shan | 4 episodes |
| 1994–1996 | Phantom 2040 | Tranh | 5 episodes |
| 1995 | Vanishing Son | Hung | Episode: "Single Flame" |
| 1995 | VR.5 | Ky Buchanan | Episode: "Simon's Choice" |
| 1995 | Kung Fu: The Legend Continues | Lo Gee | Episode: "Flying Fists of Fury II" |
| 1997 | Die Gang | Marc Wiessner | Main role; 13 episodes |
| 1999–2002 | VIP | Johnny Loh | Main role; 62 episodes |
| 2003 | JAG | Lt. Bao Hien | Episode: "Fortunate Son" |
| 2009 | The Unit | Transit Officer | Episode: "Chaos Theory" |
| 2011 | Gordon's Great Escape | Guest | Episode 2.2: "Vietnam" |
| 2012 | The Amazing Race Vietnam | Host | 13 episodes |
| 2018 | This Is Us | Bao | Episode: "Sometimes" |
| 2019–2023 | Warrior | Zing | 14 episodes |
| 2025 | Dope Thief | Son Pham | 7 episodes |

=== Producer ===
- A Tourist's Guide to Love (2023)– Consulting Producer
- The Amazing Race Vietnam 2012 (2012) – Himself
- CinemAbility (2011) (filming) – Himself
- 2007 AZN Asian Excellence Awards (2007) – Himself
- The Slanted Screen (2006) – Himself
- E! True Hollywood Story – Himself (1 episode, 2004)
- Howard Stern – Himself (4 episodes, 1999)
- The Howard Stern Radio Show – Himself (2 episodes, 1999)
- Intimate Portrait – Himself (1 episode)

== Awards ==
In March 2009, Nguyen won the Vietnamese Cánh Diều Vàng (Golden Kite Award) for best actor, for his starring role in the Phuoc Sang Films vehicle Huyền Thoại Bất Tử (The Legend Is Alive). For the same role, that year he won a Golden Lotus Award (Vietnam's Oscar) for Best Actor. He also won China's Golden Rooster Award for Best International Actor at China's Golden Rooster and Thousand Flowers International Film Festival 2009.

In 2015, at the Milan International Film Festival, Dustin won the Leonardo da Vinci Golden Horse Award for Best Supporting Actor in the Vietnamese film Gentle; an adaptation of Fyodor Dostoevsky's A Gentle Creature.
