= Lan và Điệp =

Lan và Điệp (Lan and Điệp) is a form of Vietnamese folk song. It is a cai luong song with a Romeo and Juliet type plot about starcrossed lovers which originated in the 1930s. In the song the girl's name is typically Lan and the boy's name is Điệp. Unlike the typical vong co song which is a solo song of separation from a loved one, the Lan and Diep song is either a duet or a response song.

== Original Literature ==
The story was first introduced in 1933 through the novel Tắt lửa lòng (translated as "Extinguishing the Heart's Flame") by the writer Nguyễn Công Hoan. It tells the tale of a romantic and tumultuous love affair between a girl named Lan and a boy named Điệp. Due to the manipulation of a local official, Điệp, a poor student, is forced to betray his fiancée Lan in order to marry Thúy Liễu, the daughter of the official. Heartbroken, Lan leaves her home and goes to a temple to shave her head and become a nun. The climax of the story occurs when Điệp finds the temple where Lan is staying, only to arrive at the moment where she takes her last breath.

“Tắt lửa lòng” quickly captured the public's attention and was adapted by artists into various forms.
