= The Amazing Race Vietnam =

Vietnamese adventure reality game show

- Vietnamese: Cuộc đua kỳ thú
- Genre: Reality competition
- Created by: Elise Doganieri; Bertram van Munster
- Based on: The Amazing Race by: Bertram van Munster; Elise Doganieri
- Presented by: Dustin Nguyen (2012); Huy Khánh (2013–2014, 2016); Phan Anh (2015); Song Luân (2019); Hương Giang (2019)
- Theme music composer: John M. Keane
- Country of origin: Vietnam
- Original language: Vietnamese

Production
- Production company: BHD

Original release
- Network: VTV3, VTV6
- Release: May 18, 2012 – September 7, 2019

Related
- International versions

The Amazing Race Vietnam: Cuộc đua kỳ thú is a Vietnamese reality competition show based on the American series The Amazing Race. Following the premise of other versions in the Amazing Race franchise, the show follows teams of two as they race across Vietnam and around the world. Each season is split into legs, with teams tasked to deduce clues, navigate themselves in foreign areas, interact with locals, perform physical and mental challenges, and travel by air, boat, car, taxi, and other modes of transport. Teams are progressively eliminated at the end of most legs for being the last to arrive at designated Pit Stops. The first team to arrive at the Finish Line wins a grand prize of 300,000,000₫.

The show premiered on May 18, 2012, and aired regularly during Friday primetime on VTV3. For the first season, Dustin Nguyen hosted, executive-produced and directed the show. The second season was announced to be a "celebrity season" with Huy Khánh, who served as host until the fifth season with the exception of the fourth season when Phan Anh served as host, chosen to replace Dustin Nguyen. Since Season 2, the show has primarily featured celebrity contestants.

In 2019, the show returned after a three-year hiatus with Song Luân as the host.

== The Race ==
The Amazing Race Vietnam is a reality television competition between teams of two in a race around Vietnam. Each season is divided into a number of legs wherein teams travel and complete various tasks to obtain clues to help them progress to a Pit Stop where they are given a chance to rest and recover before starting the next leg. The first team to arrive at a Pit Stop is often awarded a prize while the last team is normally eliminated (except in non-elimination legs). The final leg is usually run by the last three remaining teams, and the first to arrive at the final destination wins 300,000,000₫.

=== Teams ===
Each team is composed of two individuals who have some type of relationship to each other.

=== Route Markers ===
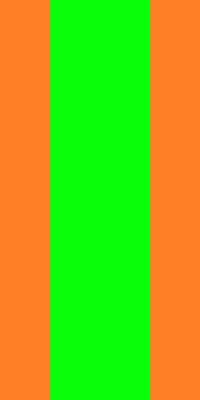

Route Markers are orange and light green flags that mark the places where teams must go. Most Route Markers are attached to the boxes that contain clue envelopes, but some may mark the place where the teams must go in order to complete tasks, or may be used to line a course that the teams must follow.

=== Clues ===
Clues are found throughout the legs in sealed envelopes, normally inside clue boxes. They give teams the information they need and tasks they need to do in order for them to progress through the legs.

- Lộ trình (Route Info): A general clue that may include a task to be completed by the team before they can receive their next clue.
- Lựa chọn kép (Detour): A choice of two tasks. Teams are free to choose either task or swap tasks if they find one option too difficult.
- Vượt rào (Roadblock): A task only one team member can complete. Teams must choose which member will complete the task based on a brief clue about the task before fully revealing the details of the task.
- Nhảy cóc (Fast Forward): A task that only one team may complete, allowing that team to skip all remaining tasks and head directly for the next Pit Stop. Teams may only claim one Fast Forward during the entire season.

=== Obstacles ===
Teams may encounter the following that may affect their position during the legs:

- Rào cản (U-Turn): The U-Turn is an obstacle where a team can force another trailing team to complete the other option of the Detour they did not select. Teams may only use their ability to U-Turn another team once throughout the season.

=== Legs ===
At the beginning of each leg, teams receive an allowance of cash to cover expenses.

Teams then have to follow clues and Route Markers that will lead them to the various destinations and tasks they will face. Modes of travel between these destinations include commercial and chartered airplanes, boats, trains, taxis, buses, and rented vehicles provided by the show, or the teams may simply travel by foot. Each leg ends with a Pit Stop (Về đích) where teams are able to rest and where teams that arrive last are progressively eliminated from until only three remain.

- Thẻ Ưu Tiên (Express Pass): This is awarded to the winners of the first leg of the season and allows that team to skip any task they want. In Season 6, the Express Pass, in addition to allowing a team to skip a task, also gave them the power to save a team from elimination, much like the Salvage Pass.

==== Non-elimination Legs ====
A non-elimination leg is when the last team to arrive at the Pit Stop is not eliminated and is allowed to continue racing. The team that is saved from elimination is typically given a penalty for the next leg.

- Marked for Elimination: A team that is "Marked for Elimination" has to finish first on the subsequent leg, otherwise they will be given a penalty. This penalty has appeared on the first five seasons. The penalty is usually thirty-minutes; however, on Season 4 the penalty increased to forty-five minutes in two instances.
  - Marked for Losing Money: Season 1 also featured a variant on the "marked for elimination" penalty. If they did not arrive first on the next leg, they were then forced to relinquish all of their money. In addition, they would not be allotted any money for the following leg and would not be allowed to collect money until the leg started for them.
- Stripped of Money: Starting in Season 2, one penalty non-elimination teams faced was that they were forced to surrender all of the money they had in their possession. In addition, they would not be allotted any money for the following leg and would not be allowed to collect money until the leg started for them.
  - Stripped of Money & Vehicles: Season 6 featured a variation of the money surrendering penalty in that the teams affected would not have any money or provided vehicles during the next leg.
- Delayed Start: Season 2 also included a one-time instance in which the team saved from elimination had to wait out a thirty-minute penalty at the start of the leg. This penalty returned in Season 6 and was increased to ninety minutes.
- Game phụ (Speed Bump): During Season 5, the Speed Bump was incorporated as a new non-elimination penalty. The Speed Bump is a task that only the team that was saved from elimination on the previous leg had to complete before continuing to race.

== Rules and penalties ==
Most of the rules and penalties are adopted from the American edition; but in some cases, this version has been seen to have a unique set of additional rules.

=== Penalties ===
- If teams take the wrong form of transportation, teams were issued a 15-minute penalty.
- Teams must obtain all of the clues during a leg and have all of their clues by the end of a leg; unlike the American version, teams were issued a five-minute penalty for every clue they missed. If teams lose a clue, they have the option of either looking serve a 30-minute penalty. As seen in the third season, the team who found their clue may pass it to the team who lost it, but doing so would result in a penalty.
- Teams are required to obey local traffic laws even if they are being driven. If a taxi driver commits a traffic infraction, teams must abandon the taxi immediately; failure to do so results in a 10-minute penalty.

== Seasons ==
Season	Broadcast		Winners	Teams	Host
Season	Period	Episodes	Winners	Teams	Host
1	May 18, 2012 – August 10, 2012	13	Saettie Baggio & Thành Phúc	10	Dustin Nguyen
2	July 26, 2013 – October 18, 2013	12	Trần Thị Thu Hiền & Diệp Lâm Anh	9	Huy Khánh
3	June 21, 2014 – August 31, 2014	22	Hương Giang & Criss Lai	9	Huy Khánh
4	July 17, 2015 – September 25, 2015	11	Trần Ngọc Anh & Đỗ Nhật Anh	8	Phan Anh
5	March 31, 2016 – June 9, 2016	11	Đinh Tiến Đạt & Lincoln Thúc Lĩnh	10	Huy Khánh
6	July 6, 2019 – September 7, 2019	10	Đặng Thị Lệ Hằng & H'Hen Niê	10	Song Luân; Hương Giang

== Countries and locales visited ==
As of 2019, The Amazing Race Vietnam has visited 4 municipalities and 30 provinces in Vietnam, in addition to 6 foreign countries in 2 continents.

=== Vietnam ===
Rank	Province	Season visited	Pit Stops
1	Ho Chi Minh City	6 (1, 2, 3, 4, 5, 6)	8^{1}
2	Hanoi	4 (1, 2, 3, 4)	4^{2}
2	Khánh Hòa	4 (1, 2, 3, 4)	4
4	Da Nang	3 (1, 2, 4)	3
4	Đồng Nai	3 (1, 2, 5)	0
4	Lâm Đồng	3 (1, 4, 6)	3
4	Quảng Nam	3 (1, 2, 4)	1
4	Quảng Ninh	3 (3, 4, 6)	3
4	Thừa Thiên Huế	3 (1, 3, 5)	3
10	Bình Thuận	2 (1, 2)	2
10	Hà Giang	2 (4, 6)	3
10	Kiên Giang	2 (1, 6)	1^{2}
10	Lào Cai	2 (2, 5)	2
10	Nghệ An	2 (3, 4)	2
10	Phú Yên	2 (5, 6)	2
10	Quảng Bình	2 (2, 6)	3
15	Bà Rịa-Vũng Tàu	1 (5)	2
15	Bình Dương	1 (1)	0
15	Cà Mau	1 (2)	1
15	Cao Bằng	1 (4)	1
15	Đắk Lắk	1 (2)	0
15	Đắk Nông	1 (2)	1
15	Điện Biên	1 (3)	1
15	Đồng Tháp	1 (3)	1
15	Hà Nam	1 (5)	0
15	Hai Phong	1 (2)	1
15	Hòa Bình	1 (1)	1
15	Kon Tum	1 (6)	1
15	Nam Định	1 (5)	1
15	Ninh Bình	1 (1)	2
15	Ninh Thuận	1 (3)	1
15	Quảng Ngãi	1 (4)	1
15	Tây Ninh	1 (4)	0
15	Yên Bái	1 (5)	2

=== International ===
Rank	Country	Continent	Season visited	Pit Stops
1	Australia	Oceania	1 (5)	1
1	China	Asia	1 (6)	0
1	Laos	Asia	1 (4)	1
1	North Korea	Asia	1 (6)	1
1	Singapore	Asia	1 (2)	1
1	South Korea	Asia	1 (3)	2

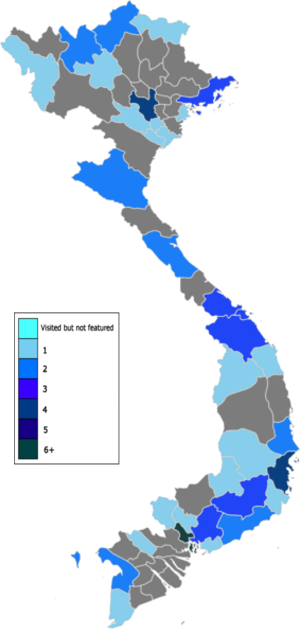
Provinces and municipalities visited by The Amazing Race Vietnam.

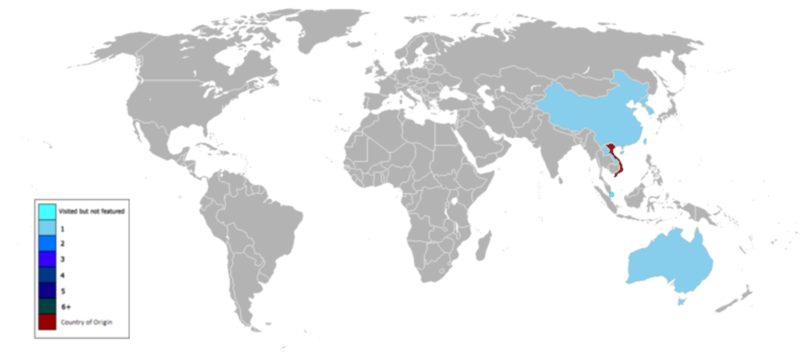
Countries visited by The Amazing Race Vietnam as of Season 6.

== Notes ==
1. Includes 4 Finish Lines.
2. Includes 1 Finish Line.
