= Cầu khỉ =

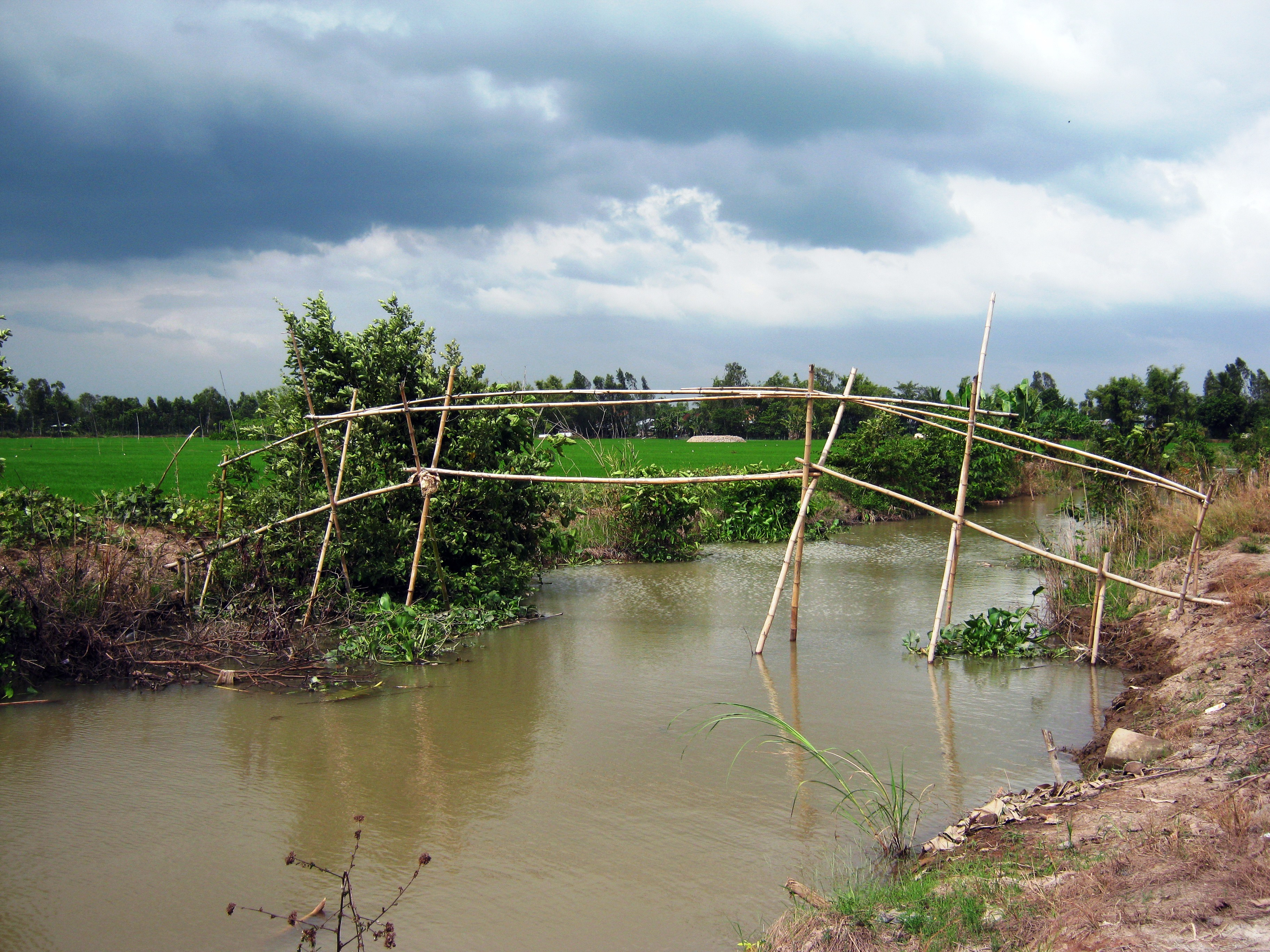
Cầu tre – bamboo bridge

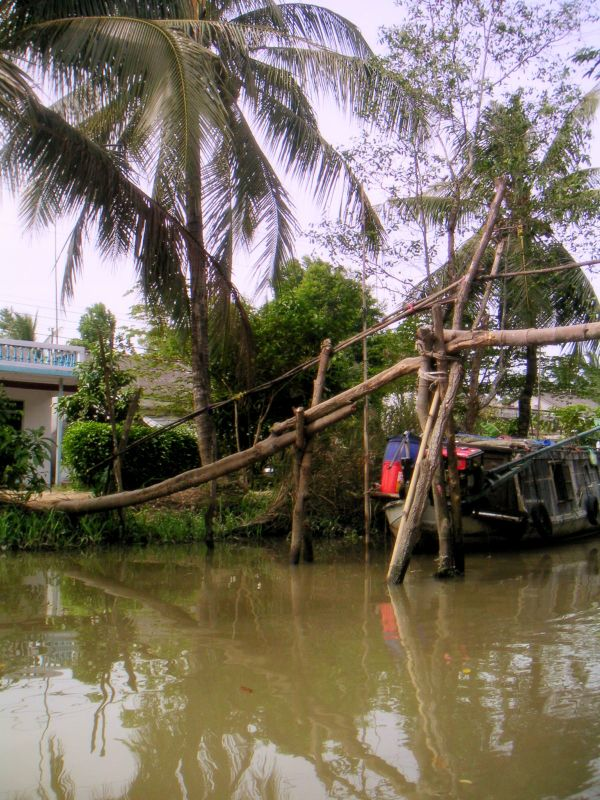
Cầu khỉ – monkey bridge

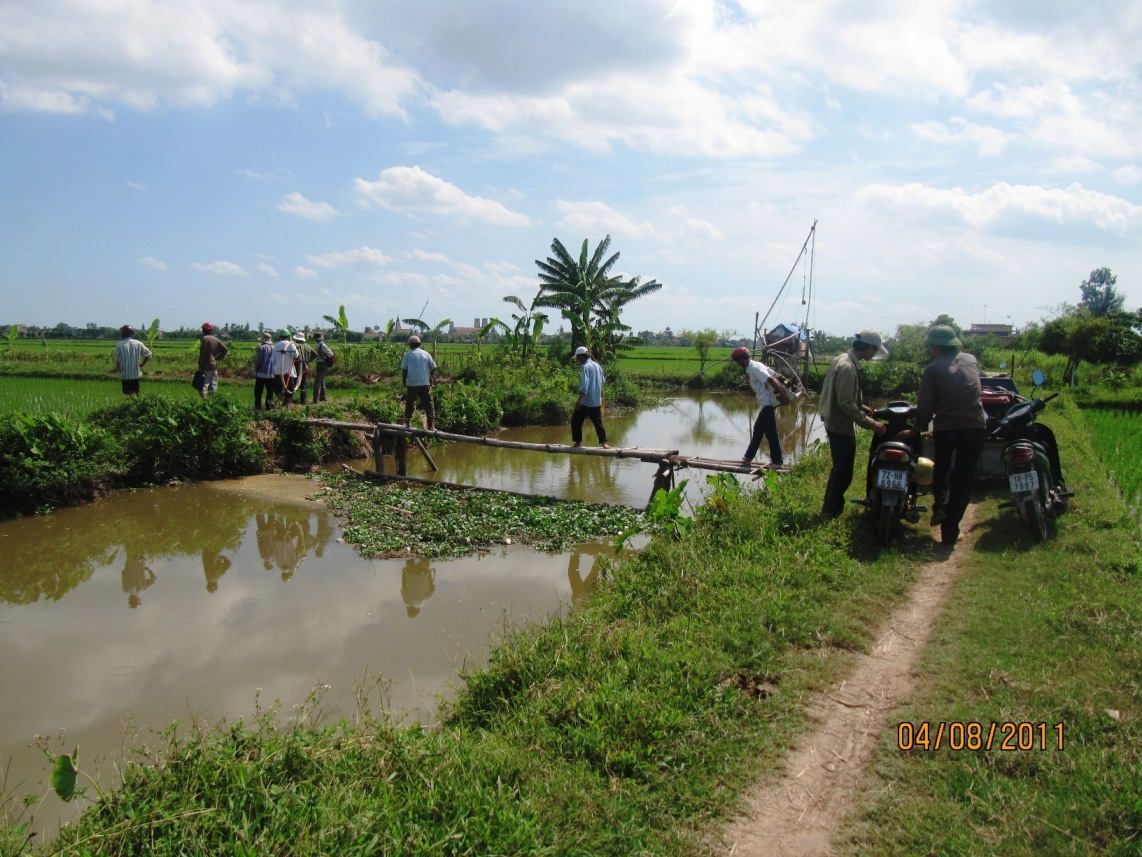
Cầu khỉ in Nam Định province

A cầu khỉ ("monkey bridge") in Vietnam is a handmade bamboo or wooden passway across a stream or gully. The "monkey bridge", as a uniquely Vietnamese traditional symbol, was the inspiration for the title of American author Lan Cao's novel Monkey Bridge.

It is also called a coconut bridge (if made of coconut tree) or bamboo bridge (if made of bamboo). These bridges, with or without handrails, are very difficult and dangerous for those who are not accustomed to them. Those familiar with them have been known to carry on their shoulder 20–50 kg while on the bridge.

== Distribution ==
This type of bridge is also very popular in the Mekong Delta, because there is a system of streams. In coastal areas of the Red River Delta in northern Vietnam, such as Giao Thủy, Hải Hậu, ... (Nam Định Province) or Tiền Hải (Thái Bình Province) there are also footbridges, mainly for passersby to take care of rice in the fields. Before 1960, footbridges were also very popular in northern Vietnam. They would naturally follow the path of foot traffic, the bridges wading out of the water stream.

== Competition on passing Cầu khỉ ==
Cầu khỉ are one of the old cultural signs in Vietnam. Now in industrialized regions sometimes there is a "Competition on passing Cầu khỉ by bicycle" for remembering the taste of footbridges.

Such a competition took place in Cửa Lò town, Nghệ An Province in March 2016. and in Bến Tre Province in 2017.
