= Violetta J'Adore =

Greek Cypriot drag artist and singer-songwriter

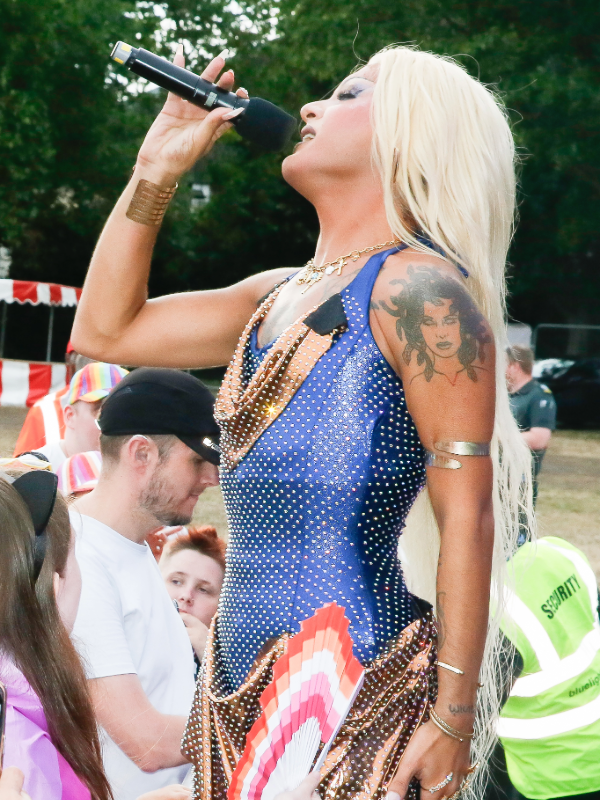
- J'Adore performing at Croydon PrideFest 2025
- Born: Vasilis Theodoros Kyriakou; 19 December 1996 (age 29); Limassol, Cyprus
- Occupations: Drag artist, singer-songwriter, model
- Years active: 2017–present
- Website: violettajadore.co.uk

Violetta J'Adore (legal name Vasilis Theodoros Kyriakou; born 19 December 1996) is a Greek Cypriot drag artist, singer-songwriter, and model based in London, United Kingdom. She is known for drag performance, original music releases, and work across LGBTQ+ entertainment in the United Kingdom and Europe. Her work combines pop and electronic music with Mediterranean and Greek Cypriot cultural influences. Her debut studio album, GODDEX, was released in 2026.

== Career ==
=== Drag performance ===
Violetta J'Adore began her drag career in 2017 while living in Chueca, Madrid, where she was introduced to drag culture during her participation in the Erasmus+ programme. She later performed in Athens before relocating to the United Kingdom, where she became active within the Brighton and London drag scenes.

During the COVID-19 pandemic, she participated in the first Greek Online Drag Fest, a nationwide digital event supporting drag performers in Greece. In September 2021, she competed in the Miss Hellas Drag Pageant in Athens, a drag pageant organised by the Greek drag artist Doukissa and judged by fashion designer Lakis Gavalas, dancer Marios Miltiadou, and model and performer Reject.

In 2022, Violetta J'Adore performed at Cyprus Pride. She performed a duet with Katerina Stikoudi on the main stage.

In March 2023, she was selected to represent the United Kingdom and Greece in the first European final of Miss Continental, the Queen of the North Continental pageant, part of the Continental Pageantry System founded by Jim Flint. The pageant took place in Rotterdam, Netherlands, on 10 June 2023.

Violetta has been described as an "international drag queen talent" by QX Magazine, as "popular across the scene" by Gay London Life, and as "a drag artist who's on the rise" by the same publication. Her events were included in Gay London Life selections of LGBTQ+ cabaret events for October, November, and December 2023.

From 2024 onwards, Violetta expanded her work as a live-singing drag performer, appearing at Pride and music events in the United Kingdom and Europe. A Croydon PrideFest 2025 profile stated that she had performed at EuroPride and opened for Chappell Roan. BabyStep Magazine described her as part of a generation of drag artists turning performance into a cross-border cultural statement, citing her appearances in Madrid, international drag pageants, and Pride stages across Europe.

=== Music career ===
Violetta J'Adore began releasing original music in 2024. Her debut single, "Rule the Night", was released in May 2024, followed by a live version on 29 September 2024. In November 2024, she released the ballad "My Everywhere".

In May 2025, Violetta released "Wave", a summer-themed single incorporating pop and dance influences. MusicOTFuture reviewed the track, describing its instrumental build and dance-oriented vocal performance.

On 1 August 2025, she released "Giasemin", a single inspired by Greek Cypriot traditional music. QX Magazine described the track as a reimagining of a traditional song and reported that it was connected to J'Adore's Cypriot heritage. The song was produced by Snob Artist with assistance from Raw Bee Candles, and mixed and mastered by Kieran Armitage. J'Adore debuted the song live at Croydon PrideFest, where she performed in Greek to a UK audience.

=== GODDEX and charting ===
On 13 March 2026, Violetta J'Adore released her debut studio album, GODDEX. The album includes nine tracks and incorporates art pop, electronic, and club music influences. MusicOTFuture reviewed the album in April 2026, describing it as a club-oriented art pop record with electronic beats.

Following the release of GODDEX, the songs "Yiámas!" and "Home" appeared on the Cypriot Music charts. On the Monthly Cypriot Chart for April 2026, "Yiámas!" placed at number 10 among the most streamed Cypriot songs in Cyprus, while "Home" placed at number 25. Cypriot Music also reported that J'Adore became the first drag artist to appear on the Cypriot charts and the first drag artist to debut with two songs on the chart.

In May 2026, Cypriot Music reported that six Cypriot songs appeared on the chart simultaneously for the first time in the publication's history, including a song by Violetta J'Adore alongside entries by Marianna Papamakariou, Antigoni, Anna Vissi, DJ Pietro, and Michalis Hadjimichael.

== Personal life ==
Vasilis Theodoros Kyriakou was born in Limassol, Cyprus. He has lived and performed in several European cities, including Madrid, Athens, Brighton, and London. Violetta has stated in interviews that she is married and that her partner has been supportive of her career. She has also studied psychology.

Violetta is a member of the Haus of Duchess drag house. Her drag mother is Doukissa, and her drag sister is Tammy Tsanaka.

== Awards and nominations ==
| Year | Award | Category | Result | Ref. |
|---|---|---|---|---|
| 2024 to 2025 | Prestige Awards | LGBTQI Entertainer of the Year, London and South East England | Won | |
| 2025 to 2026 | Prestige Awards | LGBTQI Entertainer of the Year, London and South East England | Won | |

== Discography ==
=== Studio albums ===
- GODDEX (2026)

=== Singles ===
- "Rule the Night" (2024)
- "Rule the Night (Live)" (2024)
- "My Everywhere" (2024)
- "Wave" (2025)
- "Giasemin" (2025)
- "J'ADORE" (2026)
