= Miss México Pageant =

A number of beauty pageants may be known as variants of Miss México, including:

- Mexicana Universal (1994 – present), feeder pageant to Miss Grand International, Miss International, Reina Hispanoamericana, and Miss Orb International
- Miss Earth Mexico (2002 – present), feeder pageant to Miss Earth, Miss Intercontinental, Miss Eco International, and Miss Globe
- Mr Model Mexico (2010 – present), feeder pageant to Mister International, Mister Global, and Manhunt International
- Miss México Organization (2013 – present), feeder pageant to Miss World, Miss Supranational, Miss Cosmo, Top Model of the World, Reina Internacional del Café, and Miss Elite World
- Miss Trans México (2015 – present), trans beauty pageant
- Mister México (2016 – present), feeder pageant to Mister World and Mister Supranational
- Miss Universe Mexico (2024 – present) feeder pageant to Miss Universe
- Señorita México (1952—2003), former feeder pageant to Miss Universe, Miss World, and Miss International
