= Alexandra Billings =

American actor (born 1962)

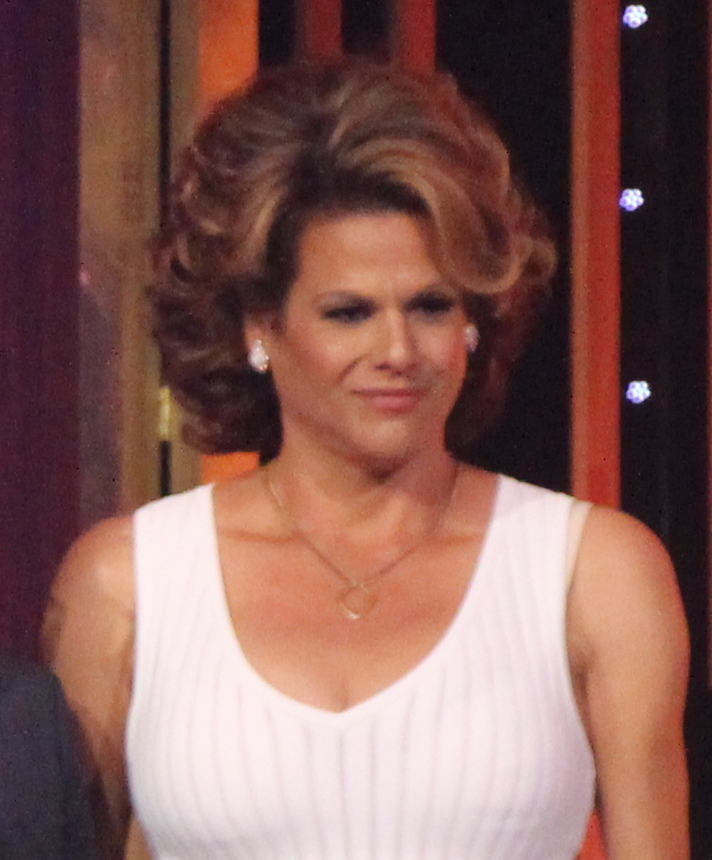
- Billings in 2016
- Born: March 28, 1962 (age 64); Schaumburg, Illinois, U.S.
- Occupations: Actress, singer
- Years active: 2002–present
- Partner: Chrisanne Blankenship (m. 1995)

Alexandra Scott Billings (born March 28, 1962) is an American actress and singer. A trans woman, Billings played one of TV's first openly transgender characters in the 2005 film Romy and Michele: In the Beginning. She is also known for portraying the recurring character Davina in the Amazon series Transparent and has played transgender characters in ER, Eli Stone, How to Get Away with Murder, Grey's Anatomy and The Conners.

== Early life ==
Billings was born in Illinois into a multiracial family; she is of European American, African American, and Native American ancestry. Billings's father, Robert Billings, was a music teacher at Los Angeles Harbor College and the musical director for the Los Angeles Civic Light Opera, which influenced her interest in theater. She assisted, working backstage with Carol Burnett and Yul Brynner. She also appeared in Jesus Christ Superstar and The Roar of the Greasepaint—the Smell of the Crowd. In her early adult life, Billings struggled with homelessness and cocaine and opioid addiction, and for a time participated in sex work.

== Career ==
=== Stage work ===
In the early 1980s, Billings worked under the stage name Shanté at the famed Baton Show Lounge in Chicago, Illinois, where she impersonated Barbra Streisand, Judy Garland, and Liza Minnelli. Winning a series of beauty contests, she was named Miss Wisconsin, Miss New York, Miss Chicago, Miss Illinois, and Miss Florida. She also served as a judge of the Miss Continental pageant in 2000 and 2001.

Most of Billings' professional work has been in Chicago theaters, most notably The Bailiwick Theater, Light Opera Works, Court Theatre, and Steppenwolf Theatre. She has collaborated on plays with such notable authors as Larry Kramer, Tina Landau, and Jamie Pachino. She has received one Joseph Jefferson Award and five After Dark Awards for her work in Chicago Theatre. Her one-woman autobiographical show toured to Boston, Chicago, Los Angeles and off Broadway. She is a former artistic associate of About Face Theatre. She performed in a pair of Billy Bermingham-written satirical farces at the Torso Theatre during the 1990s titled Shannen Doherty Shoots a Porno: A Shockumentary and Cannibal Cheerleaders on Crack, starring in the latter.

Billings is also a professional singer who performs in theaters and nightclubs throughout the United States. She recorded her second CD, The Story Goes On, in 2003. She was a recipient of the New York MAC Hanson Award for Cabaret Artist of the Year in 2004.

Billings has appeared in an autobiographical show, "S/He and Me". In fall 2018, she also appeared in The Nap at Manhattan Theatre Club, and is one of the first openly trans people to be cast in a trans role on Broadway.

In September 2019, it was announced that Billings would play the role of Madame Morrible in the Broadway musical Wicked. She is the first openly transgender person to star in the show. After the closure of Broadway during the COVID-19 pandemic, Billings appeared with several other performers on Good Morning America in fall 2021 to announce the return of several shows to Broadway, including Wicked. Billings resumed performing the role of Morrible when Wicked reopened on Broadway in September 2021, and stayed in the show until January 30, 2022.

=== Television and film appearances ===
In 2009, Chicago PBS affiliate WTTW produced a documentary about Billings' life and career, entitled Schoolboy to Showgirl: The Alexandra Billings Story. It aired on WTTW and nationally on other PBS stations, and is often rebroadcast during Pride Month on various stations.

She has appeared in the 2005 made-for-TV movie Romy and Michelle: A New Beginning. She has also played transgender characters in episodes of Karen Sisco, ER, Eli Stone and Grey's Anatomy.

In 2010, Billings appeared in the film FAUX, in which she commented on gay marriage spurring the economy.

In 2015, Billings appeared on season two, episode six of How to Get Away with Murder as Professor Jill Hartford.

In 2017, transgender actors and actresses, including Billings, were part of a video open letter aimed at Hollywood producers, written by Jen Richards, asking for more and improved roles for transgender people.

In 2018, Billings played a recurring role as judge Martha Wallace in the second season of Goliath.

Billings received wider recognition for her role as Davina in the Amazon series Transparent. The character was introduced in an early episode of season one in 2014 as a transgender friend of a recently out trans woman, and appeared throughout the show's run, including in its feature-length finale, Musicale Finale.

From 2020, Billings appeared in a recurring role as Robin, a transgender supervisor at Wellman Plastics and mentor to Darlene Conner on ABC's The Conners.

She had a recurring role as Inspector Ainsley Lowbeer in the 2022 Amazon Prime Video science fiction series The Peripheral.

She appeared in the 2023 film Queen Tut, for which she received a Canadian Screen Award nomination for Best Lead Performance in a Comedy Film at the 12th Canadian Screen Awards in 2024.

=== Teaching ===
She has taught Viewpoints, a theater method, at the Steppenwolf Summer School. She also taught at Lewis University, The University of Chicago, University of Illinois, the Illinois Theatre Convention, Act One Studios, and classes and workshops around the Chicago area, as well as the Steppenwolf School West in Los Angeles California.

Billings is a theater professor at the University of Southern California in Los Angeles. Before working at USC, she was an assistant professor at California State University, Long Beach. She received her MFA from CSULB, and delivered the commencement speech for CSULB College of the Arts in 2015.

== Activism ==
Billings is an AIDS and LGBTQ activist and advocate for the equality of the LGBTQ community and has encouraged others to use their voices to create change within the LGBTQ community.

In 2016, Billings was awarded the Human Rights Campaign Visibility Award in recognition of outstanding members of the LGBTQ community who live openly and freely in the public eye. After receiving the award, Billings thanked the audience, but also said, "I look around and I see you all and I cannot tell you how grateful I am that you're here, and I have to say something to you – I think you look great, you look swell and it's wonderful that you're here eating the chicken – it's delightful, but I must tell you that we have to do something more than sit and speak and talk to our neighbors and eat great food and put on fancy clothes."

In 2017, Transparent won the GLAAD Media Award for Outstanding Comedy Series. When accepting the award on behalf of the cast, Billings urged the audience to talk to people who disagree with their beliefs in order to spark conversation and create change instead of staying complacent. Specifically, she called out the older LGBTQ generation and asks them to guide the younger LGBTQ generation because they will be the ones continuing the fight for equality in the future.

When delivering the commencement speech to the graduating class of the California State University, Long Beach in 2015, Billings once again emphasized the importance of voice when she told the students that it is their job is to speak loud, big, and wide in order to spread their voices.

== Personal life ==
Billings lives in Hollywood, California, with her wife Chrisanne, whom she initially met at age fourteen in drama class. They were married in a commitment ceremony in Chicago on December 4, 1995. Billings was chosen as the Grand Marshal for the Pride Parade in Chicago, Illinois on June 28, 2009.

Billings started her gender transition in 1980. She has been living with HIV since 1985, and has been an advocate for HIV health initiatives, as well as trans issues and trans rights. When talking about her fight to battle AIDS, she says that she believes the reason she has survived all these years is due to her wife's support. She has spoken about living with HIV in a number of interviews, including a 2016 article with her hometown paper. She also spoke to POZ magazine for a 2003 interview about life with HIV. In 2022, she published her memoir This Time for Me: A Memoir.

== Filmography ==
=== Film ===
Year	Title	Role	Notes
2007	Socket	Dr. Emily Andersen	
2009	Stealth	Veronica Terranova	Short film
2010	Faux	Herself	
2017	Valley of Bones	Kimberly	
2018	Freelancers Anonymous	Janey	
2019	Paddleton	Judy	
2020	Disclosure: Trans Lives on Screen	Herself	Documentary film
2023	Queen Tut	Malibu	Also executive producer

=== Television ===
Year	Title	Role	Notes
2003	Karen Sisco	Lois DiNardo	Episode: "Nobody's Perfect"
2005	ER	Ms. Mitchell	Episode: "Skin"
2005	Romy and Michele: In the Beginning	Donna	Television movie
2006	Grey's Anatomy	Donna Gibson	Episode: "Where the Boys Are"
2008	Eli Stone	Joanna	Episode: "Two Ministers"
2008	Pretty/Handsome	Christina Carpenter	Unsold TV pilot
2014–2019	Transparent	Davina Rejennae	24 episodes
2015	How to Get Away with Murder	Jill Hartford	Episode: "Two Birds, One Millstone"
2015	Capitol Hill	Herself	4 episodes
2016	Dish Nation	Herself	Episode 4.152
2018	Goliath	Martha Wallace	5 episodes
2020	Diary of a Future President	Joy	2 episodes
2020–2021	The Conners	Robin Shetsky	6 episodes
2021–2023	The Rookie	Sergeant Stella Porter	Episode: "Triple Duty"
2021–2023	Never Have I Ever	College Counsellor Jennifer Warner	8 episodes
2022	The Guardians of Justice	Alex	7 episodes
2022–2023	The Peripheral	Inspector Ainsley Lowbeer	3 episodes
2025	Lopez vs Lopez	Paula	Episode: "Lopez vs Josué"

=== Theatre ===
Year	Title	Role(s)	Notes
1990	Cannibal Cheerleaders on Crack	Natasha	Torso Theatre
1994	Shannen Doherty Shoots a Porno: A Shockumentary	Nazi prison matron	Torso Theatre
1997	Time To Burn	performer	Steppenwolf Theatre Company
1997	Space	performer	Steppenwolf Theatre Company
1998	The Berlin Circle	Translator/Cook's Assistant/Ursula	Steppenwolf Theatre Company
1998	Nora	Kristine Linde	Court Theatre
1999	Xena Live!	Xena	About Face Theatre
2001	Gypsy	Rose	Bailiwick Repertory
2004	A Dublin Bloom	Bella Cohen	Irish Repertory Theatre
2006	Seussical	Mayzie La Bird	Chicago Shakespeare Theater
2007	The Mystery of Edwin Drood	Princess Puffer	Sacred Fools Theater Company
2011	Louis Slotin Sonata	Woman	California Repertory Company
2018	The Nap	Waxy Bush	Samuel J. Friedman Theatre
2020; 2021–2022	Wicked	Madame Morrible	The Gershwin Theatre
