= Miss Trans México =

Mexican beauty pageant for transgender people

- Formation: 2015; 11 years ago
- Type: Beauty pageant
- Headquarters: Mexico City
- Location: Mexico
- Members: Miss International Queen; Miss Star International; Miss Trans International
- Official language: Spanish

Miss Trans México is a Mexican beauty pageant exclusively for transgender individuals, which has taken place annually since 2015. The goal of the contest is to promote trans and LGBT rights and equality and improve the overall quality of life for transgender persons, in Mexico.

== Titleholders ==
Year	Miss Trans Nacional México	1st Runner-up
2015	Miranda Mejía Cortines	Brenda Ascarraga
2016	Gisselle Valero Vázquez	Italia Navarrete
2017	Anahi Cristóbal Altuzar	Danna Samaniego
2018	Grecia Culpo Gutiérrez	Marisa Zenteno
2019	Valentina Fluchaire Mendoza	Ivanna Díaz
2021	Alejandra Jiménez Morales	Lineth Flores
2022	Ivanna Cázares Velasco	Ashley Vera
2023	Romina Amador Muñiz	Natalia Franco
2024	Alanna Cordero Santillán	Hanny Murillo
2025	Ximena Figueroa Hilton	Angie Lozano
Year	Miss International Queen Mexico	1st Runner-up
2026	Khloe Rios-Wyatt	No Replacement

=== Mexican Miss International Queen Winners ===
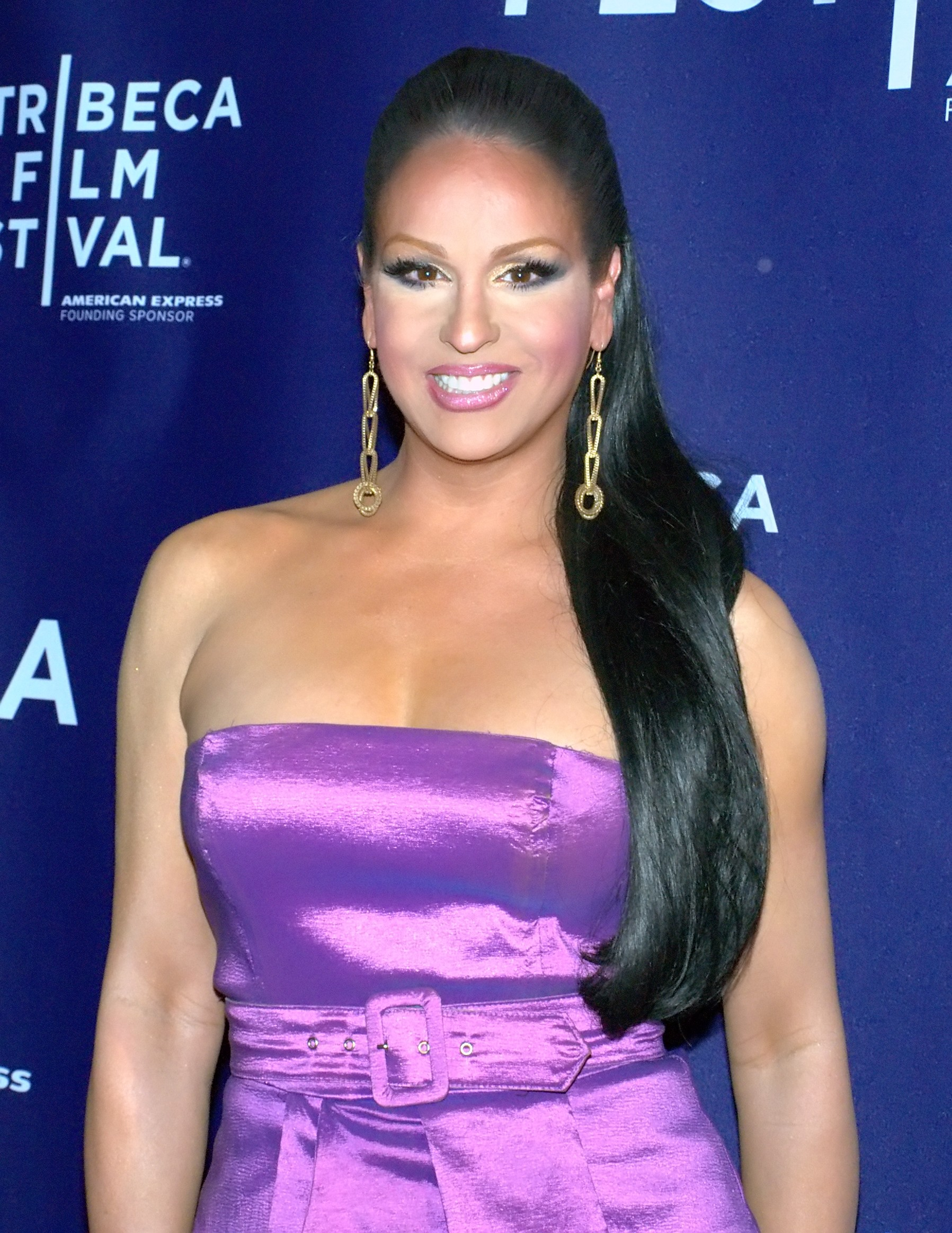
Miss Continental 2004 and Miss International Queen 2006
Erica Andrews

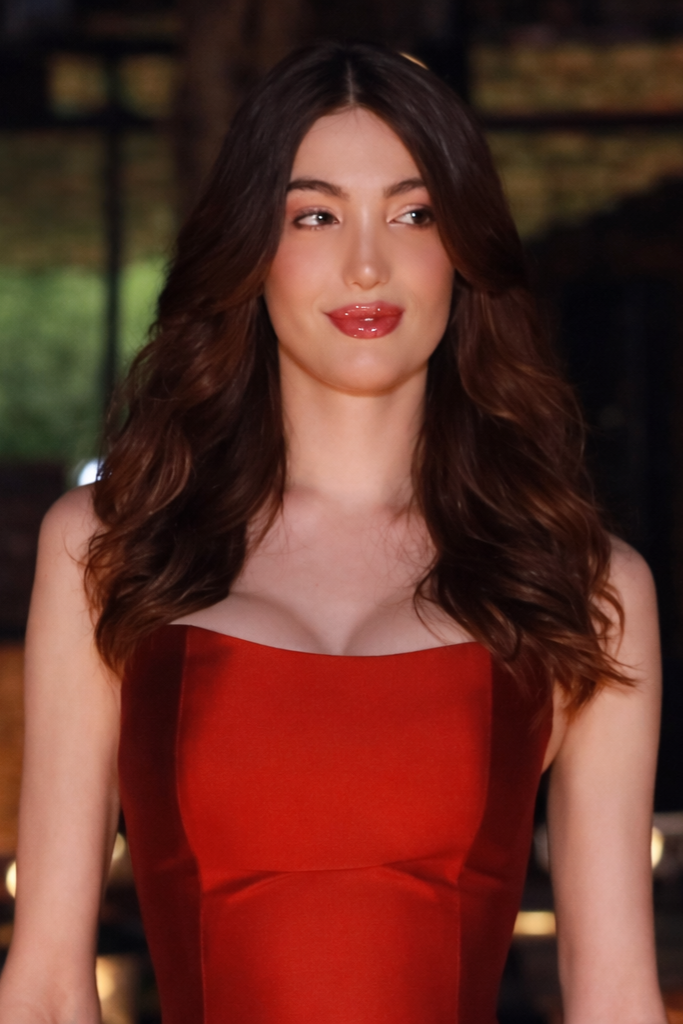
Miss Trans Nacional México 2019 and Miss International Queen 2020
Valentina Fluchaire

== Representatives at international pageants ==
The following trans queens have represented Mexico in international beauty pageants for transgender women, Miss International Queen, Miss Star International and Miss International Trans.

Color key

- : Declared as Winner
- : Ended as Runner-up or top 5/6 qualification
- : Ended as one of the Finalist/Semi-finalists

=== Miss International Queen ===
Year	Miss International Queen Mexico	State	Competition performance	
Year	Miss International Queen Mexico	State	Placements	Special award(s)
2026	Khloe Rios-Wyatt	Morelos	Unplaced	
2025	Alanna Cordero Santillán	Tabasco	Unplaced	
2024	Romina Amador Muñiz	Colima	Top 12	
2023	Ivanna Cázares Velasco	Colima	Top 6	
2022	Alejandra Jiménez Morales	Veracruz	Top 10	
2020	Valentina Fluchaire Mendoza	Colima	Miss International Queen 2020	Best in Evening Gown
2019	Grecia Culpo Gutiérrez	Durango	Unplaced	
2018	Anahi Cristobal Altuzar	Chiapas	Top 10	
2016	Gisselle Valero Vázquez	Mexico City	Top 12	Miss Popular Vote
2015	Miranda Mejía Cortines	Jalisco	Unplaced	
Did not compete between 2008–2014
2007	Sofia Montana Brown	Chihuahua	Unplaced	
2006	Erica Hutton Andrews	Nuevo León	Miss International Queen 2006	

=== Miss Star International ===
Year	Miss Star International Mexico	State	Competition performance	
Year	Miss Star International Mexico	State	Placements	Special award(s)
2025	Khloe Rios-Wyatt	Morelos	Miss Star International 2025	Best National Costume
2024	Aytana Román	Zacatecas	Top 6	Miss Top Model
2023	Madison Basrey	Jalisco	Top 10	
2022	Ivanna Díaz	Chihuahua	1st Runner-up	
Due to the impact of COVID-19 pandemic, no competition held between 2020 and 2021
2019	Anahi Cristobal Altuzar	Chiapas	Top 10	
2018	Marisa Zenteno	Chiapas	Top 10	

=== Miss International Trans ===
Year	Miss International Trans Mexico	State	Competition performance	
Year	Miss International Trans Mexico	State	Placements	Special award(s)
2025	Mitchell Lagunes	Veracruz	1st Runner-up	
2024	Dulce Palma	Sonora	Unplaced	
2023	Tiki Valenzuela	Sonora	Unplaced	
2022	Lineth Flores	Guerrero	Miss International Trans 2022	Miss Elegance

== See also ==
- Mr Gay Mexico
