= Chilli Pepper (entertainer) =

American entertainer

- Died: September 11, 2024; Chicago, Illinois, U.S.
- Other name: Bionic Woman
- Occupations: Female impersonator, entertainer, advocate

Chilli Pepper was an entertainer, female impersonator and trans woman who was known as a frequent talk show guest in the 1980s and was a HIV/AIDS awareness advocate. Pepper's name was added to the National LGBTQ Wall of Honor in 2025.

== Early life and career ==
As a teenager Pepper travelled from Santiago, Chile to Chicago, Illinois to win her first impersonation contest and later became a local celebrity in the 1970s from performing at the Baton Show Lounge. She won Miss Gay Chicago in 1974 and the first Miss Continental drag pageant in 1980.

In the 1980s and 1990s, Pepper went on to appear on such television talk shows as The Phil Donahue Show, The Jenny Jones Show, The Joan Rivers Show, The Jerry Springer Show and The Oprah Winfrey Show.

In 2017, in a Chicago Magazine interview, Pepper told writer Bill Zehme she was preferable to the term "female impersonator" over "drag queen."

On March 14, 2024, at the 35th GLAAD Media Awards Pepper and a talk show host Paolo Presta presented the GLAAD Vanguard Award to Oprah Winfrey.

== Death ==
Chilli Pepper died peacefully in her home Chicago on September 11, 2024, after having stage four cancer.
