= Ricki Lake (1993 talk show) =

American television talk show

- Created by: Garth Ancier; Gail Steinberg
- Directed by: Bob McKinnon
- Presented by: Ricki Lake
- Theme music composer: John Jellybean Benitez Ed Terry
- Country of origin: United States
- Original language: English
- No. of seasons: 11
- No. of episodes: Approximately 2,000

Production
- Running time: 45 to 60 minutes
- Production companies: The Garth Ancier Company; Sony Pictures Television (Note: Credited as Columbia Pictures Television Distribution (1993–1995) (seasons 1–2), Columbia TriStar Television Distribution (1995–2001) (seasons 2–9) and Columbia TriStar Domestic Television (2001–2002) (seasons 9–10))

Original release
- Network: Syndication
- Release: September 13, 1993 – May 21, 2004

Ricki Lake (Note: The show is sometimes referred to as The Ricki Lake Show.) is an American daytime talk show that was hosted by Ricki Lake. The show ran in syndication for eleven seasons from September 13, 1993, to May 21, 2004, in which it broadcast over 2,000 episodes. Taped at Chelsea Studios, the tabloid talk show primarily featured single-issue panel discussions with everyday people. Lake moderated these discussions, which often centered on relational transgressions between guests, and she placed a heavy emphasis on audience participation. The show distinguished itself from its contemporaries by focusing on youth-oriented discussions from a Generation X perspective.

== Format ==
Like other daytime talk shows of the era, Ricki Lake specialized in sensationalist topics involving invited guests and incorporated questions and comments from a studio audience. However, its target audience was younger than those of similar series, and it was seen as less sensational than its counterparts. It was taped at the Chelsea Studios in New York City. During an interview on A Spoonful of Paolo, Lake stated that she almost signed up to do the show for only $5,000.

Many episodes would surprise guests with a doorbell sound effect, revealing someone who knew or had learned about the main guest's intentions. Often, the primary guest would learn that someone from their life (such as a spouse they had cheated on) was hearing their on-stage confession. The doorbell and its associated surprises were a significant element of the series throughout its run.

== Production ==
=== Conception and development ===
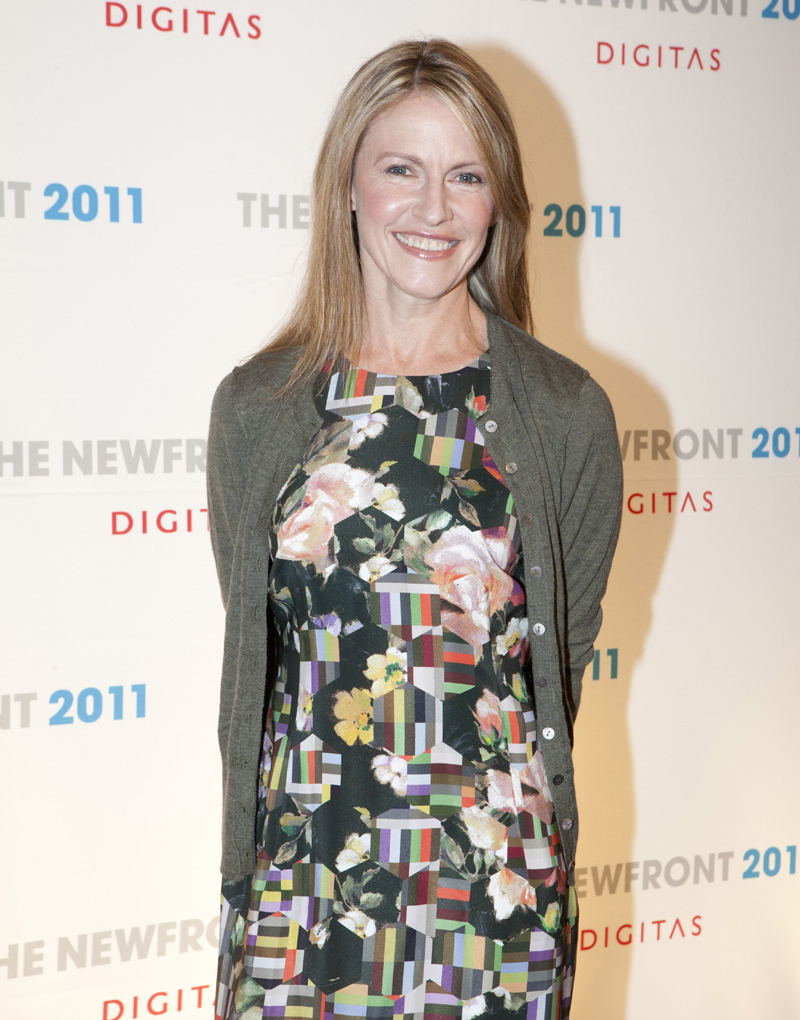
Jane Pratt's talk show was retooled into Ricki Lake.

In 1992, television producers Garth Ancier and Gail Steinberg conceived the idea of a talk show that targeted young adults. It materialized as Jane, a show hosted by Sassy editor Jane Pratt that focused on young and explicit topics. It received a 13-week trial run on WNYW; however, it was not renewed or picked up for syndication. Ancier claimed that Jane's production company, 20th Century Fox, liked the show's format although not Pratt as host. As a result, Ancier searched for a new host for the show. Over 100 women auditioned for the role and the finalists included Veronica Webb, Melissa Rivers, and Ricki Lake. According to Steinberg, producers wanted "someone who's young but someone who has enough of a world view to bring some understanding to a range of topics. When we met Ricki, we felt all of that immediately." Most of Jane's production staff was retained for Lake's show, which Ancier described as Jane with a new host.

=== Topic selection ===
The show primarily focused on relationships, which were discussed from a youth's perspective. According to Lake, "Where Oprah Winfrey would have a show like, 'My teen daughter is driving me crazy,' we'd do it as, 'My mom doesn't understand me.' That was really our hook." The show's premiere featured the topic "I'm Getting Married But I Haven't Met My Husband Yet". Lake attempted to distance the show from the tabloid talk show subgenre, stating, "It's not exploitative. It's not crude. It's not freaks."

The show occasionally featured live music performances and topics such as lie detectors and paternity tests.

Topics commonly discussed on the show included relationship issues, shoplifting, condoms, violence, drugs, and teen pregnancy. These discussions often focused on conflicts between the guests, with Lake claiming that "[t]he conflicts of real people are what people want to watch". In 2002, Michael Rourke replaced Steinberg as executive producer after she stepped down to develop new television programs for Columbia TriStar Domestic Television. The show experienced a content overhaul under Rourke, in which its focus shifted from conflict-driven topics to more mature discussions about relationships, sex, and women's success stories. Its topics were typically reflected through confrontational titles, such as "Back Off, Boys, I'm a Lesbian—You'll Never Have Me!" and "Yeah, I'm Only 13, But I’m Going to Have a Baby!"

During the series' run, its primary focus was on dealing with personal subjects like parenting skills (including single mothers who are accused of having the lack of experience of taking care of children), romantic relationships (both marital and non-marital), LGBT issues (like discrimination, same-sex couples who want to have children or straight people attracted to a person who is LGBT or the other way around), racism and prejudice (even within their own race and gender), interracial relationships, family discord, revealing secrets, and social topics of the day (like money, looking for work or being on welfare). At times she had lighter shows, ranging from contests (including female impersonators, beauticians, or those who want to prove to others that they do have talent), celebrity guests, and reunions, to granting viewers' personal wishes.

Lake's talk show sometimes covered serious topics, including domestic violence ("Bad Men, Desperate Woman"), homeless people who live in the NYC subway system ("The Catacomb People") and "Teens on Death Row". Lake also took on shows that dealt with women who were members of the Ku Klux Klan, and during a show involving marijuana, she learned that three guests were using the substance just moments before they walked on to the set to be interviewed by her.

One of Lake's most memorable and controversial confrontations happened during the first season, when she found herself dealing with Reverend Fred Phelps in a show that involved targeting anyone who carries the AIDS virus and why they deserve to die. (Phelps and his followers from Westboro Baptist Church in Topeka, Kansas had been picketing at funerals for AIDS victims across the United States, leading to several states to enact laws prohibiting or restricting groups from coming within a certain distance of the funerals.) When Phelps and his son-in-law tried to take over the set, a furious and insulted Lake ordered the Phelps family to leave the studio. During the commercial break, the two were forced off the set by the producers and escorted out of the building by security. After Phelps died on March 19, 2014, Lake tweeted on her Twitter page that when he was on the show he told her that she worshipped her rectum on camera, which led to Lake taking action off-stage to force Phelps off the show after that remark. The series also experienced controversy after an episode titled "I'm Angry Because People Think I'm Gay" was taped, in which the audience became "increasingly hostile" and made many "inappropriate remarks." The media monitoring organization GLAAD attempted to prevent the episode from airing.

=== Guest and audience recruitment ===
To recruit guests, the show posted notices in the middle of episodes—known as carts—which provided viewers with upcoming episode topics and the show's phone number. According to Steinberg, the show featured 12 to 14 guests per episode.

The show's audience primarily consisted of college-aged students and young women.

The methodology for securing guests on the show, common to many shows similar to it, was as such: Producers would brainstorm and come up with a show title or theme. During an aired episode of the program spots would run for shows in pre-production. The goal was to recruit persons who may have a situation in their life that fits with the proposed topic. Hotline messages would be screened and the most promising prospects would be contacted by a production assistant. The potential guest would be interviewed about their situation. Guests chosen to appear on the show were booked airfare to New York City, brought to the television studio and sent to specific "green rooms", inside which they were briefed in more detail on how the show would be taped. One of the producers then sat down with each guest to reiterate the story, including emphasis on various phrases or statements the guest might have made during pre-interviews. Guests were given an appearance and confidentiality contract to sign and installments were recorded in real-time, which took approximately 80 minutes to complete. Lake came into the audience for taped segments and, during the paused portion (where commercial breaks were inserted), she left the audience to consult with producers. The final show was aired approximately one month later. However, if the guest (or guests) lied to the producers prior to coming on air, they were forced off the set and their travel arrangements cancelled. This happened twice during the show's run, and both events aired.

== Broadcast history and release ==
Ricki Lake was syndicated worldwide. In the United States, it was initially distributed by Columbia Pictures Television Distribution and placed in first-run syndication on September 13, 1993.

The show was also popular in other countries, especially in the United Kingdom, where it aired on Channel 4, and was aired daily on ITV2, until 2009, as well as in Australia, where the show was screened on three channels: the Seven (1997–2002), Ten (1994–1997) and pay TV-exclusive W Channel (2002–2004). The show was also successful in the Netherlands, where it aired on SBS6. It was also shown in New Zealand on TVNZ. Even though it has been out of production since 2004, the show is still screened in various places around the world such as Nigeria and in the Middle East.

Garth Ancier and Gail Steinberg were the original executive producers. Michael Rourke moved into the executive producer role in 2002, during the 9th season, with Michelle Mazur, a former producer in the 1990s of the show, moved into the role of co-executive producer at the start of the 10th season. The theme was written by John Benitez. The show was produced by The Garth Ancier Company and was distributed by Columbia Pictures Television Distribution (1993–1995), then by Columbia TriStar Television Distribution (1995–2001), Columbia TriStar Domestic Television (2001–2002), and Sony Pictures Television (2002–2004). In the UK the series first appeared on Saturday October 1, 1994, on Channel 4 and continued until 2001.

By January 1995, the show was syndicated on 212 television stations across the United States.

In the 2000s, the tabloid talk show subgenre experienced a general decline in popularity with audiences favoring game shows. The show reached the milestone of its 1,500th episode on May 14, 2001.

In February 2002, the show was renewed for a tenth season.

== Reception ==
Awards the show has garnered include the Gracie Allen Award, PRISM Certificates & Commendations, and many more.

=== Critical response ===
New York listed it as one of the worst television shows of 1995.

=== Cultural impact ===
Time described the show's impact as "enormous"; its format was reproduced by many talk shows including Carnie!, The Tempestt Bledsoe Show, Danny, and The Mark Walberg Show.

It has been referenced in popular music, such as in the Offspring's "Pretty Fly (For a White Guy)" and the Femme Fatale remix of Britney Spears's "Till the World Ends".

In 2022, Lake launched the podcast Raised by Ricki, which was a "part re-watch podcast and part cultural re-examination of [the] show."

=== Awards and nominations ===
Awards and nominations
Award	Year	Category	Nominee(s)	Result	Ref.
Daytime Emmy Awards	1994	Outstanding Daytime Talk Series	Ricki Lake	Nominated	
Excellence in Media's Silver Angel Award	2001	National Television	"Teen Pregnancy PSA Campaign"	Won	
Prism Awards	2003	Talk Show Series Episode	"Ephedra: Miracle Supplement or Deadly Drug?"	Won	

== Aftermath ==
In 2000, Ricki Lake told her audience on The Rosie O'Donnell Show that her contract was up for renewal in 2004. In September 2003, rumors began swirling about the show's demise as Lake was in serious talks to be cast in a 30-minute sitcom for CBS. On January 21, 2004, The Futon Critic reported that "the show's future remains up in the air" due to the sitcom, and because Lake herself was not in attendance at the convention. In February 2004, the show was officially cancelled. Witnessing 9/11 from the rooftop of her New York City apartment, Lake has stated in several interviews that at that point she knew "I am getting out of my marriage, I am getting out of this show". On June 27, 2019, Ricki told Rupaul that two days after the attacks, she had to go back and do topics that, although still loving her show, didn't reflect what she wanted her legacy to be. Surprisingly, Sony Pictures didn't provide any comments when the show was cancelled, despite a large profit the show brought.

On October 9, 2005, Broadcasting & Cable magazine reported that Lake might return to do a new version of her show. A source said it would be a surprise if there was no deal struck by October 2005. If it were to have happened, it would have likely debuted in September 2006. Lake did not appear at the 2006 NATPE convention to pitch the proposed program to television stations in the United States in January, 2006, only furthering speculation that there would be no show. In a 2009 interview on CNN, she was asked about what was next for her. Lake noted that a follow-up documentary was coming out, and that she was in talks to do another talk show, but this has yet to come to pass. In follow-up interviews since then such as Oprah in 2010, Lake has consistently said "never say never" about hosting a new show, but that she is happy working on other projects. However, in a February 2011 appearance on The View, when asked about doing another show, Ricki said that she "misses the platform" and that when it comes to hosting another show, "that's certainly a possibility."

In March 2011 it was reported that three television studios, Disney–ABC Domestic Television, Universal Media Studios and CBS Television Distribution, were interested in bringing Lake back to talk television in 2012. This after Lake began appearing on various programs in which she expressed a desire to return to the genre. On April 20, 2011, Lake signed with 20th Television to develop a subsequent talk show for a September 2012 launch. It is described as having more of an Oprah-like format than her previous series.
