= Miss Understood =

American drag queen

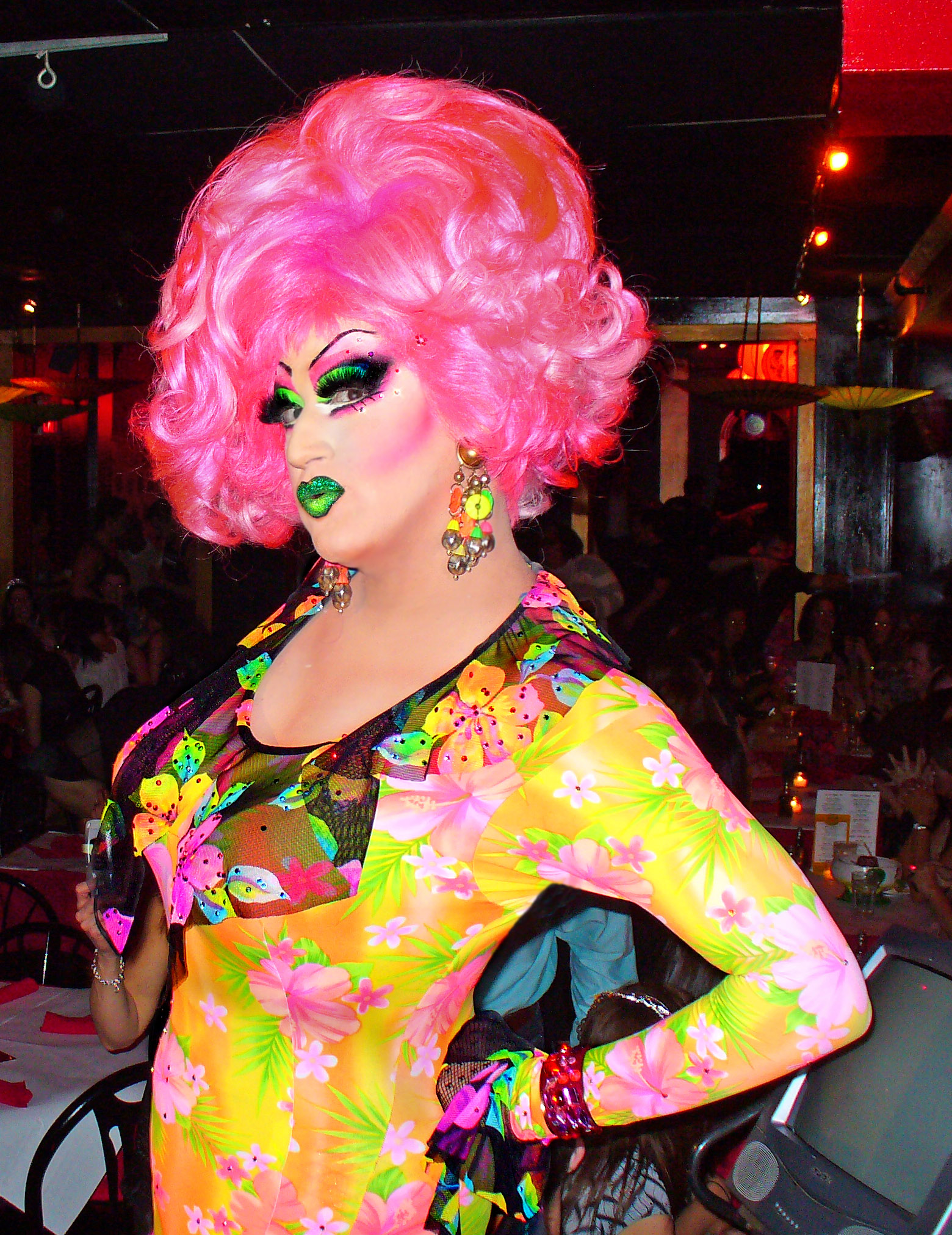
- Miss Understood as Mistress of Ceremonies at Lucky Cheng's in 2007
- Born: Alexander Heimberg; Levittown, New York

Miss Understood (born Alexander Heimberg) is an American drag queen originally from Levittown, New York, who has been based in New York City since the late 1980s. She was a prominent figure in the East Village drag scene of the early 1990s which revolved around the legendary Pyramid Club and Wigstock, an annual open air drag festival.

Her film and television appearances include The Brenda and Glennda Show; To Wong Foo, Thanks for Everything! Julie Newmar; HBO's Dragtime; TLC's Faking It; Wigstock, The Movie; Project Runway; and Sex and the City. In Josh Kilmer-Purcell's New York Times Bestselling Memoir I'm Not Myself These Days, one of the first competitions that Kilmer-Purcell's enters is one of Miss Understood's in New York City's "Lucky Chengs", a drag queen theme restaurant.

== Screaming Queens Entertainment ==
In 1993, Miss Understood started a drag queen booking agency called Screaming Queens Entertainment, for which she acts as "CEO and Spokesmodel." The company was developed to showcase some of the outrageous personalities Heimberg encountered in her early days. "When I first went clubbing, I was stunned by what I saw: a whole world of surreal looking characters that never left their homes before midnight. I had seen people dressed in drag before, but in New York, drag meant something totally different. It wasn't necessarily about passing as a woman, but about looking outrageous, feeling fabulous, and getting attention." Prominent events for which Screaming Queens provided entertainment include George Stephanopoulos's bachelor party, Barbra Streisand's Farewell Concert VIP dinner, the Hugo Boss Christmas party; and New York Magazine's 30th anniversary, amongst others.

== See also ==
- LGBT culture in New York City
- List of LGBT people from New York City
