= Garth Ancier =

American television producer media executive

- Born: September 3, 1957 (age 69); Perth Amboy, New Jersey, U.S.
- Education: Princeton University (AB)
- Occupation: Media executive

Garth Ancier (born September 3, 1957) is an American film and television producer and media executive.

== Early life ==
Ancier graduated from the Lawrenceville School in 1975 and Princeton University in 1979.

He began his broadcasting career as a high school sophomore in 1972, working as a reporter for NBC radio affiliates WBUD-AM and WBJH-FM in Trenton, New Jersey. In radio, he created American Focus, a weekly national interview program carried by over 300 radio stations in the U.S., including New York's WNBC, under the non-profit Focus on Youth. Ancier served as executive producer and host of over 250 episodes through 1979, each featuring a full-length career retrospective interview with guests ranging from Ayn Rand to Henry Fonda to David Brinkley. The show continued production for 17 years. Other guests included presidents Jimmy Carter, Gerald R. Ford, George H. W. Bush, and Caspar W. Weinberger, Lucille Ball, Howard Cosell, Henry Fonda, Tom Wolfe and Pete Rose. Five hundred of its programs were given to what is now known as the Paley Center for Media in 1984.

== Career ==
Ancier's network television career began in 1979 when NBC Entertainment president Brandon Tartikoff hired him as a program associate. He rose through the ranks and supervised production of the network's top comedies including The Cosby Show, Cheers, Family Ties and Golden Girls.

In 1986, Barry Diller, Jamie Kellner and Rupert Murdoch tapped the then 28-year-old Ancier to be the founding entertainment president for the new Fox Broadcasting Company, where he put The Tracey Ullman Show, 21 Jump Street, Married... with Children, The Simpsons, In Living Color, America's Most Wanted, and COPS on the air.

Ancier went from Fox (resigning March 1, 1989) to Disney as president of network television for Walt Disney Studios on April 18, 1989. He developed Home Improvement and oversaw Disney's signature franchise The Magical World of Disney, hosted by Disney CEO Michael Eisner.

From October 1991 through July 1992, Ancier served as the television consultant to the Democratic National Committee, specifically to advise on the television presentation of the Democratic Convention in New York City and reporting to DNC Chairman Ron Brown. In that role, Ancier introduced political convention format innovations, such as a 56-screen "videowall" integrated into the convention podium and program, to such forums for the first time. Later on, Ancier's production company developed and produced the talk show Jane Pratt, which debuted in mid-March 1992 on WNYW-TV in New York City and was intended for nationwide launch. However, despite good ratings, the show ended after only 11 weeks in production, as co-producer and distributor 20th Television felt it was too expensive for them to seek a return on their investment in the program.

Also in late 1992, Ancier co-created and executive produced Ricki Lake with former Donahue producer Gail Steinberg. The tabloid talk show aired for 11 seasons from 1993 to 2004.

In 1994, Ancier re-teamed with Fox colleague Jamie Kellner and Warner Bros. CEO Barry Meyer to launch The WB as its chief programmer from 1994 to 1999, where he helped put 7th Heaven, Dawson's Creek, Charmed, Buffy the Vampire Slayer, Felicity, The Steve Harvey Show and The Jamie Foxx Show on the air.

Beginning in May 1999, Ancier served as president of NBC Entertainment, where he helped put The West Wing and Law & Order: Special Victims Unit on the air, while conversely being the one who cancelled the 1999 teen dramedy series Freaks and Geeks, a move over which in 2014 he wrote that it was "an awful decision that has haunted me forever". Ancier was forced out from NBC in November 2000.

Ancier returned to what had become AOL Time Warner in 2001 as EVP, Programming for Turner Broadcasting (including the WB) and programmed CNN, TBS, TNT, etc., where he launched CNN's American Morning and its signature 10 p.m. newscast with Anderson Cooper, as well as expanded Adult Swim on Cartoon Network by acquiring the then-cancelled Family Guy series from 20th Century Fox.

Ancier returned to The WB as co-chairman in September 2003, then became the Chairman of the WB Television Network from May 2004 until its merger with UPN to form The CW in September 2006, during which Supernatural and One Tree Hill were launched. He was transferred to run In2TV, the Warners/AOL broadband television network. Through the Garth Ancier Company, he was developing a talk show at the pilot stage while negotiating a potential network, cable and first-run syndicated shows deal with Telepictures and Warner Horizon as of October 2006.

He served as first president of BBC Worldwide America from February 2007–March 2010, where he launched Top Gear, Torchwood, and DC produced BBC World News America (BBC's first American produced daily newscast) on BBC America. Ancier also moved BBC's iconic Doctor Who series from the Syfy network to BBC America and prepared CBeebies for a US launch. Ancier was able to increase by 78% BBC Worldwide America's profit and was to continue to hold a director's seat on its board after his departure from management was planned for March 2010.

In April 2013, Ancier formed Zeus Media Partners, Inc. as a retro cable network company to provide four decade focused channels (1960s–1990s), later called The Quad.

Ancier has worked for a number of media corporations as a senior advisor to management on digital streaming, SVOD and vMVPD projects. His most notable clients have been Intel Media on a virtual-MSO system, and IAC/Vimeo.

He is also known for being one of only two people (the other being Fred Silverman) to have programmed three of the five American broadcast television networks (founding programmer at Fox, founding programmer at The WB (now The CW), and NBC Entertainment).
