= Ivanna Cázares =

Mexican transgender model and Beauty pageant

- Born: Ivanna Cázares Velasco; December 27, 1990 (age 35); Manzanillo, Colima, Mexico
- Height: 178 cm (5 ft 10 in)
- Beauty pageant titleholder
- Hair color: Black
- Eye color: Brown
- Major competitions: Miss Trans Beauty Mexico 2019 (Winner); Miss Trans Nacional México 2022 (Winner); Miss International Queen 2023 (Top 6)

Ivanna Cázares Velasco (born December 27, 1990) is a Mexican transgender model and beauty pageant titleholder. She represented Mexico at Miss International Queen 2023 held in Pattaya, Thailand and reached the top 6.

== Early life and education ==
Cázares was born on December 27, 1990, in Manzanillo, Colima. She holds a degree in communications and owns a beauty salon. Despite the challenges of transitioning, she found strength in the support of her family and focused on building acceptance in society.

== Career pageantry ==
Cázares gained national attention in 2019 when she was crowned Miss Trans Beauty Mexico. She competed against 21 other contestants and stood out with her indigenous-themed costume, elegant performance, and thoughtful answers on human rights and climate change. Her win marked an important step forward for transgender visibility in Mexico, and she became a strong voice advocating for respect and inclusion.

In 2023, she proudly represented Mexico at the Miss International Queen pageant in Pattaya, Thailand, where she placed in the Top 6. Ivanna continues to use her platform to promote dignity, equality, and understanding for the transgender community.

Awards and achievements
Preceded by Alejandra Morales	Miss Trans Nacional México; 2023	Succeeded by Romina Amador
Preceded by Brenda Arantza	Miss Trans Beauty Mexico; 2019	Succeeded by Ivanna Díaz
