= Amber Richards =

American female impersonator (1957–1996)

- Born: November 17, 1957; Marion, Indiana, US
- Died: May 12, 1996 (aged 38); Smyrna, Georgia, US
- Resting place: Riverside Cemetery Grant County, Indiana
- Other names: Amber Marie Williams
- Education: Marion High School, Butler University
- Alma mater: Art Institute of Atlanta
- Occupations: Transgender female impersonator; Performer; Television personality
- Years active: 1976–1996
- Known for: Miss Continental
- Television: The Jenny Jones Show, The Jerry Springer Show, The Sally Jessy Raphael Show

Amber Marie Williams (November 17, 1957 – May 12, 1996), better known by the stage name Amber Richards, was an American transgender female impersonator, performer, and television personality. Richards was active in drag pageantry beginning in the late 1970s, competing in local and national pageants including Miss Gay America, Miss Continental, Miss Florida Female Impersonator, Miss Gay USofA, and Miss National. She won the Miss Florida FI pageant in 1985 and Miss Continental USA in 1991. Richards appeared on daytime talk shows in the early 1990s and helped introduce an American audience to issues of gender identity, sexuality, and transgender rights at a time when members of the LGBTQ community were parodied and ridiculed.

== Early life and career ==
Richards was born in Marion, Indiana, on November 17, 1957, and graduated from Marion High School in 1976. She began performing in Indianapolis, Indiana, at the Famous Door nightclub and participated in her first drag pageant at The Hunt & Chase where she was crowned Miss Gay Indiana Emeritus in 1979.

Richards moved to Daytona Beach, Florida, in 1977 before relocating to Atlanta, Georgia, where she became a mainstay of Atlanta nightlife performing at nightclubs including Sweet Gum Head, Illusions, Lavita's, Lipstix, Deana's One Mo Time, Petrus, Backstreet, The Otherside, Revolutions, and many more. Amber headlined two cabaret style shows at The Otherside in Atlanta including The Amber Richards Show and Dangerous Divas. She traveled extensively during this time and performed in clubs and pageant productions throughout the United States and abroad.

Richards was a featured performer at the Hollywood Hots fundraiser, an annual event in Atlanta which raised money for the National Association of People with AIDS. The 5th Annual Hollywood Hots fundraiser took place on September 11, 1993, in the lower lot of the Atlanta Heretic on Cheshire Bridge Road and featured Amber along with other performers including winner of the 1973 Miss Gay Georgia America pageant, Charlie Brown.

She made many of her own costumes and developed a friendship with Bob Mackie who made custom gowns for some of the top contestants in the Miss Continental pageantry system. Richards's love for fashion led her to pursue a BFA in Fashion Design at the Art Institute of Atlanta. Her pageantry costumes, evening gowns, and club wear epitomized the contemporary fashion stylings of the 1980s and '90s, and included sequins, beaded fringe, and ornate applique patterns that featured a variety of embroidered elements. Amber's distinctive club wear included ornately beaded chokers, over-sized earrings that combined bead work with rhinestones, and strappy body suits made from strips of leather and other materials.

She was awarded the title Glamour Goddess at the First Annual Southern Voice Community Awards which took place on April 17, 1993, at Zoo Atlanta. She served as an official emcee for the Atlanta Pride Celebration in 1994 and 1995.

Richards made television appearances on The Jenny Jones Show, The Jerry Springer Show, Sally Jessy Raphael and a Japanese game show. She appeared on a 1995 episode of The Jerry Springer Show entitled "My Girlfriend Is A Man" and an episode the following year filmed in Daytona Beach during Spring Break 1996 entitled "Men Living as Women". A publicity shot of Amber can be seen in the 1997 film Midnight in the Garden of Good and Evil during the scene when John Kelso (played by John Cusack) visits the Lady Chablis in her dressing room.

== Pageantry ==
| Year | Pageant | Location | Venue | Title |
|---|---|---|---|---|
| 1979 | Miss Gay Indiana America | Indianapolis, Indiana | Hunt & Chase | Emeritus Winner |
| 1979 | Miss Gay America | Atlanta, Georgia | Fox Theater | Unknown |
| 1980 | Miss Continental | Chicago, Illinois | Baton Show Lounge | 4th Alternate |
| 1980 | Miss Gay Georgia | Atlanta, Georgia | The Answer Lounge | 2nd Alternate |
| 1981 | Miss Continental | Chicago, Illinois | Baton Show Lounge | 2nd Alternate |
| 1984 | Miss Georgia Continental | Unknown | Unknown | Winner |
| 1984 | Miss Continental | Chicago, Illinois | Baton Show Lounge | Unknown |
| 1985 | Miss Florida FI | Unknown, Florida | Unknown | Winner |
| 1988 | Miss Continental | Chicago, Illinois | Baton Show Lounge | 4th Alternate |
| 1989 | Miss Gay USofA | St Louis, Missouri | Unknown | Top 13 |
| 1989 | Miss Continental | Chicago, Illinois | Baton Show Lounge | 4th Alternate |
| 1991 | Miss Gay Tennessee USofA | Nashville, Tennessee | Warehouse II | 1st Alternate, Winner of Evening Gown and Interview Categories |
| 1991 | Miss Gay Georgia USofA | Atlanta, Georgia | Unknown | Winner |
| 1991 | Miss Gay USofA | Atlanta, Georgia | Unknown | 4th Alternate |
| 1991 | Miss Alabama Continental | Unknown | Unknown | Winner |
| 1991 | Miss Continental | Chicago, Illinois | Baton Show Lounge | Winner |
| 1994 | Miss Southern States USofA | Unknown | Stepdown at Scandals in Asheville, North Carolina | Winner |
| 1994 | Miss Gay USofA | St Louis, Missouri | Unknown | 2nd Alternate |
| 1994 | Miss Gay National | Atlanta, Georgia | International Ballroom, Omni Hotel, CNN Center | 2nd Alternate, Winner of Evening Gown Category |

== Death ==
Richards died from smoke inhalation during a house fire at her Wright Street residence in Smyrna, Georgia, on Sunday May 12, 1996. Her funeral was held on Friday, May 17, 1996, at the H.M. Patterson & Son Spring Hill Chapel located at 1020 Spring Street NW in Midtown Atlanta. A wake service was held at the Revolutions bar in Ansley Square on Piedmont Avenue. The Atlanta City Council issued a proclamation in honor of her life and service and proclaimed May 17, 1996, Amber Marie Richards-Williams Day. She was honored at the 1996 Atlanta Pride Celebration with a special memorial tribute on June 30, 1996, in Piedmont Park.
