= Miss International Queen 2020 =

15th Miss International Queen pageant

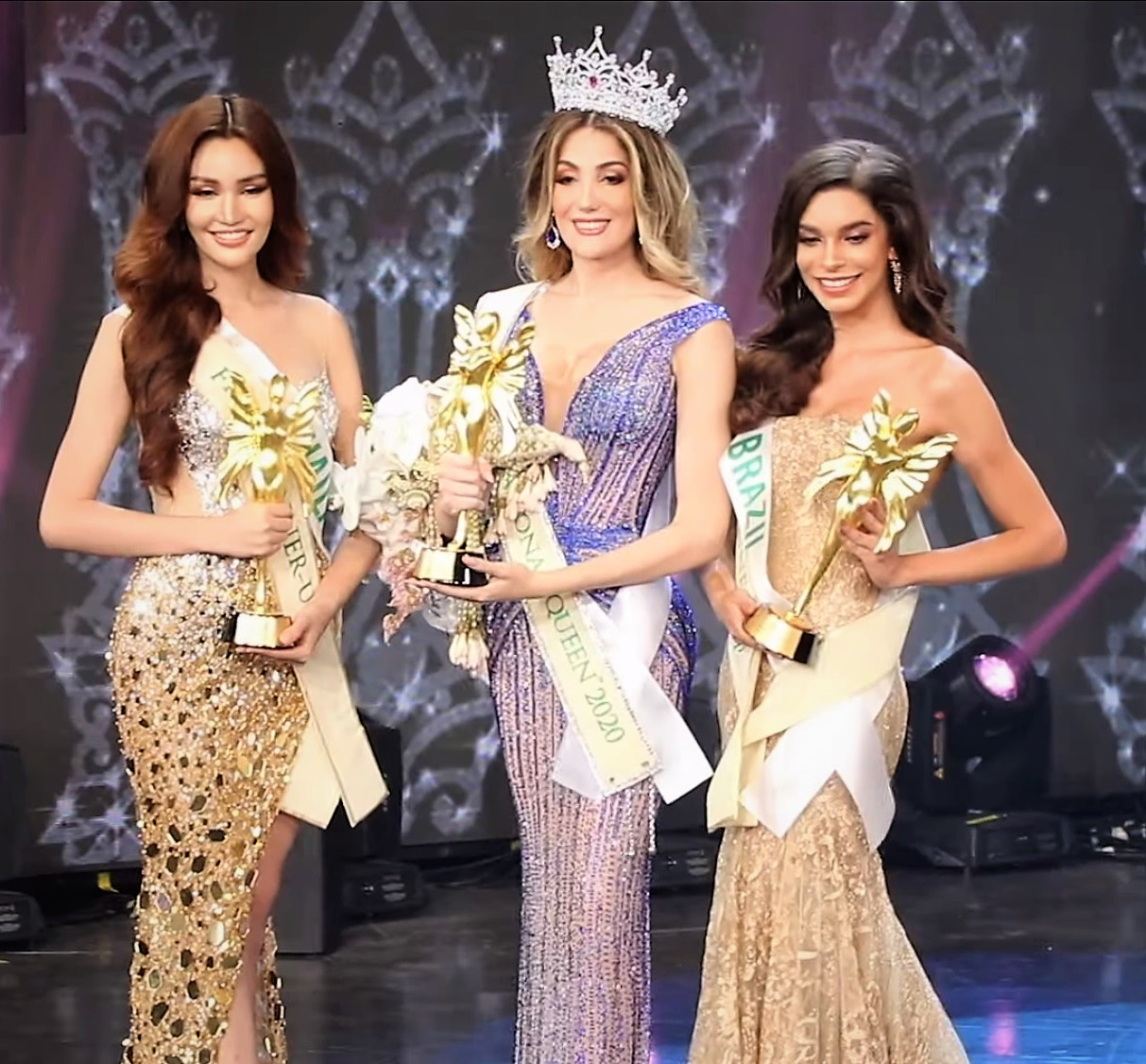
- From left: Thailand, Mexico, Brazil
- Date: 7 March 2020
- Presenters: Piyawat Kempetch; Saraichatt Jirapatt
- Entertainment: Jazell Barbie Royale
- Venue: Pattaya, Chonburi, Thailand
- Broadcaster: Channel 3 (Thailand)
- Entrants: 21
- Placements: 12
- Debuts: Norway
- Withdrawals: Canada; Ecuador; South Korea; Nepal; Nicaragua; Panama; Venezuela
- Returns: Australia; France; Mongolia; Singapore; Sweden; Taiwan ROC
- Winner: Valentina Fluchaire; Mexico
- Congeniality: Gebby Vesta; Indonesia
- Best National Costume: Wanie Mohtar; Malaysia
- Photogenic: Jess Labares; Philippines

Miss International Queen 2020 was the 15th Miss International Queen pageant, held at the Tiffany's Show Pattaya in Pattaya, Chonburi, Thailand, on March 7, 2020.

Jazell Barbie Royale of the United States crowned Valentina Fluchaire of Mexico as her successor at the end of the event. This is the second time that Mexico claimed the title.

== Results ==
=== Placements ===
Placement	Contestant
Miss International Queen 2020	Mexico – Valentina Fluchaire
1st Runner-Up	Thailand – Ruethaipreeya Nuanglee
2nd Runner-Up	Brazil – Ariella Moura
Top 6	Australia – Jan Brielle; France – Louiz Avendei; Philippines – Jess Labares
Top 12	China – Lacey Wang Xinlei; Laos – Aliya Sirisopha; Malaysia – Wanie Mohtar; Norway – Eirin Grinde Tunheim; Taiwan – Loey Wang; Vietnam – Bùi Đình Hoài Sa §

§ – placed into the Top 12 by winning Most Popular Introductory Video

=== Special awards ===
Award	Contestant
Best National Costume	Malaysia – Wanie Mohtar
Miss Congeniality	Indonesia – Gebby Vesta
Miss Photogenic	Philippines – Jess Labares
Best in Evening Gown	Mexico – Valentina Fluchaire
Best in Talent	France – Louiz Avendei
Most Popular Introductory Video	Vietnam – Bùi Đình Hoài Sa

=== Best in Talent ===
Award	Contestant
Winner	France – Louiz Avendei
1st Runner-Up	Vietnam – Bùi Đình Hoài Sa
2nd Runner-Up	Taiwan ROC – Loey Wang
Top 13	Australia – Jan Brielle; China – Lacey Wang Xinlei; India – Nithu R.S.; Indonesia – Gebby Vesta; Laos – Aliya Sirisopha; Mexico – Valentina Fluchaire; Myanmar – May Than Yo †; Sweden – Victoria Tran; Thailand – Ruethaipreeya Nuanglee; United States – Kayley Whalen

== Contestants ==
21 contestants competed for the title.

Country or territory	Contestant	Age	Hometown	Occupation
Australia	Jan Brielle	34	Melbourne	Nurse
Brazil	Ariella Moura	22	São Paulo	Model
China	Lacey Wang Xinlei	32	Shanghai	Model
France	Louiz Avendei	36	Réunion Island	Musician Teacher, Singer & Writer
India	Nithush Alimaishani	29	Karnataka	Tattoo Artist & Yoga Expert
Indonesia	Gebby Vesta	33	Bali	Professional DJ, Model & Song Writer
Japan	Rio Takahashi	21	Tokyo	Model
Laos	Aliya Sirisopha	23	Vientiane	Student, Actress & Model
Malaysia	Wanie Mohtar	26	Sabah	Performer & Business Owner
Mexico	Valentina Fluchaire	25	Colima	Model
Mongolia	Uyanga Hokyatwoklem	30	Ulaanbaatar	Model
Myanmar	May Than Yo †	21	Yangon	Model
Norway	Eirin Grinde Tunheim	27	Tromsø	Dentistry Medicine Student
Peru	Nataly Saavedra	34	Lima	Model, Chef & Activist
Philippines	Jess Labares	26	Manila	Flight Attendant
Singapore	Andrea Razali	29	Singapore	Business Owner & LGBT Rights Advocate
Sweden	Victoria Tran	30	Stockholm	Model
Taiwan ROC	Loey Wang	24	Taipei City	Model
Thailand	Ruethaipreeya Nuanglee	27	Khon Kaen	Liberal Arts Student
United States	Kayley Whalen	35	Los Angeles	LGBT Rights Advocate
Vietnam	Bùi Đình Hoài Sa	28	An Giang	Model & Singer
