= Lady Catiria =

Puerto Rican drag performer and film actress

- Born: March 27, 1959
- Origin: Bayamón, Puerto Rico
- Died: May 3, 1999 (aged 40) Manhattan, New York, US
- Occupations: Drag performer Actor
- Years active: 1978–1999
- awards: Miss Continental

Catiria Reyes (March 27, 1959 – May 3, 1999), better known as Lady Catiria, was a Puerto Rican drag performer, film actress, and transgender beauty pageant winner. She was one of the main performers at the New York City Latino nightclub La Escuelita, where she entertained crowds for almost two decades. She was the first person to win two titles at the Miss Continental pageant in Chicago. Towards the end of her life, she became an advocate for AIDS awareness.

== Performance career ==
Lady Catiria began her career at the age of 19 years in the neighborhood of Jackson Heights, Queens, impersonating the Puerto Rican TV performer Iris Chacón. In the early 1980s, Lady Catiria moved to La Escuelita, a gay club located in midtown Manhattan, where she developed an extremely large following that would faithfully attend her lip-synching performances, especially on Saturday nights. Lady Catiria, who was a transsexual woman, stood out from other performers because of her body, looks, dance moves and penchant for exhibitionism. In general, she did not speak during her performances or while off-stage.

In the 1990s, Lady Catiria went on to participate in drag beauty pageants. In 1993, she won the Miss Continental Plus pageant, which features plus-size contestants. She then decided to compete in the Miss Continental pageant, which she won in 1995. She spent nearly $20,000 preparing for the contest, including dieting, working out with a trainer, traveling to Mexico to get liposuction, and eventually losing 30 pounds. It was while preparing for this competition that she learned that she was HIV positive.

The same year she won the Miss Continental pageant, Lady Catiria appeared in a cameo in To Wong Foo, Thanks for Everything! Julie Newmar, a film starring Wesley Snipes, Patrick Swayze, and John Leguizamo as three New York drag queens who embark on a road trip. Credited as "Catiria Reyes," she appears in the beginning of the film, in a scene in which the main characters are competing at a drag beauty pageant held at Webster Hall.

Lady Catiria announced she was HIV positive at the 1996 Miss Continental show during her last performance as reigning title holder. For this occasion, she had a $1,800 gown made, which was plain black with an AIDS ribbon in rhinestones as the collar. She also had her crown done over in red to match. She played a prerecorded tape, explaining that she was sick and needed everyone's support, and then did her number. Over 2,000 people attended this performance.

In February 1999, Lady Catiria received a farewell tribute at La Nueva Escuelita nightclub. She was unable to attend as she was recuperating from chemotherapy needed to fight Kaposi's sarcoma lesions that had developed in her lungs. She died due to complications of AIDS on May 3, 1999, and was buried in her native Puerto Rico.

Lady Catiria was featured in a June 1999 article in POZ magazine, where she was portrayed as an inspiration to people living with HIV/AIDS.

== Legacy ==
Numerous drag queens and transgender performers such as Candis Cayne, Angel Sheridan, and Mistress Maddie have credited Lady Catiria for her role as a mentor and friend. Candis Cayne, who went on to win the 2001 Miss Continental pageant, credits Lady Catiria for motivating her to participate in this pageant. The Puerto Rican actress Rosie Perez also described being a Lady Catiria fan and attending her show numerous times, after John Leguizamo took her to La Escuelita for the first time.

Puerto Rican gay scholars such as Lawrence La Fountain-Stokes have written about Lady Catiria's importance in the gay New York City community. La Nueva Escuelita released a memorial VHS and DVD compilation of performances by Lady Catiria and has a prominently featured display case with her Miss Continental gown and crown. The nightclub also includes numerous photos of her on its website.

== Prizes ==
- Miss Continental Plus (1993–1994)
- Miss Continental (1995–1996)

== See also ==
- List of Puerto Ricans
- List of gay, lesbian or bisexual people
- Puerto Ricans in the United States
