= Valentina Fluchaire =

Mexican transgender model

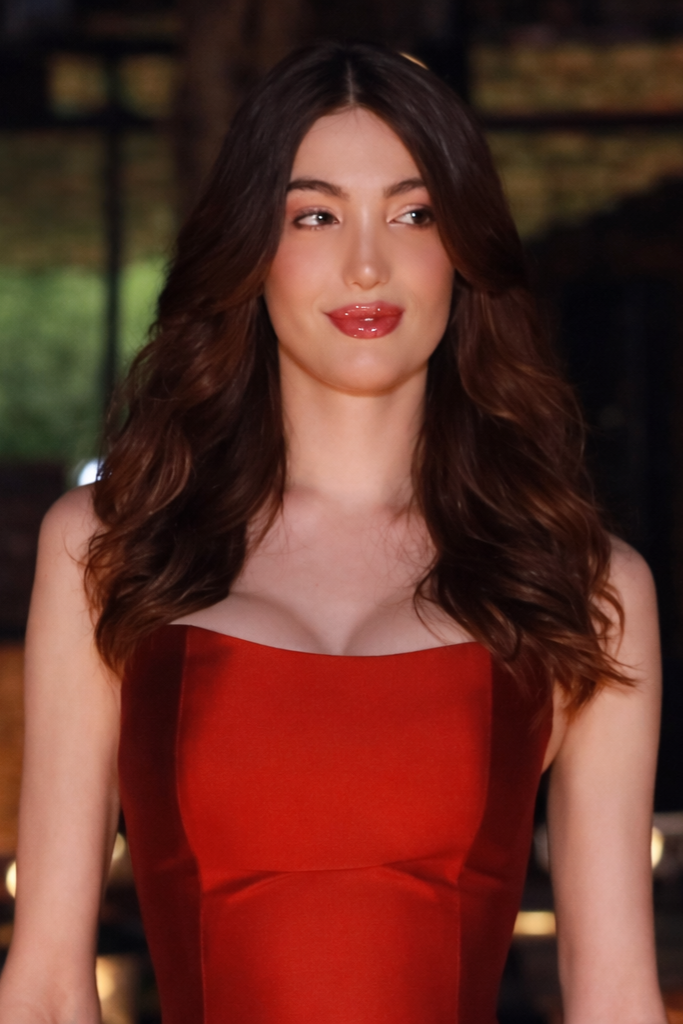
- Fluchaire in 2023
- Born: Valentina Fluchaire Mendoza; 1 July 1994 (age 32); Manzanillo, Colima, Mexico
- Occupation: Model
- Height: 183 cm (6 ft 0 in)
- Title: Miss International Queen 2020; Miss Trans Nacional México 2019

Valentina Fluchaire Mendoza is a Mexican transgender model and beauty pageant titleholder. She won the "Miss International Queen " transgender beauty pageant held in Pattaya, Thailand.

== Early life ==
Fluchaire was born July 1, 1994 in Manzanillo, Colima. She won her first pageant crown at age 15, an experience she described as revealing "many parts of myself" and leading to the realization of her transgender identity, stating, "In beauty pageants, I discovered that I was transgender."

== Career ==
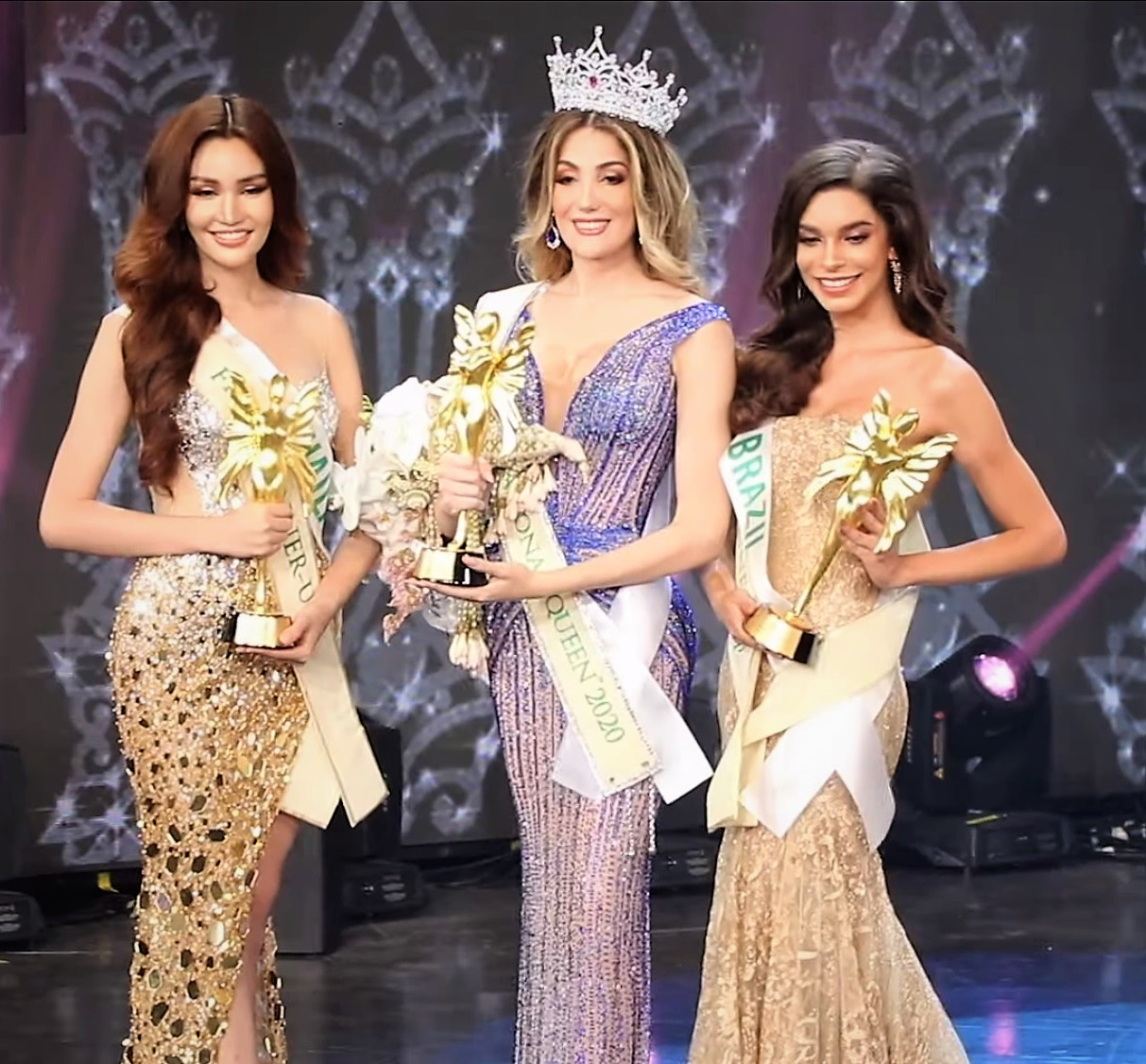
Miss International Queen 2020. From left: Thailand, Mexico, Brazil

The 15th Miss International Queen pageant, was held on 7 March 2020, at Pattaya, Chonburi in Thailand. Jazell Barbie Royale of the United States crowned her successor, Fluchaire of Mexico at the end of the event. She is the second Mexican to win the transsexual beauty pageant Miss International Queen.

In 2020, Fluchaire received the "LGBTIQ Personality + Revelation" award, recognized as the inaugural honor for the LGBTIQ community in Mexico, highlighting her contributions to positive representation. Through digital platforms and media appearances, she has advocated for human rights, equality, and reduced stigma faced by transgender individuals, though specific collaborations with organizations remain limited in public records.

Beyond advocacy, she supports non-LGBTQ+-specific charitable efforts, including aid to children battling cancer via the Corazón Azul initiative in Manzanillo, Colima, demonstrating a commitment to community welfare in her hometown.

Awards and achievements
Preceded by (United States) Jazell Barbie Royale	Miss International Queen; 2020	Succeeded by (Philippines) Fuschia Anne Ravena
Preceded by (Brazil) Rafaela Manfrini	MIQ Best Evening Gown; 2020	Succeeded by (Thailand) Kwanlada Rungrojampa
Preceded by Grecia Culpo	Miss Trans Nacional México; 2019	Succeeded by Alejandra Morales
