= To Wong Foo, Thanks for Everything! Julie Newmar =

1995 film by Beeban Kidron

- Theatrical release poster
- Directed by: Beeban Kidron
- Written by: Douglas Carter Beane
- Produced by: G. Mac Brown
- Starring: Wesley Snipes; Patrick Swayze; John Leguizamo; Stockard Channing; Blythe Danner; Arliss Howard; Chris Penn
- Cinematography: Steve Mason
- Edited by: Andrew Mondshein
- Music by: Rachel Portman
- Production companies: Universal Pictures; Amblin Entertainment
- Distributed by: Universal Pictures
- Release date: September 8, 1995
- Running time: 105 minutes
- Country: United States
- Language: English
- Budget: $30 million
- Box office: $47.8 million

To Wong Foo, Thanks for Everything! Julie Newmar is a 1995 American road comedy film directed by Beeban Kidron and starring Wesley Snipes, Patrick Swayze, and John Leguizamo as three New York City drag queens who embark on a road trip. Its title refers to an iconic autographed photo of Julie Newmar they carry with them on their journey. Newmar also has a cameo appearance in the film as herself.

The film was released by Universal Pictures in the United States on September 8, 1995, and held the number-one spot at the North American box office for two weeks with a worldwide gross of $47.8 million against a $30 million budget. Critical response was mixed, with particular criticism towards the plot and its familiar elements, but the performances of Swayze, Snipes, and Leguizamo were lauded. It has since become a cult favorite amongst the LGBTQ+ community. At the 53rd Golden Globe Awards, Swayze was nominated for Best Actor – Motion Picture Musical or Comedy, and Leguizamo was nominated for Best Supporting Actor – Motion Picture.

World Golf Hall of Fame member Juan Antonio "Chi-Chi" Rodríguez sued Universal Pictures for defamation, especially involving the use of his name in the film, eventually settling on undisclosed terms.

== Plot ==
After tying for the win in New York City's "Drag Queen of the Year" contest, Noxeema Jackson and Vida Boheme win a trip to Hollywood to take part in the even bigger "Drag Queen of America" pageant. Before they depart, Vida persuades Noxeema to take along the inexperienced "drag princess" Chi-Chi Rodriguez as their protégé (they initially refer to him simply as a "boy in a dress" rather than as a full-fledged drag queen). To do this, they cash in their plane tickets to a friend, John Jacob Jingleheimer Schmidt, and use the money to buy a yellow convertible 1967 Cadillac DeVille. They set off for Los Angeles in it, carrying with them an iconic autographed photo of Julie Newmar (signed "To Wong Foo, Thanks for Everything! Julie Newmar") that Vida took from a restaurant wall.

While on the road, they are pulled over by Sheriff Dollard, who hurls racial slurs then forces Vida out of the car and tries to rape her. Vida strikes him, and he is knocked unconscious. He is presumed dead, and the queens drive off. At a rest stop, they recover from the incident, but their car breaks down. Bobby Ray, a young man from the nearby small town of Snydersville, happens to pass by and gives them a ride to a bed and breakfast inn. The inn is owned by Carol Ann and her abusive car repairman husband, Virgil.

They are stranded in the town for the weekend waiting for the replacement part for their car. Chi-Chi is harassed by a group of rednecks but is saved by Bobby Ray. While volunteering to help with the town's Strawberry Social, they decide the town's women need a day with them getting their hair done, picking out new outfits, and talking in a café. While searching for the new outfits, they are ecstatic to find vintage fashions from the 1960s in the town's clothing store and give the female residents (and themselves) a makeover.

Following their makeover, they are abused by the same rednecks that attempted to harass Chi-Chi. Fed up, Noxeema handles the situation in a typical New York City manner and teaches their ringleader a lesson in manners by making him apologize and compliment the female residents. Vida, Noxeema, and Chi-Chi do what they can to be positive, and they set out to improve the lives of the townspeople, including offering assistance in organizing the Strawberry Social. Meanwhile, Sheriff Dollard is ridiculed by his colleagues, who believe he was beaten up by a girl. He goes in search of Vida.

Vida becomes acutely aware of Carol Ann's abuse at the hands of Virgil and, one night, decides to intervene, beating Virgil up before throwing him out of the house. Carol Ann is able to repair their car, but they remain for the Strawberry Social. Carol Ann reveals to Vida that she knew she was a drag queen all along due to her Adam's apple.

Virgil runs into Sheriff Dollard at a bar, and they realize that the newcomers are the same people Dollard has been searching for. They head back to Snydersville, and Dollard demands that the townspeople turn them over. The other townspeople, who now realize that their new friends are drag queens, devise a ruse to protect them. One by one, they confront Dollard, each one claiming to be a drag queen (in a similar fashion to Spartacus). Dollard is humiliated and flees. The Strawberry Social commences with everyone dressed in vibrant red outfits. The townspeople then say goodbye to Noxeema, Vida, and Chi-Chi as they prepare to leave. In honor of their friendship, Vida gives Carol Ann the autographed photo of Julie Newmar that has accompanied them on their trip.

They eventually make it to Los Angeles where Chi-Chi, after having received many tips from Vida and Noxeema during their ordeal, wins the title of Drag Queen of the Year. The crown is presented by Julie Newmar herself.

== Cast ==
- Wesley Snipes as Noxeema Jackson
- Patrick Swayze as Vida Boheme
- John Leguizamo as Chi-Chi Rodriguez
- Stockard Channing as Carol Ann
- Blythe Danner as Beatrice
- Arliss Howard as Virgil
- Jason London as Bobby Ray
- Chris Penn as Sheriff Dollard
- Melinda Dillon as Merna
- Beth Grant as Loretta
- Alice Drummond as Clara
- Marceline Hugot as Katina
- Jennifer Milmore as Bobby Lee
- Jamie Harrold as Billy Budd
- Mike Hodge as Jimmy Joe
- Michael Vartan as Tommy

=== Cameo appearances ===
- RuPaul as Rachel Tensions
- Julie Newmar as herself
- Naomi Campbell as girl at China Bowl
- Miss Understood (credited as Alexander Heimberg) as herself
- Joey Arias as Justine
- Catiria Reyes as herself
- Miss Coco Peru (credited as Clinton Leupp) as herself
- Quentin Crisp as NY pageant judge
- Susanne Bartsch as NY pageant judge
- Widow Norton as NY pageant judge
- Candis Cayne (credited as Brendan McDanniel) as herself
- Hedda Lettuce (credited as Steven Polito) as herself
- Robin Williams as John Jacob Jingleheimer Schmidt (uncredited)
- Lady Bunny as herself (uncredited)

== Production ==
=== Development ===
Writer Douglas Carter Beane originally envisioned the script as a stage play but changed his mind when he realized putting a car on stage might not work. Beane was inspired by an anti-gay propaganda film titled The Gay Agenda. Of that film, Beane said, "There's a scene where they show drag queens going through a town, and the narrator is warning the viewers that these people will take over your town, and I thought, 'Well, that would be fun'."

The script found its way to Mitch Kohn, then a development executive at Amblin Entertainment. Kohn passed the script along to his boss Steven Spielberg, who "loved it". Spielberg had his friend Robin Williams do a humorous cold reading of the script while on a plane, which "mesmerized" the director. Williams expressed interest in a possible role but did not want to distract from the three leads, so he opted for a small cameo appearance.

When the script officially went into development at Amblin, multiple unnamed male directors passed on directing. British director Beeban Kidron begged Spielberg to let her direct, and he accepted. Though advertising companies wanted to change the film's title to the shorter Ladies' Night or She's a Lady, Beane's script managed to keep the original title, which came from an autographed picture of Julie Newmar that Beane saw on the wall of a Times Square Chinese restaurant in the mid-1980s. Beane said Wong Foo is meant to be a metaphor for God, "because you have to thank God for everything. You have to be grateful for life. You just have to stop where you are and say thank you for everything." A scene was filmed where the characters provide more context, but it was deleted.

=== Casting ===
When it came to casting the leading men, Wesley Snipes and John Leguizamo (for whom the role of Chi-Chi Rodriguez was specifically written) both immediately said yes. Many actors were considered for the role of Vida Boheme, including Robert Downey Jr., William Baldwin, Gary Oldman, Matthew Broderick, James Spader, John Cusack, Mel Gibson, Robert Sean Leonard, Willem Dafoe, John Turturro, Matt Dillon, Rob Lowe, Johnny Depp, Tom Cruise, and Robin Williams (who has a brief cameo in the finished film). Patrick Swayze was one of the last actors to audition for Vida. Director Beeban Kidron said that it was ultimately Swayze's walk that sealed the deal, saying "Swayze had his own makeup people transform him into a woman, and he insisted that he and Beeban take a walk around the city to prove he could pass as a woman" and "With his beauty and dancer's grace, he did just that. He had the job."

The film featured dozens of New York City's drag performers and underground stars in small roles or as featured extras. Included in the mix were RuPaul, Joey Arias, Lady Bunny, Miss Understood, Candis Cayne, Flotilla DeBarge, Miss Coco Peru, Lady Catiria, and Quentin Crisp. The three lead actors spent time in the local drag scene while researching their roles and were each given a drag mentor to work with in developing their characters. Costume designer Marlene Stewart had the leads' wardrobes, including the shoes and corsets, custom-made.

=== Filming ===
Filming took place from July to October 1994. The drag contest seen in the beginning scene was filmed at Webster Hall in New York City. The John Shaffer Phipps Estate in Old Westbury, New York, now known as Old Westbury Gardens, was the site of the Miss Drag Queen USA contest at the end of the film. Film locations in New Jersey included Jersey City (site of the Canton Restaurant in which the opening restaurant scenes were shot) and Montclair. Much of the film was shot on location in Nebraska in the areas of Loma, Lincoln, and Omaha. Though greatly faded, a "Welcome to Snydersville" outdoor mural remains in Loma.

In interviews and recollections with actors and crew after the film, the production of To Wong Foo has been described as "a tough shoot", partly due to the discomfort the male leads experienced with their extensive makeup and costumes. On location filming and a 4½-month-long shoot also contributed to friction among cast and crew.

Kidron was pregnant when she accepted the directing job. As her due date drew nearer, Spielberg offered to step in and direct for her if needed. Kidron ultimately completed principal photography and gave birth immediately after filming wrapped.

A scene involving the drag trio dining at a McDonald's was scrapped after the company told producers they did not want to be associated with drag queen culture. Coca-Cola agreed to product placement, and a billboard for the soda company is featured in a prominent scene in the film.

The Australian film The Adventures of Priscilla, Queen of the Desert was released in 1994 and became an international and critical success. To Wong Foo shares certain plot details with Priscilla, which also concerns two drag queens and a transgender woman on a road trip who manage to win over the locals of a small town. Despite the similarities, To Wong Foo had already been in production by the time Priscilla was released. The crew of Priscilla had heard about the film while shooting their own, and though a producer was initially worried the films might be too similar, after reading To Wong Foo's script, producers decided it was sufficiently different from Priscilla. The success of Priscilla, along with the popularity of drag queens like RuPaul and the 1990 documentary Paris Is Burning, is credited with helping pave the way for To Wong Foo.

== Soundtrack ==
To Wong Foo, Thanks for Everything!

Soundtrack album by Various Artists
- Released: August 29, 1995
- Genres: Pop, dance music, R&B
- Length: 44:02
- Label: RCA Records

The film's soundtrack was released on August 29, 1995. It consists of eleven tracks:

No.	Title	Length
1.	"I Am the Body Beautiful" (Salt-N-Pepa)	4:52
2.	"Free Yourself" (Chaka Khan)	4:13
3.	"Turn It Out" (Labelle)	4:54
4.	"Who Taught You How" (Crystal Waters)	4:56
5.	"She's a Lady" (Tom Jones)	2:20
6.	"Brick House" (Commodores)	3:34
7.	"Nobody’s Body" (Monifah)	5:21
8.	"Do What You Wanna Do" (Charisse Arrington)	4:33
9.	"Hey Now (Girls Just Want to Have Fun)" (Cyndi Lauper)	3:41
10.	"Over the Rainbow" (Patti LaBelle)	5:38
11.	"To Wong Foo Suite: When I Get to Hollywood/A Day With the Moms/Moms Mabley/Stand Up" (Rachel Portman)	7:12
Total length:		44:02

Music and songs not included in the soundtrack:

- "Gotta Move" – Barbra Streisand
- "Theme From Wonder Woman" – Charles Fox (composer)
- "Je Cherche un Homme" [I Want a Man] – Eartha Kitt
- "Behind Closed Doors" – Charlie Rich
- "Stand by Your Man" – David Allan Coe
- "This is a Man's World" – Sara Hickman
- "Hold Me, Thrill Me, Kiss Me" – Johnny Mathis
- "(Hey Won't You Play) Another Somebody Done Somebody Wrong Song" – B.J. Thomas
- "1812 Overture" – Tchaikovsky
- "Zampa Overture" – Ferdinand Herold
- "China Girl" – Robert J. Walsh
- "That Lady You're with Ain't No Lady" – Larry Applewhite/Gene Wisniewski

== Release ==
=== Box office ===
To Wong Foo was released wide in North American theaters on September 8, 1995. It opened at the number-one position with $9 million and remained at the top in its second week with a gross of $6.5 million. Its lifetime box-office gross revenue totaled US$47.8 million worldwide.

== Home media ==
The film was released on VHS after its theatrical release and on DVD on January 7, 2003, with several deleted scenes. It was released as a special collector's edition Blu-ray by Shout! Factory on May 28, 2019. The edition includes the behind-the-scenes documentary Easy Rider in Dresses: A Look Back at the Making of To Wong Foo, Thanks for Everything! Julie Newmar, which features interviews with screenwriter Douglas Carter Beane, director Beeban Kidron, and John Leguizamo. In Sweden, the film was titled High Heels and released in May 1996 on VHS.

== Reception ==
=== Critical response ===
On Rotten Tomatoes, the film has an approval rating of 48% based on 46 reviews, with an average rating of 5.4/10. The site's consensus states: "To Wong Foo, Thanks for Everything! Julie Newmar seeks to celebrate individuality, but is too timid and predictable to achieve its admittedly noble aims." On Metacritic, the film has a weighted average score of 60 based on reviews from 24 critics, indicating "mixed or average reviews". Audiences surveyed by CinemaScore gave the film a grade "B+" on scale of A to F.

Though critical reviews were mixed, the performances of the three leads were roundly praised. Joe Brown of The Washington Post called the film "fiercely funny" and wrote, "Three snaps up for Patrick Swayze, Wesley Snipes and John Leguizamo, who walk the walk, and work it." Emanuel Levy of Variety gave a mixed review but wrote, "Sporting blond wigs, Snipes admirably wiggles his hips while wearing high-heeled red shoes. Using a low register, Swayze also excels as a man still suffering from parental rejection. Shining throughout is the brilliant Leguizamo, as the Latino spitfire who needs to prove to his comrades that he's more than 'a mere boy in a dress.'"

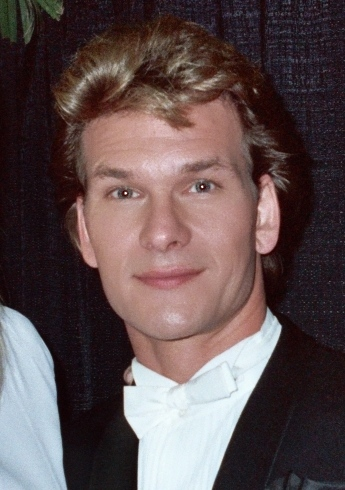
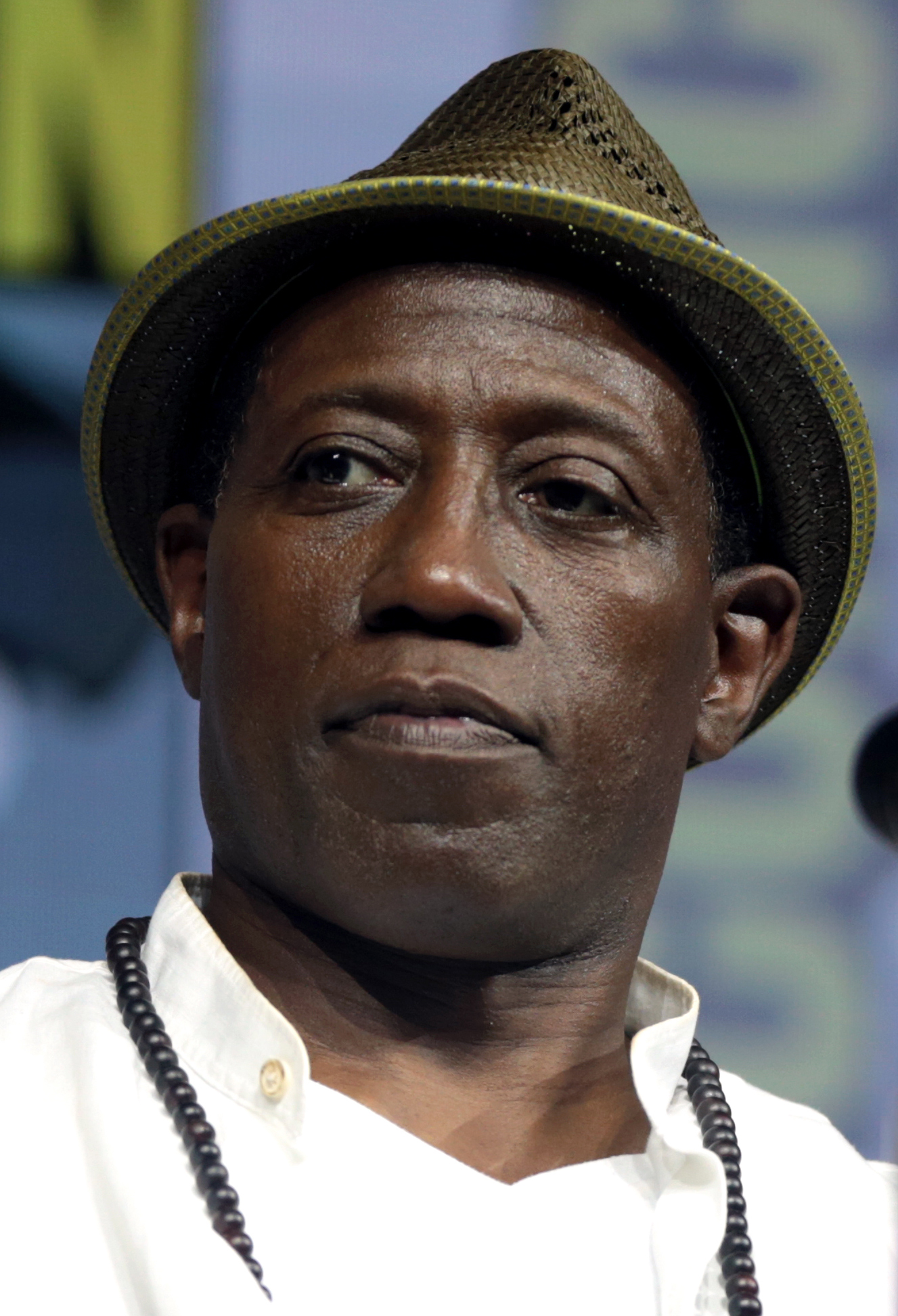
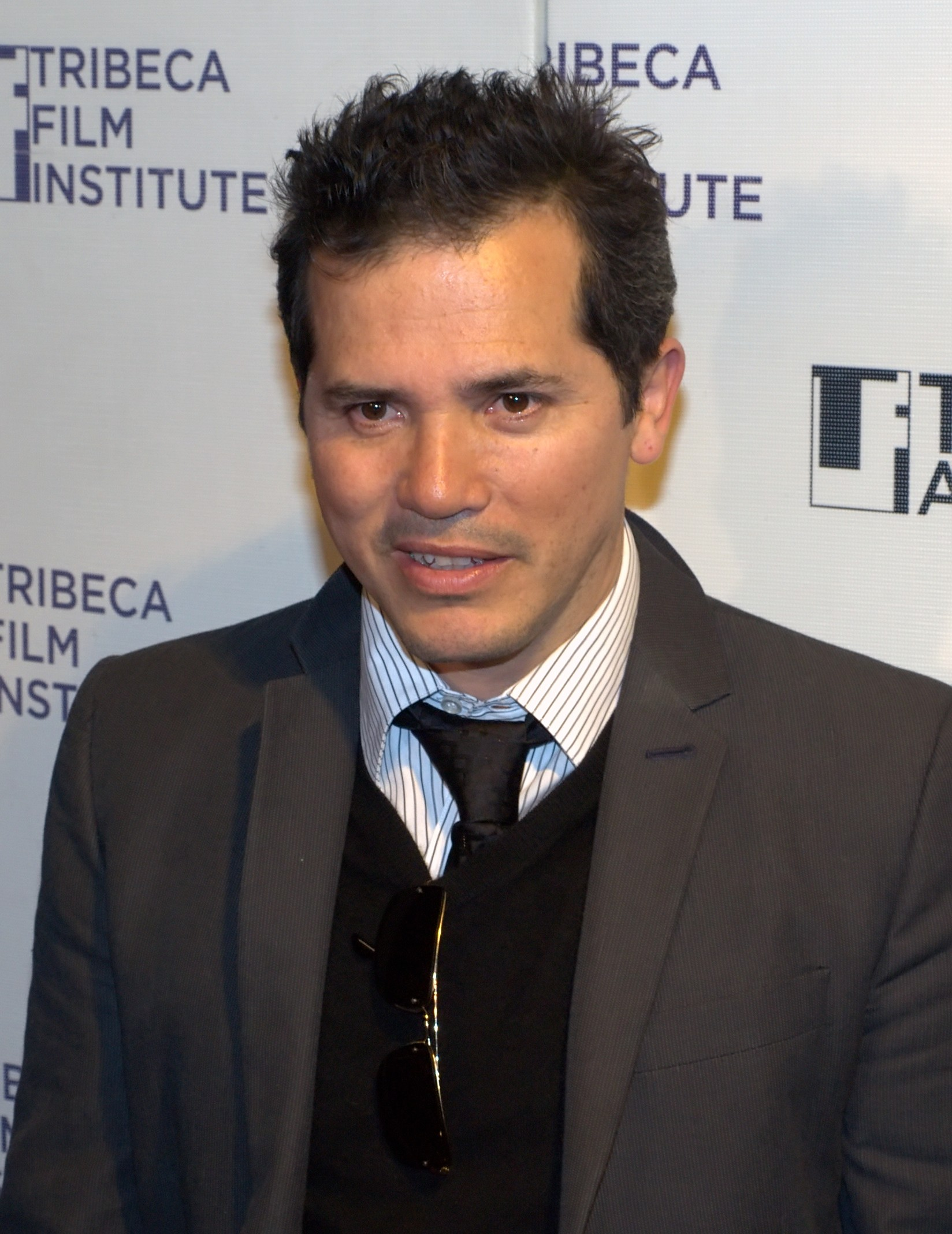
Patrick Swayze, Wesley Snipes, and John Leguizamo received critical praise for their performances.

Roger Ebert of the Chicago Sun-Times wrote, "What is amazing is how the movie manages to be funny and amusing while tippy-toeing around (a) sex, (b) controversy and (c) any originality in the plot. Credit for that belongs to Swayze, Snipes and Leguizamo, who are surprisingly good at playing drag queens." While Ebert gave the film 2 1/2 stars out of four, his colleague Gene Siskel gave a more positive review and predicted an Oscar nomination for Swayze.

Multiple critics pointed out the film's similarities to The Adventures of Priscilla, Queen of the Desert and said To Wong Foo was subpar in comparison due to the predictability of its plot, script and tonal unevenness. The decision to have the leads spend most of the film in drag, even going to bed in their wigs and makeup, was also criticized as straining credulity. Kenneth Turan of the Los Angeles Times wrote screenwriter Beane and director Kidron "don't seem to know any way to emphasize the humanity of their characters except by swaddling them in mushy cliches". Actor and writer Michael Kearns argued the film and its promotion is "eager to wink and snicker at homosexuality". The film's omission of "any hint of gay sexuality" was noted by Janet Maslin of The New York Times, as well as Brown of the Post, who decried the fact that "always in the (admittedly few) mainstream movies with gay characters, [the film's] hero-ines" do not get to partake in the film's romantic story arcs, and appear to only function as asexual fairy godmothers for the townspeople of Snydersville.

In a positive review, Edward Guthmann of the San Francisco Chronicle wrote, "It's a distant cry from the reality of gay bashings, poverty and evictions that real-life drag queens suffer—which may be part of its point. Imagine, Wong Foo suggests, a world where people stopped judging one another and simply surrendered to the silliness that's dormant inside us."

The Austin Chronicle's Alison Macor shared a similar sentiment, writing that while the film's sentimentality may go too far for some, To Wong Foo "is such a delight that it's easy to overlook the few awkward moments", adding, "The film camps it up but still allows us to believe in the characters."

Emanuel Levy concluded though the film "is not as outrageous or funny as [Priscilla] ... it still offers some rewards as mainstream entertainment" and that "ultimately, the comedy comes across as a celebration of openness, alternative lifestyles and bonding, all life-affirming values that in the 1990s are beyond reproach—or real controversy".

== Accolades ==
Swayze and Leguizamo were nominated at the 1996 Golden Globe Awards, for Best Actor – Motion Picture Musical or Comedy and Best Supporting Actor, respectively.

The film was nominated for Outstanding Film at the 1996 GLAAD Media Awards.

== Legacy ==
To Wong Foo is considered groundbreaking for being the first mainstream Hollywood production to depict drag queens in a positive and non-cartoonish light. Rita Kempley of The Washington Post wrote that in comparison to previous films that featured cross-dressing like Some Like It Hot or Tootsie, "The heroines [in To Wong Foo] aren't cross-dressing to escape the mob or to prove a point, they're just being true to their nature."

In a 2019 retrospective piece about the film, writer Naveen Kumar noted "the film's language and understanding of gender variance is undoubtedly limited as a product of its time" and that the film "[blended] iterations of queer experience that tend to have clearer distinctions in the real world, and for which we have more nuanced language today". Among the film's language and concepts that are now considered problematic is the terminology used by the characters to describe the differences in queer identities.

Of the leads being in drag for the duration of the film, some critics said this was an intentional part of the film's camp element. Kumar added, "That To Wong Foo's drag performances remain completely unbroken throughout the film's entirety heightens the movie's extreme emphasis on beauty and artifice" and that the film is very "conscious of its ironies [as] Swayze and Snipes were both box-office draws known for hypermasculine and romantic leading roles; the perceived incongruity of dressing them in drag is part of what fuels the comedy". In this way, Kumar wrote, "To Wong Foo plays on viewers' suspension of disbelief (Swayze and Snipes, in particular, are clearly recognizable under their women's garb)" and that the "movie's own characterizations tend to blur the lines between drag as a conscious performance and their desire to actually be seen, day and night, as women".

Of the characters staying in drag, Douglas Carter Beane said his intent was to create an illusion, saying, "It is about fantasy and the illusion. It's about the work that goes into the art form. It was never meant to be an absolutely truthful documentary look at drag." Candis Cayne, who appears in the film, said its fantasy element can also be seen as problematic, "[perpetuating] an idea that transgender identity is nothing but make-believe". Drag queen Alaska Thunderfuck said that what the film does best is "the camaraderie between the girls... the way they look out for each other and protect one another. The movie also illustrates the transformative power of drag. It helps people become empowered, no matter where they come from or what kind of life they lead".

== Musical ==
In 2017, it was announced that Douglas Carter Beane and his husband Lewis Flinn were working on a musical adaptation for Broadway. In an interview, Beane stated that he had originally written To Wong Foo for the stage and had retained stage rights when the screenplay was produced. The musical premiered at the Hope Mill Theatre in Manchester on October 21, 2023.

== See also ==
- The Adventures of Priscilla, Queen of the Desert, a similar road trip film about drag queens
- Cross-dressing in film and television
- List of LGBTQ-related films directed by women
- List of cult films: T

== Bibliography ==
- Busch, Charles (September 5, 1995). "Risky Business". The Advocate. No. 689. pp. 48–54. ISSN 0001-8996.
