= Ariella Moura =

Brazilian model and beauty titleholder (born 1995)

- Born: May 19, 1999 (age 27); Belo Horizonte, Minas Gerais, Brazil
- Height: 180 cm (5 ft 11 in)
- Title: Miss International Queen Brazil 2020

Ariella Moura (born May 19, 1999) Brazilian model and beauty pageant titleholder who won the Miss International Queen Brazil 2020 and was second runner-up in the Miss International Queen 2020 pageant.

== Pageantry ==
Moura entered the pageant world amid Brazil's high rates of violence against transgender individuals, motivated by the murders of friends in transphobic attacks, aiming to challenge gender discrimination through visibility and representation. Her participation in Miss International Queen 2020, held in Pattaya, Thailand, positioned her as second runner-up representing Brazil and highlighted her advocacy for equality in a country marked by societal prejudice despite broader openness on other issues.

Awards and achievements
Preceded by (China) Lou Ya Ya	Miss International Queen 2nd Runner-up; 2020	Succeeded by (France) Aëla Chanel
Preceded by Rafaela Manfrini	Miss International Queen Brazil; 2020	Succeeded by Eloá Rodrigues
