= Baton Show Lounge =

Drag club in Chicago

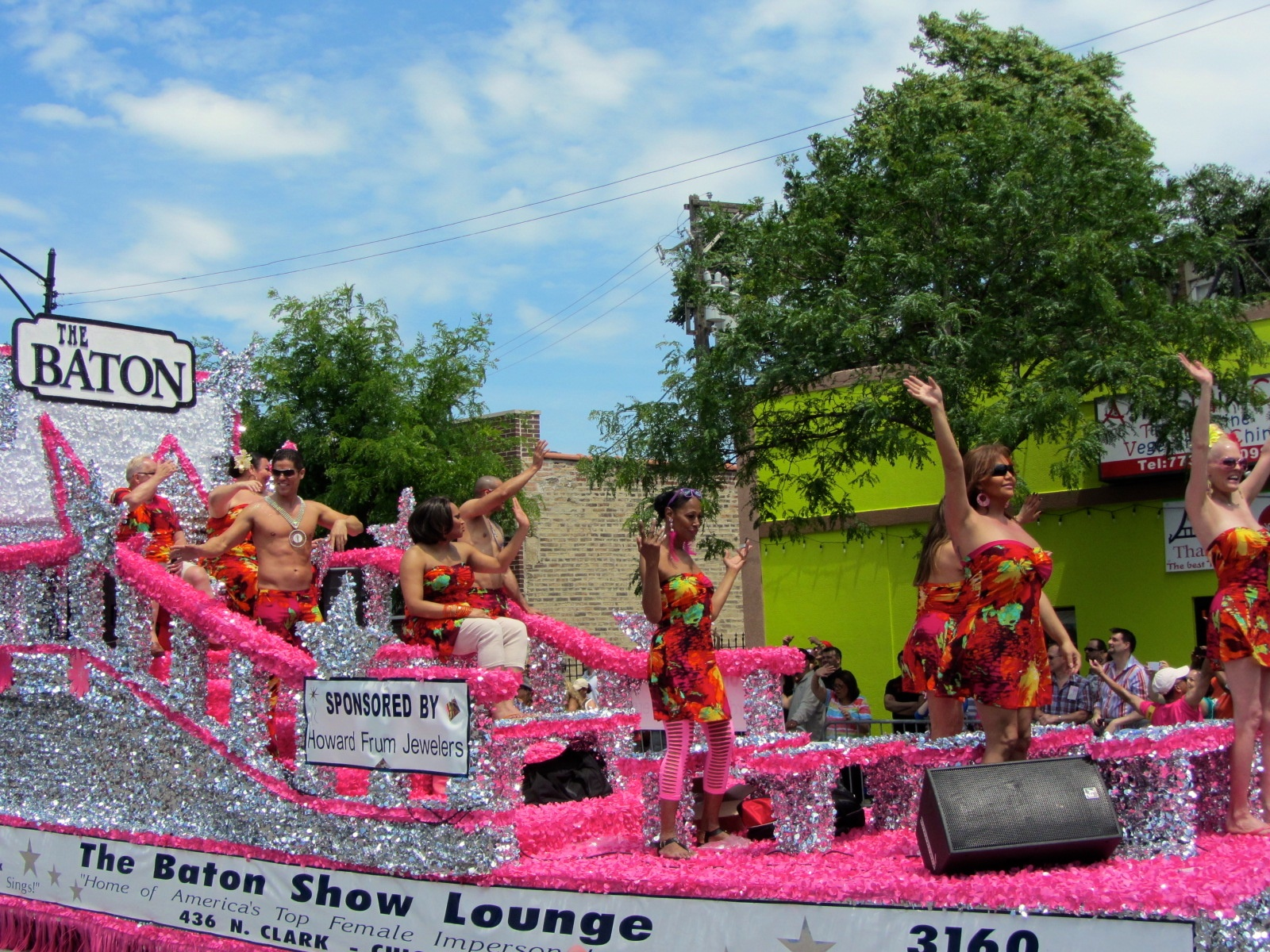
- The Baton Show Lounge float, Chicago Pride Parade 2013
- Interactive map of Baton Show Lounge
- Address: 4713 N. Broadway; Chicago; United States
- Location: Uptown Chicago
- Coordinates: 41°58′4.39″N 87°39′31.47″W
- Owner: Jim Flint, Christoph Chiavazza
- Capacity: 195
- Type: LGBT
- Event: Drag
- Public transit: Broadway and Leland; Ravenswood
- Parking: ParkChicago #466107; ParkChicago #466108

Construction
- Opened: 1969
- Years active: 1969-present

Website
- www.thebatonshow.com

Baton Show Lounge is a Chicago drag club founded in 1969. It is the venue for the Miss Continental pageant.

== History ==
Baton Show Lounge was founded in 1969 in River North. The first venue's address was 436 N. Clark St. The name was inspired by Flint's time in the Navy as a drum major. He would attract crowds by baton twirling and roller skating on the street.

The early days of the lounge were marked by police raids.

The venue moved to its present address at the Uptown Broadway Building in Uptown at the end of 2018 due to rent hikes. The new venue provides a capacity of 195 seats with an additional disco and bar room. Grand opening of the new location was on April 10, 2019.

In 2025, HV Entertainment bought the lounge and announced plans to reopen the Chicago Eagle, a former gay bar catering to the leather LGBT community, previously located at 5015 N Clark St in Andersonville. HV Entertainment pledged to provide a dedicated space for the Baton Show Lounge within the bar.

=== Miss Continental ===
Flint organized the first Miss Continental Pageant in 1980. He started the competition as an inclusive pageant for all female impersonators, including those who have taken hormones or had surgical enhancements.

=== Dance Divas benefit ===
Since 2008, Dance Divas is a group that has held a benefit show for Chicago Dancers United at Baton Show Lounge. Proceeds help members of the arts community with health expenses.

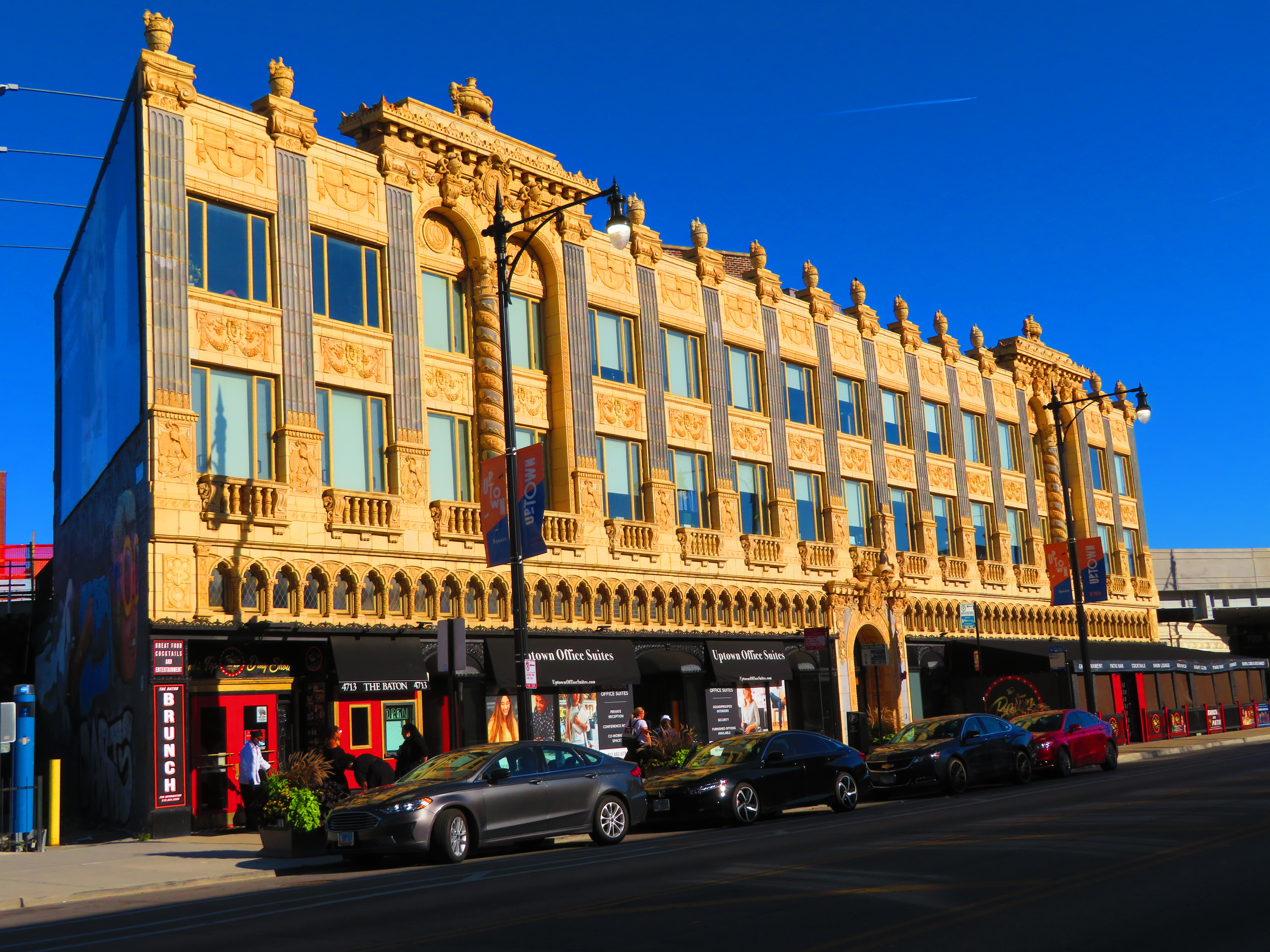
Uptown Broadway Building, home to the Baton Show Lounge

=== Notable performers ===
- Mimi Marks
- Candace Cayne

=== Notable guests ===
- Madonna
- RuPaul
- Janet Jackson
- Ted Kennedy
- Joan Crawford
- Alexandra Billings
- Chris Farley
- Kirk Douglas

== Popular media ==
The Queens, a documentary directed by Mark Saxenmeyer, premiered in 2020 and focused on the 2011 Miss Continental competition.

The cast appeared on several shows, including: Phil Donahue, Maury Povich, Oprah, Sally Jesse Raphael, Jenny Jones, People are Talking, 190 North, and ABC 7 New Year's Eve Celebrations.
