= Miss International Queen 2023 =

17th Miss International Queen pageant

- Date: 24 June 2023
- Presenters: Piyawat Kempetch; Saraichatt Jirapatt
- Theme: A Creation
- Venue: Tiffany's Show Pattaya, Pattaya, Chonburi, Thailand
- Broadcaster: Channel 3
- Entrants: 22
- Placements: 11
- Debuts: Netherlands
- Withdrawals: France; Honduras; India; Korea; Paraguay; Taiwan
- Returns: China; Nicaragua; Singapore; Spain
- Winner: Solange Dekker; Netherlands
- Congeniality: Tianna Lee Rivera; Puerto Rico
- Best National Costume: Nguyễn Hà Dịu Thảo; Vietnam
- Photogenic: Mika; China

Miss International Queen 2023 was the 17th Miss International Queen pageant, held at the Tiffany's Show Pattaya in Pattaya, Chonburi, Thailand, on June 24, 2023.

At the end of the event, Solange Dekker of the Netherlands was crowned by Fuchsia Anne Ravena of the Philippines. This was the first time in the history of Miss International Queen in which a delegate from Europe won the pageant.

== Results ==
=== Placement ===
Placement	Contestant
Miss International Queen 2023	Netherlands – Solange Dekker
1st Runner-Up	Singapore – Qatrisha Zairyah Kamsir
2nd Runner-Up	United States – Melony Munro
Top 6	Mexico – Ivanna Cázares; Philippines – Lars Pacheco; Thailand – Arissara Kankla
Top 11	China – Mika; Colombia – Ange La Furcia; Spain – Victoria Fernandes; Venezuela – Miranda Monasterios; Vietnam – Nguyễn Hà Dịu Thảo §

§ – Voted into the Top 11 by viewers.

== Special awards ==
Award	Contestant
Best in Evening Gown	United States – Melony Munro
Best Talent	Thailand – Arissara Kankla
Miss Congeniality	Puerto Rico – Tianna Lee Rivera
Miss Photogenic	China – Mika
Miss Popular Vote	Vietnam – Nguyễn Hà Dịu Thảo
Best National Costume	Vietnam – Nguyễn Hà Dịu Thảo
Wonder Woman Award	Vietnam – Nguyễn Hà Dịu Thảo

=== Best in Talent ===
Award	Contestant
Winner	Thailand – Arissara Kankla
1st Runner-Up	United States – Melony Munro
2nd Runner-Up	China – Mika

== Contestants ==
22 contestants competed for the title.

Country/Territory	Delegate	Age (Note: Ages at the time of the pageant)	Height (Note: Height at the time of the pageant)	Hometown
Brazil	Isabella Santorinne	29	1.73 m (5 ft 8 in)	São Paulo
Cambodia	Van Be	25	1.74 m (5 ft 8 1/2 in)	Phnom Penh
Canada	Adrian Reyes	29	1.65 m (5 ft 5 in)	Winnipeg
China	Mika	28	1.70 m (5 ft 7 in)	Beijing
Colombia	Ange La Furcia	31	1.67 m (5 ft 5 1/2 in)	Bogotá
Ecuador	Anahi Ferterling	32	1.80 m (5 ft 11 in)	Quito
Indonesia	Millen Cyrus	24	1.79 m (5 ft 10 1/2 in)	Jakarta
Japan	Kama Tomo	27	1.74 m (5 ft 8 1/2 in)	Tokyo
Laos	Kanrayany Sisouphanh	27	1.70 m (5 ft 7 in)	Vientiane
Malaysia	Zieyra Alisya	25	1.70 m (5 ft 7 in)	Sabah
Mexico	Ivanna Cázares	32	1.78 m (5 ft 10 in)	Manzanillo
Netherlands	Solange Dekker	27	1.85 m (6 ft 1 in)	Amsterdam
Nicaragua	Brenda López	28	1.78 m (5 ft 10 in)	Managua
Peru	Luna Reátegui	22	1.73 m (5 ft 8 in)	Tarapoto
Philippines	Lars Pacheco	26	1.65 m (5 ft 5 in)	Bocaue
Puerto Rico	Tianna Lee Rivera	33	1.74 m (5 ft 8 1/2 in)	Naranjito
Singapore	Qatrisha Zairyah Kamsir	32	1.77 m (5 ft 9 1/2 in)	Singapore
Spain	Victoria Fernandes	31	1.77 m (5 ft 9 1/2 in)	Madrid
Thailand	Arissara Kankla	22	1.78 m (5 ft 10 in)	Bangkok
United States	Melony Munro	34	1.82 m (5 ft 11 1/2 in)	Orlando
Venezuela	Miranda Monasterios	27	1.77 m (5 ft 9 1/2 in)	Puerto La Cruz
Vietnam	Nguyễn Hà Dịu Thảo	23	1.83 m (6 ft 0 in)	Hải Dương
