= James W. Flint =

American drag performer and businessman

Jim Flint
- Born: July 28, 1941 (age 85)
- Other name: Felicia (drag name)

James W. "Jim" Flint (born July 28, 1941) is a drag performer and American businessman.

== Early life ==
Flint grew up in Peoria, Illinois. He joined the Navy and became a drum major, which inspired the name of the Baton Show Lounge.

== Career ==
Flint is the founder of the Baton Show Lounge, Annex 2, Annex 3, Redoubt, and River North Travel. In the late 1970s and early '80s, he was associated with the Chicago Knight MC and participated in “Toys for Tots”. He was also involved in the early stages of Chicago House.

Within the Windy City Athletic Association, Flint has been active, sponsoring over 70 sports teams. In 1987, he sought a position on the Cook County Board of Commissioners as one of Chicago's first openly gay candidates. He is involved in the 46th Ward Democratic Organization, among other groups.

He organized the first Miss Continental Pageant in 1980.

== Bibliography ==
- Jim Flint: The Boy From Peoria, Tracy Baim and Owen Keehnen (Prairie Avenue Productions, 528 pages)
