= Jazell Barbie Royale =

American transgender beauty contestant

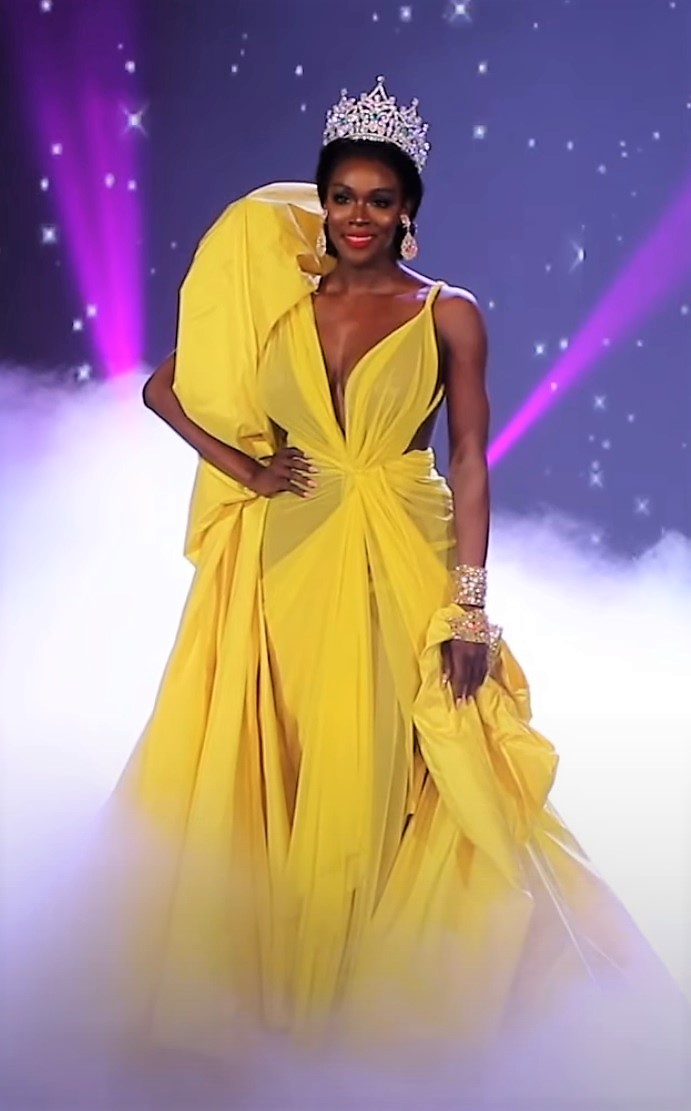
- Royale final walk at Miss International Queen 2020 pageant
- Born: August 8, 1987 (age 38); Jacksonville, Florida, United States
- Occupations: singer entertainer
- Height: 170 cm (5 ft 7 in)
- Title: Miss Continental 2016; Miss International Queen 2019

Jazell Barbie Royale, also known as Jazell Tisci (born August 8, 1987) is an American beauty pageant titleholder, singer, and entertainer. She won the Miss Continental pageant in 2016 and, in 2019, she became the second American and the first woman of African descent to win Miss International Queen. In 2022, Royale placed fourth during the second season of Queen of the Universe.

== Biography ==
Royale was born on August 8, 1987, in Jacksonville, Florida. She is a transgender woman.

In 2016, Royale won the Miss Continental drag pageant. In 2019, she became the second American, and the first woman of African descent, to win Miss International Queen, the largest beauty pageant for transgender women in the world. She was succeeded as Miss International Queen in 2020 by Valentina Fluchaire of Mexico.

In May 2022, her nomination was announced at the 2022 WOWIE Awards as part of RuPaul's DragCon in Los Angeles in the category Hottest Hottie Award (The Thirst Follow Award). She competed on the second season of Queen of the Universe and placed fourth.

Royale lives in Orlando and works as a healthcare provider and a nightclub performer.

Awards and achievements
Preceded by (Belgium) Tiffany T. Hunter	Miss Continental; 2016	Succeeded by (United States) Shantell D'Marco
Preceded by (Vietnam) Nguyễn Hương Giang	Miss International Queen; 2019	Succeeded by (Mexico) Valentina Fluchaire
