= Miss Continental =

Drag queen pageantry system

- Formation: 1980
- Type: Drag beauty pageant
- Headquarters: Baton Show Lounge
- Location: Chicago, Illinois
- Key people: Jim Flint (founder and CEO)
- Website: Official website; Official Facebook

Miss Continental is an annual drag queen pageantry system founded in 1980 by Jim Flint. The pageant takes place at the Baton Show Lounge in Chicago, Illinois, and it usually is held over Labor Day weekends.

== History ==
Jim Flint organized the first Miss Continental Pageant in 1980. He started the competition as an inclusive pageant for all female impersonators, including those who have taken hormones or had surgical enhancements.

The first competition had 14 contestants. Ten years later in 1990, there were 44 contestants and 25 preliminaries in the United States.

== Competitions ==
Also known as the Continental Pageantry System, the pageant features different competitions.

- Miss Continental Plus debuted in 1991, a pageant for competitors weighing 225 lb (102 kg) or more.
- Miss Continental Elite was created in 2004 for entertainers who are over the age of 40.
- Mr. Continental was formed in 2003 for male entertainers.
- Mr. and Miss Continental Newcomer was added in 2023 for those with three or fewer years of experience.

Contestants show five looks and a talent. More than 40 preliminary competitions occur around the world, and the finalists then come to Chicago for the event.

== Winners ==
Legend:
† indicates that the contestant is deceased.

Year	Miss Continental	Miss Continental Plus	Miss Continental Elite	Mr. Continental	Miss Continental Newcomer	Mr. Continental Newcomer
1980	Chilli Pepper †					
1981	Heather Fontaine					
1982	Tiffany Arieagus					
1983	Chena Black					
1984	Cherine Alexander †					
1985	Maya Douglas					
1986	Tandi Andrews †					
1987	Dana Douglas					
1988	Kelly Lauren					
1989	Lakesha Lucky					
1990	Chanel Dupree					
1991	Amber Richards †	Ginger Grant †				
1992	Mimi Marks	Denise Russell				
1993	Monica Munro	Lady Catiria †				
1994	Cézanne	Erica Christian				
1995	Lady Catiria †	Carmella Marcella Garcia †				
1996	Paris Frantz	Victoria Le Paige				
1997	Tasha Long	Dena Cass				
1998	Michelle Dupree	Santana T. Summers †				
1999	Tommie Ross	Terri Williams				
2000	Danielle Hunter	Tumara Mahorning				
2001	Candis Cayne	Angel Sheridan				
2002	Yoshiko Oshiro	Chevelle Brooks				
2003	Erika Norell	Victoria Parker		Carl Harris (dethroned); Ray Matthews		
2004	Erica Andrews †	Anjelica Sanchez	Nikki Adams	Antonio Edwards		
2005	Domanique Shappelle	Amaya	Barbara Herr	Tony Desario		
2006	Victoria Le Paige	Desiree DeMornay †	Maya Douglas	Simba Hall		
2007	Necole Luv Dupree	Tajma Hall †	Danielle Hunter	Rasean Montrese		
2008	Tulsi	Mercedes Tyler	Angel Sheridan	David "Freklz" Hunter		
2009	Armani	Coco Van Cartier	Michelle Fighter	Christopher Iman		
2010	Mokha Montrese	Roxxxy Andrews	Electra	Nick Gray		
2011	Alexis Gabrielle Sherrington	Chelsea Pearl †	Daesha Richards	Phillip Alexander		
2012	Sasha Colby	Tanisha Cassadine †	Dana Douglas	Angel Saez		
2013	Naysha Lopez	Whitney Paige †; Farra N. Hyte	Kourtney Paige Van Wales	Kalil Valentino		
2014	Brooke Lynn Hytes	Tahjee Iman	Lady Charisse Estrada †	Joey Taylor		
2015	Tiffany T. Hunter	Kofi	Chantal Reshae	Mykul J. Valentine		
2016	Jazell Barbie Royale	Natasha Douglas	Teryl Lynn Foxx	Antwuan Steele		
2017	Shantell D’Marco	Keke Velazquez-Lord	Fontasia L'Amour	Ramon Ventura		
2018	Stasha Sanchez	Chy'enne Valentino	Lorna Vando / Misty Knight (honorary) †	Sir Valentino		
2019	Vanessa Van Cartier	Darcel Stevens	A'zsia Dupree	Desi M. Andrews		
2020	Canceled due to the COVID-19 pandemic					
2021		Britney Taylor	Yosmein C. Starr			
2022	Juliana Rivera	Rachel Meredith	Layla LaRue	Travis Stancil		
2023	Sunny Dee-Lite	Lindsay Paige	Taylor St. James	Syvon Sinatra		
2024	Zhané Dawlingz	Alvion Arnell Davenport	Lee Ann Feathers / Fantasia Dior (honorary)	Noel Anaya	Dominink	Dioscar Montesino
2025	Raquell Lord	Tashae R. Sherrington	Alexis Mateo	Raul Griffith-Valentin	Joey Young	King Adonis
2026	Gadfrie Arbulu; Dina Jacobs (honorary)	Alexandrea Diamond	Kirby Kolby	Isaiah Sanchez Hilton	Sting Dion	King Adonis
2027	Pattaya Hart			Joshuan Aponte		Parker Phillips

== Popular media ==
The Queens, a documentary directed by Mark Saxenmeyer, premiered in 2020 and focused on the 2011 competition.

== See also ==
- Miss International Queen
- Miss Trans Star Internacional
