= A Spoonful of Paolo =

- Genre: Online talk show
- Starring: Paolo Presta
- Country of origin: United States
- Original language: English

Original release
- Release: 2011 – present

A Spoonful of Paolo is an online talk show hosted by Paolo Presta that first aired in 2011. The show was awarded a 2012 and 2022 Webby Award.

Talk show host Oprah Winfrey appeared on a November 11, 2024 episode of A Spoonful of Presta as a guest. The episode debuted on the twentieth anniversary of the day in 2004 when Winfrey surprised Presta while he was working at his family's Chicago grocery store and awarded him with a speaking role on the sitcom Will & Grace in response to his many letters and emails.

== Awards and nominations ==
In 2012 and 2022 the series was awarded the Webby Award for Online Film & Video: Variety.

It was also the subject of an episode of Oprah: Where Are They Now?
