= Nguyễn Thành Nam (YouTuber) =

Vietnamese YouTuber (born 1994)

- Born: Nguyễn Thành Nam; October 31, 1994 (age 31); Tien Hai, Thai Binh province, Vietnam
- Other name: NTN
- Occupation: YouTuber
- Height: 1.67 m (5 ft 6 in)

YouTube information
- Channel: NGUYỄN THÀNH NAM - NTN
- Years active: 2014–present
- Genres: Entertainment; Challenge; Crafting; Music; Experiments; Travel; Prank; Game Reviews (formerly)
- Subscribers: 10.3 million
- Views: 2.58 billion
- Last updated: April 23, 2026

Nguyễn Thành Nam (born October 31, 1994), commonly known by his stage name NTN, is a former Vietnamese YouTuber. His YouTube channel currently has over 10 million subscribers, making it the 14th most subscribed YouTube channel in Vietnam (as of Q3 2024). He is the first individual in Vietnam to own 1 Diamond Play Button, 4 Gold Play Buttons, and 4 Silver Play Buttons. Nguyễn Thành Nam is famous for being a pioneer in the field of vlogging on YouTube, but he is also famous for his controversial content.

Nguyễn Thành Nam currently owns 3 separate channels to create different content, including the main channel NTN (formerly known as NTN Vlogs, Nguyen Thanh Nam, Nờ Tờ Nờ) with over 10 million subscribers specializing in comedy challenges, Mr Nam Gaming (formerly Funny Game) with 1.5 million subscribers used for game commentary, Mr Nam Vlogs (formerly Monster NTN) with over 1.8 million subscribers specializing in prank videos. Previously, he also had another channel named NTN, which has since been deleted but also had over 1 million subscribers. With such a large number of subscribers, Nguyễn Thành Nam is the first Vietnamese YouTuber to own 4 Gold Play Button for all 4 content channels.

== Biography and career ==
Nguyễn Thành Nam was born on October 31, 1994, in Tien Hai town, Tien Hai district, Thai Binh province (now Tien Hai commune, Hung Yen province). Before starting his career as a YouTuber, he was a familiar face in the Vietnamese Crossfire Legend gaming community. He first gained attention online with his "Thử lòng người lạ" series of videos posted on the Mr Nam Vlogs channel (formerly Monster NTN). The main content of these videos involved pretending to be robbed, involved in Traffic collision, or lacking money to return home, etc., to test the honesty of those around him. Although the content of these videos was mostly not serious, they attracted a large online audience.

Since 2016, he has been posting videos on the NTN Vlogs channel, specializing in vlog about his daily life, challenge, and DIY projects. These videos have earned him millions of views and have become his main channel. On August 3, 2021, his channel officially reached 10 million subscribers, making him the first individual YouTuber in Vietnam to receive the YouTube Diamond Play Button. Also in 2021, he announced a temporary break from YouTube to form a new team and pursue bigger goals in the future.

== Controversy ==
Despite having a large number of subscribers, Nguyen Thanh Nam faced much criticism from the online community and a boycott wave due to videos deemed inappropriate. He once posted a video of himself eating instant noodles in a toilet. Although it has since been deleted, this video has been imitated by many other channels with similar content, which has been criticized by the public as offensive.

On November 21, 2016, Nguyễn Thành Nam and several others involved were summoned to the Hanoi City Police headquarters for staging and filming a video impersonating an ISIS terrorist throwing a bomb in a public place. Prior to this, Nguyễn Thành Nam had posted a video in which a young man named Vương Sơm Lâm played the role of a Muslims wearing a white shirt and white headscarf, carrying a package resembling explosives and throwing it into a crowded area. One scene showed this young man throwing a fake bomb at a bus stop, causing fear among many people. After being summoned by the police, Nam confessed and claimed his intention was to make people feel happy.

On November 14, 2019, Nguyễn Thành Nam posted a video titled "Thả 100 cái dao trên cao xuống" (lit. 'Drop 100 knives from a height.') which received mixed reactions from netizens. In this video, he dropped 100 knives bundled together from the rooftop of his house. His intention was to drop the knives onto a piece of pork placed on a thin piece of foam. After the knives hit the pork, he then dropped them onto a watermelon and two Coca-Cola bottles, causing them to explode. After three days of posting, the video received strong opposition from the online community for not providing any warning about its content.

Following the incident involving the knife-dropping video, which led to a boycott, Nam posted a clip announcing he would delete his channel. However, just two days after announcing the deletion of his channel, Nguyễn Thành Nam posted a new clip of himself dropping four gold play buttons, securing them to a parachute and then dropping them from a rooftop to the ground. This wasn't the only time Nguyễn Thành Nam announced his retirement from YouTube, only to suddenly return. At the end of February 2020, he officially announced he was quitting YouTube due to overwhelming public pressure and set his video "Thả 100 cái dao trên cao xuống" to private, but he returned after just over a month. In response to the mixed reactions, he emphasised that he said it "might" be his last video, not that it would be.

== Music Video ==
Year	Title	Collaboration with	Notes
2018	Ngừng phán xét		
2019	Không NO		Phiên bản tự sáng tác lời (Beat gốc: "Turn It Up" của Tobu) (Note: This is the music video that Nguyễn Thành Nam used to garner support from netizens. If this video gets 300,000 likes, he will release the music video "NTN - CUỘC SỐNG MÀ".)
2019	Cuộc sống mà		
2021	Không	Củ Cải 1805	
2023	Thằng Nhà Quê	Triển	

== Filmography ==
- Kẻ kiểm soát (2026)

== Awards and nominations ==
Năm	Awards Ceremony	Category	Nomination for	Result	Note
2020	WeChoice Awards	Hot YouTuber of the Year	Self	Nominated	

== See also ==
- List of YouTubers
