= Hoàng Văn Thái =

Vietnamese Army General and a communist political figure (1915–1986)

Đại tướng Hoàng Văn Thái
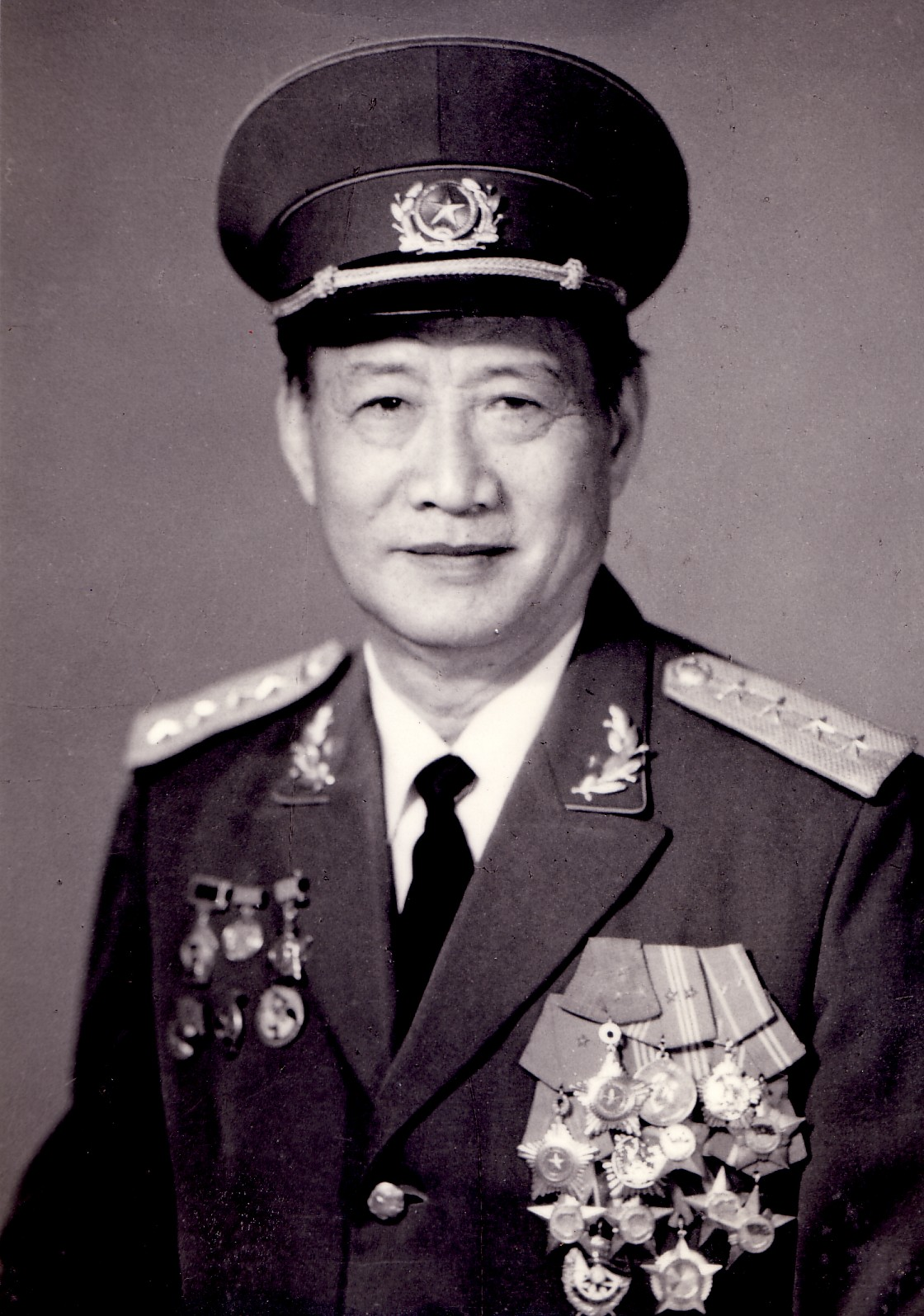
- Portrait of General Hoàng Văn Thái (1986)

1st Chairman of the Committee of Physical Training and Sports of Vietnam
- In office 1960–1965
- President: Hồ Chí Minh
- Prime Minister: Phạm Văn Đồng
- Preceded by: None
- Succeeded by: Hà Quang Dự

Vice Chairman of the State Planning Commission
- In office 1977–1980
- Preceded by: None

Deputy Minister of Ministry of Defence
- In office 1974–1986
- President: Tôn Đức Thắng; Trường Chinh
- Minister: Võ Nguyên Giáp; Văn Tiến Dũng

1st Chief of General Staff
- In office 7 September 1945 – 1953
- President: Hồ Chí Minh
- Preceded by: None
- Succeeded by: Văn Tiến Dũng
- In office 1954–1954
- Preceded by: Văn Tiến Dũng
- Succeeded by: Văn Tiến Dũng
- In office 1975 (acting)

Commander of the PLAF
- In office 1967–1973
- Preceded by: Trần Văn Trà
- Succeeded by: Trần Văn Trà

Personal details
- Born: Hoàng Văn Xiêm; 1 May 1915 An Khang, Tiền Hải, Thái Bình Province, French Indochina
- Died: 2 July 1986 (aged 71) 108 Hospital, Hanoi, Vietnam
- Spouses: Lương Thị Thanh Bình (m. 1939) Đàm Thị Loan (m. 1945)
- Awards: Gold Star Order (posthumously) See full list below for details of orders and commemorative medals awarded
- Nickname(s): Quốc Bình (1941–1944 in China); Mười Khang (1965–1973 as Viet Cong commander); Thành

Military service
- Allegiance: Việt Minh; Vietnam
- Branch/service: Vietnam People's Army; Viet Cong
- Years of service: 1941–1986
- Rank: General
- Commands: Việt Minh; Vietnam People's Army; People's Liberation Armed Forces
- Battles/wars: First Indochina War; Battle of Điện Biên Phủ; Vietnam War; Tết Offensive

Hoàng Văn Thái (Vietnamese pronunciation: [hwaːŋ˨˩ van˧˧ tʰaːj˧˦]; 1 May 1915 – 2 July 1986), born Hoàng Văn Xiêm ([hwaːŋ˨˩ van˧˧ siəm˧˧]), was a Vietnamese Army General and a communist political figure. His hometown was Tây An, Tiền Hải District, Thái Bình Province. During the 1968 Tết Offensive, he was the highest senior North Vietnamese officer in South Vietnam. He was the first chief of staff of the Vietnam People's Army, and was responsible for key military forces in North Vietnam. He was also Chief of Staff in the Battle of Điện Biên Phủ.

== Early life ==
Hoàng Văn Thái was born Hoàng Văn Xiêm, on 1 May 1915 (or 1917 since his older brother was born in 1915), in the village of An Khang (now Tay An, Tiền Hải District, Thái Bình Province). His father, Hoàng Văn Thuật, was a Han Nom teacher.

The third born of seven siblings, Hoàng Văn Thái was dedicated to studying and graduated from a French-Vietnamese colonial elementary school, however, he dropped out of school at the age of 13 because of financial difficulties; Xiêm had to work as a barber. At the age of 15, he was influenced by a Communist movement.

He opened a music class to organise young men to participate in rebellious activities. After few months, students were numbered to 170 members with himself as a secretary. Through experiences gained from secret activities, he spread leaflets clandestinely in order to encourage people to get involved against high taxes, struggling for democratic freedom

At the age 18, Hoàng Văn Thái worked in a mine in Hồng Gai in Quảng Ninh Province, he attended movements against the unfairness of the mine owners and returned to his hometown in 1936.

== Early service in military ==
In 1941, Việt Minh was founded, he became a commander of the squad National Salvation Army Bắc Sơn (Lạng Sơn). Under the name of Quoc Binh, meaning "peaceful country", several comrades and he left for military training in Liuzhou, China.

In late 1943, he met with Ho Chi Minh, then released by the Chiang Kai-shek government. After military school he returned to Vietnam with a new assumed name Hoang Van Thai (Thai stems from his hometown Thái Bình, also meaning "peaceful"), joined the resistance against Japan and then joined the August Revolution against France in 1945. He also was one of 34 soldiers led by Võ Nguyên Giáp that met on 22 December 1944 to found the Armed Propaganda Unit for National Liberation that later became the Vietnam People's Army. Thai was assigned to be in charge of propaganda and agitation of the newly organisation.

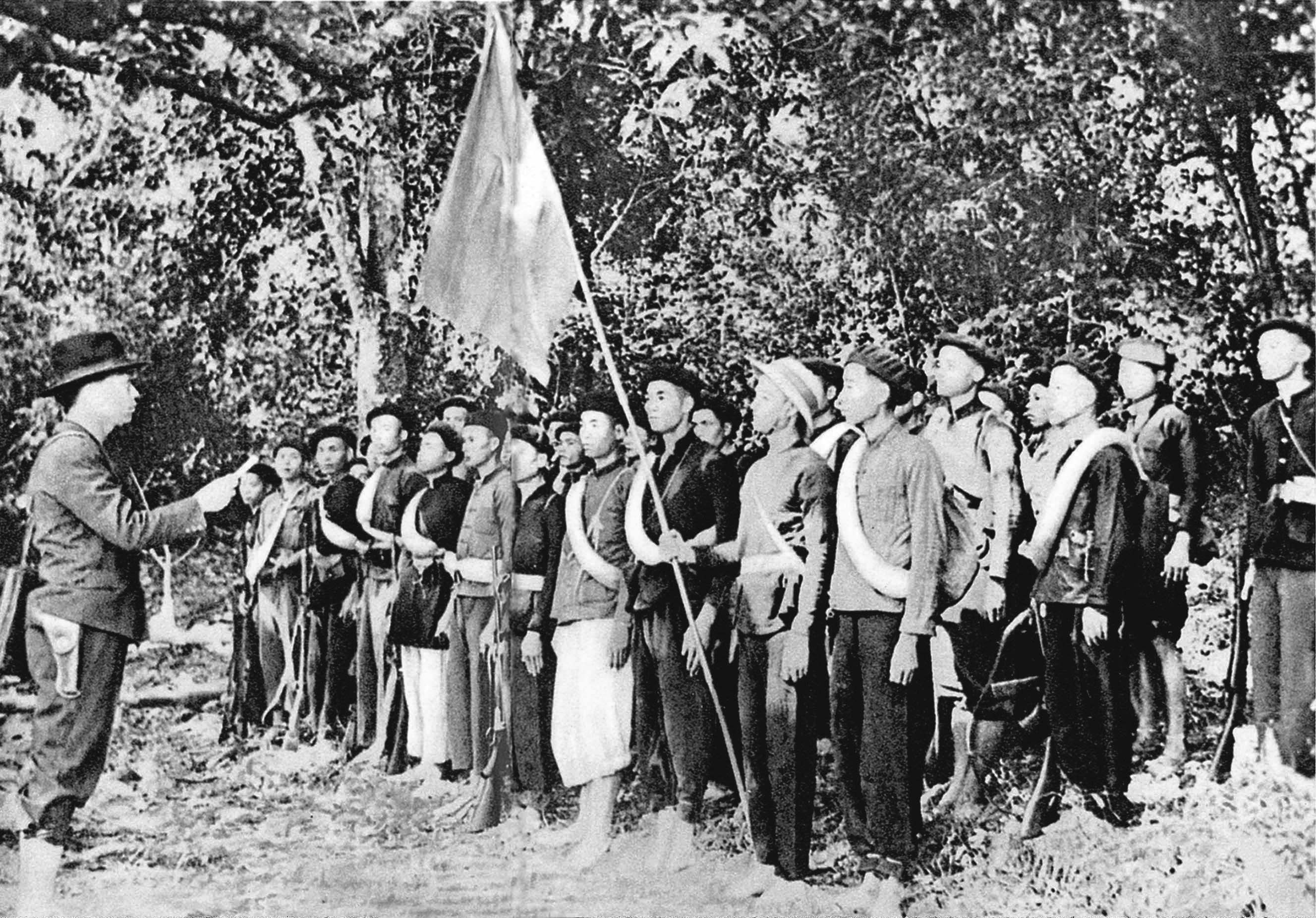
The PAVN's establishment in 1944. Hoàng Văn Thái wearing a pith helmet and holding the flag.

In March 1945, he commanded a group of 100 members to advance to Chợ Đồn District to form a foundation in the area. In the meantime, the Japanese led a coup d'état against the French authority. French units dispersed and fled to China later on. Việt Minh cadres with the help of the PAVN quickly formed a new authority and established training. Thai, subsequently, took order from Võ Nguyên Giáp to hand over the area to the local Việt Minh cadres and continued to lead members down to Cho Chu, Tuyên Quang, supporting as well as training self-defence units and political cadre groups.

In April 1945, the Northern Military Meeting determined the merging of several groups, including the Vietnam People's Army, into the Vietnam Liberation Army (Việt Nam Giải Phóng Quân). Vietnam Liberation Army was considered as the main force of Việt Minh. At the same time, the Political-Military Japanese Resistance school (Trường Quân chính kháng Nhật) was established in Tan Trao. Thai was assigned as the principal in charge of educating army staffs for the Vietnam Liberation Army.

== The First Indochina War ==
On 7 September 1945, The President of the Provisional Government of Democratic Republic of Vietnam, Ho Chi Minh mandated the foundation of a General Staff and appointed Thai as the Chief of General Staff. Under this mandate, Thai was assigned as the first Chief of General Staff of the Vietnam People's Army. (1945–1953), by President Ho Chi Minh of the Provisional Government at the age of 30.

On 22 May 1946, the National Guard was renamed as Vietnamese National Army, officially becoming a regular army placed under the control of the General Staff. In the meantime, although Ho–Sainteny agreement and Provisional 14 September agreement were signed and being active, but the French put pressure by force on the newly government to reattain French Indochina. As the Chief of General Staff of the Vietnamese National Army, Thai organised the army personnel and established armed forces as well as paramilitaries in countrysides and defence forces in cities. By the end of 1946, approximately 1 million militias were organised and trained in preparation for war while every diplomatic means failed.

When French troops provoked in Hai Phong, Thai directly commanded the front in Hai Phong from the 20th to 27th in November 1947. Vietnamese Nationwide Resistance broke out in Hanoi, Thai and Võ Nguyên Giáp were the ones that approved operational plans of the Hanoi front leader Vương Thừa Vũ. The plans proposed a firm deployment restraining the French from moving forward as well as decreasing the number of French troops in the city within 2 months.

After baffling the French attempt, on 26 August 1947, a major Division regarded as Independence Division was created. Chief of General Staff Hoang Van Thai was assigned as a commander. However, on 7 October, the French launched the Operation Léa attacking Việt Bắc base. Units that had been organised to form Division previously had to disperse into small fronts. Thai was assigned to play a role as the commander of the Route Coloniale 3 front. Eventually, Operation Léa resulted in French limited success and Vietnamese strategic victory.

In January 1948, he was promoted as one of the first Generals of Vietnam, along with: General Võ Nguyên Giáp, Lieutenant General Nguyễn Bình, and Major Generals: Nguyễn Sơn, Chu Văn Tấn, Hoàng Sâm, Trần Đại Nghĩa, Lê Hiến Mai, Văn Tiến Dũng, Trần Tử Bình, Lê Thiết Hùng, Dương Văn Dương (died in 1946).

In 1950, he was Chief of Staff of Borders campaign and the Commanding Officer in the Battle of Đông Khê, which opened the campaign.

=== Campaign in First Indochina War ===
Campaigns that Thai participated in as the Chief of General Staff (with Võ Nguyên Giáp playing the role of a commander) in the First Indochina War:

1. Operation Léa, autumn-winter 1947.
2. Battle of Route Coloniale 4, September–October 1950.
3. Battle of Vĩnh Yên, December 1950.
4. Battle of Hoang Hoa Tham, 1951.
5. Battle of Hà Nam Ninh, May 1951.
6. Battle of Hòa Bình, December 1951.
7. Battle of Northwest, September 1952.
8. Upper Laos campaign, April 1953.
9. Battle of Dien Bien Phu, March to May 1954.

=== Battle of Dien Bien Phu ===
In 1953, Major General Văn Tiến Dũng, then Commander of 320th Division, was recalled to Việt Bắc to assume the Chief of General Staff position. Thai was assigned as Deputy Chief of General Staff. In fact, he was appointed as Special Campaign Chief of Staff Điện Biên Phủ, assistant to the Commander in Chief Võ Nguyên Giáp. On 26 November 1953, he led a group of General Staff cadres to Tây Bắc.

On 30 November 1953, the group arrived in Nà Sản, he ordered the group to halt to investigate entrenched fortifications that the French had left earlier in August. The group began making operational plans in a bit later on. On 12 January 1954, Võ Nguyên Giáp's group arrived.

Following the victory of Việt Minh in Dien Bien Phu, Geneva Conference was signed, ending 80 years of French presence in Vietnam.

== In Vietnam War ==
On 31 August 1959, he was one of four people to be proposed for Colonel General rank, but he refused. He eventually was promoted to the rank of Lieutenant General.

In 1960 to 1965, he held the position of chairman of the Committee for Physical Training and Sports of the Government, which was involved in military training.

In March 1965, the first US troops were sent to Đà Nẵng, marked the official appearance of the Americans in South Vietnam. North Vietnam decided to send one of its most important seniors to the south, trying to balance the difficulty. Thai was assigned as Commander and Political Commissar of the 5th Military Region in 1966.

From 1967 to 1973, he was assigned to the South, made Commander of the People's Liberation Armed Forces and Deputy Secretary of COSVN. The US army called him a "3 legged tiger", the highest Northern commander in the South during the war years under the name of Muoi Khang.

During the time, he was the leader of First Battle of Loc Ninh Commanding Officer (27 October 1967 – 10 December 1967). Also on 30 January 1968, he was the main commander of events during the Tet offensive throughout South Vietnam under instructions from the North.

In 1975, he was North Vietnam's main architect of the plan for the general offensive on Saigon and the reunification of the country.

=== After the war ===
In 1974, he was promoted to the rank of colonel general and was appointed Deputy Minister of Defense, and First Deputy Chief of the General Staff, Standing member of the Central Military Committee. After 1975, he was also proposed to be a member of the Politburo; however, he refused.

In January 1980, he was promoted to full Army General.

He was a member of III, IV, and V Central Committee of the Communist Party of Vietnam, and a member of the VII Congress.

On 2 July 1986, he died suddenly of a heart attack at the Army Medical Institute 108 before he would have been promoted as the Minister of Defense, the first chairman of the Vietnam National Security Council (responsible for national security, home affair, and foreign policy matters. However, the position was rejected and has never been active since his death). Although he did not officially become the 7th minister of defence, Thai, in fact had been the acting minister before the transition of power that should have occurred in December 1986.

== Awards and honours ==
Streets that are named after Hoàng Văn Thái are in

- Thanh Xuân District, Hanoi
- Điện Biên Phủ, Điện Biên Province
- Phú Thọ Province
- Thái Bình, Thái Bình Province
- Tiền Hải District, Thái Bình Province
- Liên Chiểu District, Da Nang
- Nha Trang, Khánh Hòa Province
- Pleiku, Gia Lai Province
- Đồng Xoài, Bình Phước Province
- Tân Châu District, Tây Ninh Province
- District 7, Ho Chi Minh City

=== Vietnam orders and decorations ===
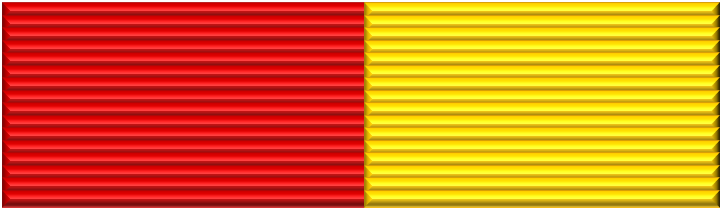
Gold Star Order (posthumously)
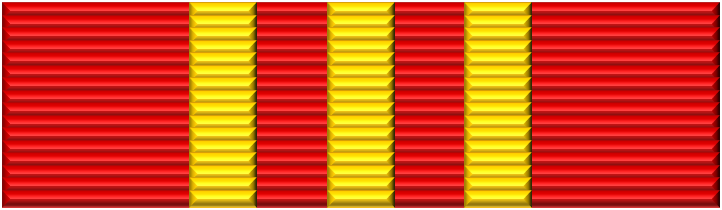
Ho Chi Minh Order
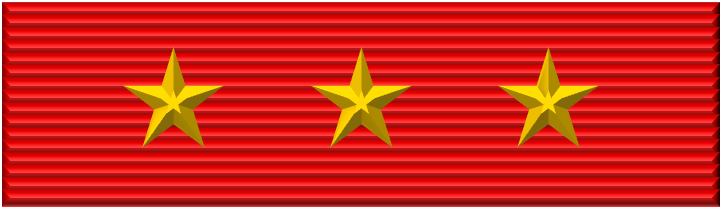
Military Exploit Order (2)
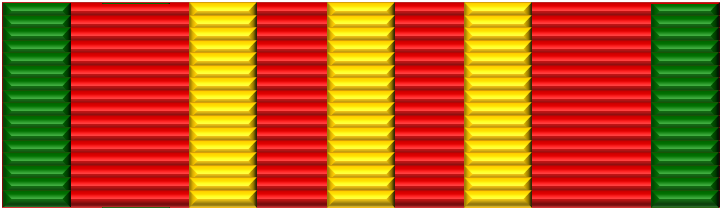
Resolution for Victory Order
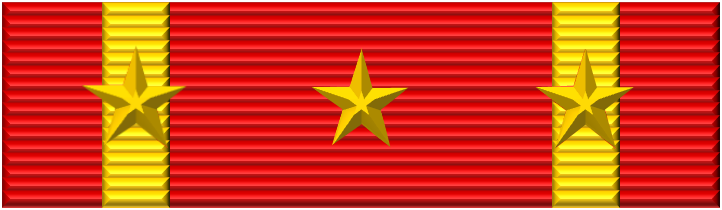
Resistance Order (2)
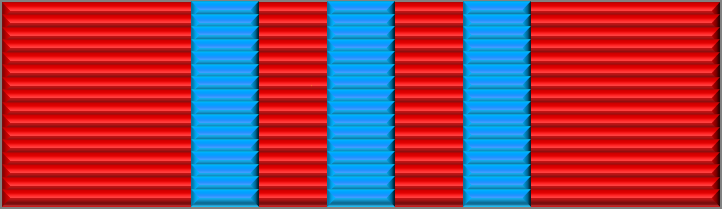
Liberation Order (3)
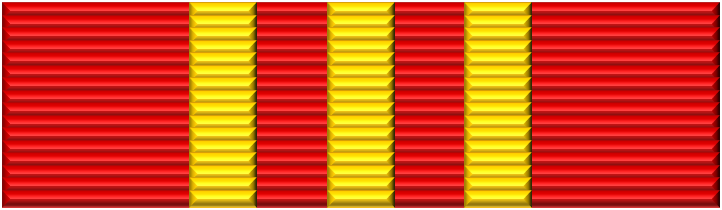
Glorious Fighter Medal (3)
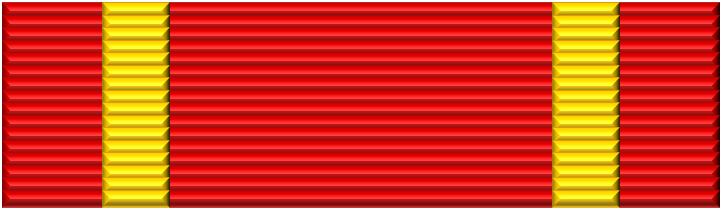
Determined-to-Win Military Flag Medal

=== Vietnam badges ===
- 40 Years Communist Party Membership Medal (1938–1978)
- "Dien Bien soldiers" badges

=== Foreign orders and decorations ===
Order of the Red Banner
USSR Brotherhood in Arms Medal
USSR Jubilee Medal
Czechoslovak Meritorious Fighters against Fascism Medal
Polish Brotherhood in Arms Medal
Laos Freedom Medal

=== Foreign badges ===
- 50th Anniversary Of The D.O.S.A.A.F.
- USSR 40 years of the Great Victory on 9 May
- 60 Years of the Armed Forces of the Mongolian People's Republic
- People's Republic of Kampuchea's Fifth Anniversary of the Seventh of January Badge

== Personal life ==
Hoàng Văn Thái's first wife was Lương Thị Thanh Bình, a native of Thái Bình Province, who was involved in revolutionary activities with Thai. They were married in 1939. In the middle of 1940, Thai was captured and taken into custody. He escaped later on with help from his wife, he then fled to Bắc Giang and used an assumed name to conceal himself. They lost touch with each other until 1946. They had 2 children.

His second wife was Đàm Thị Loan, a former Tay Lieutenant Colonel in the People's Army of Vietnam. She was one of three female soldiers in the original Vietnam Armed Propaganda Unit for National Liberation and was in the honour guard hoisting the flag of the new independent country in the Independence ceremony held at Ba Dinh Square on 2 September 1945. They married on 15 September 1945. They had 6 children.

Thai was fluent in Mandarin, as well as proficient in writing Nôm, and was known to have a good command of Tày, and Nùng. He knew a little French, Russian and English.

Thai's height was 1.75 meters (approx. 5 ft 9), higher than the average height of Vietnamese people in the 20th century.

Preceded by No	Chief of General Staff of Vietnam People's Army; 1945–1953	Succeeded by Major General Văn Tiến Dũng
Preceded by Major General Văn Tiến Dũng	Chief of General Staff of Vietnam People's Army; 1954	Succeeded by Major General Văn Tiến Dũng
