= Thái Thụy district =

Coordinates: 20.583°N 106.500°E

Thái Thụy district Huyện Thái Thụy Thụy Anh huyện
- Rural District
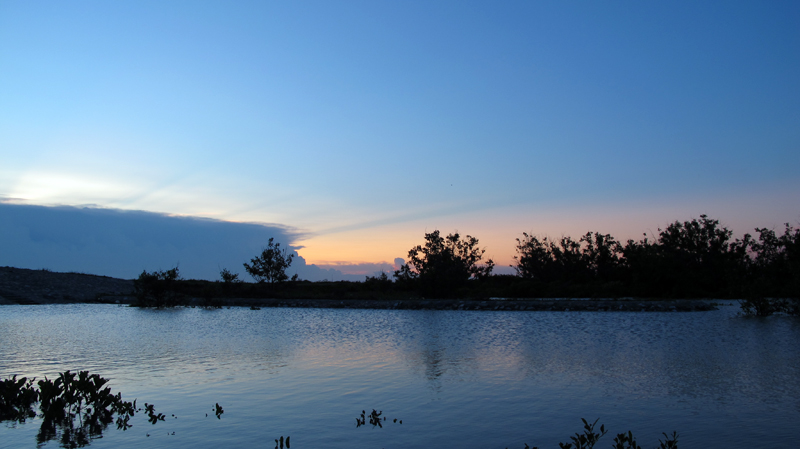
- A section of the Red River passes through Thái Thụy rural district.
- Nickname: "Estuarland" (Miền cửa sông)
- Motto: "Solidarity - Democracy - Innovation - Development" (Đoàn kết - Dân chủ - Đổi mới - Phát triển)
- Interactive map of Thái Thụy district
- Country: Vietnam
- Region: Red River Delta
- Province: Thái Bình
- Establishment: 1710(?)
- Central hall: HH87+7JJ, Diêm Điền township

Government
  - Type: Rural district
  - People Committee's Chairman: Nguyễn Văn Hóa
  - People Council's Chairman: Đỗ Văn Hiện
  - Front Committee's Chairman: Trần Thị Bích Hằng
  - Party Committee's Secretary: Trần Thị Bích Hằng

Area
  - Total: 256.83 km^{2} (99.16 sq mi)

Population (2009)
  - Total: 255,460
  - Density: 1,040/km^{2} (2,700/sq mi)
  - Ethnicities: Kinh; Tanka
- Time zone: UTC+7 (Indochina Time)
- ZIP code: 06400
- Website: Thaithuy.Thaibinh.gov.vn; Thaithuy.Thaibinh.dcs.vn

Thái Thụy ([tʰaːj˧˥:tʰwḭʔ˨˩]) is a former rural district of Thái Bình province in the Red River Delta region of Vietnam.

== History ==
=== Middle Ages ===
The previous area of Thái Thụy rural district consisted of two districts : Thái Ninh and Thụy Anh. The origin and time of the birth of these two administrative units has not been yet determined so far. However, they were first mentioned in the 6th year of Vĩnh Thịnh (1710) by Đại Việt sử ký toàn thư. (Note: Chúc Đài trụ minh văn, Cao Dương tự : "Đại Việt quốc, Sơn Nam – Hải Dương nhị xứ, Thái Bình – Nam Sách nhị phủ, Thụy Anh huyện, Cao Dương xã".)

=== 20th century ===
On June 17, 1969, Thái Ninh was merged with Thụy Anh to become Thái Thụy rural district (huyện Thái Thụy), which consisted of 47 communes.

On June 25, 1986, three communes—Thụy Lương, Thụy Hà and Thụy Hải—were urged by the Government of Vietnam to donate their land to establish Diêm Điền township (thị trấn Diêm Điền). It has begun to be used as the capital of the district since then.

=== 21st century ===
On April 13, 2018, the Ministry of Construction issued Decision 487/QĐ-BXD for the recognition of expanded Diêm Điền township (including Diêm Điền township and nine communes : Thái An, Thái Hòa, Thái Nguyên, Thái Thượng, Thụy Liên, Thụy Lương, Thụy Hà, Thụy Hải, Thụy Trình) as the class-IV municipality (Note: Đô thị loại IV.).

== Geography ==
=== Topography ===
Currently, Thái Thụy rural district is divided into 36 commune-level administrative units.

- 1 municipality : Diêm Điền capital-township.
- 35 communes : An Tân, Dương Hồng Thủy, Dương Phúc, Hòa An, Hồng Dũng, Mỹ Lộc, Sơn Hà, Tân Học, Thái Đô, Thái Giang, Thái Hưng, Thái Nguyên, Thái Phúc, Thái Thịnh, Thái Thọ, Thái Thượng, Thái Xuyên, Thuần Thành, Thụy Bình, Thụy Chính, Thụy Dân, Thụy Duyên, Thụy Hải, Thụy Hưng, Thụy Liên, Thụy Ninh, Thụy Phong, Thụy Quỳnh, Thụy Sơn, Thụy Thanh, Thụy Trình, Thụy Trường, Thụy Văn, Thụy Việt, Thụy Xuân.

Thái Thụy rural district is one of the two coastal districts of Thái Bình province. Therefore, its terrain is almost flat and there is also no mountain.

Diêm Hộ river leads the water from the Luộc river in the Northwest (where in Phù Cừ rural district) to pour into the Tonkin Gulf through Diêm Hộ estuary, thereby almost cutting Thái Thụy rural district into two zones with similar area. Besides, Thái Thụy also has the interlaced river system, making it the locality that owns the most rivers in the Northern Vietnam. That's why it is sometimes called "riverland" (miền sông nước) by the press. Such as : Diêm Hộ, Luộc, Hóa, Trà Lý.

Thái Thụy covers an area of 256.83 km^{2} (99.16 sq mi). The district capital lies at Diêm Điền. Thai Thuy is famous for Con Den beach which is far from Thai Binh city about 40 km.

=== Population ===
As of 2009 Thái Thụy rural district had a population of 255,460. In particular, all people are registered as Kẻ Kinh.

== See also ==
- Đông Hưng district
- Giao Thủy district
- Kiến Xương district
- Thủy Nguyên district
- Tiền Hải district
- Xuân Trường district
