= Nguyễn Đức Anh Quốc =

Vietnamese footballer

Personal information
- Full name: Nguyễn Đức Anh Quốc
- Date of birth: 19 July 1992 (age 34)
- Place of birth: Tiền Hải, Thái Bình, Vietnam
- Height: 1.68 m (5 ft 6 in)
- Position: Striker

Youth career
- 2004–2007: Thai Binh
- 2007–2013: Nam Định

Senior career*
Years	Team	Apps	(Gls)
2014–2018	Nam Định	51	(9)
2019–2022	Phù Đổng	9	(0)
- * Club domestic league appearances and goals as of 03 June 2018

Nguyễn Đức Anh Quốc (born 19 July 1992) is a Vietnamese footballer who plays as a striker for V.League 2 club Phù Đổng.

== Honours ==
=== Club ===
Nam Định

- V.League 2: 2017
