= Hưng Hà =

- Commune
- Interactive map of Hưng Hà
- Coordinates: 20°34′54″N 106°14′2″E
- Country: Vietnam
- Region: Red River Delta
- Province: Hưng Yên
- Established: 16 June 2025

Area
  - Total: 38.93 km^{2} (15.03 sq mi)

Population (2025)
  - Total: 54,891
  - Density: 1,410/km^{2} (3,700/sq mi)

Hưng Hà is a commune in Hưng Yên province, Vietnam. It is one of 65 communes and wards in the southern part of the province following the 2025 administrative reorganization.

On 12 June 2025, the National Assembly of Vietnam adopted Resolution No. 202/2025/QH15 on the reorganization of provincial-level administrative units (effective from 12 June 2025). Under the resolution, the entire area and population of Thái Bình province and Hưng Yên province were merged to form a new province named Hưng Yên.

On 16 June 2025:

- The National Assembly of Vietnam adopted Resolution No. 203/2025/QH15 amending and supplementing several articles of the Constitution of Vietnam (effective from 16 June 2025). Under the resolution, district-level administrative units nationwide ceased to operate from 1 July 2025.
- The Standing Committee of the National Assembly of Vietnam issued Resolution No. 1666/NQ-UBTVQH15 on the arrangement of commune-level administrative units in Hưng Yên province in 2025 (effective from 16 June 2025). Under the resolution, the entire area and population of Hưng Hà township and Kim Trung, Hồng Lĩnh, Văn Lang, Hòa Bình, Minh Khai, and Thống Nhất communes, formerly part of Hưng Hà district, were merged to form a new commune named Hưng Hà.
