= Quỳnh Phụ district =

Coordinates: 20.650°N 106.417°E

Quỳnh Phụ district Huyện Quỳnh Phụ
- Rural District
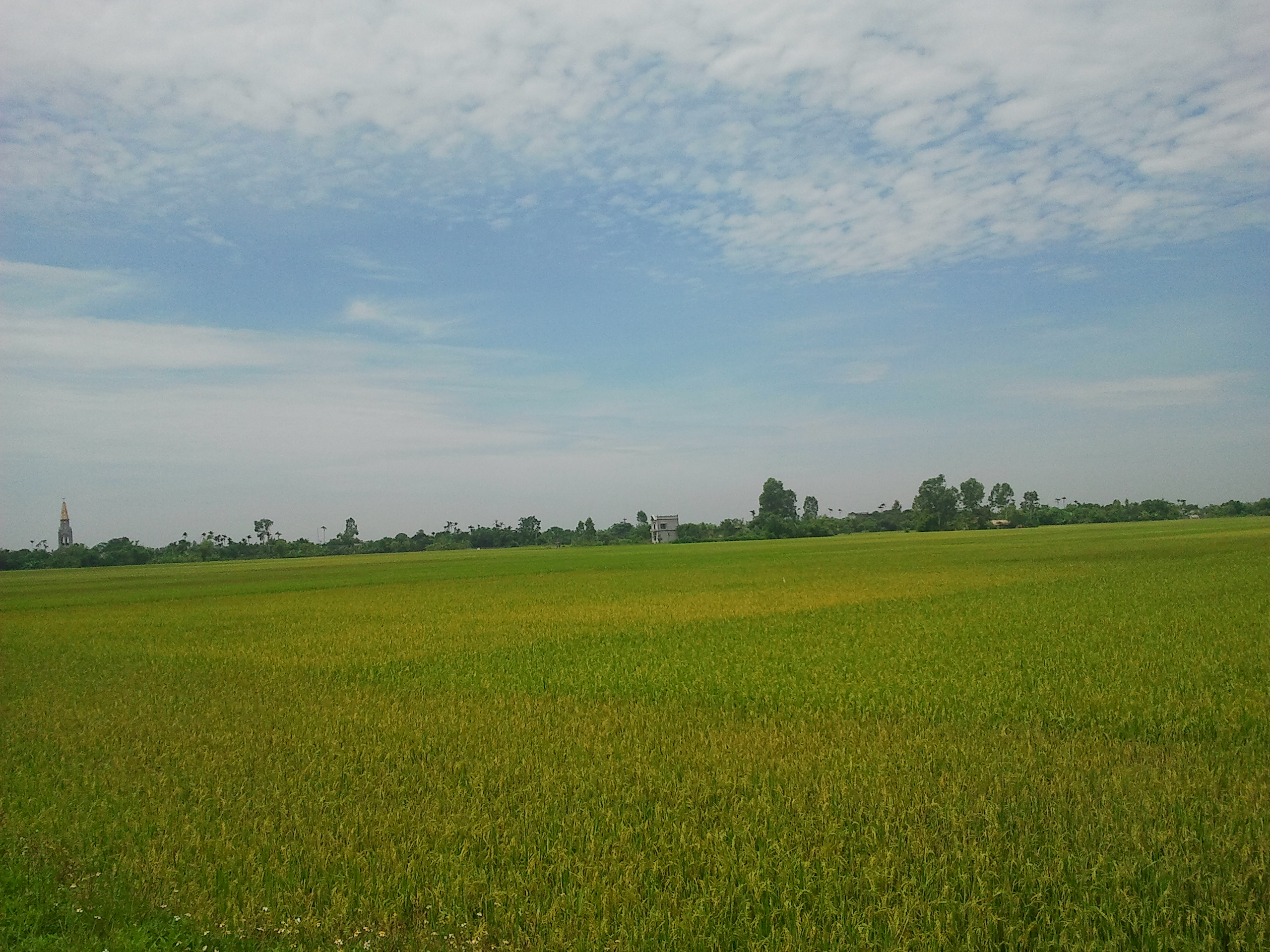
- A wet rice field in Quỳnh Phụ rural district.
- Interactive map of Quỳnh Phụ district
- Country: Vietnam
- Region: Red River Delta
- Province: Thái Bình
- Central hall: No.215, Trần Hưng Đạo road, Quỳnh Côi township

Government
  - Type: Rural district

Area
  - Total: 207 km^{2} (80 sq mi)

Population (2003)
  - Total: 247,793
- Time zone: UTC+7 (Indochina Time)
- ZIP code: 1000436341-007 (Note: An official code from 2022 to present.)

Quỳnh Phụ is a former rural district of Thái Bình province in the Red River Delta region of Vietnam.

== Geography ==
As of 2003, the district had a population of 247,793. The district covers an area of 207 km^{2}. The district capital lies at Quỳnh Côi.

== See also ==
- Vũ Thư district
- Phù Cừ district
