= Vũ Thư district =

Coordinates: 20.417°N 106.283°E

Vũ Thư district Huyện Vũ Thư
- Rural District
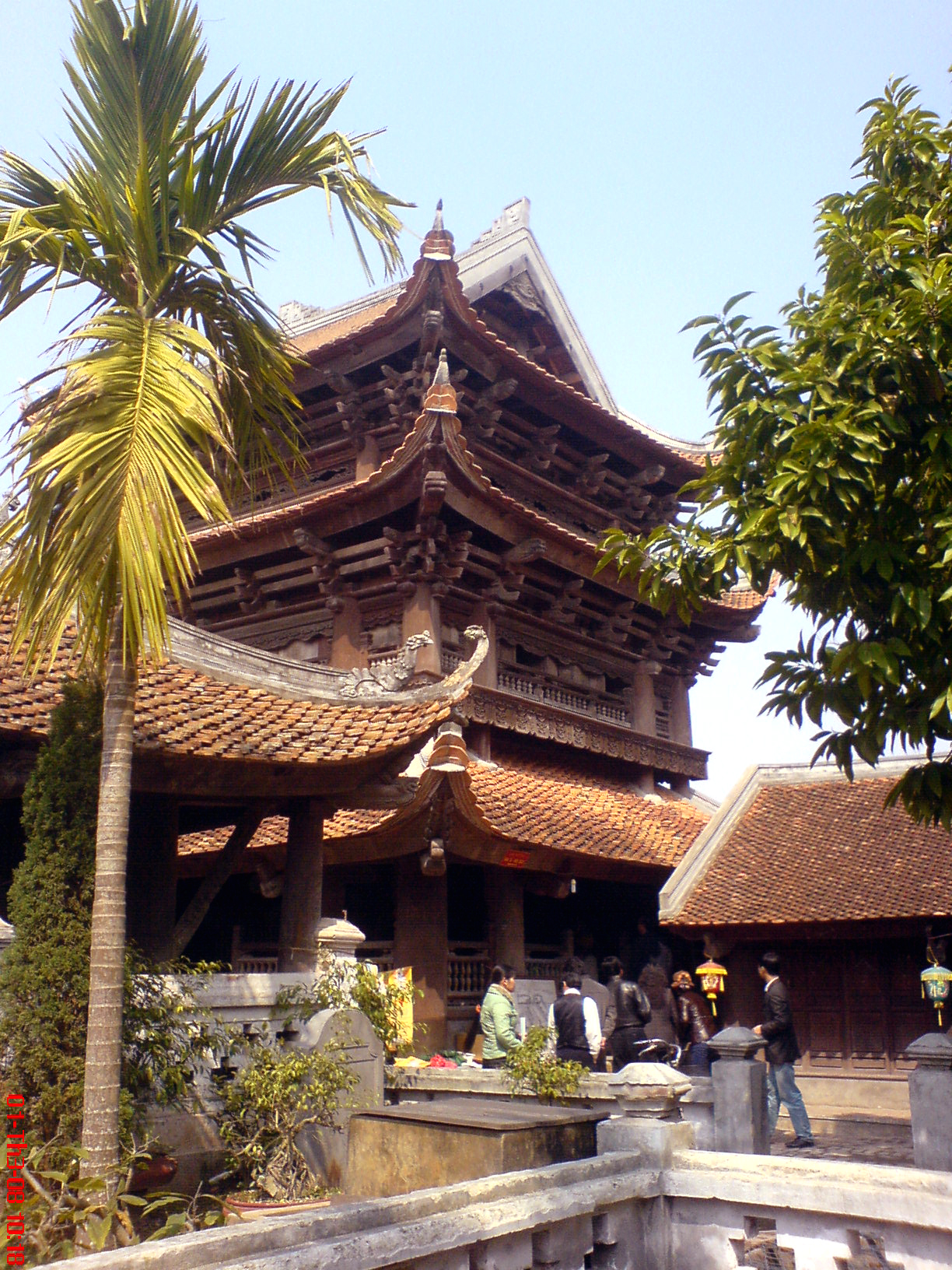
- View of Thần Quang Pagoda.
- Interactive map of Vũ Thư district
- Country: Vietnam
- Region: Red River Delta
- Province: Thái Bình
- Central hall: Vũ Thư township

Area
  - Total: 75.35 sq mi (195.16 km^{2})

Population (2023)
  - Total: 230,418
- Time zone: UTC+07:00 (Indochina Time)

Vũ Thư is a rural district of Thái Bình province in the Red River Delta region of Vietnam.

== Geography ==
Vũ Thư District is located in the west of Thái Bình Province, about 7 km west of Thái Bình city, and about 117 km from the center of Hanoi, with the following geographical boundaries:

- To the east, it borders Thái Bình city and Kiến Xương District.
- To the west, it borders Lý Nhân District, Hà Nam Province; Nam Trực District and Nam Định city, Nam Định Province (the boundary is the Red River).
- To the south, it borders Xuân Trường District and Trực Ninh District of Nam Định Province (the boundary is the Red River).
- To the north, it borders Hưng Hà District and Đông Hưng District.

Vũ Thư District has a natural area of about 195.1618 km^{2} and a population of about 230,418 people (2023). The district capital lies at Vũ Thư.
