= Thái Bình (city) =

- Provincial city (Class-2)
- Thái Bình City; Thành phố Thái Bình
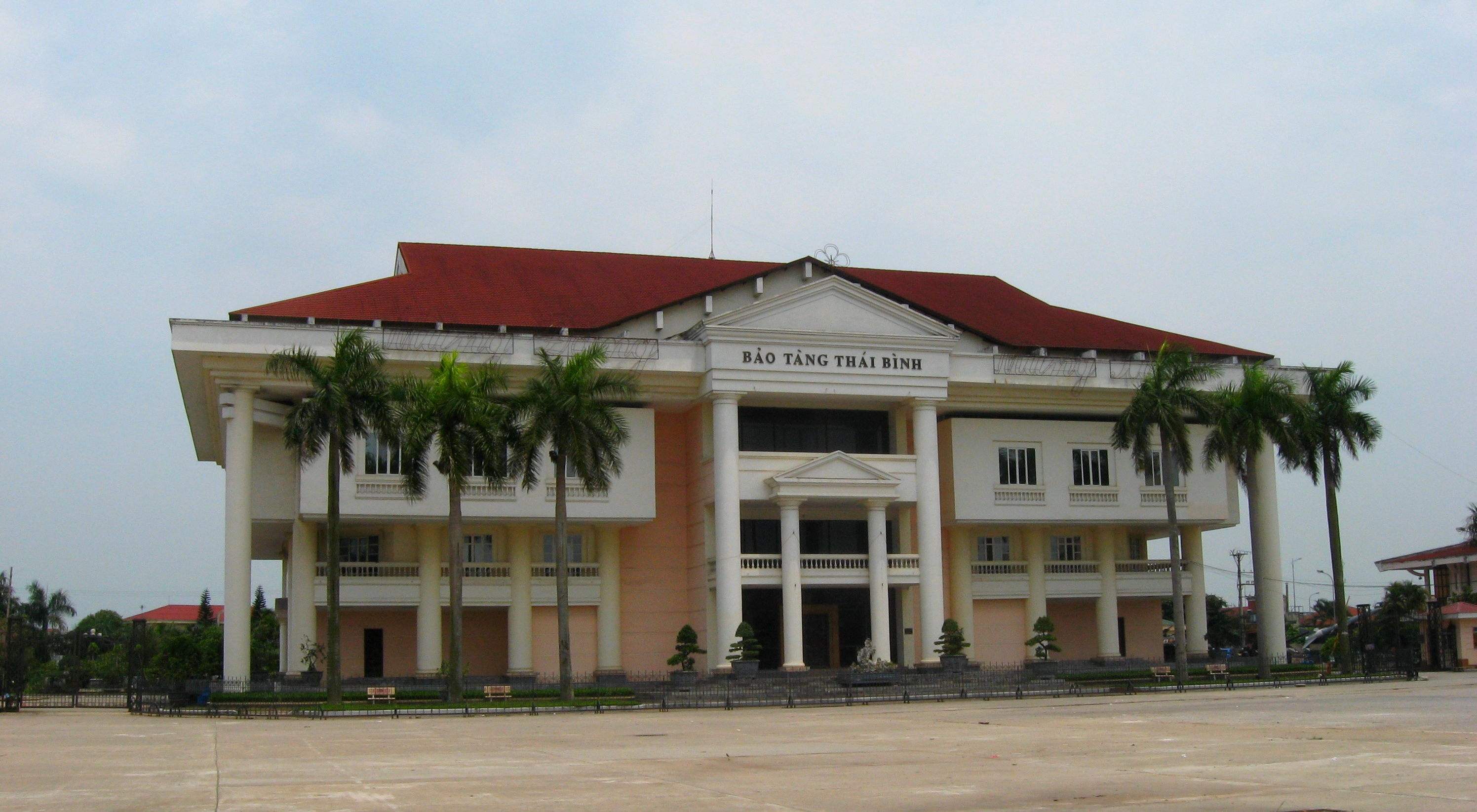
- Thái Bình Provincial Museum in Thái Bình City
- Interactive map of Thái Bình
- Location of Thái Bình in Vietnam Thái Bình (Southeast Asia) Thái Bình (Asia)
- Coordinates: 20°26′46″N 106°20′32″E
- Country: Vietnam
- Province: Thái Bình
- Established: 29 April 2004

Area
  - Total: 67.7135 km^{2} (26.1443 sq mi)

Population (2019)
  - Total: 206,037
  - Density: 3,043/km^{2} (7,880/sq mi)
- Climate: Cwa
- Website: thanhpho.thaibinh.gov.vn

Thái Bình is a city in the Red River Delta of Northern Vietnam. It was the capital of Thái Bình Province (now merged into Hưng Yên province). The city is located 110 km from Hanoi. The city area is 67.7 square km, with a population of 206,037 people (2019).

== Geography ==
Thái Bình City is located in the central part of the province, 110 km southeast of Hanoi, 60 km southwest of Hai Phong, and 19 km east of Nam Định. Its geographical boundaries are:

- To the southeast and south, it borders Kiến Xương District.
- To the west and southwest, it borders Vũ Thư District.
- To the north, it borders Đông Hưng District.

Thái Bình City is a flat area with an elevation of 2.6 m. The Trà Lý River flows through it for a length of 6.7 km, and there is an upgraded and reinforced system of canals. The soil here originated from coastal dunes and sandbanks but has been enriched with alluvium, making it very suitable for rice cultivation and vegetable crops. The area is also geologically stable, suitable for developing industries or constructing high-rise buildings.

== History ==
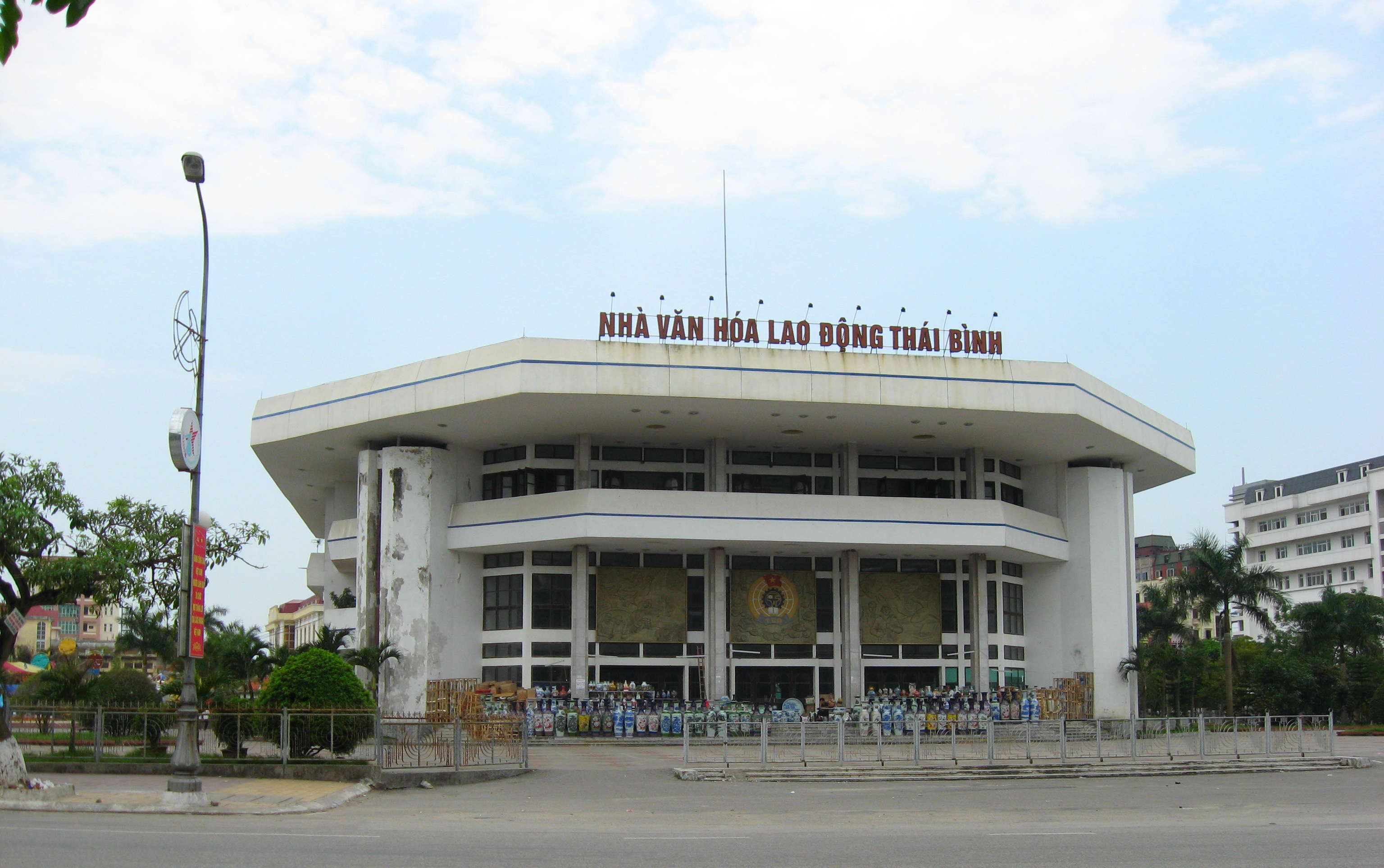
The Workers' House of Culture

In the 10th century, the area was the domain of the Tran clan, which rose in power to become the Trần Dynasty of Vietnam in the early 13th century. The town Thái Bình (Sino-Vietnamese: 太平) developed near the Keo Pagoda constructed in 1061.

Before the prime minister declared it a city in June 2004, Thai Binh was officially a town. The city is the center of economics and culture in its province. Thai Binh Medical College is considered one of the highest quality medical colleges in Vietnam.

== Climate ==
Located in a humid subtropical climate zone, a coastal microclimate, the city has two distinct seasons: a hot, humid, rainy season lasting from April to October, and a dry, less rainy season for the rest of the year. The average temperature here is 23 °C, with average rainfall ranging from 1,500-1,900mm, air humidity fluctuating between 70-90%, and about 1,600-1,800 hours of sunshine per year.

Climate data for Thái Bình
Month	Jan	Feb	Mar	Apr	May	Jun	Jul	Aug	Sep	Oct	Nov	Dec	Year
Record high °C (°F)	31.7 (89.1)	34.6 (94.3)	35.9 (96.6)	39.0 (102.2)	38.2 (100.8)	39.4 (102.9)	39.2 (102.6)	38.0 (100.4)	36.3 (97.3)	34.5 (94.1)	32.6 (90.7)	30.1 (86.2)	39.4 (102.9)
Mean daily maximum °C (°F)	19.4 (66.9)	19.7 (67.5)	22.1 (71.8)	26.3 (79.3)	30.5 (86.9)	32.5 (90.5)	32.5 (90.5)	31.6 (88.9)	30.4 (86.7)	28.4 (83.1)	25.3 (77.5)	21.7 (71.1)	26.7 (80.1)
Daily mean °C (°F)	16.3 (61.3)	17.2 (63.0)	19.6 (67.3)	23.4 (74.1)	27.0 (80.6)	28.8 (83.8)	29.2 (84.6)	28.4 (83.1)	27.1 (80.8)	24.6 (76.3)	21.4 (70.5)	17.9 (64.2)	23.4 (74.1)
Mean daily minimum °C (°F)	14.2 (57.6)	15.5 (59.9)	17.9 (64.2)	21.5 (70.7)	24.5 (76.1)	26.2 (79.2)	26.7 (80.1)	25.9 (78.6)	24.6 (76.3)	21.9 (71.4)	18.5 (65.3)	15.1 (59.2)	21.0 (69.8)
Record low °C (°F)	4.1 (39.4)	5.5 (41.9)	6.7 (44.1)	12.8 (55.0)	16.9 (62.4)	19.4 (66.9)	21.9 (71.4)	21.6 (70.9)	16.5 (61.7)	11.6 (52.9)	9.1 (48.4)	4.4 (39.9)	4.1 (39.4)
Average rainfall mm (inches)	29.3 (1.15)	25.5 (1.00)	46.9 (1.85)	78.4 (3.09)	159.9 (6.30)	186.8 (7.35)	223.8 (8.81)	302.0 (11.89)	329.5 (12.97)	203.7 (8.02)	69.0 (2.72)	25.5 (1.00)	1,680.3 (66.15)
Average rainy days	9.4	13.1	16.5	12.6	12.4	12.6	12.7	15.8	15.1	11.8	7.7	6.3	146.1
Average relative humidity (%)	85.5	88.6	90.3	90.0	86.5	83.5	82.8	86.8	87.0	84.6	82.6	82.5	85.9
Mean monthly sunshine hours	68.9	39.8	38.9	90.0	190.0	184.2	203.6	170.2	170.2	161.8	135.8	111.8	1,556.5
Source: Vietnam Institute for Building Science and Technology

== Administration ==
Thái Bình city has 19 administrative units at the commune level, including 10 wards (phường): Bồ Xuyên, Đề Thám, Hoàng Diệu, Kỳ Bá, Lê Hồng Phong, Phú Khánh, Quang Trung, Tiền Phong, Trần Hưng Đạo, Trần Lãm and 9 communes: Đông Hoà, Đông Mỹ, Đông Thọ, Phú Xuân, Tân Bình, Vũ Chính, Vũ Đông, Vũ Lạc, Vũ Phúc.
