= Bùi Viện Street =

Street in Ho Chi Minh City

- Bùi Viện Pedestrian Street, Backpacker Street (Phố Tây)
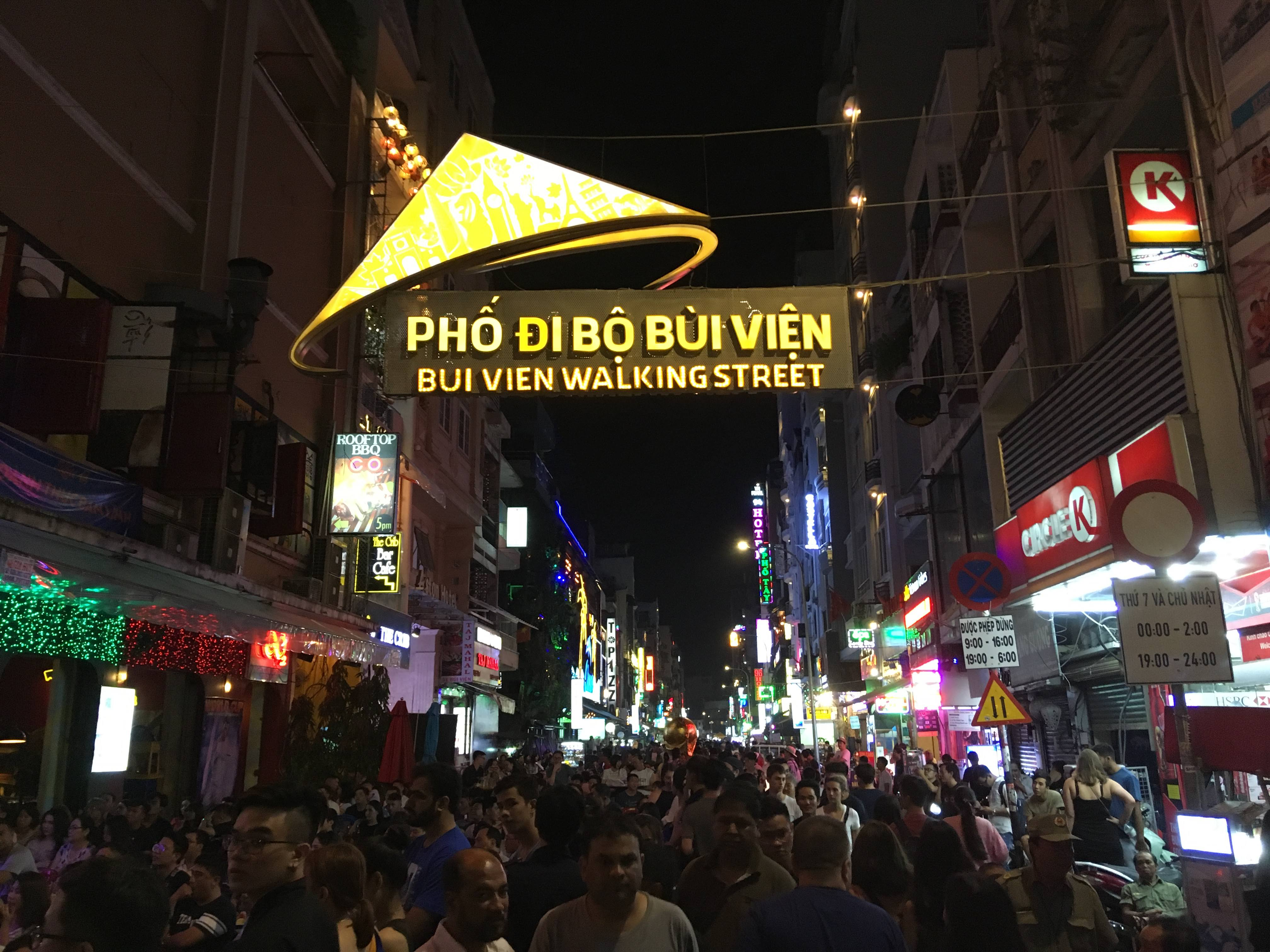
- East entrance gate on Trần Hưng Đạo Boulevard
- Interactive map of Bùi Viện Street
- Native name: Đường Bùi Viện, Phố đi bộ Bùi Viện (Vietnamese)
- Former name: Bảo Hộ Thoại Street (1950–1955)
- Namesake: Bùi Viện
- Type: Pedestrian street
- Length: 652 m (2,139 ft)
- Location: Bến Thành, District 1, Ho Chi Minh City
- Coordinates: 10.767421°N 106.693979°E
- Major junctions: Phạm Ngũ Lão – Đề Thám – Bùi Viện (International crossroads)
- East: Trần Hưng Đạo Boulevard
- West: Cống Quỳnh Street

Bùi Viện Street is a small street in Bến Thành, Ho Chi Minh City. This is the city's famous nightlife street with many small bars, nightclubs and beer gardens, specializing in affordable tourist goods and services.

== Location ==
Bùi Viện Street east entrace

The street starts at Y-junction with Trần Hưng Đạo Boulevard in the east, next to crossroads of Trần Hưng Đạo – Nguyễn Thái Học, intersects with Đề Thám and Đỗ Quang Đẩu then ends at T-junction Cống Quỳnh street in the west. The area including streets of Bùi Viện, Đề Thám, Phạm Ngũ Lão and Đỗ Quang Đẩu is popularized as 'International Crossroads' (Ngã tư Quốc Tế) in the past and 'Backpacker Quarter' (Phố Tây ba lô) in modern times.

== History ==
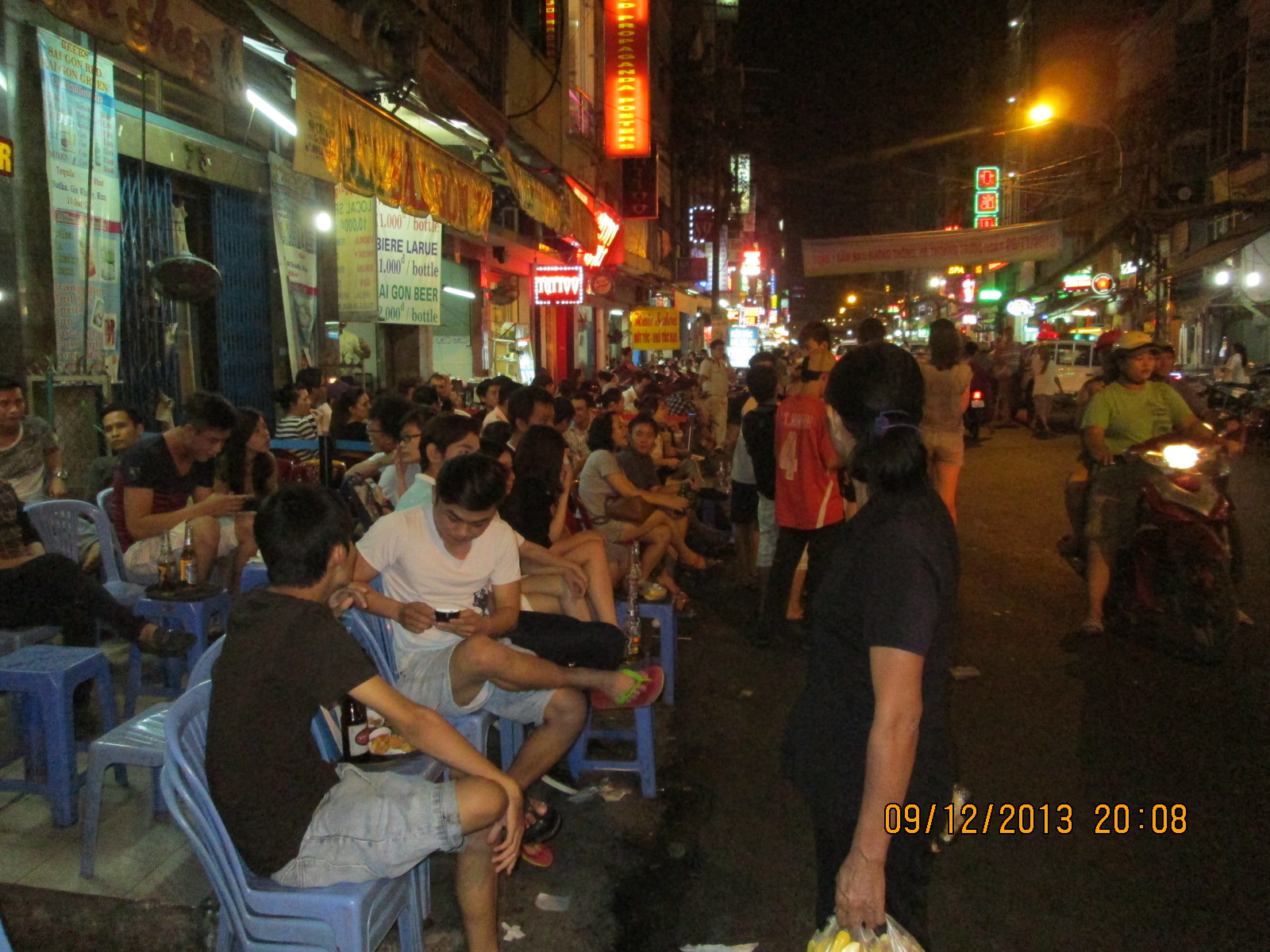
Bùi Viện Street at night in 2013, before renovation

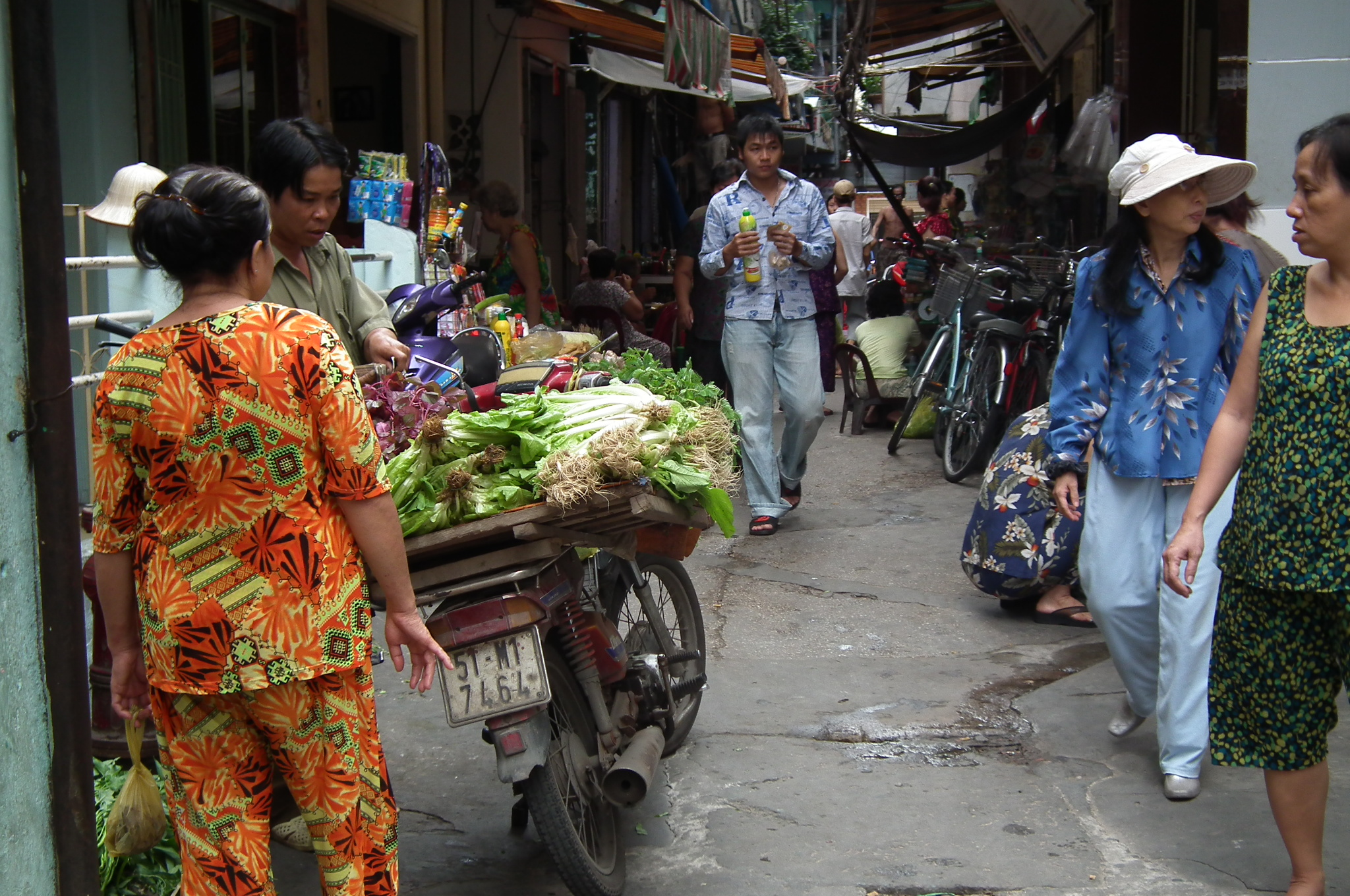
Bùi Viện street life in daylight

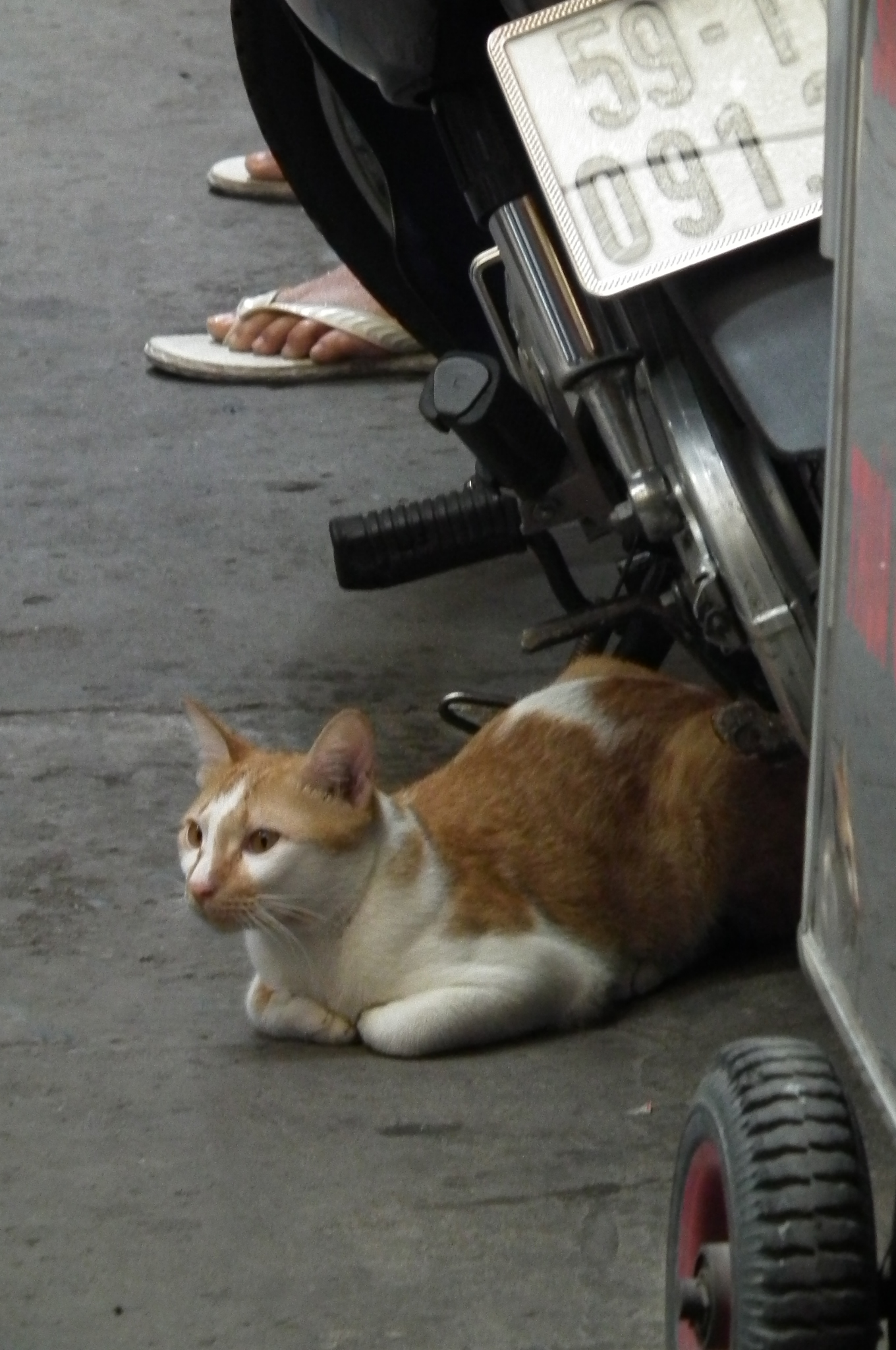
An orange-blotched tabby-and-white cat lying on the alley of the street

Before 1949, this was the trail of Tân Hòa village. In 1950, the State of Vietnam named it as Bảo Hộ Thoại Street. Until 1955, the government of South Vietnam renamed it into Bùi Viện Street, named after the Vietnamese reformer and diplomat of the late 19th century Bùi Viện, and it has been kept until now.

In South Vietnam period, the area of Phạm Ngũ Lão, Đề Thám and Bùi Viện street was nicknamed as 'International Crossroads' (Ngã tư quốc tế), as it was home to many print shops and newsrooms, also there was some popular theaters around this area like Nguyễn Văn Hảo, Hưng Đạo (now is Công Nhân [vi] and Trần Hữu Trang Theatre [vi], respectively) with many coffee shops that celebrities or even locals usually come so celebrities can be easy to be spotted here, everyone gossips to each other and journalists can easily collect news here.

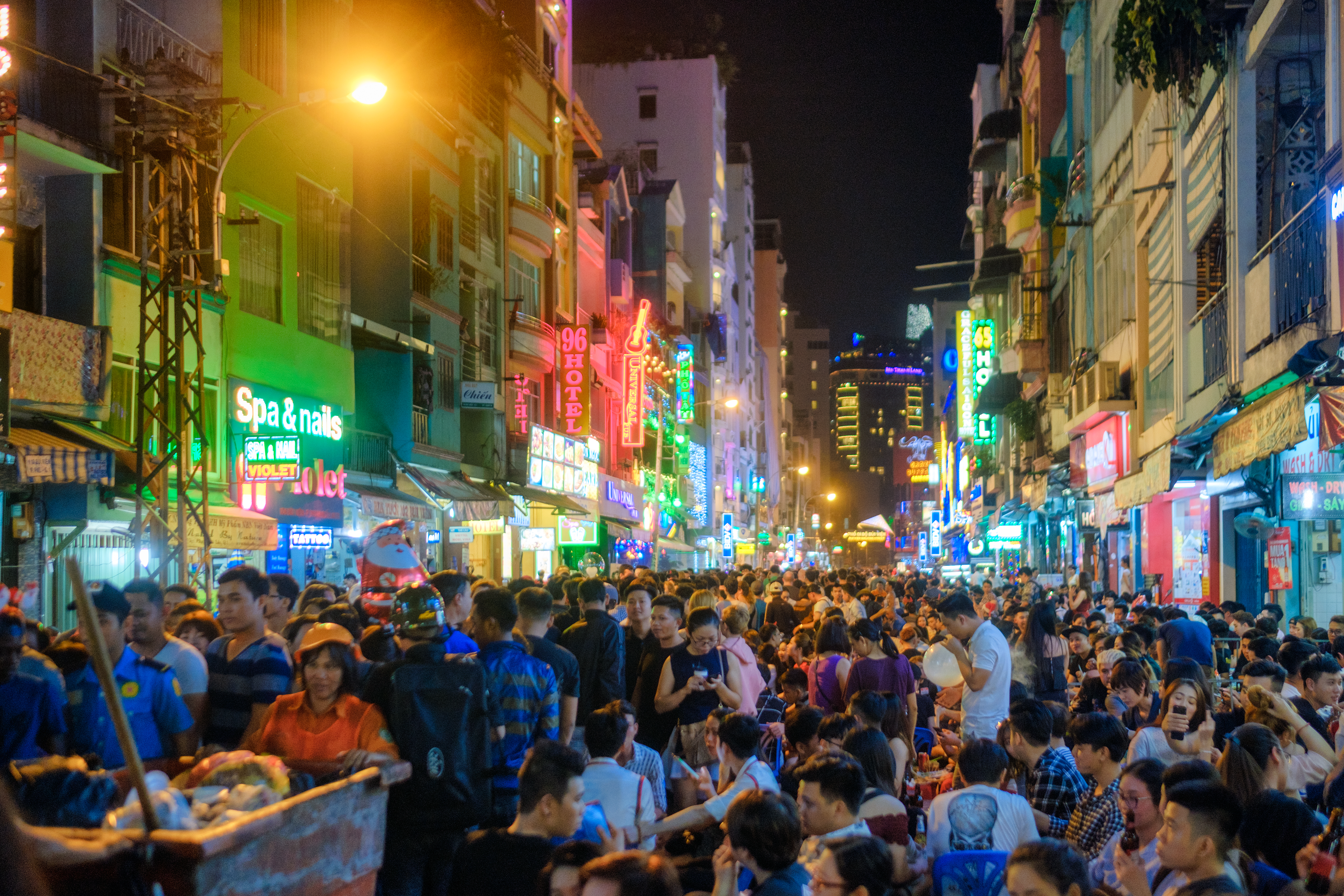
Bùi Viện Street in 2017, toward Bitexco Financial Tower and Bến Thành Tower, shortly after renovating into pedestrian street

In 2017, Ho Chi Minh City was implementing the construction of Bùi Viện Street into a walking street. The entire route is being renovated and upgraded with sidewalks, roadways, lighting systems, and drainage. Bùi Viện Walking Street officially opened on 20 August 2017 and is the second pedestrian street in Ho Chi Minh City, after Nguyễn Huệ Boulevard, vehicles are prohibited on Saturday and Sunday in the time of 7 P.M til 2 A.M of the next day same with Nguyễn Huệ Boulevard.

== Criticism ==
Bùi Viện Street has faced criticism for its atmosphere and cultural identity. It is described as an area with nightclubs, sidewalk use, and activities such as the sale of laughing gas or the sex industry, though less in recent years. Sound pollution and a lack of traditional experiences have affected the presence of locals and tourists, leading to the designation "poisoning street" (phố đầu độc).

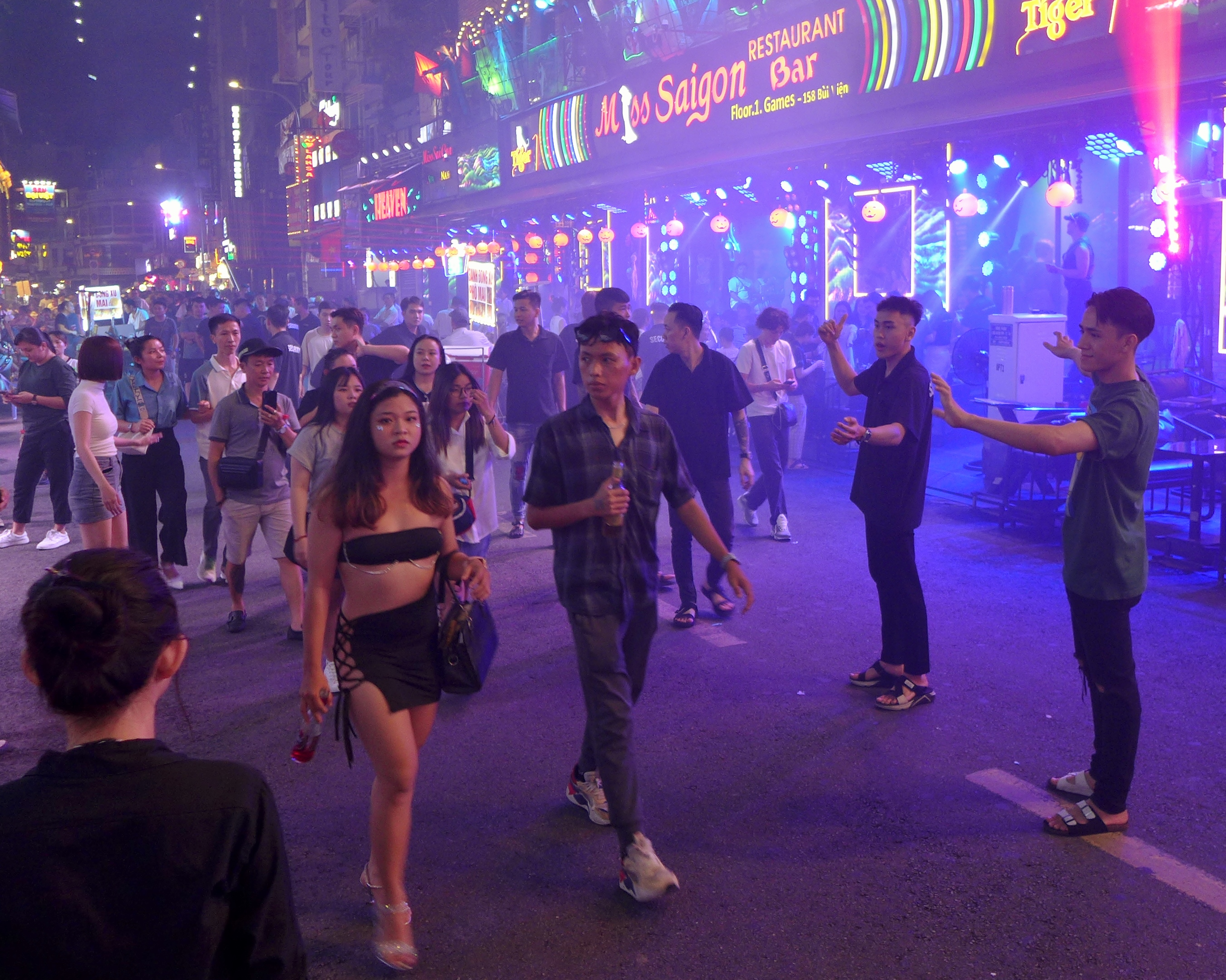
Bùi Viện street with chaotic lights and noise from the nightclubs at night in 2023

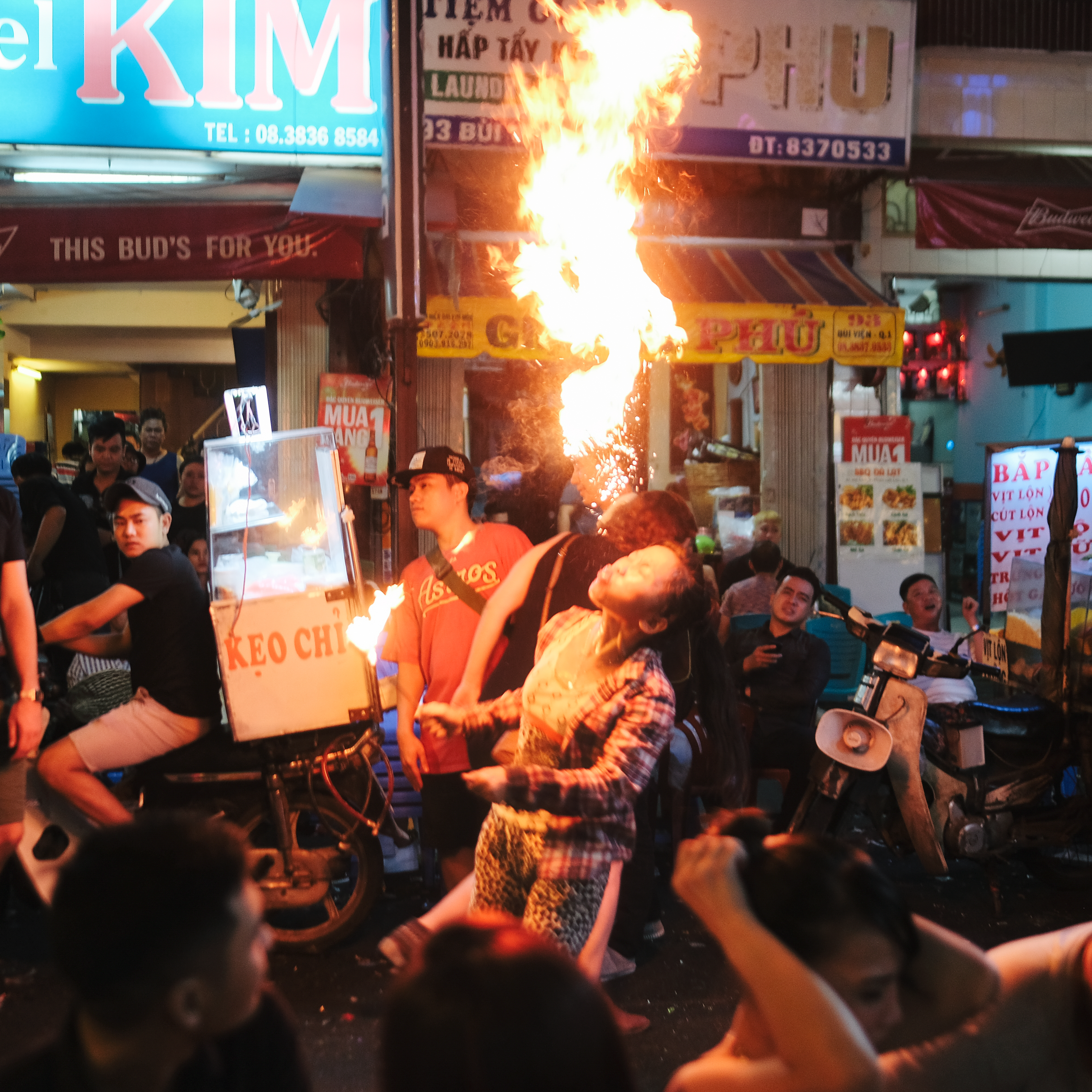
A woman doing fire breathing on the street

== Public transport ==
There are several ways to access Bùi Viện Street via public transport, the italics one are on proposed:

- Public bus: Route 01, 03, 13, 156V, 36.
- HCMC Metro: Line 1 (Ben Thanh station, Thái Bình Market station), Line 3 (Từ Dũ station)

== See also ==
- Phạm Ngũ Lão Street
