= Kiến Xương district =

Coordinates: 20.417°N 106.417°E

Kiến Xương district Huyện Kiến Xương
- Rural District
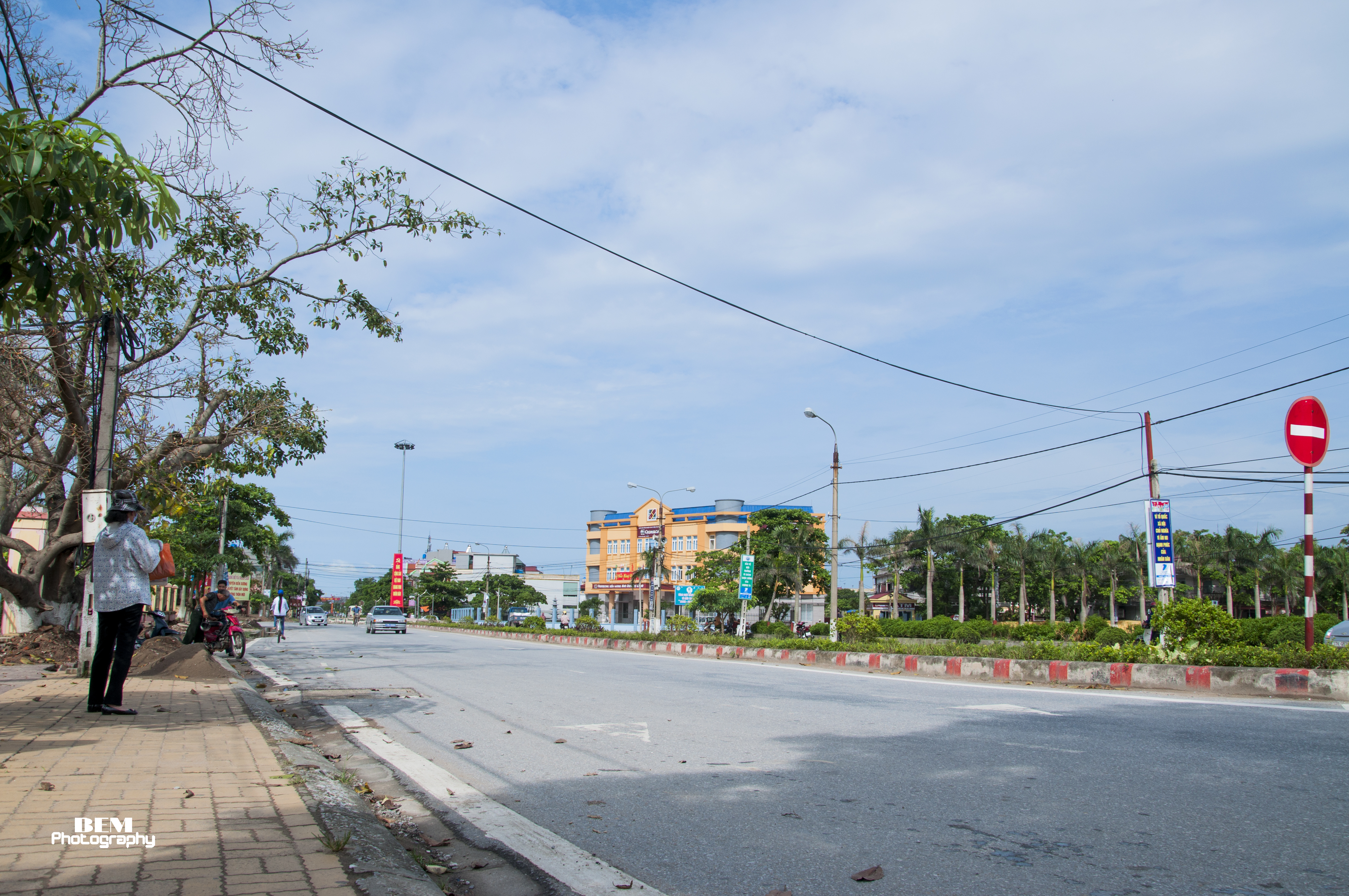
- A corner of Kiến Xương township on May 30, 2013.
- Interactive map of Kiến Xương district
- Country: Vietnam
- Region: Red River Delta
- Province: Thái Bình
- Establishment: IX century
- Central hall: 9CVR+2HX, Bình Minh commune

Government
  - Type: Rural district
  - People Committee's Chairman: Hoàng Việt Huy
  - People Council's Chairman: Hoàng Việt Huy
  - Front Committee's Chairman: Phan Văn Dương
  - Party Committee's Secretary: Vũ Xuân Thành

Area
  - Rural District: 202 km^{2} (78 sq mi)

Population (December 31, 2022)
  - Rural District: 219,238
  - Density: 1,090/km^{2} (2,810/sq mi)
  - Urban: 17,000
  - Metro: 211,179
  - Ethnicities: Kinh; Tanka
- Time zone: UTC+7 (Indochina Time)
- ZIP code: 410000-062 (Note: An official code from 2022 to present.)
- Website: Kienxuong.Thaibinh.gov.vn; Kienxuong.Thaibinh.dcs.vn

Kiến Xương [kiən˧˥:sɨəŋ˧˧] is a rural district of Thái Bình province in the Red River Delta region of Vietnam.

== History ==
=== Middle Ages ===
According to An Nam chí lược, An Nam chí nguyên and Đại Việt sử ký toàn thư, from the Tang to the Revival Lê dynasty, the area of Kiến Xương was originally the Northern part of Chân Định rural district (真定縣, Chân Định huyện), (Note: The administrative unit included the area of the modern-rural districts Giao Thủy, Kiến Xương, Tiền Hải and Xuân Trường.) which was separated from the Southern part by the downstream of the Red River. It belonged to Kiến Xương prefecture (Kiến Xương phủ), Sơn Nam garrison (Sơn Nam trấn).

In 1832, Emperor Minh Mệnh issued an order to dissolve Sơn Nam garrison to be replaced by Nam Định province. (Note: Mục lục châu ban triều Nguyễn - Volume 2 - Page 485 Châu ban triều Nguyễn, Jinghe Chen, Đại học quốc gia Hà Nội. Trung tâm nghiên cứu Việt Nam và giao lưu văn hóa - 2000 "I have told the Protector of Nam Định to order the Chiefs of Kiến Xương Prefecture and Chân Định District to stick notices everywhere so that the people can still enjoy their peaceful life and at the same time watch out for the outlaws".) However, by 1890 under the reign of Emperor Thành Thái, Chân Định was renamed Trực Định rural district (直定縣, Trực Định huyện), (Note: To avoid real name Nguyễn Phước Ưng Chân of Emperor Dục Đức.) belonging to Kiến Xương prefecture, Thái Bình province.

=== 20th century ===
In 1946, the Government of the Democratic Republic of Vietnam dissolved the prefecture regime to advance for the establishment of Kiến Xương rural district (huyện Kiến Xương; 建昌縣), part of Thái Bình province.

However, under the State of Vietnam regime, the name was changed to Kiến Xương district (quận Kiến Xương; 建昌郡), still part of Thái Bình province.

On June 8, 1988, according to Decision 102-HĐBT (Note: Quyết định 102-HĐBT năm 1988 về việc thành lập thị trấn Kiến Xương của huyện Kiến Xương thuộc tỉnh Thái Bình.) of the Council of Ministers, Kiến Xương township (thị trấn Kiến Xương) was officially established in the area of hamlets Quang Trung and Tân Tiến, both part of Tán Thuật commune.

=== 21st century ===
On April 12, 2002, according to Decree 45/2002/NĐ-CP of the Government of Vietnam, Kiến Xương township and Tán Thuật commune were consolidated to establish Thanh Nê township (thị trấn Thanh Nê). (Note: Nghị định 45/2002/NĐ-CP về việc thành lập các phường thuộc thị xã Thái Bình và thị trấn Thanh Nê thuộc huyện Kiến Xương, tỉnh Thái Bình.)

== Geography ==
Currently, Kiến Xương rural district is divided into 29 commune-level administrative units.

- 1 municipality : Kiến Xương township.
- 28 communes : An Bình, Bình Định, Bình Minh (district's capital), Bình Nguyên, Bình Thanh, Hòa Bình, Hồng Thái, Hồng Tiến, Hồng Vũ, Lê Lợi, Minh Quang, Minh Tân, Nam Bình, Quang Bình, Quang Lịch, Quang Minh, Quang Trung, Quốc Tuấn, Tây Sơn, Thanh Tân, Thống Nhất, Trà Giang, Vũ An, Vũ Công, Vũ Lễ, Vũ Ninh, Vũ Quý, Vũ Trung.

The previous capital of Kiến Xương was Kiến Xương township, but since 2023 it has been moved to Bình Minh commune.

== See also ==
- Đông Hưng district
- Giao Thủy district
- Tiền Hải district
- Vũ Thư district
- Xuân Trường district
