= Đồng Xâm =

Đồng Xâm is a traditional silver-carving village in Thái Bình Province, Vietnam. The silver-carving business in the village are facing issued with the pollution caused by silver-carving and a lack of markets to sell their products.
