= Bùi Viện =

Vietnamese reformer and diplomat

Bùi Viện (裴援; 1839–1878) was a Vietnamese reformer and diplomat of the late 19th century, served under the Nguyễn dynasty. He was considered the first person from Vietnam to travel to the United States. He was sent by the Vietnamese government in 1873, in hopes of obtaining American support against France's invasion of Tonkin.

Viện was born into an educated, but poor, family in Thái Bình Province in the Red River Delta. As a boy, he lived among fisherman and merchants, learning whatever he could from them. The knowledge he acquired at a young age proved to be quite impactful as it eventually led to an impressive career in the fine arts.

To dedicated his legacy, major cities over the nation has named many streets and placenames after him, one of the most notable is Bùi Viện Street in Ho Chi Minh City, the street is described as one of the most bustling street in the city and a quarter for backpacker.
