= Đàm Thị Loan =

Đàm Thị Loan Đàm Thị Nết
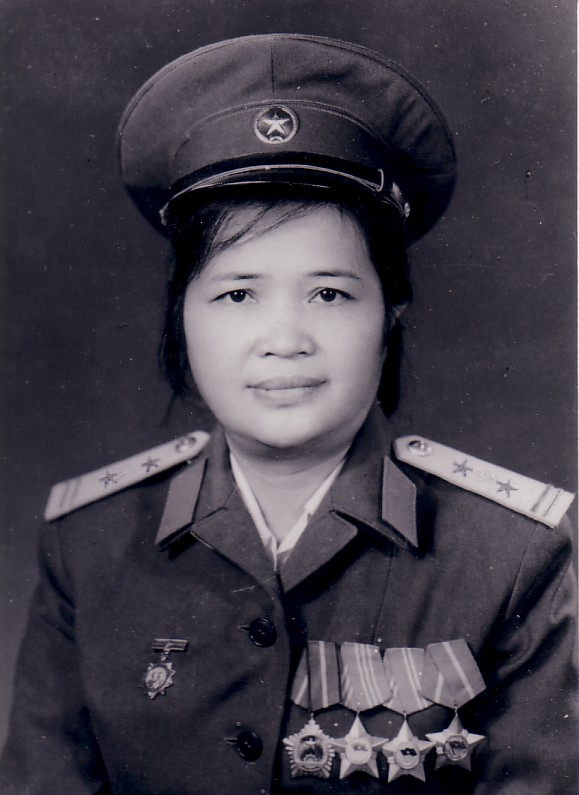
- Nicknames: Thanh Xuân; Minh Phượng
- Born: 26 August 1926; Hòa An District, Cao Bằng Province, French Indochina
- Died: 28 January 2010 (aged 83) Hanoi, Vietnam
- Buried: Thanh Tước Cemetery
- Allegiance: Viet Minh; Vietnam
- Branch: Vietnam People's Army; Viet Cong
- Service years: 1944–1975
- Rank: Lieutenant colonel
- Conflicts: First Indochina War; Vietnam War
- Awards: Order of Independence; Resistance Order; Glorious Fighter Medal (3)
- Spouse: Hoàng Văn Thái (m. 1945; died 1986)

Đàm Thị Loan (Vietnamese pronunciation: [ʔɗaːm˨˩ tʰi˧˨ʔ lwaːn˧˧]]; 1926–2010), born Đàm Thị Nết ([ʔɗaːm˨˩ tʰi˧˨ʔ net̚˧˦]), was a lieutenant colonel in the People's Army of Vietnam. She was one of three female soldiers in the original Vietnam Armed Propaganda Unit for National Liberation in 1944 and was in the honor guard hoisting the flag of the new independent country in the Independence ceremony held at Ba Dinh Square on September 2, 1945. Her husband was general Hoàng Văn Thái, the first chief of staff of the Vietnam People's Army and the military leader of Viet Cong.
