= Keo Temple =

Buddhist Temple, Vietnam

Coordinates: 20°21′38″N 106°17′50″E

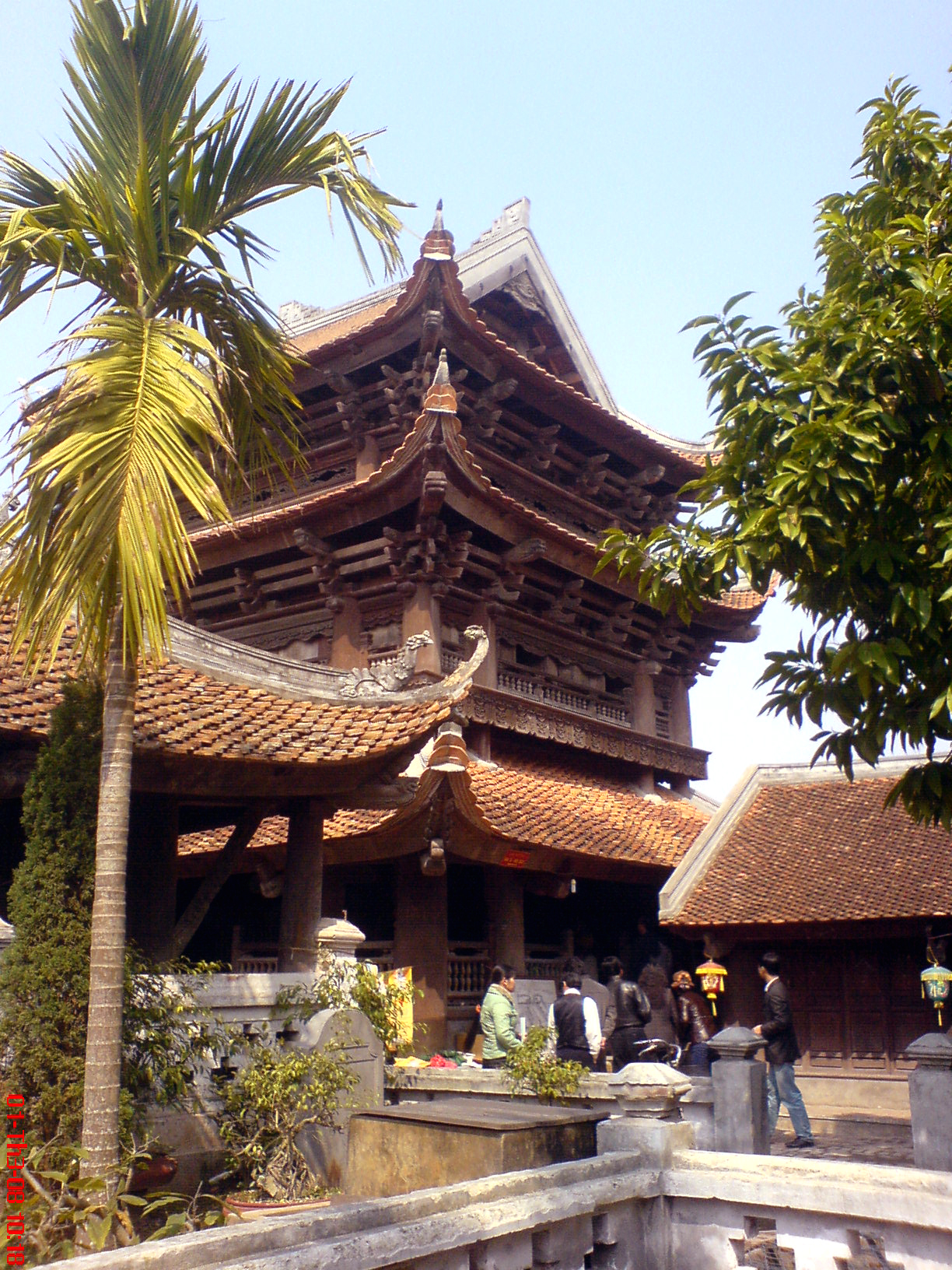
Keo Temple

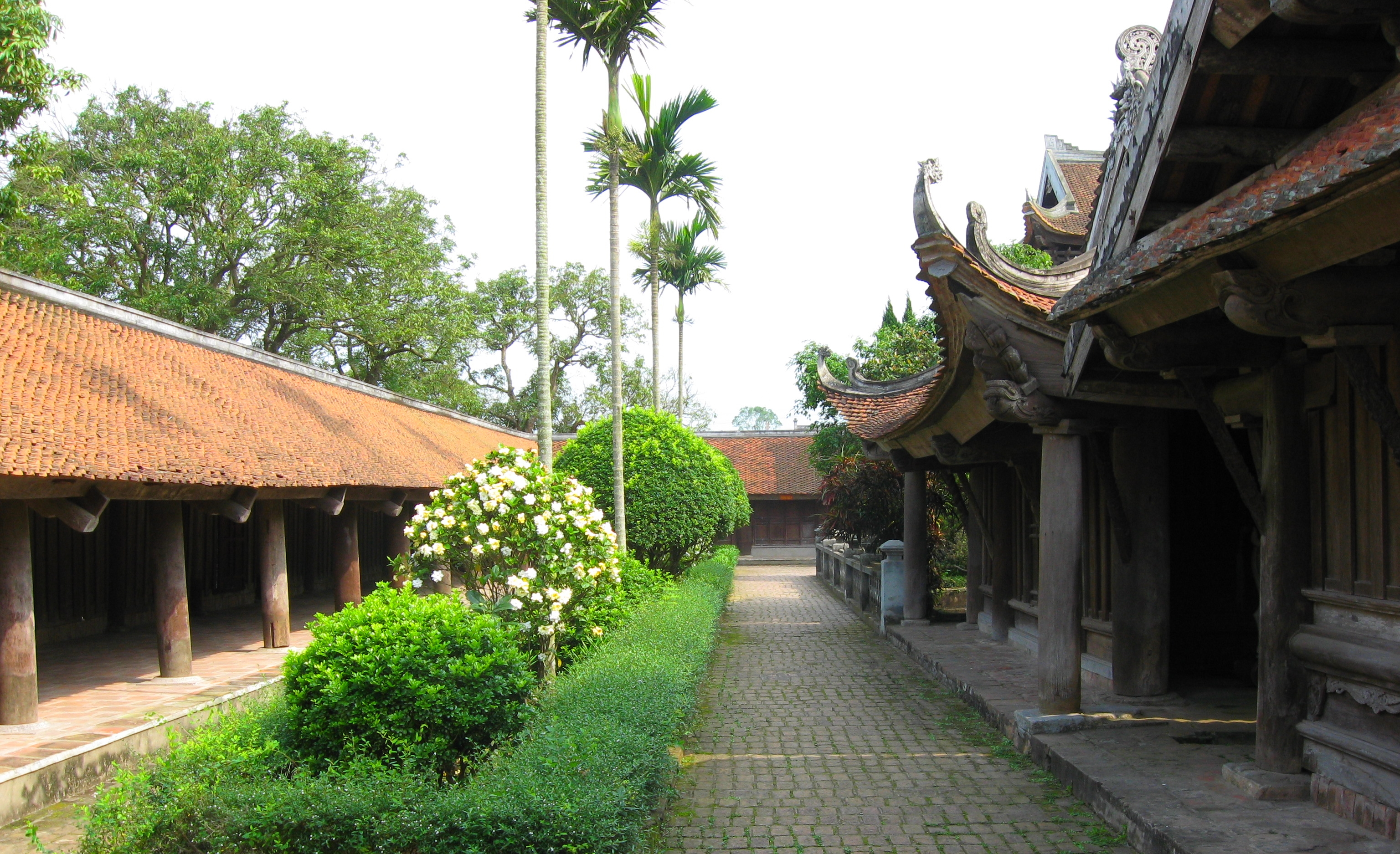
A corner of Keo Temple

Keo Temple (Vietnamese: Chùa Keo, Official name: Thần Quang Tự (神光寺)) is a Buddhist temple in Vũ Thư District, Thái Bình Province, Vietnam. The temple was commenced in 1061 under the Lý dynasty near the Red River.

The temple was dedicated in the 1130s to the monk Nguyễn Minh Không (vi:Lý Quốc Sư) by emperor Lý Thần Tông after the monk cured his leprosy.
