= Hưng Hà district =

Coordinates: 20.583°N 106.167°E

Hưng Hà district Huyện Hưng Hà
- District
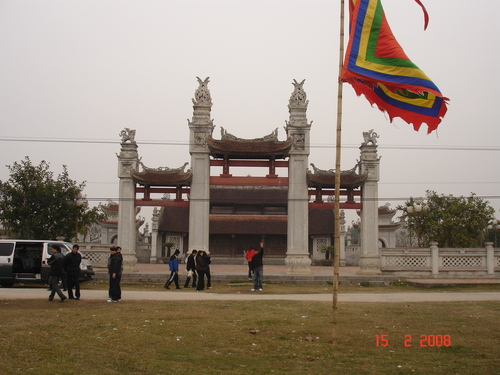
- The gate of the Trần Temple in Thái Bình
- Interactive map of Hưng Hà district
- Country: Vietnam
- Region: Red River Delta
- Province: Thái Bình
- Capital: Hưng Hà

Area
  - Total: 77 sq mi (200 km^{2})

Population (2003)
  - Total: 252,912
- Time zone: UTC+07:00 (Indochina Time)

Hưng Hà is a former rural district (huyện) of Thái Bình province in the Red River Delta region of Vietnam. As of 2003 the district had a population of 252,912. The district covers an area of 200 km^{2}. The district capital lies at Hưng Hà.
