= Tiền Hải =

Tiền Hải Xã Tiền Hải
- Commune
- Tiền Hải commune
- Location within Vietnam
- Coordinates: 20°24′23″N 106°30′13″E
- Country: Vietnam
- Region: Red River Delta
- Province: Hưng Yên
- Time zone: UTC+7 (UTC + 7)

Tiền Hải is a commune (xã) of Hưng Yên Province, Vietnam.
