= Tiền Hải district =

Coordinates: 20.417°N 106.550°E

Tiền Hải district Huyện Tiền Hải
- District
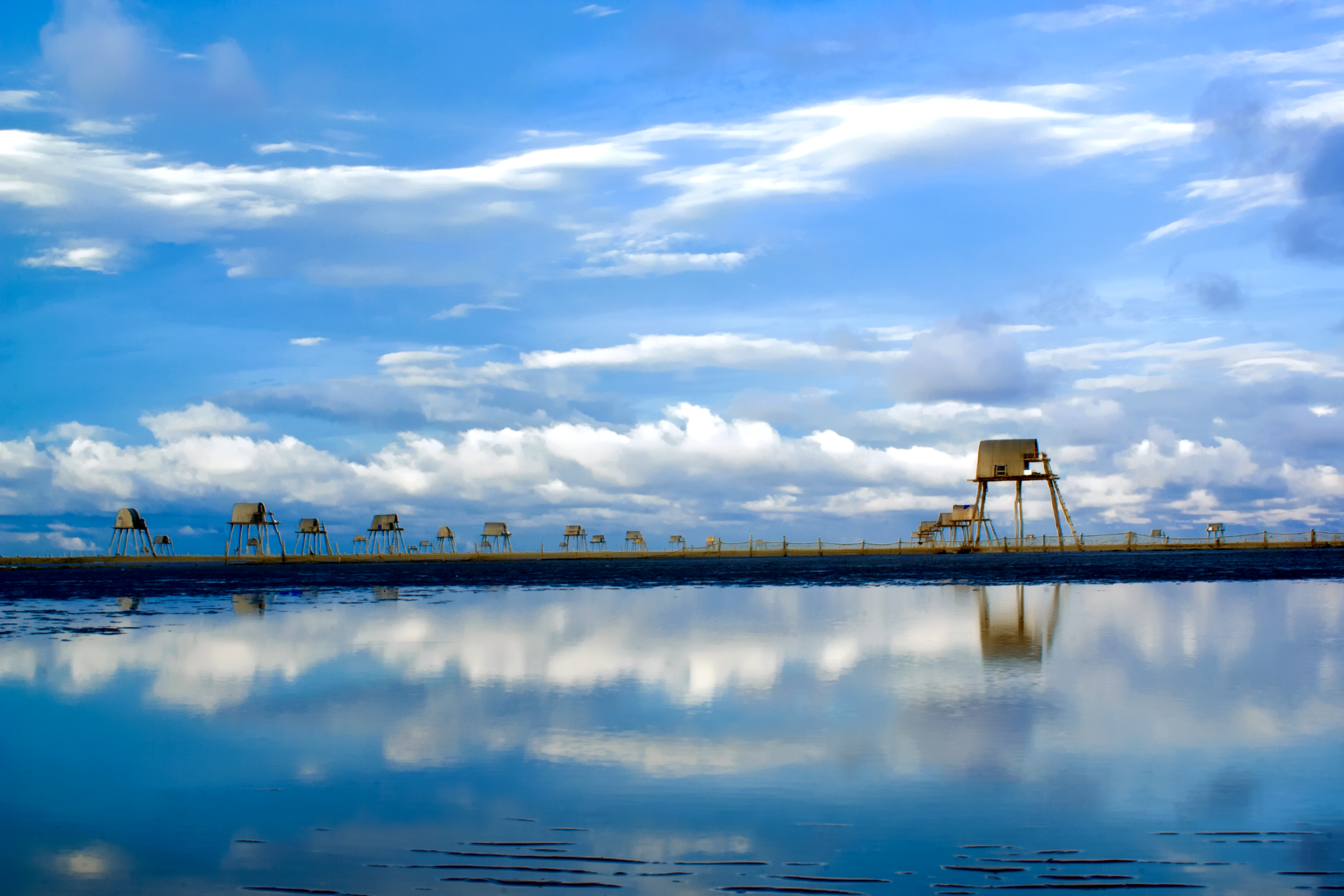
- View of Dong Chau
- Interactive map of Tiền Hải district
- Country: Vietnam
- Region: Red River Delta
- Province: Thái Bình
- Capital: Tiền Hải

Area
  - Total: 87 sq mi (226 km^{2})

Population (2003)
  - Total: 213,616
- Time zone: UTC+07:00 (Indochina Time)

Tiền Hải is a rural district of Thái Bình province in the Red River Delta region of Vietnam. As of 2003 the district had a population of 213,616. The district covers an area of 226 km^{2}. The district capital lies at Tiền Hải.

== Notable people ==
Hoang Van Thai (1915-1986), first Chief of General Staff of Vietnam People's Army.
