= Đông Hưng district =

Đông Hưng District Huyện Đông Hưng
- Former district
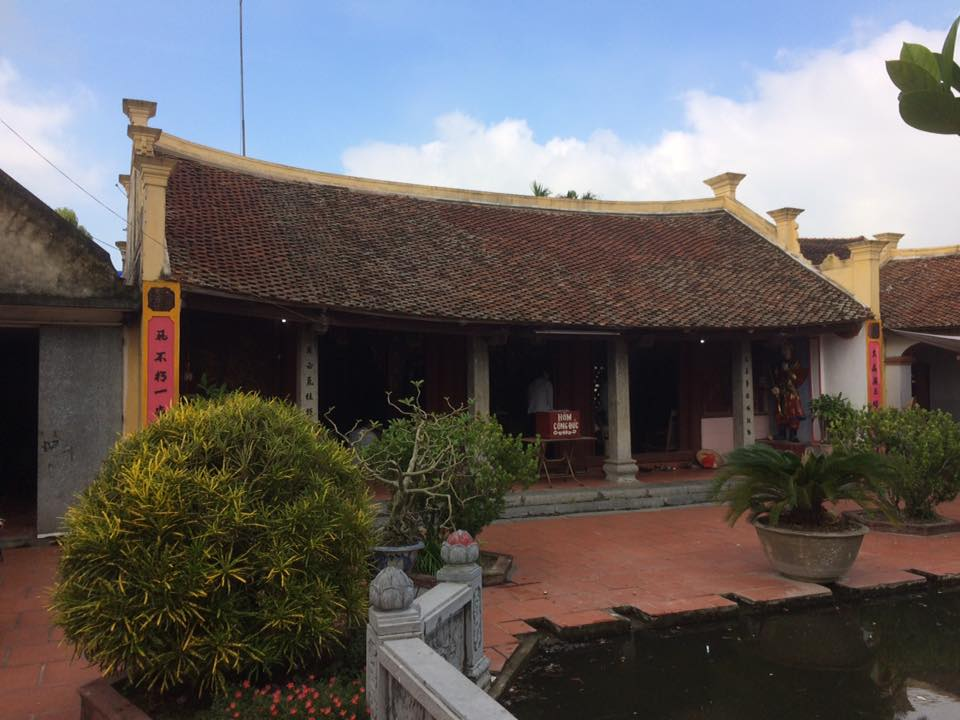
- Thánh Mẫu Temple in Đông Sơn Commune, formerly in Đông Hưng District

- Location in Vietnam
- Country: Vietnam
- Region: Red River Delta
- Former province: Thái Bình Province
- Established: June 17, 1969
- Capital: Đông Hưng

Area
  - Total: 191.76 km^{2} (74.04 sq mi)

Population (2019)
  - Total: 244,838
  - Density: 1,276.8/km^{2} (3,306.9/sq mi)
- Time zone: UTC+07:00 (Indochina Time)
- Dissolved: July 1, 2025
- Ethnic groups: Predominantly Kinh

Đông Hưng District is a former rural district (huyện) in Thái Bình Province, in the Red River Delta region of Vietnam. Established in 1969, it served as an important industrial and agricultural hub within the province. The district was recognized as a new rural district in 2019. As of July 1, 2025, Đông Hưng District was dissolved as part of administrative reforms implementing a two-tier local government system, with its territories integrated into the newly formed Hưng Yên Province following the merger of the former Thái Bình and Hưng Yên provinces.

== Geography ==
Đông Hưng District spanned 191.76 km² in central Thái Bình Province, characterized by a network of rivers including the Trà Lý River, which formed its southern boundary with Vũ Thư and Kiến Xương districts. Other key waterways included the Luộc River, Tiên Hưng River (a major branch of the Diêm Hộ River), and smaller rivers like Sa Lung and Hoài, essential for irrigation and transportation. The terrain supported intensive agriculture, with rice paddies dominating the landscape.

== History ==
The modern district formed on June 17, 1969, by merging Tiên Hưng and Đông Quan districts, with adjustments transferring some communes to Hưng Hà District.

Subsequent administrative changes included:

- March 20, 1986: Transfer of Đông Hòa and Hoàng Diệu communes to Thái Bình town.
- December 2, 1986: Establishment of Đông Hưng town as the district seat from parts of Đông Hợp, Đông La, and Nguyên Xá communes.
- December 13, 2007: Transfer of Đông Thọ and Đông Mỹ communes to Thái Bình City.
- March 1, 2020: Mergers creating new communes like Đông Quan, Liên Hoa, Hồng Bạch, Minh Phú, and Hà Giang.
- November 1, 2024: Further mergers forming Liên An Đô, Phong Dương Tiến, and Xuân Quang Động communes.

The district was dissolved on July 1, 2025, amid broader reforms, with its 32 administrative units (one town and 31 communes) redistributed. This coincided with the merger of Thái Bình Province into the new Hưng Yên Province.

== Administrative divisions ==
Prior to dissolution, Đông Hưng comprised Đông Hưng town and 31 communes: Đông Á, Đông Các, Đông Cường, Đông Dương, Đông Hoàng, Đông Hợp, Đông Kinh, Đông La, Đông Phương, Đông Quan, Đông Sơn, Đông Tân, Đông Vinh, Đông Xá, Hà Giang, Hồng Bạch, Hồng Giang, Hồng Việt, Liên An Đô, Liên Hoa, Lô Giang, Mê Linh, Minh Phú, Minh Tân, Nguyên Xá, Phong Dương Tiến, Phú Châu, Phú Lương, Thăng Long, Trọng Quan, and Xuân Quang Động.

== Economy ==
Đông Hưng was a leading contributor to Thái Bình's industrial, handicraft, and auxiliary sectors. It hosted industrial clusters, attracting domestic and foreign investments that transformed the local economy. Agriculture remained central, with rice cultivation supplemented by crop diversification and livestock.

Notable industries included:

- Bánh cáy production: Around 300 households produced 120-150 tons monthly, a traditional confection.
- Eyeglasses trade: Lịch Động village in Đông Các Commune was renowned for eyewear manufacturing and sales.
- Mít dai vàng: Hà Giang Commune produced famed golden jackfruit.
- Other crafts: Bamboo weaving, mat weaving, garment making, and food processing.

Infrastructure like the BOT Đông Hưng toll station on the bypass route supported economic growth.

== Culture and landmarks ==
Đông Hưng was a cradle of traditional arts, including Chèo theater and water puppetry, with roots in the Trần Dynasty. Puppet troupes from Nguyên Xá and Đông Các performed internationally. Folk dances like flag dancing and lion dancing were prevalent.

Key landmarks:

- Cổ Dũng Temple and Pavilion: In Đông La Commune, dating to the Hùng Vương era, honoring generals; annual festival on the 10th day of the 3rd lunar month.
- Mother Goddess Temple (Đền Thánh Mẫu): In Đông Sơn Commune, dedicated to Đinh Thị Tỉnh, a Đinh Dynasty queen; also Phù Lưu Pavilion.
- Thiên Quý Pagoda: In Đông Xuân Commune, built late Lý-early Trần period; national relic since 1989.
- Mid-Autumn Festival giant lanterns in Nam Đông Hưng (formerly part of the district).

== Transportation ==
The district lies at the intersection of National Highway 10 (to Hải Phòng and Quảng Ninh) and National Highway 39 (to Hưng Yên and Hanoi). River routes and bus lines connected it regionally.
