= Thái Bình province =

Province of Vietnam

- Province
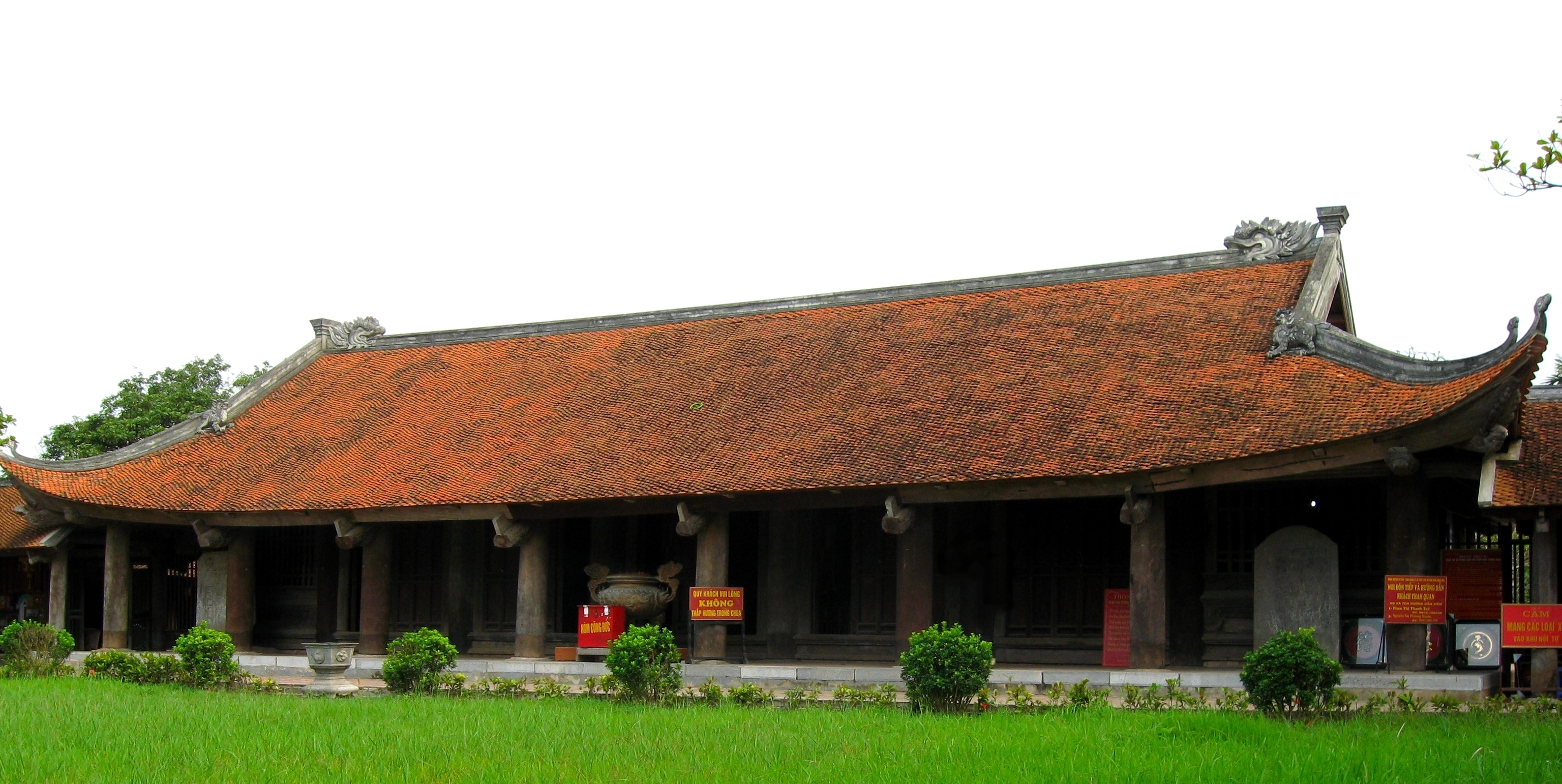
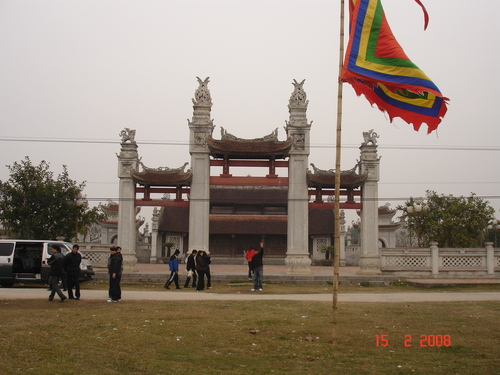
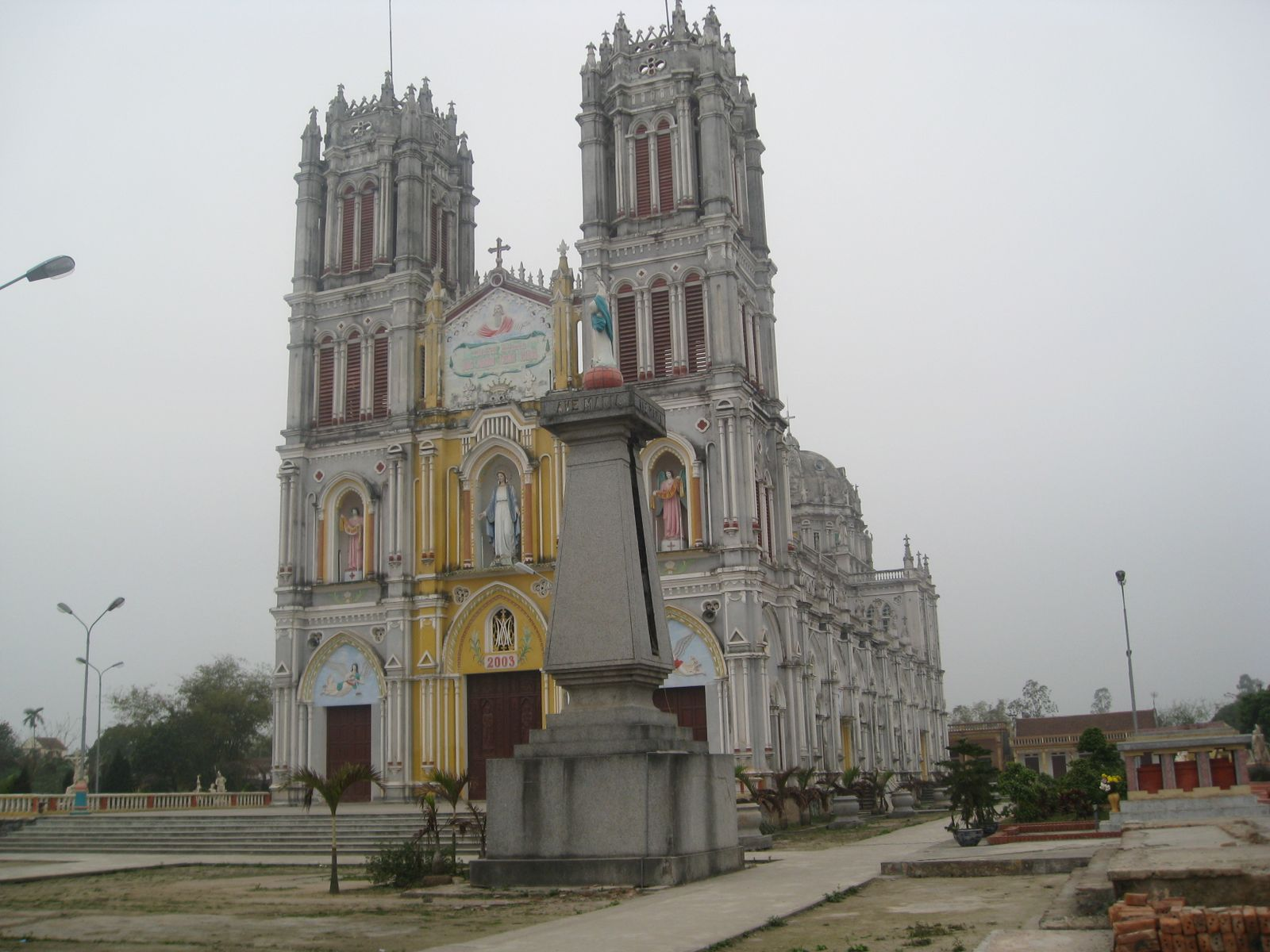
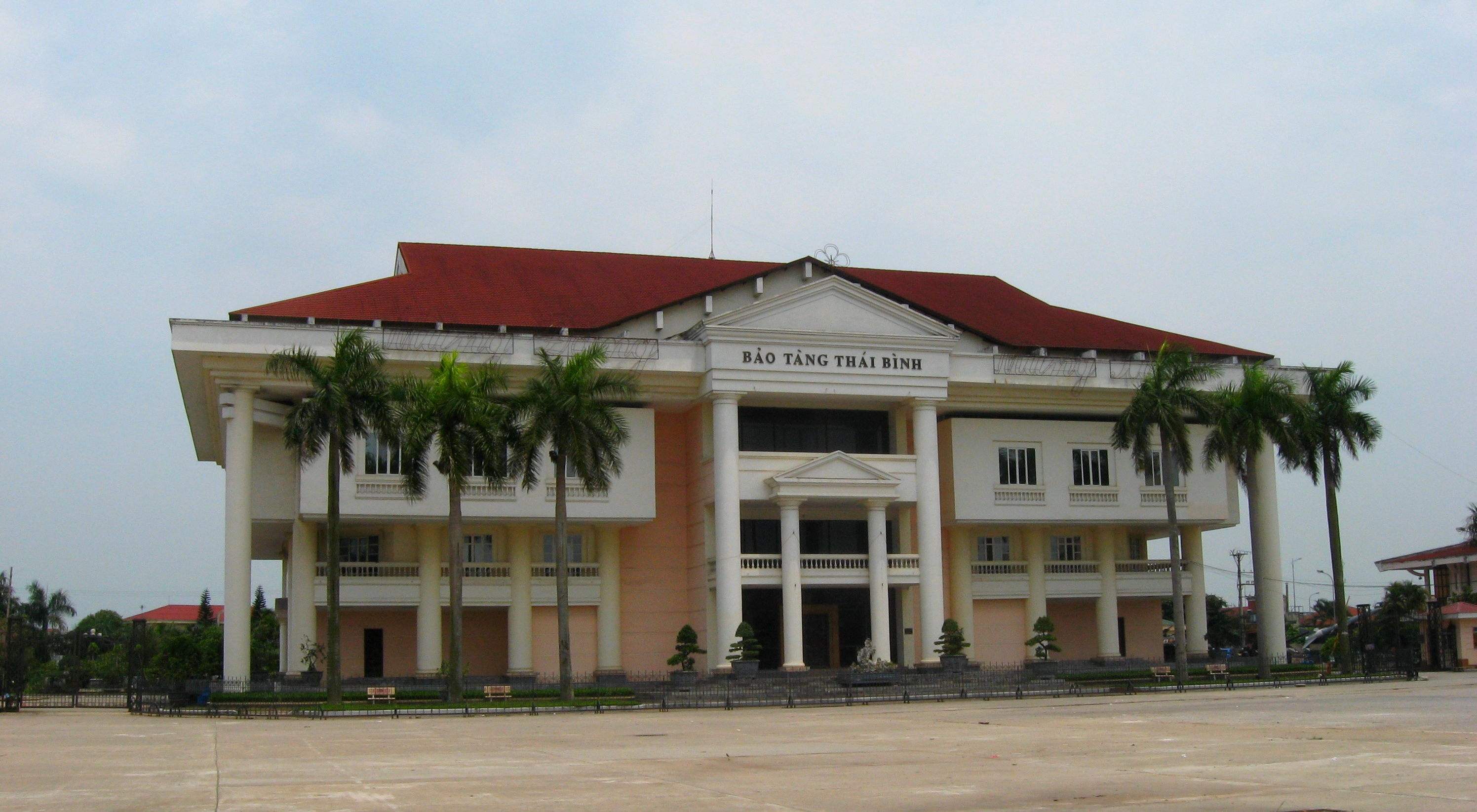
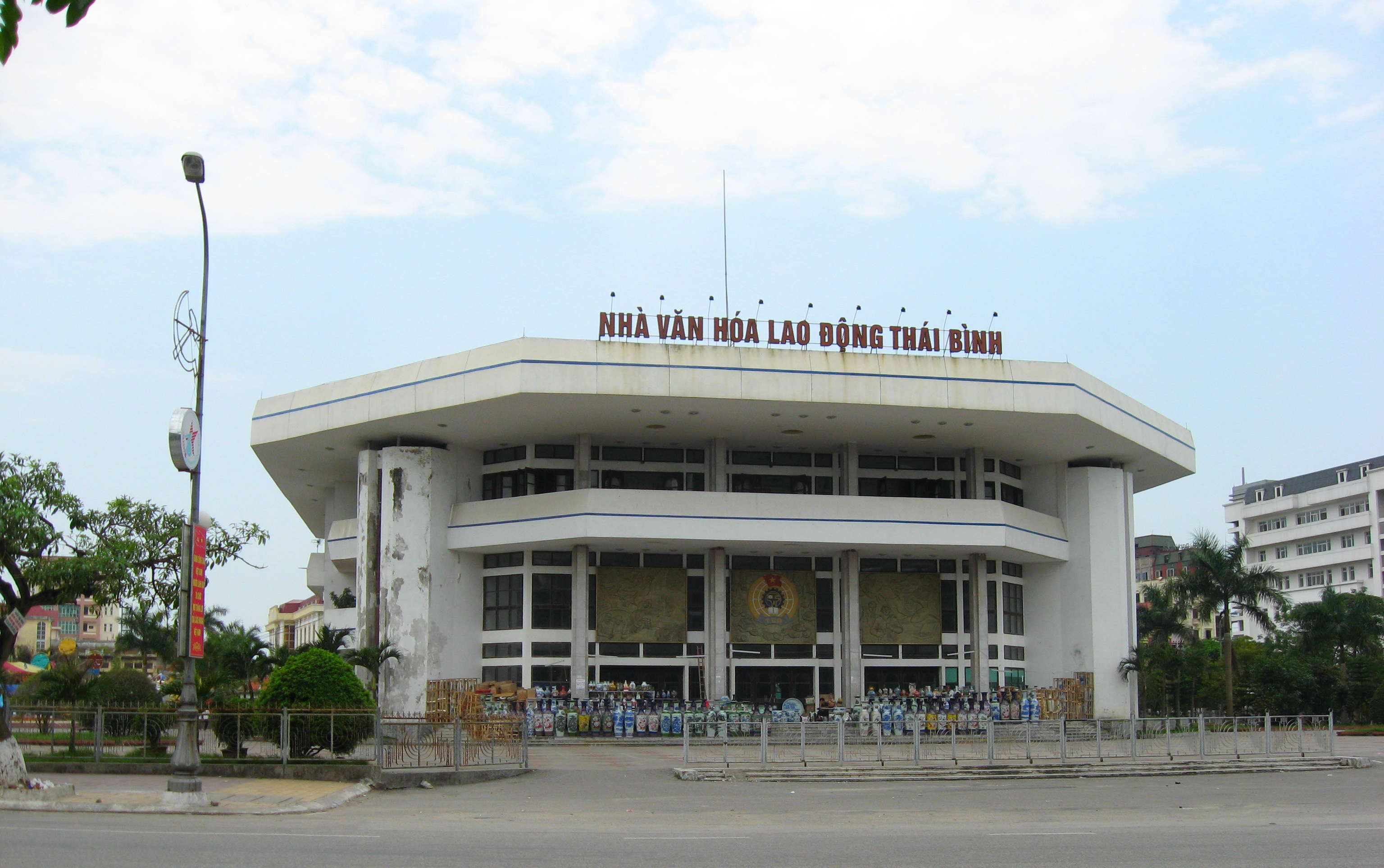
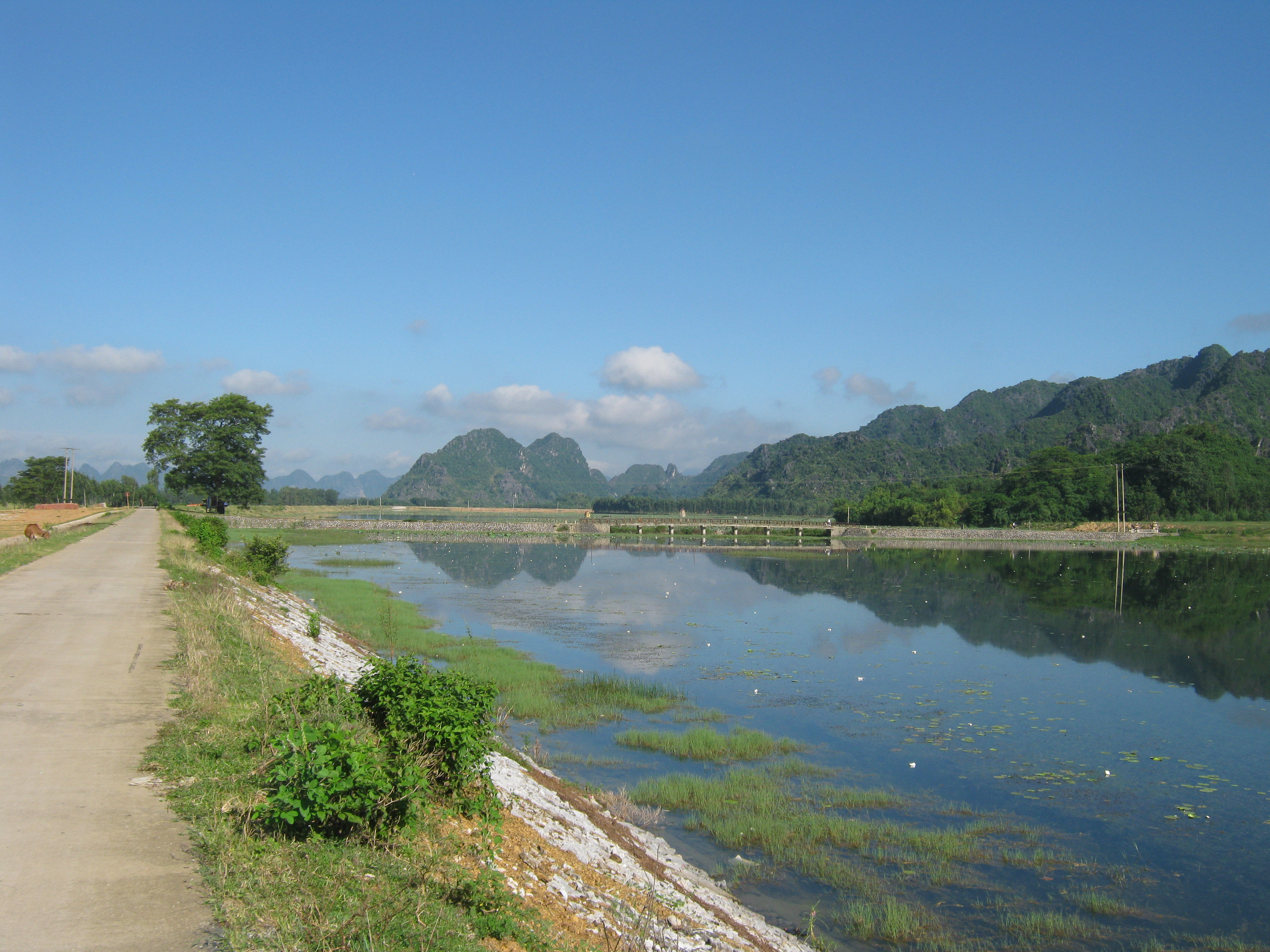
- Thần Quang Pagoda • Trần Triều Temple • An Lập Canthedral • Museum Thái Bình • Culture Thái Bình • Model Month Tide Đinh
- Nickname: "Riceland" (Quê Lúa)
- Location of Thái Bình within Vietnam
- Coordinates: 20°30′N 106°20′E
- Country: Vietnam
- Region: Red River Delta
- Founded: 21-March-1890
- Merge to Hưng Yên: 1-July-2025
- Central agency: Thái Bình

Government
  - People's Council Chair: Nguyễn Tiến Thành
  - People's Committee Chair: Nguyễn Mạnh Hùng

Area
  - Total: 1,584.61 km^{2} (611.82 sq mi)

Population (2025)
  - Total: 2,093,049
  - Density: 1,320.86/km^{2} (3,421.01/sq mi)

Demographics
  - Ethnicities: Kinh, Tanka, [...]

GDP
  - Total: VND 71.300 trillion US$ 2.930 billion
- Time zone: UTC+7 (ICT)
- Area codes: 227
- ISO 3166 code: VN-20
- HDI (2020): ▲0.737 (18th)
- Website: www.thaibinh.gov.vn

Thái Bình was a former coastal eastern province in the Red River Delta region of northern Vietnam. Its name is chữ Hán (太平) for "great peace." It is about 18 km from Nam Định, 70 km from Haiphong, and 110 km from Hanoi. As of April 2024, it had a population 1,888,184.

On June 12, 2025 the decision was made to subsume Thái Bình into Hưng Yên province.

== Geography ==
=== Topography ===
The terrain of Thái Bình Province is relatively flat with a gradient of less than 1%; the common elevation ranges from 1–2 meters above sea level, gradually decreasing from the north to the southeast. Thái Bình has a coastline stretching 52 km.

Four major rivers flow through the province: the Hóa River (35 km long) in the north and northeast; the Luộc River (a distributary of the Red River), 53 km long, in the north and northwest; the lower course of the Red River (67 km long) in the west and south; and the Trà Lý River (a primary distributary of the Red River), 65 km long, which flows across the middle of the province from west to east. These rivers form four major estuaries: Diêm Điền (Thái Bình), Ba Lạt, Trà Lý, and Lân. Due to its coastal proximity, all these rivers are affected by tidal regimes. In summer, the water level rises quickly with a large flow and high alluvium content, while in winter, the flow rate significantly decreases and the alluvium amount is negligible, allowing saltwater intrusion deep into the mainland (15–20 km).

=== Climate and Hydrology ===
Thái Bình lies within the humid subtropical climate zone, experiencing four seasons (Spring, Summer, Autumn, Winter). Summer is hot and humid, with heavy rainfall from May to September. Winter is dry and cold, lasting from November of the preceding year to March of the following year. The autumn season, from July to October, is characterized by cool, mild weather. Spring begins from mid-January to mid-March, though less distinct than in countries further north of the Tropic of Cancer. Average Temperature: 23,5 °C. Annual Sunshine Hours: 1,600−1,800 hours. Average Relative Humidity: 85−90%

== Administrative divisions ==
Before the merger, Thái Bình is subdivided into eight district-level administrative units.

- 7 rural districts:
  - Đông Hưng
  - Hưng Hà
  - Kiến Xương
  - Quỳnh Phụ
  - Thái Thụy
  - Tiền Hải
  - Vũ Thư
- 1 province-level municipality:
  - Thái Bình capital-city

They are further subdivided into nine commune-level townships, 223 communes, and 10 wards.

== Culture ==
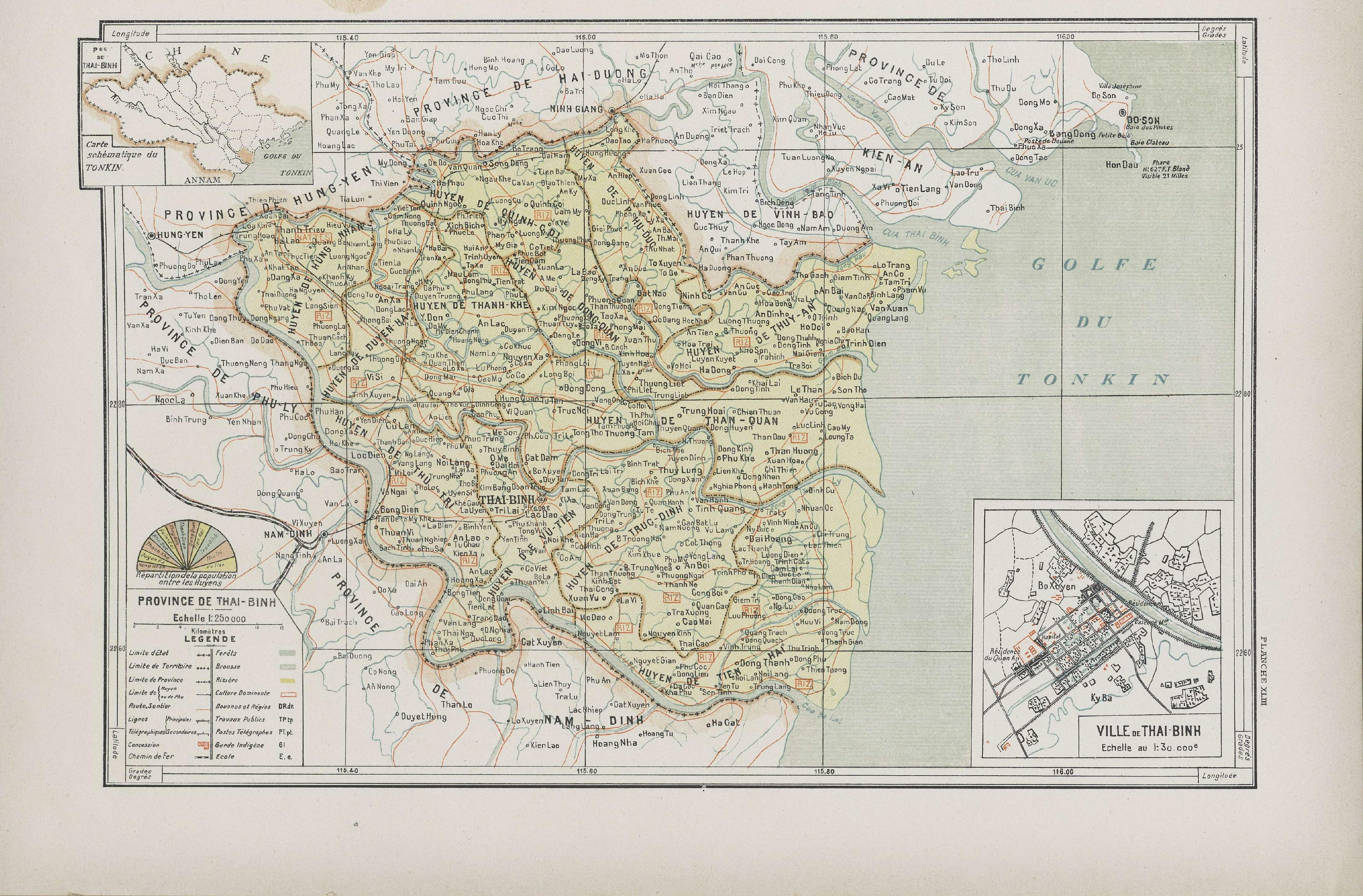
Map of Thai Binh province in 1909

Although situated in the centre of the Red River Delta, in the past, Thái Bình was considered an island bounded by three larger rivers, and is the only province never to have been merged or separated. This position gives the people of Thái Bình a quite distinct culture. Thái Bình is the homeland of hát chèo opera (in Khuốc village, Phong Châu commune, Đông Hưng District) and water puppetry (in Nguyên Xá commune, Đông Hưng District).

Thái Bình is the homeland of famous historical figures, including: Lê Quý Đôn, Trần Thủ Độ, Bùi Viện... and others.

=== Etymology ===
The province's name derives from Sino-Vietnamese 太平 meaning "great peace".

== Economy ==
The province includes the Tien Hai Nature Reserve, which is part of the Red River Delta Biosphere Reserve. Much of this is being considered for development.

== See also ==
- Đồng Xâm, a silvercraft village in the northern province of Thái Bình's Kien Xuong District
