= Trương Quí Minh Nhàn =

Vietnamese beauty pageant winner (born 2001)

- Born: Trương Quí Minh Nhàn; 15 July 2001 (age 25); Huế, Vietnam
- Education: Da Nang University of Economics
- Beauty pageant titleholder
- Title: 2nd Runner-up Miss Grand Vietnam 2023
- Major competitions: Miss Vietnam Era 2022 (Top 25); Miss Grand Vietnam 2023 (2nd Runner-up); Miss Cosmo Vietnam 2025 (Top 5)

Trương Quí Minh Nhàn is a Vietnamese model, MC and beauty pageant titleholder. She won the title of 2nd Runner-up at Miss Grand Vietnam 2023 and participated in Miss Cosmo Vietnam 2025, finishing in Top 5.

== Life ==
Nhàn was born in 2001 in Huế. She is a former student of Quoc Hoc Hue High School for the Gifted, has IELTS 8.0. She shared that before participating in Miss Grand Vietnam 2023, she weighed nearly 70 kg. During the competition in the beauty arena, she had to eat and practice rigorously.

Previously, she won the title of 1st Runner-up at Miss Danang University of Economics 2022 and Top 25 Miss Vietnam Era 2022.

== Career ==
=== Miss Grand Vietnam 2023 ===
She registered for Miss Grand Vietnam 2023 and won the title of 2nd Runner-up.

=== Miss Cosmo Vietnam 2025 ===
In 2025, she returned to participate in Miss Cosmo Vietnam 2025 to find the opportunity to represent Vietnam at Miss Cosmo 2025, and finished in the Top 5.

Awards and achievements
Preceded by Trần Tuyết Như	2nd Runner-up Miss Grand Vietnam; 2023	Succeeded by Vũ Thị Thu Hiền
