= Miss Cosmo Vietnam 2025 =

- Date: 21 June 2025
- Venue: Paradise Resort, Nha Trang, Khánh Hòa, Vietnam
- Broadcaster: YouTube; Facebook Live; VTV9
- Entrants: 45
- Placements: 20
- Winner: Nguyễn Hoàng Phương Linh; Hồ Chí Minh

Miss Cosmo Vietnam 2025 was the 7th edition of the Miss Cosmo Vietnam pageant, held on June 21, 2025. Miss Cosmo Vietnam 2023 Bùi Thị Xuân Hạnh crowned her successor Nguyễn Hoàng Phương Linh at the end of the event, Where she represented Vietnam at the Miss Cosmo 2025 Competition, finishing with a Top 10 Placement.

== Change ==
- This year's competition will change the name of the semi-final night to Jury Session and the contestants will participate in a reality TV show in Bạc Liêu, Hồ Chí Minh City and more.
- Another highlight is the Carnival Costume show taking place in Nha Trang and combining it with a street parade, promising to bring a vibrant festival atmosphere. The competition is inspired by the Best Of The World Festival at Miss Cosmo 2024, honoring the spirit of creativity and cultural diversity.
- The age of candidates is raised to 33 instead of 30 like last year.

== Results ==
=== Placements ===
Color keys

- Declared as the winner in an international pageant.
- Ended as runner-up in an international pageant.
- Ended as finalist or semi-finalist in an international pageant.
- Unplaced.

Placement	Contestant	International pagent	International placement
Miss Cosmo Vietnam 2025	Hồ Chí Minh – Nguyễn Hoàng Phương Linh	Miss Cosmo 2025	Top 10
Runner-Up	Phú Thọ – Đỗ Cẩm Ly	Miss Cosmo 2026	TBD
Top 5	Gia Lai – Hoàng Kim Ngân; Huế – Trương Quí Minh Nhàn; Vĩnh Long – Nguyễn Thị Thuỳ Vi		
Top 10	Đà Nẵng – Ngô Thị Mỹ Hải; Hải Phòng – Mai Anh; Hồ Chí Minh – Phạm Huỳnh Thủy Tiên; Ninh Bình – Lê Thu Hòa §; Vĩnh Long – Hồ Nguyễn Huế Anh		
Top 20	Bắc Ninh – Nguyễn Lan Anh; Cần Thơ – Mai Dạ Thảo; Đà Nẵng – Nguyễn Bùi Uyên Thảo; Đắk Lắk – Đinh Thị Triều Tiên; Hưng Yên – Bùi Thị Linh; Khánh Hòa – Phạm Thị Diễm Nhi; Hà Nội – Đào Minh Tâm; Hồ Chí Minh – Nguyễn Đặng Thanh Tuyền; Nghệ An – Nguyễn Thị Quỳnh Trang; Quảng Ngãi – Huỳnh Ngọc Kim Ngân		

§ – Voted into Top 10 by viewers.

=== Special awards ===
Award	Contestant
Best in National Costume (Miss Aodai)	Cà Mau – Đoàn Ngọc Trân
Cosmo Best Smile Award	Phú Thọ – Đỗ Cẩm Ly
Cosmo Best Face Award	Gia Lai – Hoàng Kim Ngân
Cosmo Best Body Award	Vĩnh Long – Nguyễn Thị Thùy Vi
Miss Popular Vote	Ninh Bình – Lê Thu Hòa
Miss Congeniality	Hải Phòng – Phạm Thị Minh Huệ
Miss Talent	Hồ Chí Minh City – Phạm Huỳnh Thủy Tiên
Miss Beach	Vĩnh Long – Nguyễn Thị Thùy Vi
Miss Courage	Bắc Ninh – Nguyễn Thu Hà
Miss Photogenic	Gia Lai – Hoàng Kim Ngân
Miss Sport	Hải Phòng – Mai Anh
Best Social Media	Huế – Trương Quí Minh Nhàn
Cosmo Social Ambassador Award	Hà Nội – Đào Minh Tâm

==== Miss Beach ====
Final Results	Contestants
Winner	Vĩnh Long – Nguyễn Thị Thùy Vi
Top 5	Hải Phòng – Mai Anh; Bắc Ninh – Nguyễn Lan Anh; Đà Nẵng – Ngô Thị Mỹ Hải; Gia Lai – Hoàng Kim Ngân
Top 12	Hải Phòng – Nguyễn Thị Quỳnh Anh; Quảng Ngãi – Phạm Phan Y Hạ; Hải Phòng – Phạm Thị Minh Huệ; Phú Thọ – Đỗ Cẩm Ly; Huế – Trương Quí Minh Nhàn; Hồ Chí Minh City – Phạm Huỳnh Thủy Tiên; Cà Mau – Đoàn Ngọc Trân

==== Miss Talent ====
Final Results	Contestants
Winner	Hồ Chí Minh City – Phạm Huỳnh Thủy Tiên
Top 5	Hải Phòng – Mai Anh; Hồ Chí Minh City – Nguyễn Hoàng Phương Linh; Phú Thọ – Đỗ Cẩm Ly; Huế – Trương Quí Minh Nhàn
Top 10	Vĩnh Long – Hồ Nguyễn Huế Anh; Đà Nẵng – Ngô Thị Mỹ Hải; Hải Phòng – Phạm Thị Minh Huệ; Khánh Hòa – Phạm Thị Diễm Nhi; Hà Nội – Đào Minh Tâm

==== Miss Fashion ====
Final Results	Contestants
Chiến thắng	Hồ Chí Minh City – Nguyễn Đặng Thanh Tuyền
Top 6	Gia Lai – Hoàng Kim Ngân; Huế – Trương Quí Minh Nhàn; Cần Thơ – Mai Dạ Thảo; Đắk Lắk – Đinh Thị Triều Tiên; Hà Nội – Bùi Thị Thu Trang
Top 12	Hải Phòng – Mai Anh; Đà Nẵng – Ngô Thị Mỹ Hải; Hồ Chí Minh City – Nguyễn Hoàng Phương Linh; Phú Thọ – Đỗ Cẩm Ly; Hồ Chí Minh City – Phạm Huỳnh Thủy Tiên; Vĩnh Long – Nguyễn Thị Thùy Vi

==== Miss Courage ====
Final Results	Contestants
Winner	Bắc Ninh – Nguyễn Thu Hà
Top 5	Hồ Chí Minh City – Nguyễn Hoàng Phương Linh; Phú Thọ – Đỗ Cẩm Ly; Khánh Hòa – Phạm Thị Diễm Nhi; Đắk Lắk – Mlô H Senaivi
Top 20	Vĩnh Long – Hồ Nguyễn Huế Anh; Bắc Ninh – Nguyễn Lan Anh; Hải Phòng – Nguyễn Thị Quỳnh Anh; Đồng Nai – Lê Kim Quế Đan; Lào Cai – Nguyễn Hương Giang; Ninh Bình – Lê Thu Hòa; Hồ Chí Minh City – Nguyễn Yến Linh; Gia Lai – Hoàng Kim Ngân; Quảng Ngãi – Huỳnh Ngọc Kim Ngân; Huế – Trương Quí Minh Nhàn; Bắc Ninh – Nguyễn Lê Hà Phương; Đà Nẵng – Nguyễn Bùi Uyên Thảo; Đắk Lắk – Đinh Thị Triều Tiên; Nghệ An – Nguyễn Thị Quỳnh Trang; Vĩnh Long – Nguyễn Thị Thùy Vi

==== Miss Popular Vote ====
- Ninh Bình – Lê Thu Hòa won Miss Popular Vote and automatically placed into Top 10.

Final Results	Contestants	Score
Winner	Ninh Bình – Lê Thu Hòa	3,980,627
Top 5	Bắc Ninh – Nguyễn Lan Anh	3,802,525
Top 5	Gia Lai – Hoàng Kim Ngân	2,800,207
Top 5	Khánh Hòa – Phạm Thị Diễm Nhi	1,286,449
Top 5	Bắc Ninh – Nguyễn Lê Hà Phương	526,094

==== Cosmo Social Ambassador Award ====
- Hà Nội – Đào Minh Tâm won Cosmo Social Ambassador Award and automatically placed into Top 20.

Final Results	Contestants
Winner	Hà Nội – Đào Minh Tâm
Top 5	Quảng Ngãi – Bùi Thị Thục Hiền; Hưng Yên – Bùi Thị Linh; Hồ Chí Minh City – Nguyễn Yến Linh; Nghệ An – Nguyễn Thị Quỳnh Trang

==== Best Carnival Costume ====
Final Results	Performances	Costumes	Designers
Winner	Hà Nội – Bùi Thị Thu Trang	Hoàng Vũ Yến	Nguyễn Duy Hậu
2nd place	Hồ Chí Minh City – Nguyễn Yến Linh	Cosmic Bloom	Andy Vo
3rd place	Hà Nội – Trần Hoàng Anh Phương	Thiên Mã Chi Vũ	Nguyễn Nhựt Duy
Top 15	Gia Lai – Hoàng Kim Ngân	Nắng Trên Nan	Nguyễn Tuấn Kiệt
Top 15	Quảng Ngãi – Bùi Thị Thục Hiền	Quang Diễm Hội	Huỳnh Thành Phát
Top 15	Phú Thọ – Đỗ Cẩm Ly	In The Dark	Nguyễn Quốc Đạt
Top 15	Huế – Trương Quí Minh Nhàn	Ngọt Vải	Nguyễn Lan Anh
Top 15	Đắk Lắk – Đinh Thị Triều Tiên	Chắk Tứk Chôl Chnăm	Danh Tính
Top 15	Nghệ An – Lê Khánh Chi	Wings of Eternal Flame	Đoàn Phúc Thiện
Top 15	Cần Thơ – Vương Tú Vy	Sếu Phương Nam	Huy Nguyễn
Top 15	Cần Thơ – Mai Dạ Thảo	Vũ Sứa Quang	Nguyễn Duy Hậu và Nguyễn Hoàng Long
Top 15	Thanh Hóa – Nguyễn Thị Trâm Anh	Khảm Vũ	Nguyễn Việt Hưng
Top 15	Bắc Ninh – Nguyễn Lê Hà Phương	Mỹ Nghệ Ốc	Lê Quang Thắng
Top 15	Đà Nẵng – Ngô Thị Mỹ Hải	Chiếu Mơ Định Yên	Bùi Công Thiên Bảo
Top 15	Khánh Hòa – Phạm Thị Diễm Nhi	Quyền Kê	Huỳnh Tấn Phát
Best Impressive Performance Style	Hồ Chí Minh City – Nguyễn Yến Linh	Cosmic Bloom	Andy Vo
Best Effective Advertising Design.	Vĩnh Long – Nguyễn Thị Thùy Vi	Vũ điệu Mayura	Thạch Thị Đa Ri

==== Cosmo Best Face Award ====
Final Results	Contestants
Winner	Gia Lai – Hoàng Kim Ngân
Top 10	Ninh Bình – Lê Thu Hòa; Hồ Chí Minh City – Nguyễn Yến Linh; Huế – Trương Quí Minh Nhàn; Bắc Ninh – Nguyễn Lê Hà Phương; Hà Nội – Đào Minh Tâm; Đà Nẵng – Nguyễn Bùi Uyên Thảo; Đắk Lắk – Đinh Thị Triều Tiên; Nghệ An – Nguyễn Thị Quỳnh Trang; Cà Mau – Đoàn Ngọc Trân

==== Cosmo Best Body Award ====
Final Results	Contestants
Winner	Vĩnh Long – Nguyễn Thị Thùy Vi
Top 10	Hải Phòng – Mai Anh; Đà Nẵng – Ngô Thị Mỹ Hải; Cần Thơ – Nguyễn Phạm Thiên Kim; Gia Lai – Hoàng Kim Ngân; Tây Ninh – Bùi Hạnh Nguyên; Huế – Trương Quí Minh Nhàn; Đắk Lắk – Mlô H Senaivi; Hồ Chí Minh City – Phạm Huỳnh Thủy Tiên; Cà Mau – Đoàn Ngọc Trân

==== Cosmo Best Smile Award ====
Final Results	Contestants
Winner	Phú Thọ – Đỗ Cẩm Ly
Top 10	Vĩnh Long – Hồ Nguyễn Huế Anh; Hải Phòng – Mai Anh; Nghệ An – Lê Khánh Chi; Huế – Trương Quí Minh Nhàn; Bắc Ninh – Nguyễn Lê Hà Phương; Đắk Lắk – Mlô H Senaivi; Hà Nội – Đào Minh Tâm; Nghệ An – Nguyễn Thị Quỳnh Trang; Vĩnh Long – Nguyễn Thị Thùy Vi

== Contestants ==
Name of contestants	Year of Birth	No	Height	Hometown	Note
Lê Thu Hòa	1998	291	1,73 m	Ninh Bình	Top 10; Miss Popular Vote
Nguyễn Yến Linh	1992	187	1,69 m	Hồ Chí Minh City	
Nguyễn Đặng Thanh Tuyền	2001	482	1,77 m	Hồ Chí Minh City	Top 20; Miss Fashion
Nguyễn Hương Giang	2004	091	1,67 m	Lào Cai	
Lê Khánh Chi	2005	290	1,73 m	Nghệ An	
Vương Tú Vy	2001	094	1,67 m	Cần Thơ	
Phạm Thị Diễm Nhi	1996	175	1,67 m	Khánh Hòa	Top 20
Phạm Thị Minh Huệ	1999	486	1,82 m	Hải Phòng	Miss Congeniality
Trần Thu Huyền	2003	188	1,73 m	Đà Nẵng	
Trương Thị Thùy Trang	2000	483	1,73 m	Cần Thơ	Withdrew
Trần Hoàng Anh Phương	1996	088	1,70 m	Hà Nội	
Nguyễn Phạm Thiên Kim	2005	284	1,69 m	Cần Thơ	
Huỳnh Ngọc Kim Ngân	2005	392	1,77 m	Quảng Ngãi	Top 20
Đinh Thị Triều Tiên	1998	391	1,75 m	Đắk Lắk	Top 20
Bùi Thị Linh	2006	489	1,69 m	Hưng Yên	Top 20
Mlô H'Senaivi	2001	176	1,67 m	Đắk Lắk	
Nguyễn Lê Hà Phương	2005	278	1,70 m	Bắc Ninh	
Bùi Thị Thu Trang	1995	096	1,70 m	Hà Nội	
Phạm Phan Y Hạ	2001	477	1,83 m	Quảng Ngãi	
Lê Kim Quế Đan	2000	195	1,70 m	Đồng Nai	
Đỗ Cẩm Ly	2003	376	1,71 m	Phú Thọ	Runner-up; Cosmo Best Smile Award
Nguyễn Bùi Uyên Thảo	1999	280	1,74 m	Đà Nẵng	Top 20
Hồ Nguyễn Huế Anh	2000	283	1,71 m	Vĩnh Long	Top 10
Phạm Thị Kim Ngân	2004	379	1,74 m	Đồng Nai	
Nguyễn Hoàng Phương Linh	1999	383	1,75 m	Hồ Chí Minh City	Miss Cosmo Vietnam 2025
Nguyễn Thị Thuỳ Vi	2000	378	1,72 m	Vĩnh Long	Top 5 Miss Beach; Cosmo Best Body Award; Winner Online Contest
Đào Minh Tâm	2002	097	1,70 m	Hà Nội	Top 20; Cosmo Social Ambassador
Nguyễn Thị Trâm Anh	1997	100	1,67 m	Thanh Hóa	
Phạm Huỳnh Thủy Tiên	1995	478	1,80 m	Hồ Chí Minh City	Top 10; Miss Talent
Nguyễn Thị Thanh Thùy	1995	195	1,66 m	Hồ Chí Minh City	
Bùi Hạnh Nguyên	1997	476	1,87 m	Tây Ninh	
Trương Quí Minh Nhàn	2001	299	1,72 m	Huế	Top 5 Best Social Media
Nguyễn Ngọc Hương Giang	2003	377	1,71 m	Huế	
Nguyễn Thị Thu Thảo	1994	395	1,77 m	Lâm Đồng	Withdrew
Đoàn Thị Ngọc Hân	2002	387	1,76 m	Đồng Tháp	
Bùi Thị Thục Hiền	2000	488	1,69 m	Quảng Ngãi	
Mai Anh	1996	393	1,74 m	Hải Phòng	Top 10; Miss Sports
Mai Dạ Thảo	2003	381	1,77 m	Cần Thơ	Top 20
Đoàn Ngọc Trân	2001	398	1,70 m	Cà Mau	Miss Aodai
Võ Trương Hà Tiên	2002	298	1,75 m	Quảng Ngãi	
Nguyễn Lan Anh	2002	385	1,74 m	Bắc Ninh	Top 20
Nguyễn Thị Quỳnh Trang	2000	092	1,69 m	Nghệ An	Top 20
Ngô Thị Mỹ Hải	1994	279	1,70 m	Đà Nẵng	Top 10
Nguyễn Thị Thu	2002	375	1,75 m	Hưng Yên	
Hoàng Kim Ngân	2001	183	1,71 m	Gia Lai	Top 5 Miss Photogenic; Cosmo Best Face Award

== Miss Cosmo Vietnam 2025 Online Contest ==
=== Result ===
Final result	Contestants
Winner	Trà Vinh – Nguyễn Thị Thùy Vi
1st Runner-up	Phú Yên – Bùi Thị Thanh Thủy
2nd Runner-up	Nghệ An – Lê Khánh Chi
Top 10	Sóc Trăng – Đặng Thanh Ngân; Đắk Lắk – M'lô Senaini; Khánh Hòa – Phạm Thị Diễm Nhi; Hà Giang – Nông Thúy Hằng; Bình Dương – Huỳnh Ngọc Kim Ngân; Phú Yên – Đinh Thị Triều Tiên; Hồ Chí Minh City – Phạm Huỳnh Thủy Tiên

=== Top contestants participating in the online photo contest ===
Name of contestants	Year of Birth	Height	Hometown	Note
Đặng Thanh Ngân	1999	1,72 m	Sóc Trăng	2nd Runner-up Miss Ocean Vietnam 2017; Miss Supranational Vietnam 2023; 4th Runner-up Miss Supranational 2023
Bùi Thị Thanh Thủy	1997	1,68 m	Phú Yên	Singer; Top 16 Miss Cosmo Vietnam 2023; Top 15 Miss Grand Vietnam 2023
Nông Thúy Hằng	1999	1,70 m	Hà Giang	Miss Ethnic Vietnam 2022; Miss Friendship Vietnam 2023; 2nd Runner-up Miss Friendship International 2023
Mai Dạ Thảo	2003	1,74 m	Hậu Giang	Top 30 Vietnam's Next Top Model 2019
Đinh Thị Triều Tiên	1998	1,75 m	Phú Yên	Top 10 Miss Universe Vietnam 2024
Trần Thu Huyền	2003	1,74 m	Đà Nẵng	
Nguyễn Khánh Linh	2004	1,69 m	Hải Dương	
Nguyễn Thanh Hảo	1999	1,72 m	Vũng Tàu	
Nguyễn Bùi Uyên Thảo	1998	1,70 m	Gia Lai	
Nguyễn Thị Thu Cúc	1999	1,75 m	Trà Vinh	Top 20 Miss Grand Vietnam 2024
Nguyễn Thị Thu Thảo	1996	1,75 m	Bình Thuận	Top 16 Miss Universe Vietnam 2024
Bùi Hạnh Nguyên	1997	1,81 m	Long An	Top 8 Miss Global Vietnam 2024
Nguyễn Yến Linh	1992	1,69 m	Hồ Chí Minh City	
Nguyễn Huỳnh Anh Thư	2000	1,70 m	Tiền Giang	
Trần Thị Tú Hảo	2002	1,70 m	Tiền Giang	
Nguyễn Thị Hồng	2002	1,72 m	Bình Phước	
Hoàng Thị Bích Tuyền	1992	1,68 m	Cần Thơ	Top 12 Miss Bolero 2019
Đỗ Cẩm Ly	2003	1,73 m	Phú Thọ	
Nguyễn Thị Thùy Vi	2000	1,73 m	Trà Vinh	Miss Idol Vietnam 2024; Top 10 Miss Grand Vietnam 2023
Hồ Nguyễn Huế Anh	2000	1,71 m	Bến Tre	
Mai Hà Anh	2006	1,78 m	Đồng Tháp	
Huỳnh Ngọc Kim Ngân	2005	1,75 m	Bình Dương	
Nguyễn Ngọc Ánh Dương	2005	1,75 m	Hồ Chí Minh City	
Nguyễn Thị Thu	2002	1,73 m	Thái Bình	
Nguyễn Thị Yến Nhi	2000	1,60 m	Hồ Chí Minh City	
Võ Thị Huỳnh Như	2007	1,68 m	Hồ Chí Minh City	Miss Teen Icon International Vietnam 2023
Lê Khánh Chi	2005	1,72 m	Nghệ An	
Nguyễn Thị Hoài Thương	2005	1,70 m	Khánh Hòa	
Ngô Thị Cẩm Vân	1999	1,71 m	Phú Thọ	
Mlô Senaini	2001	1,68 m	Đắk Lắk	
Phạm Thị Diễm Nhi	1995	1,68 m	Khánh Hòa	
Trần Hoàng Anh Phương	1996	1,66 m	Hà Nội	Miss TikTok 2022
Ngô Thị Thùy Linh	2003	1,68 m	Quảng Ninh	
Lê Mai Ly	2007	1,68 m	Quảng Nam	
Lương Ngọc Khánh Vi	2004	1,67 m	An Giang	
Phạm Huỳnh Thủy Tiên	1995	1,81 m	Hồ Chí Minh City	Miss Asia in Australia 2020
Nguyễn Thị Duyên Ngọc	2000	1,67 m	Bình Thuận	
Nguyễn Hoàng Phương Linh	1999	1,74 m	Hồ Chí Minh City	
Nguyễn Hương Giang	2004	1,67 m	Yên Bái	
Lê Kim Quế Đan	2000	1,70 m	Đồng Nai	Top 29 Miss Universe Vietnam 2024
Nguyễn Mai Hương	2003	1,70 m	Lạng Sơn	Top 18 Miss International Culture Friendship 2025
Mai Anh	1996	1,78 m	Hải Phòng	
Thạch Thị Nhanh	2003	1,63 m	Vĩnh Long	Miss Biz Poly Cần Thơ 2022
Lê Nguyễn Uyên Nhi	2004	1,72 m	Đồng Nai	
Nguyễn Hà Phương	2007	1,69 m	Hà Nội	Miss and Mister 2023
Nguyễn Đoàn Thanh Mai	2000	1,74 m	Hưng Yên	
Nguyễn Thị Thu Hà	2003	1,68 m	Hà Nội	
Dương Xuân Phúc	2002	1,68 m	Bình Dương	Miss Bình Dương 2020
Nguyễn Phạm Thiên Kim	2005	1,71 m	Sóc Trăng	Top 10 Miss Grand Vietnam 2024
Nguyễn Lan Anh	1998	1,74 m	Bắc Ninh	Performer; Miss HCMC College of Stage Performance and Cinematics 2019; Top 10 Miss Ethnic Vietnam 2022
Nguyễn Anh Minh Thư	2006	1,69 m	Trà Vinh	Top 20 Miss Khmer Ethnic Beauties of Trà Vinh 2022
Đỗ Vân Anh	1994	1,64 m	Hà Nội	Fashion Designer
Trần Lê Minh Anh	2004	1,70 m	Hải Phòng	
Ngô Thị Mỹ Hải	1993	1,70 m	Đắk Lắk	2nd Runner-up Miss Tourism Vietnam 2020; Top 5 Miss Charming Vietnamese Female Students 2014
Nguyễn Thị Kim Châu	2006	1,74 m	Hồ Chí Minh City	
Nguyễn Thị Thanh Vân	2005	1,70 m	An Giang	
Trịnh Thị Tuyết Chi	1996	1,68 m	Hồ Chí Minh City	Top 20 Miss Teen Vietnam 2012; Top 10 Miss Sunplay 2014; Top 5 Miss Sony Vaio 2014
Ôn Thị Thu Hiền	2001	1,70 m	Vĩnh Phúc	
Nguyễn Thị Trâm Anh	1998	1,68 m	Thanh Hóa	

=== Rules and Prizes ===
- The voting portal and voting rules will be announced in detail on February 20, 2025
- The results of the Online Contest DO NOT AFFECT the results of the Miss Cosmo Vietnam 2025 contest
- The Organizing Committee will receive entries until March 31, 2025, after this date, any additional entries will not be counted.
- The Organizing Committee is allowed to use the images in the contestants' entries to promote the contest on the media without having to pay any fees.
- The Organizing Committee will not be responsible for any copyright disputes that the participants have provided.
- Winner - First Prize: 20,000,000 VND (highest total voting score)
- Runner-up - Second Prize: 10,000,000 VND (second highest total voting score)
