= HVA Investment Joint Stock Company =

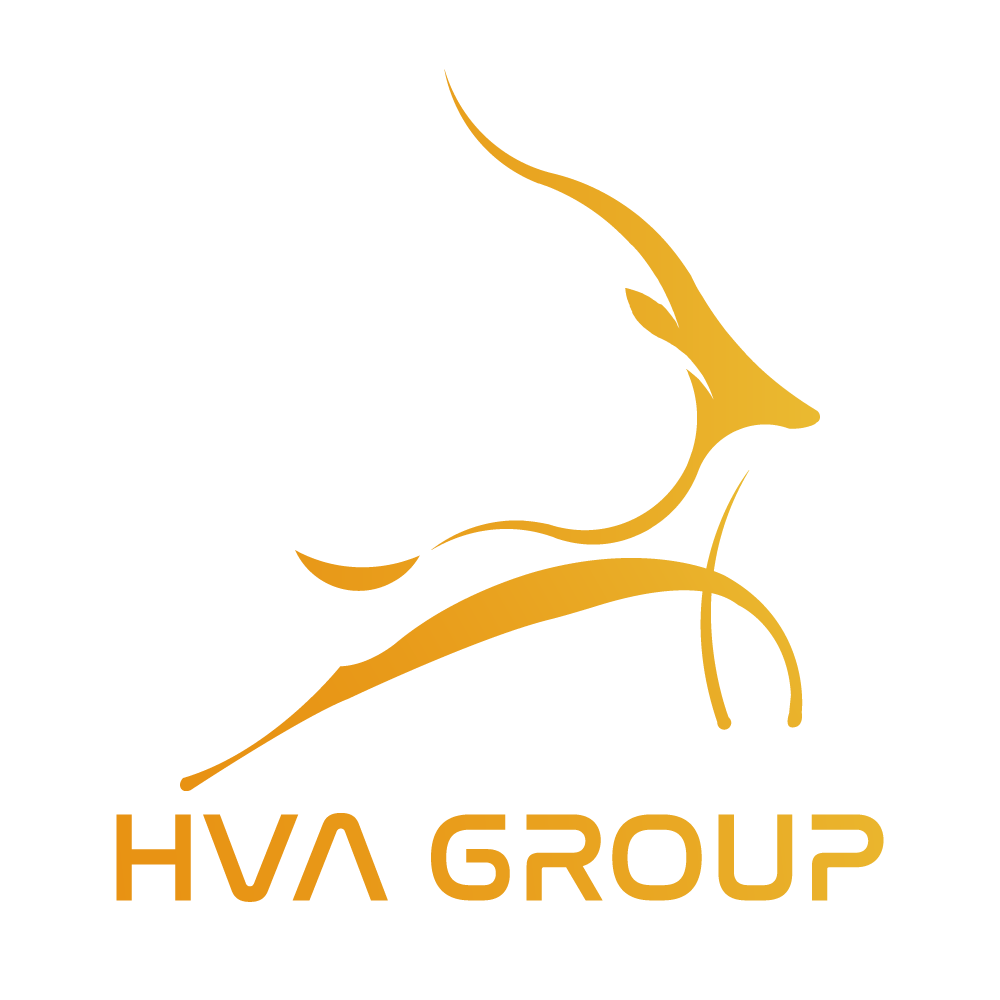
- Trade name: HVA Group
- Formerly: An Hung Installation Investment Joint Stock Hung Viet Green Agriculture JSC
- Type: Public
- Traded as: HVA
- Founded: 2010 May 19
- Headquarters: Can Tho city
- Key people: Eric Vuong (Vuong Le Vinh Nhan), Nguyễn Chí Công

HVA Investment Joint Stock Company (HVA Investment JSC) is a Vietnamese financial and investment firm headquartered in Can Tho City, Vietnam. Established on May 19, 2010, as An Hung Installation Investment Joint Stock Company, it became a public company listed on the Hanoi Stock Exchange (HNX) on March 5, 2015, under the ticker HVA and later transitioned to the UPCoM market. The company became the first public company in Vietnam to propose raising funds through an Initial Coin Offering (ICO) for a blockchain-based crowdfunding platform and projects. The company focuses on financial investments, technology, and blockchain, evolving from its initial operations in construction and agriculture.

== Board of Directors ==
Name	Position	Tenure
Eric Vuong	Chairman	Since May 16, 2020
Lê Hòa Nhã	Chief Executive Officer	Since November 14, 2023
Nguyễn Chí Công	Member of the Board	Since June 5, 2023
Trương Gia Bảo	Member of the Board	Since June 5, 2023
Trần Quang Chiến	Member of the Board	Since September 13, 2023
Tấn Lộc Louis	Member of the Board	Since September 13, 2023
Nguyễn Hoài Tưởng	Member of the Board	Since September 13, 2023

== History ==
HVA Group was founded on May 19, 2010, in Hanoi as An Hung Installation Investment Joint Stock Company, initially focusing on housing construction and completion. In 2014, it increased its charter capital to 50 billion VND and rebranded as Hung Viet Green Agriculture JSC, shifting to agriculture and listing on the HNX in March 2015. On March 5, 2015, it listed on the HNX with the ticker HVA, marking its entry into public markets. In 2017, the company moved its headquarters to Can Tho and rebranded as HVA Investment Joint Stock Company, shifting its focus to financial investments and consulting. That year, it gained attention as the first listed company in Vietnam to propose raising funds through an Initial Coin Offering (ICO) for a blockchain-based crowdfunding platform, aiming to secure 1,000 billion VND.

In 2018, Vuong Le Vinh Nhan (Eric Vuong) was elected Chairman during the Annual General Meeting on August 29, replacing Nguyễn Khánh Toàn, steering the company toward technology-driven finance. From 2019 to 2022, under Vuong Le Vinh Nhan’s leadership, total assets grew from 67.8 billion VND to 179 billion VND, equity from 56 billion VND to 159.8 billion VND, and net revenue from 650 million VND to 822.2 billion VND. By mid-2023, HVA’s stock transitioned to UPCoM, reflecting a period of financial recovery and strategic realignment. In 2024, HVA held its Annual General Meeting themed “Digital Financial Era” focusing on digital assets and blockchain technology, announcing plans to transfer to the Ho Chi Minh Stock Exchange (HOSE) by 2025; In October 2024, HVA partnered with VFilms to integrate blockchain and digital finance into film projects, expanding its tech portfolio.

== DNEX digital asset exchange plan ==
In September 2025, the company's shareholders approved a plan to organize and deploy the DNEX digital asset exchange in Da Nang with a cooperative investment scale of VND 10,000 billion.

Corporate registration records reported that CTCP Sàn giao dịch Tài sản số DNEX was incorporated on September 9, 2025, with charter capital of VND 2 billion and a registered head office at the MISA Building in Da Nang. The phased roadmap includes legal and infrastructure preparation, a sandbox pilot, and commercial rollout during 2025–2026.

=== DNEX digital asset exchange project ===
In September 2025, HVA Group announced plans to develop the DNEX digital asset exchange platform in Da Nang with a cooperative capital scale of 10,000 billion VND (approximately $400 million USD). The project is scheduled for implementation during 2025-2026 in three phases: legal preparation and technology infrastructure development, pilot operation under sandbox mechanisms, and commercial operation.

Strategic partners in the DNEX project include Onus Finance UAB, Alpha Securities JSC (APSC), Pacific Bridge Capital, SFVN Investment JSC, and Vemanti Group. The initiative aligns with Vietnam's pilot cryptocurrency market regulations under Government Resolution No. 5/2025/NQ-CP.

=== Government and institutional partnerships ===
HVA Group has established multiple cooperation agreements with the Da Nang People's Committee and local organizations, including partnerships for developing a regional financial-technology center. The company has participated in organizing major events including SURF 2025 (Startup and Innovation Competition) and Da Nang Finance and Technology Week 2025.

The company has also established partnerships with the Da Nang Startup and Innovation Support Center and signed cooperation agreements with Da Nang University of Economics.

=== Industry associations ===
HVA Group officially joined the Vietnam Blockchain and Digital Asset Association as a formal member.

== Regulatory Issues ==
On June 20, 2018, former chairman Nguyễn Khánh Toàn was fined 275 million VND for not reporting the sale of 940,000 shares, constituting stock market manipulation. On November 10, 2022, HVA was fined 81.95 million VND by the State Securities Commission for failing to comply with financial reporting requirements, a securities violation.
