= Nông Thúy Hằng =

Vietnamese model (born 1999)

- Born: 27 July 1999 (age 27); Ha Giang, Vietnam
- Education: National Economics University
- Beauty pageant titleholder
- Title: Miss Ethnic Vietnam 2022
- Major competitions: Miss World Vietnam 2019 (Unplaced); Miss Vietnam 2020 (Unplaced); Miss Ethnic Vietnam 2022 (Winner); Miss Friendship International 2023 (2nd Runner-up); Miss Cosmo Vietnam 2025 (Withdraw)

Nông Thúy Hằng (born July 27, 1999, in Ha Giang) is a Vietnamese beauty queen. She is Miss Ethnic Vietnam 2022 and will represent Vietnam at Miss Friendship International 2023 which was held in October in Pengzhou, Chengdu, China and placed as 2nd Runner-up.

== Early life and education ==
Nông Thúy Hằng was born in 1999 in Ha Giang. She studied the 10th and 11th grade in the Literature class of Ha Giang High School for the Gifted and then went to Hanoi to study in the 12th grade at the High School for the Gifted, Hanoi National University of Education. In the 11th grade, Thuy Hang won the 3rd prize of National Excellent Student in Literature.

== Pageantry ==
=== Miss Ethnic Vietnam 2022 ===
On July 16, the final night of Miss Ethnic Vietnam 2022 was officially held in Ho Chi Minh City. The top 30 beautiful girls, representing the ethnic groups in the territory of Vietnam, confidently expressed their best through the contests. In the end, Nong Thuy Hang – Tay ethnic group was crowned the highest position.

"Nếu có một cuộc thi quốc tế phù hợp, tôi chắc chắn sẽ tham gia. Bởi lẽ đó là cơ hội để tôi góp phần lan tỏa nhan sắc Việt đầy trí tuệ và nhân ái đồng thời mang đến cho bạn bè quốc tế hình ảnh Việt Nam giàu bản sắc".
English:
If there is a suitable international competition, I will definitely participate. Because it is an opportunity for me to contribute to spreading Vietnamese beauty full of wisdom and compassion, and at the same time bring to international friends a rich image of Vietnam.

— Nong Thuy Hang in her behavior test

Nong Thuy Hang won Miss Ethnic Vietnam 2022 which means she will be able to represent Vietnam at the Miss Earth 2022 contest, but because in 2023, Vietnam will host the contest. In order for the Miss Earth 2023 contest to take place in the best way, the host representative Vietnam should be the one who won the Miss Ethnic Vietnam contest, so she will participate in Miss Earth 2023 instead of Miss Earth 2022. And represent Vietnam at the event Miss Earth 2022 will be Thạch Thu Thảo. But after that, she was not able to attend Miss Earth 2023 because a new competition of Miss Earth Vietnam 2023, will be held to find a new representative.

=== Miss Friendship International 2023 ===
In 2023, she announced that she will represent Vietnam at the Miss Friendship International 2023 competition to be held in Pengzhou, Chengdu, China. On October 27, at the final show, she placed as 2nd Runner-up.

== Media and environmental activism ==
After winning the crown of Miss Ethnic Vietnam 2022, Nong Thuy Hang devoted a lot of enthusiasm to community-oriented activities. Recently, she returned to Ha Giang and helped students with difficult circumstances in her hometown. The program is part of a series of activities after the coronation of the new Miss named "Hành trình ước mơ tiếp nối" to improve the spirit of studiousness as well as support the development of disadvantaged children across the country.

Right after the coronation night a few days, Miss Nong Thuy Hang and 2 runner-up Luong Thi Hoa Dan – Thach Thu Thao and top 5 beauty Thao Lien along with 2 Miss Earth 2020 Lindsey Coffey – Miss Earth 2021 – Destiny Wagner had social activities. The first is the activity "Triệu cây xanh cho cuộc sống bừng sáng" in Binh Thuan, which is a social activity welcomed by Phan Thiet City People's Committee.

Awards and achievements
Preceded by Nguyễn Thị Ngọc Anh	Miss Ethnic Vietnam; 2022	Succeeded by Incumbent
Preceded by None	Miss Friendship Vietnam; 2023	Succeeded by Huỳnh Như Ý
Preceded by (Iceland) Sunneva Halldórsdóttir	2nd Runner-up Miss Friendship International; 2023	Succeeded by (Russia) Angela Mtalima
