= Nguyễn Hoàng Phương Linh =

Vietnamese beauty pageant titleholder (born 1999)

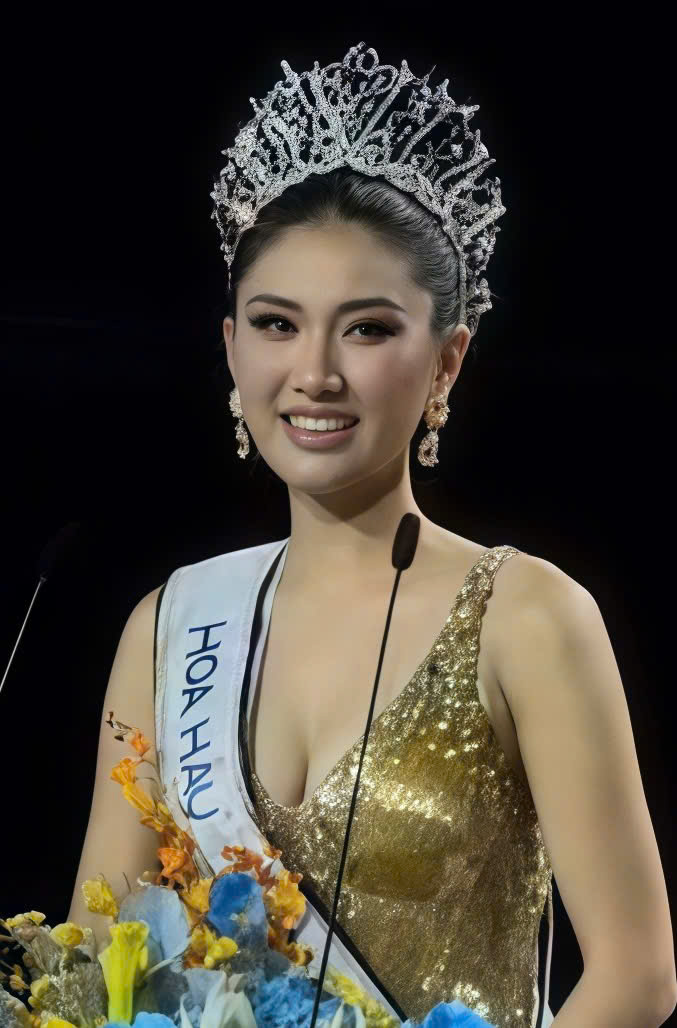
- Born: 5 April 1999 (age 27); Hồ Chí Minh City, Vietnam
- Education: University of Washington
- Beauty pageant titleholder
- Title: Miss Cosmo Vietnam 2025
- Major competitions: Miss Cosmo Vietnam 2025; (Winner); Miss Cosmo 2025; (Top 10)

Nguyễn Hoàng Phương Linh (born 5 April 1999) is a Vietnamese beauty pageant titleholder. She won Miss Cosmo Vietnam 2025 and represented Vietnam at Miss Cosmo 2025 where she placed in the Top 10.

== Early life ==
Linh was born on 5 April 1999 in Ho Chi Minh City. She is an IT technician at a domestic technology corporation.

Linh graduated from the University of Washington, majoring in Business and Information Technology Supply Chain Management. In addition, she completed a college program in Business in Houston. Before that, Linh worked at one of the four largest auditing corporations in the world as an information technology auditor.

== Pageantry ==
=== Miss Cosmo Vietnam 2025 ===
Linh won Miss Cosmo Vietnam 2025 on 21 June 2025.

During the Miss Cosmo Vietnam 2025 final, Linh shared about her Light to Life charity project. She said that the motivation behind the project was the increasing number of suicides due to depression each year. Linh added that she would apply technology to this project, for example, by building an app and a hotline to support as many people as possible, ensuring that no one calls and no one answers.

=== Miss Cosmo 2025 ===
Linh represented Vietnam at Miss Cosmo 2025 in December 2025, where she placed in the Top 10.

Awards and achievements
| Preceded by Bùi Thị Xuân Hạnh | Miss Cosmo Vietnam; 2025 | Succeeded by Đỗ Cẩm Ly |
