= Nguyễn Thị Loan =

Vietnamese model and beauty pageant titleholder

- Born: July 24, 1990 (age 36); Thái Bình, Vietnam
- Education: Thuongmai University
- Height: 1.75 m (5 ft 9 in)
- Beauty pageant titleholder
- Title: Miss Grand Vietnam 2016; Miss World Vietnam 2014; Miss Universe Vietnam 2017; 2nd Runner-Up Miss Ethnic Vietnam 2013
- Hair color: Black
- Eye color: Brown
- Major competitions: Miss Vietnam 2010 (Top 5); Miss Ethnic Vietnam 2013 (2nd Runner-Up); Miss World 2014 (Top 25); Miss Universe Vietnam 2015 (Top 5); Miss Grand International 2016 (Top 20); Miss Universe 2017 (Unplaced)

Nguyễn Thị Loan is a Vietnamese model and beauty pageant titleholder, she was the 2nd Runner-Up of the Miss Ethnic Vietnam 2013, she was appointed to Miss Grand Vietnam 2016, Miss World Vietnam 2014, Miss Universe Vietnam 2017 and she finished as a Top 25 semifinalist Miss World 2014 and Top 20 Miss Grand International 2016, she also represented Vietnam at Miss Universe 2017.

== Pageantry ==
=== Miss Vietnam 2010 ===
She first participated in a beauty contest at the Miss Vietnam 2010 and reached the top 5 finals with the Miss Beach Award.

=== Miss Ethnic Vietnam 2013 ===
She continued to participate and was crowned 2nd Runner-Up Miss Ethnic Vietnam 2013.

== Fashion show ==
Year	Role	Show	Collection	Designer	Note
2017	Vedette	Fashionology Festival 2017	TBA	Lê Ngọc Lâm	

Awards and achievements
Preceded by Sơn Thị Dura	Miss Ethnic Vietnam 2nd Runner-Up; 2013	Succeeded by Thạch Thu Thảo
Preceded by Lại Hương Thảo	Miss World Vietnam; 2014	Succeeded by Trần Ngọc Lan Khuê
Preceded by Nguyễn Thị Lệ Quyên	Miss Grand Vietnam; 2016	Succeeded by Nguyễn Trần Huyền My
Preceded by Đặng Thị Lệ Hằng	Miss Universe Vietnam; 2017	Succeeded by H'Hen Niê
