= University of Da Nang =

Public university in Vietnam

Coordinates: 16.0709°N 108.2194°E

University of Danang
- Đại học Đà Nẵng
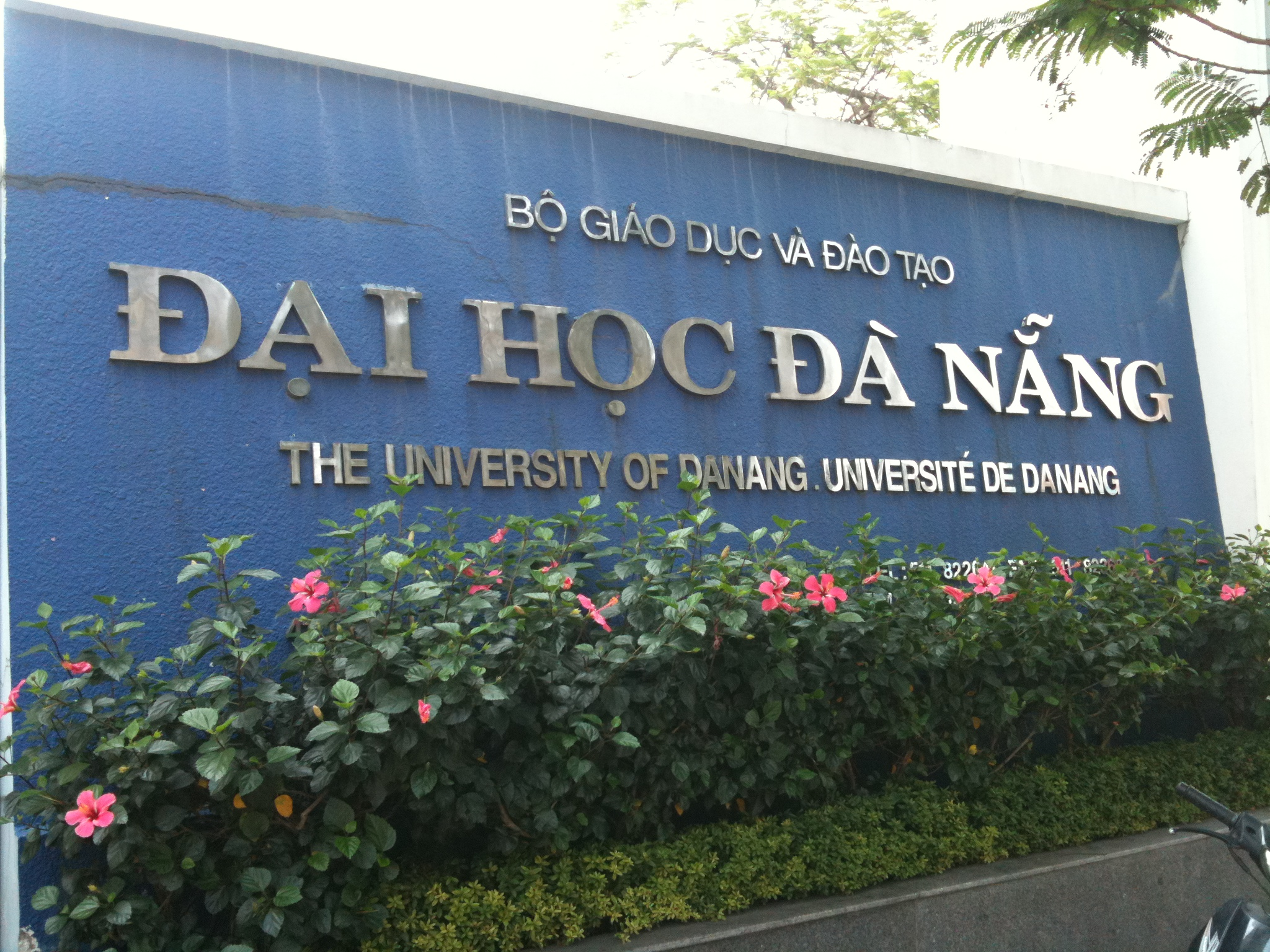
- Type: Public
- Established: April 4, 1994
- President: Nguyen Ngoc Vu
- Vice-president: Ngo Van Duong; Le Thanh Bac<; Le Quang Son
- Academic staff: 905
- Administrative staff: 433
- Students: 50,000
- Location: Da Nang, Vietnam
- Website: www.udn.vn/english

The University of Danang (Vietnamese: Đại học Đà Nẵng) is a regional multi-disciplinary university system in Central Vietnam.

== Organizational structure ==
The University of Danang was established on April 4, 1994, upon the rearrangement and reorganization of the former institutes:

- Polytechnic University
- Da Nang Foreign Language Teachers Training College
- Quang Nam Teachers Training College
- Nguyen Van Troi Vocational School

In line with Hue University and Thai Nguyen University, the university of Danang is one of three regional universities in Vietnam which have a wide variety of training levels.

As of 2020, the university of Danang consisted of:

- Six member universities:
1. University of Science and Technology (DUT)
2. Vietnam-Korea University of Information and Communication Technology (VKU)
3. University of Technology and Education (UTE)
4. University of Education (UED)
5. University of Economics (DUE)
6. University of Foreign Language Studies (UFLS)
- Three member schools:
1. School of Medicine and Pharmacy (SMP)
2. School of International Education
3. School of Physical Education
- Two research institutes:
1. VNUK Institute of Research and Executive education (VNUK)
2. Danang International Institute of Technology
- One campus:
1. UD's Campus in Kon Tum
- Ten centers for training and upgrading, scientific research promotion and technology transfer
- Journal of Science and Technology
- Maker Innovation Space

== Development orientation ==
The university of Danang consolidate assets such as laboratories, workshops, and libraries; expand the scope and training majors with focus on high technologies, curricula renovation, teaching methodologies, and applying scientific research results to practice to meet the renovation of national economy.

The Prime Minister has approved the master plan for the university of Danang, including an area of 300 hectares at Hoa Quy-Dien Ngoc, 15 km (9.3 mi) from Danang City center to the south-east. The preparation work for the construction site and the infrastructure have begun.
