= Da Nang University of Science and Technology =

University in Vietnam

The University of Da Nang - University of Science and Technology
- Trường Đại học Bách khoa, Đại học Đà Nẵng
- Type: Public
- Established: 1975
- Parent institution: University of Da Nang
- Director: Assoc.Prof.Dr Nguyễn Hữu Hiếu
- Location: 54 Nguyễn Lương Bằng, Hòa Khánh Bắc ward, Liên Chiểu district, Da Nang, Vietnam
- Website: en.dut.udn.vn

Da Nang University of Science and Technology (DUT; Vietnamese: Trường Đại học Bách khoa, Đại học Đà Nẵng), or UDN University of Science and Technology, is one of the most important universities of technology in Vietnam.

The university is a member of University of Da Nang system.

== See also ==
- University of Da Nang
- Da Nang University of Economics
