= Đỗ Cẩm Ly =

Vietnamese beauty pageant titleholder (born 1999)

- Born: 12 November 2003 (age 23); Phú Thọ province, Vietnam
- Education: Ho Chi Minh City University of Social Sciences and Humanities
- Beauty pageant titleholder
- Major competitions: Miss Cosmo Vietnam 2025; (Runner-Up); Miss Cosmo 2026; (TBD)

Đỗ Cẩm Ly (born 12 November 2003) is a Vietnamese model and beauty pageant titleholder. She was the runner-up at Miss Cosmo Vietnam 2025 and will then represent Vietnam at Miss Cosmo 2026.

== Early life ==
She was born in 2003 in Phú Thọ province. As of 2025, Ly has lived and worked in Ho Chi Minh City. She graduated with a degree in international relations from the Ho Chi Minh City University of Social Sciences and Humanities. She was formerly a member of the external relations team at Model United Nations, an organization that fosters critical thinking and independent analytical skills. She worked on a community project in the field of education called the Education Caravan, aiming to bring knowledge to disadvantaged areas lacking educational opportunities.

In September 2025, she launched the University Tour series as part of the Education Caravan community project, aiming to spread the spirit of "development from within" and accompany the younger generation on their journey of knowledge. The first leg of the project visited three key locations: Ho Chi Minh City University of Industry, the University of Social Sciences and Humanities - VNU-HCM, and the Student Cultural Center - VNU-HCM.

== Pageant ==
=== Miss Cosmo Vietnam 2025 ===
She participated in a national beauty pageant for the first time and was crowned runner-up at Miss Cosmo Vietnam 2025 on the evening of June 21, 2025 in Nha Trang. She was crowned by her predecessor, Hoàng Thị Nhung - Runner-up of Miss Cosmo Vietnam 2023.

=== Miss Cosmo 2026 ===
On June 10, 2026, she was officially appointed as Miss Cosmo Vietnam 2026 and will represent Vietnam at the Miss Cosmo 2026 competition.

Awards and achievements
Preceded by Nguyễn Hoàng Phương Linh	Miss Cosmo Vietnam; 2026	Incumbent
