= Thạch Thu Thảo =

Vietnam pageant contestant

- Born: Thạch Thu Thảo; 13 August 2001 (age 25); Trà Vinh, Việt Nam
- Height: 1.77 m (5 ft 9 1/2 in)
- Beauty pageant titleholder
- Title: Miss South Can Tho University 2021; Miss Earth Vietnam 2022
- Major competitions: Miss South Can Tho University 2021 (Winner); Miss Universe Vietnam 2022 (Unplaced); Miss Ethnic Vietnam 2022 (2nd Runner-Up); Miss Earth 2022 (Top 20)

Thạch Thu Thảo (born 13 August 2001) is a Vietnamese model and beauty pageant titleholder. She placed 2nd Runner-Up at Miss Ethnic Vietnam 2022 and was later appointed as Miss Earth Vietnam 2022. She represented Vietnam at the Miss Earth 2022 pageant and placed at the Top 20.

== Early life and education ==
Thảo was born and raised in Trà Vinh and is a member of Vietnam's ethnic Khmer Krom minority. She is also a student at South Can Tho University.

== Pageantry ==
=== Miss South Can Tho University 2021 ===
In 2021, she participated in the Miss South Can Tho University pageant and excellently crowned the highest position overall.

=== Miss Universe Vietnam 2022 ===
In 2022, she registered to compete in the 5th season of Miss Universe Vietnam and ended in 71st place.

=== Miss Ethnic Vietnam 2022 ===
After stopping at the Top 71 Miss Universe Vietnam 2022, she continued to register for the Miss Ethnic Vietnam 2022 contest, finally she was crowned the 2nd runner-up and received the sub-award of Miss Ethnic Fashion.

=== Miss Earth 2022 ===
During the press conference of Nova Entertainment Company about hosting the Miss Earth 2023 contest in Nha Trang, Vietnam, Thu Thao was announced to be the next representative of Vietnam at Miss Earth 2022, which was presented held in the Philippines. In the final show, she placed Top 20.

Awards and achievements
Preceded by Nguyễn Thị Vân Anh	Miss Earth Vietnam; 2022	Succeeded by Đỗ Thị Lan Anh
Preceded by Nguyễn Thị Loan	2nd Runner-Up Miss Ethnic Vietnam; 2022	Succeeded by Incumbent
