= Miss Ethnic Vietnam =

- Formation: 2007; 19 years ago
- Type: Beauty contest
- Headquarters: Ho Chi Minh City
- Location: Vietnam
- Members: Miss Friendship International (2023-present); Miss Earth (2022)
- Official language: Vietnamese
- Miss Ethnic Vietnam 2022: Nông Thúy Hằng
- From: Hà Giang
- Ethnic: Tày
- Key people: Trương Ngọc Ánh
- Affiliations: Nova Entertainment

Miss Ethnic Vietnam is the national level beauty contest of Vietnam, which was born in 2007. The contest was originally organized by CIAT, but in 2013 the organizers discontinued the contest. In 2021, the contest is once again announced to return to 2022 by Nova Entertainment.

== Miss Ethnic Vietnam all winner ==
| Year | Miss Ethnic Vietnam | First Runner-up | Second Runner-up |
|---|---|---|---|
| 2022 | Nông Thúy Hằng; Hà Giang | Lương Thị Hoa Đan; Hải Dương | Thạch Thu Thảo; Trà Vinh |
| 2013 | Nguyễn Thị Ngọc Anh; Thanh Hóa | Lò Thị Minh; Điện Biên | Nguyễn Thị Loan; Thái Bình |
| 2011 | Triệu Thị Hà; Cao Bằng | Phạm Thị Thanh Tuyền; Hải Phòng | Sơn Thị Dura; Trà Vinh |
| 2007 | Nguyễn Thị Hoàng Nhung; Thái Nguyên | Trương Thị May; Phnom Penh | H'Rô Ni Buôn Ya; Đắk Lắk |

== Miss Ethnic Vietnam representatives at International beauty pageants ==
=== Miss Friendship International ===
| Year | Represent | Province | National title | Result | Prize |
| 2023 | Nông Thúy Hằng | Hà Giang | Miss Ethnic Vietnam 2022 | 2nd Runner-up | |

== Past Franchises ==
=== Miss Earth ===
| Year | Represent | Province | National title | Result | Prize |
| 2022 | Thạch Thu Thảo | Trà Vinh | 2nd Runner-up Miss Ethnic Vietnam 2022 | Top 20 | |
| 2019 | Hoang Thi Hanh | Nghệ An | Top 18 Miss Ethnic Vietnam 2013 | Unplaced | |

=== Miss Universe ===
| Year | Represent | Province | National title | Result | Prize |
| 2017 | Nguyễn Thị Loan | Thái Bình | 2nd Runner-up Miss Ethnic Vietnam 2013 | Unplaced | |
| 2016 | Đặng Thị Lệ Hằng | Đà Nẵng | Top 18 Miss Ethnic Vietnam 2013 | Unplaced | 1 Special Award: Best National Costume (Top 12) |
| 2013 | Trương Thị May | Hồ Chí Minh City | 1st Runner-up Miss Ethnic Vietnam 2007 | Unplaced | |

=== Miss World ===
| Year | Represent | Province | National title | Result | Prize |
| 2014 | Nguyễn Thị Loan | Thái Bình | 2nd Runner-up Miss Ethnic Vietnam 2013 | Top 25 | |

=== Miss Grand International ===
| Year | Represent | Province | National title | Result | Prize |
| 2016 | Nguyễn Thị Loan | Thái Bình | 2nd Runner-up Miss Ethnic Vietnam 2013 | Top 20 | |

== See also ==
- Miss Vietnam
- Miss World Vietnam
- Miss Earth Vietnam
- Miss Grand Vietnam
- Miss Supranational Vietnam
- List of Vietnam representatives at international women beauty pageants
