= Da Nang University of Economics =

Vietnamese university

Coordinates: 16°2′52″N 108°14′21″E

University of Economics - The University of Da Nang
- Trường Đại học Kinh tế - Đại học Đà Nẵng
- Type: Public
- Established: 1975
- Parent institution: University of Da Nang
- Director: Assoc. Prof Le Van Huy
- Administrative staff: 500
- Location: 71 Ngũ Hành Sơn, Ngũ Hành Sơn district, Da Nang city, Vietnam
- Website: https://due.udn.vn

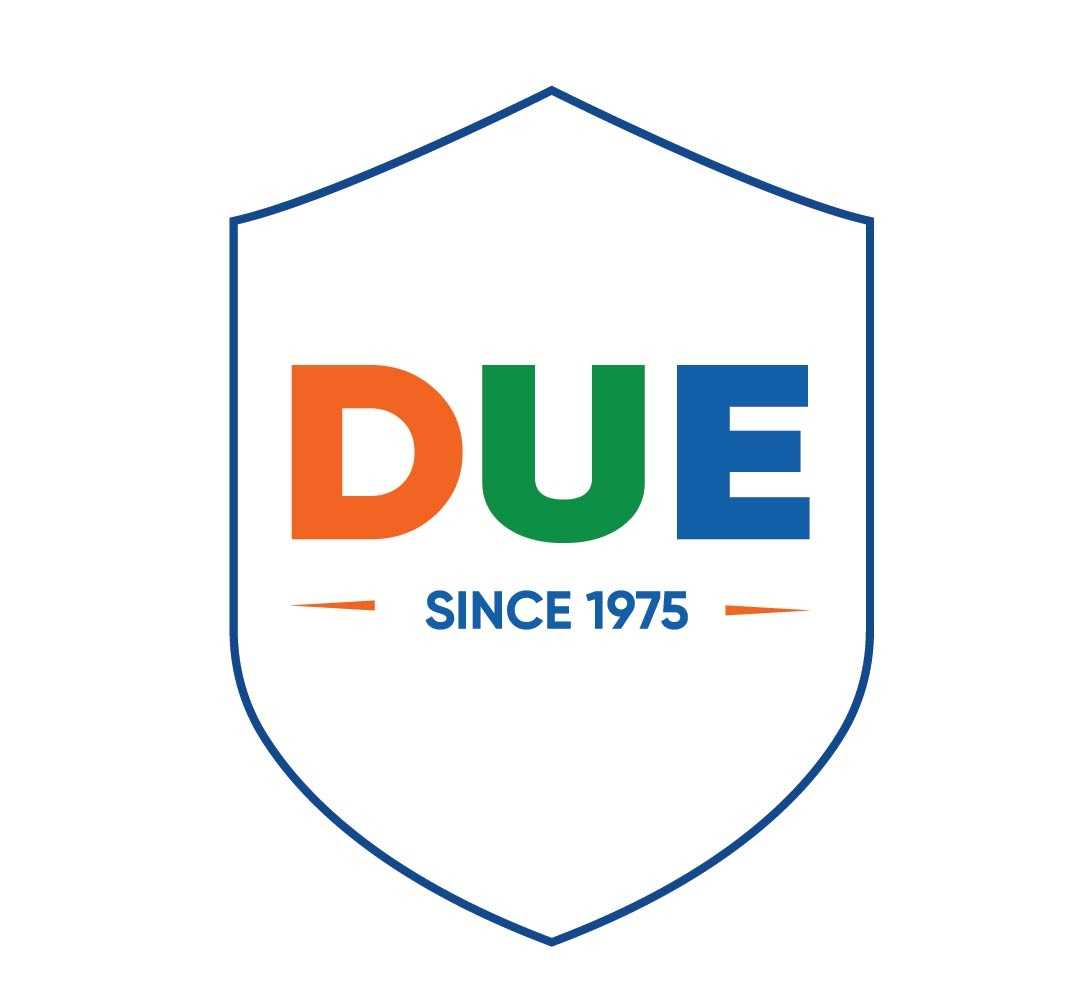
Logo DUE

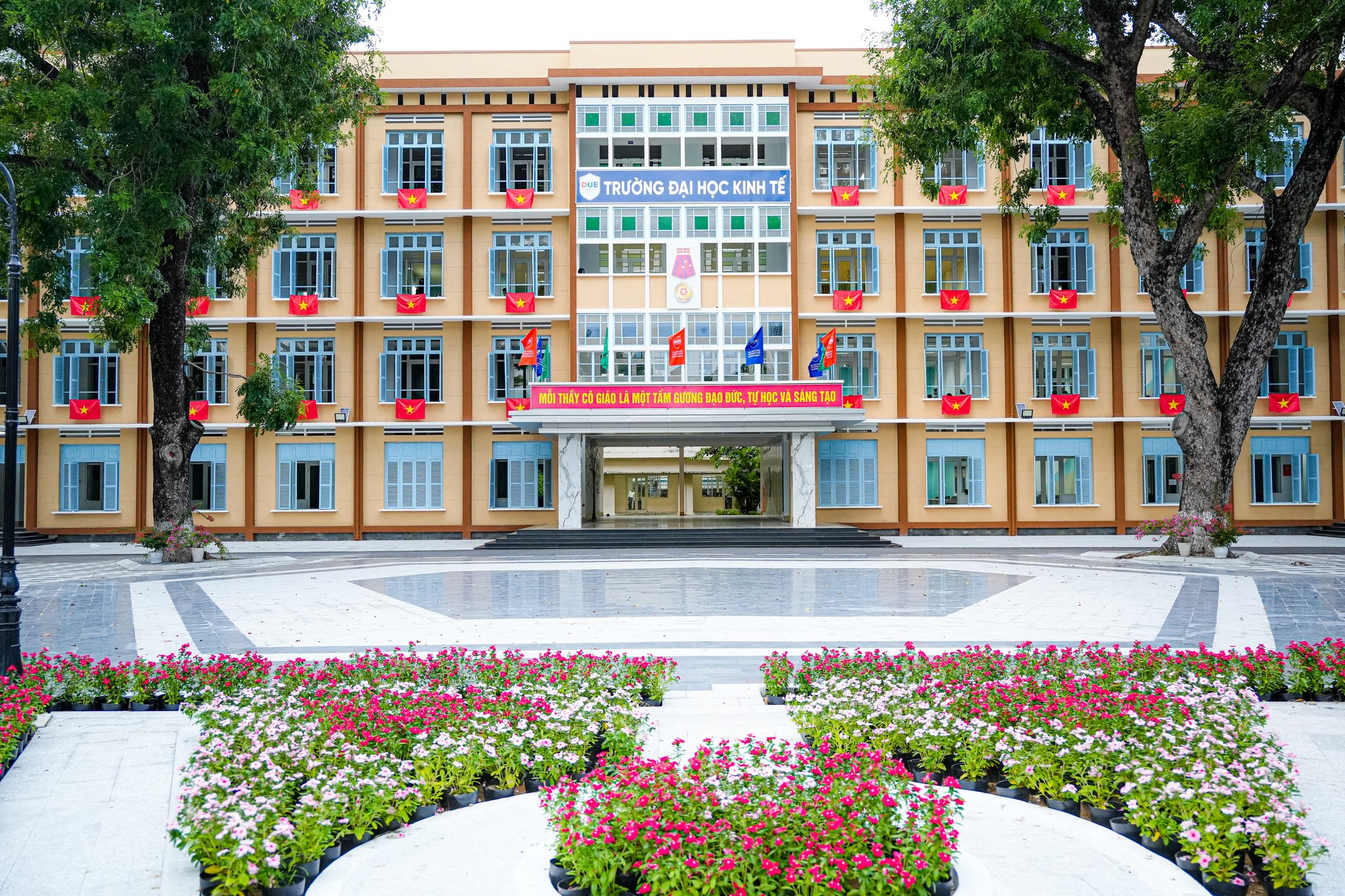
Building A of DUE

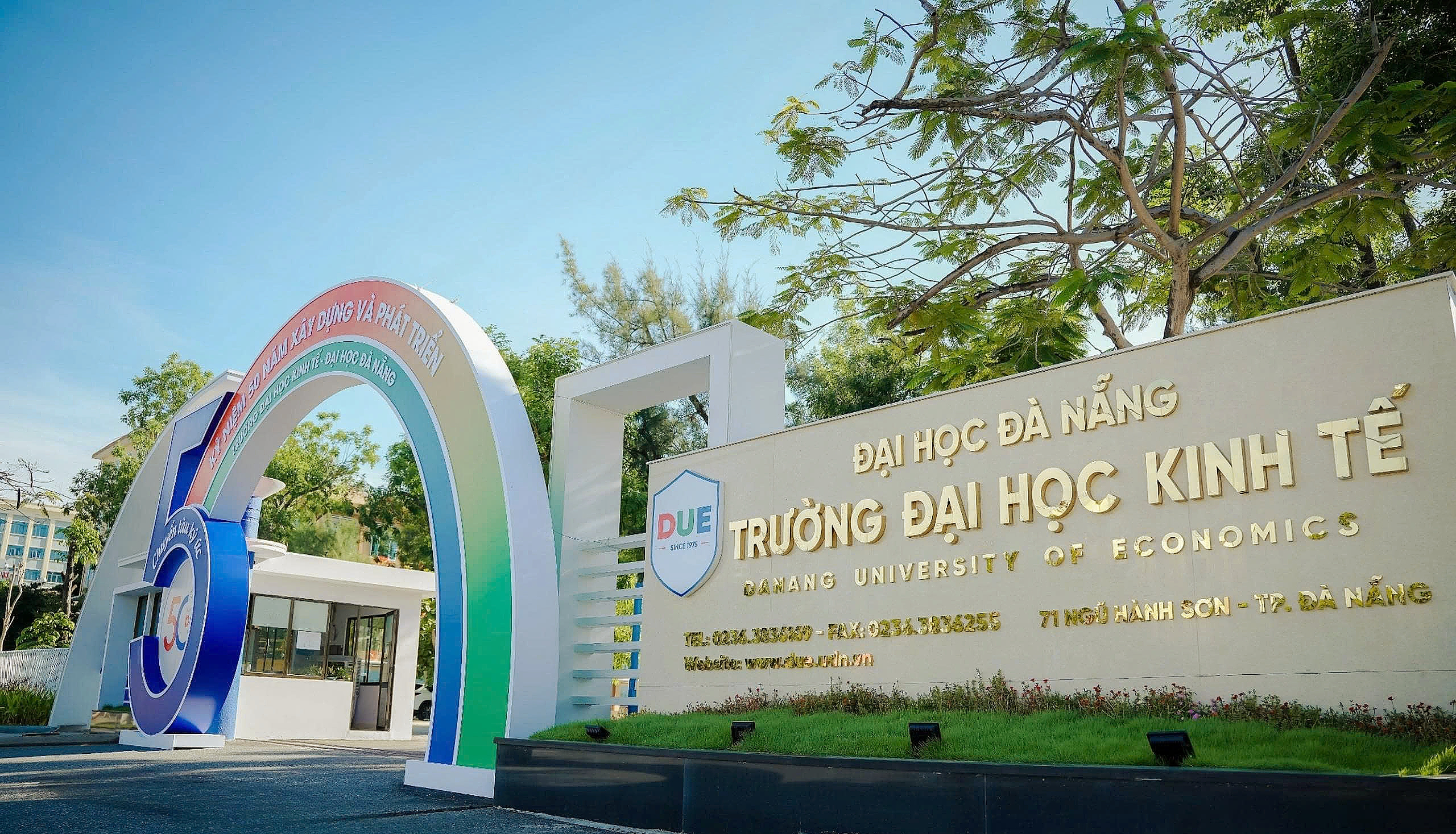
Cong truong 50 nam DUE

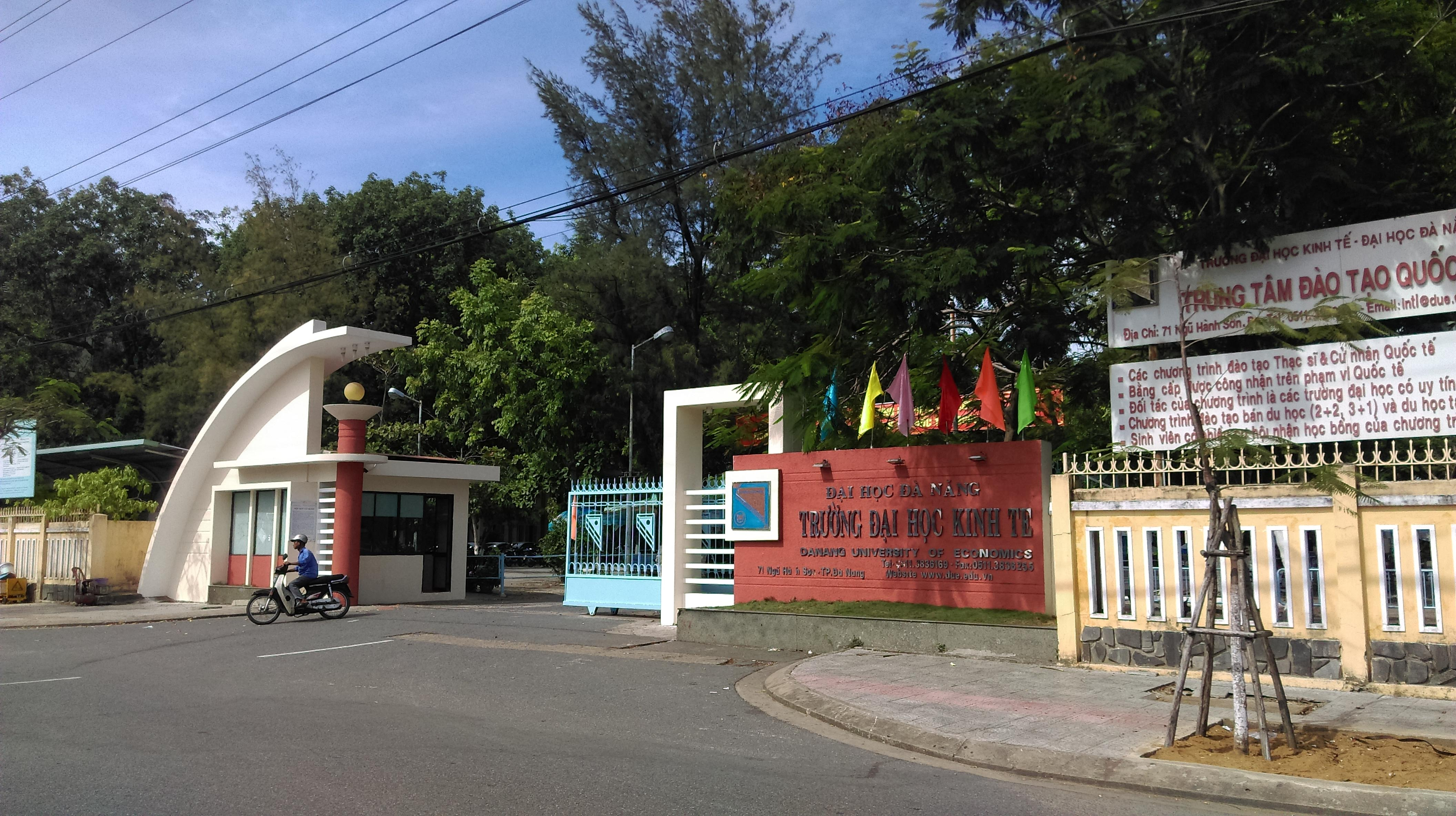
Da nang.jpeg

The University of Economics - The University of Da Nang (Vietnamese: Trường Đại học Kinh tế - Đại học Đà Nẵng), or Da Nang University of Economics (DUE), is a university located in Da Nang, Vietnam. It was formerly known as University of Economics and Business Administration (Vietnamese: Trường Đại học Kinh tế và Quản trị Kinh doanh). This university is a member of regional university system — University of Da Nang.

== History ==
Beginning as the Faculty of Economics of Da Nang Polytechnic University, a public university established in 1976, the university became its own institution in 1994, when a number of major educational institutions in Da Nang were reorganized. It is the largest university of economics in central Vietnam and the first to be established. The campus is at 71 Ngu Hanh Son Street, Ngu Hanh Son District, Da Nang.

== Academia ==
University of Economics - The University of Da Nang includes twelve main faculties:

Faculty	Est.	Undergraduate Study	Graduate Study
Faculty of Accounting	1994	Bachelor of Economics, majored in: 1. Accounting; 2. Auditing	1. Master of Accounting; 2. PhD in Accounting
Faculty of Business Administration	1994	Bachelor of Economics, majored in: 1. General Business Administration; 2. Human Resource Management; 3. Supply Chain & Logistics Management; 4. Digital Business	1. Master of Business Administration; 2. PhD in Business Administration
Faculty of Banking	2014	Bachelor of Economics, specialized in: 1. Banking; 2. Public Finance	1. Master of Finance and Banking
Faculty of E-Commerce	2018	Bachelor of Economics, specialized in: 1. Commerce; 2. E-Commerce; 3. Data Science	
Faculty of Economics	1976	Bachelor of Economics, specialized: 1. Development Economics; 2. Investment Economics; 3. International Economics	1. Master of Development Economics; 2. Master of Economic Management; 3. PhD in Economics
Faculty of Finance	1986	Bachelor of Economics, specialized in: 1. Corporate Finance; 2. Financial Management; 3. Financial Technology	1. Master of Finance and Banking
Faculty of International Business	2018	Bachelor of Economics, specialized in: 1. Foreign Trade	
Faculty of Law	2010	Bachelor of Economics, specialized in: 1. Business Law; 2. Legal Study	
Faculty of Marketing	2014	Bachelor of Economics, specialized in: 1. Marketing Management; 2. Marketing Communication; 3. Digital Marketing	
Faculty of Political Economics	2020	Bachelor of Economics, specialized in: 1. Public Administration; 2. Political Economics	1. Master of Philosophy
Faculty of Statistics and Informatics	1986	Bachelor of Economics, specialized in: 1. Statistics; 2. Management Information System; 3. Management Economics Statistics	1. Master of Economic and Social Statistics
Faculty of Tourism	2012	Bachelor of Economics, specialized in: 1. Tourism Business Management; 2. Hospitality Management; 3. Event Management	1. PhD in Agricultural Economics; 2. PhD in Industrial Economics

== See also ==
- University of Da Nang
- Da Nang University of Technology
