= Miss Grand Vietnam 2023 =

Beauty pageant edition

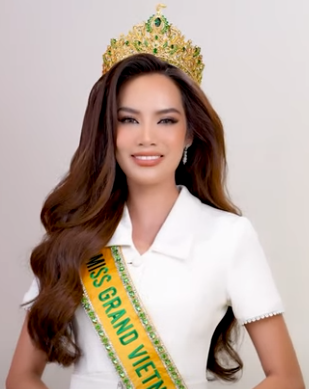
- Lê Hoàng Phương
- Date: August 27, 2023
- Presenters: Lương Thùy Linh; Thiên Vũ
- Venue: Phú Thọ Indoor Stadium, District 11, Ho Chi Minh City
- Broadcaster: YouTube; Facebook Live
- Entrants: 48
- Placements: 20
- Winner: Lê Hoàng Phương, Khánh Hòa
- Best National Costume: Vũ Khúc Thiên Long – Nguyễn Lê Vĩnh Tường (performed by Hồ Nguyễn Huế Anh)

Miss Grand Vietnam 2023 was the second Miss Grand Vietnam pageant, held at the Phú Thọ Indoor Stadium in Ho Chi Minh City, Vietnam, on August 27, 2023.

Đoàn Thiên Ân of Long An crowned Lê Hoàng Phương of Khánh Hoà as her successor at the end of the event. She represented Vietnam at Miss Grand International 2023, and was the fourth runner-up.

== Background ==
=== Date and venue ===
The press conference for the Miss Grand Vietnam 2023 pageant was on February 5, 2023, in Ho Chi Minh City, in which the event organizer, Sen Vang Entertainment, stated that this year's edition will consist of five main sub-events, including the Best in Swimsuit Contest, the Vietnam Fashion Festival, the National Costume Contest, the preliminary round, and the grand final coronation. At the same event, the schedule for the Miss World Vietnam 2023 and the new Miss National Vietnam 2023 pageants were announced.

The following is a list of the sub-events of the Miss Grand Vietnam 2023 contest.

Date	Event	Venue	Ref.
August 4	Sash ceremony	South Saigon Marina Club, District 7, Ho Chi Minh City	
August 16	Vietnam Beauty Fashion Fest 5	White Place Pham Van Dong, Thu Duc City	
August 16	Best in Swimsuit competition	White Place Pham Van Dong, Thu Duc City	
August 19	National Costume competition	Phú Thọ Indoor Stadium, District 10, Ho Chi Minh City	
August 23	Preliminary competition	Phú Thọ Indoor Stadium, District 10, Ho Chi Minh City	
August 27	Grand final coronation	Phú Thọ Indoor Stadium, District 10, Ho Chi Minh City	

=== Selection of contestants ===
The national finalists for the pageant were selected by the organizer, with no regional pageants held to determine the province representatives. The primary screening was done virtually, with the selected candidates having an in-person screening and interview in Ho Chi Minh City on July 15 to select the final candidates.

== Results ==
=== Placements ===
Color keys

- Declared as the winner in an International pageant.
- Ended as Runner-up in an International pageant.
- Ended as finalist or semifinalist in an International pageant.
- Unplaced.

Placement	Contestant	International pageant
Miss Grand Vietnam 2023	Khánh Hòa – Lê Hoàng Phương	4th runner-up – Miss Grand International 2023
1st Runner-up	Bắc Giang – Bùi Khánh Linh	
2nd runner-up	Thừa Thiên Huế – Trương Quí Minh Nhàn	
3rd runner-up	Thái Bình – Lê Thị Hồng Hạnh	
4th runner-up	Thừa Thiên Huế – Đặng Hoàng Tâm Như (¥)	
Top 10	Trà Vinh – Nguyễn Thị Thùy Vi (§); Ho Chi Minh City – Nguyễn Vĩnh Hà Phương; Hà Nam – Phạm Thị Hằng Nga; Long An – Trần Hồng Ngọc; Hanoi – Nguyễn Thị Thu Hằng (€)	
Top 15	Ho Chi Minh City – Bùi Thị Thục Hiền; Phú Yên – Bùi Thị Thanh Thủy; Hanoi – Phạm Liên Anh; Quảng Nam – Nguyễn Thị Diễm Quyên; Đồng Nai – Phạm Hoàng Kim Dung; Bình Thuận – Phạm Thị Ánh Vương	
Top 20	Cao Bằng – Nguyễn Hồng Diễm; Ho Chi Minh City – Dương Thị Hồng Vy; Hanoi – Phùng Thị Thủy; Đắk Lắk – Võ Quỳnh Thư	

(§) – placed into the Top 10 by Miss Popular Vote
(¥) – placed into the Top 10 by Miss Inspiration
(€) – placed into the Top 20 by Best in Swimsuit

== Contestants ==
44 delegates participated.

Contestants	Age	Height	Province	Placement
Phạm Liên Anh	20	1.68 m (5 ft 6 in)	Hanoi	Top 15
Hồ Nguyễn Huế Anh	23	1.71 m (5 ft 7 1/2 in)	Bến Tre	
Nguyễn Hoài Phương Anh	22	1.70 m (5 ft 7 in)	Bà Rịa–Vũng Tàu	
Trần Thị Phương Anh	23	1.74 m (5 ft 8 1/2 in)	Nam Định	
Huỳnh Phương Anh	23	1.77 m (5 ft 9 1/2 in)	Bến Tre	
Trần Khả Di	22	1.71 m (5 ft 7 1/2 in)	Cà Mau	
Nguyễn Hồng Diễm	25	1.76 m (5 ft 9 1/2 in)	Cao Bằng	Top 20
Phạm Hoàng Kim Dung	26	1.69 m (5 ft 6 1/2 in)	Đồng Nai	Top 15
Nguyễn Thùy Dương	23	1.69 m (5 ft 6 1/2 in)	Bạc Liêu	
Dương Tiểu Hân	23	1.67 m (5 ft 5 1/2 in)	Bà Rịa–Vũng Tàu	
Nguyễn Thị Thu Hằng	22	1.69 m (5 ft 6 1/2 in)	Hanoi	Top 10
Lê Thị Hồng Hạnh	23	1.68 m (5 ft 6 in)	Thái Bình	3rd Runner-up
Bùi Thị Thục Hiền	23	1.68 m (5 ft 6 in)	Ho Chi Minh City	Top 15
Phạm Thị Minh Huệ	24	1.81 m (5 ft 11 1/2 in)	Hải Dương	
Nguyễn Ngọc Bảo Huyên	20	1.72 m (5 ft 7 1/2 in)	Ho Chi Minh City	
Nguyễn Minh Hoàng Kim	21	1.69 m (5 ft 6 1/2 in)	Ho Chi Minh City	
Võ Pha Lê	21	1.67 m (5 ft 5 1/2 in)	Cà Mau	
Bùi Khánh Linh	21	1.77 m (5 ft 9 1/2 in)	Bắc Giang	1st Runner-up
Trần Khánh Linh	22	1.68 m (5 ft 6 in)	Hanoi	
Lục Hồng Mai	22	1.70 m (5 ft 7 in)	Hanoi	
Phạm Thị Hằng Nga	24	1.73 m (5 ft 8 in)	Hà Nam	Top 10
Trần Nguyễn Kim Ngân	20	1.74 m (5 ft 8 1/2 in)	Ho Chi Minh City	
Nguyễn Ngọc Thanh Ngân	23	1.71 m (5 ft 7 1/2 in)	Ho Chi Minh City	
Trần Hồng Ngọc	22	1.73 m (5 ft 8 in)	Long An	Top 10
Trương Quí Minh Nhàn	22	1.72 m (5 ft 7 1/2 in)	Thừa Thiên Huế	2nd Runner-up
Lê Thị Tuyết Nhi	23	1.74 m (5 ft 8 1/2 in)	Bình Phước	
Đặng Hoàng Tâm Như	24	1.75 m (5 ft 9 in)	Thừa Thiên Huế	4th Runner-up
Nguyễn Vĩnh Hà Phương	20	1.69 m (5 ft 6 1/2 in)	Ho Chi Minh City	Top 10
Lê Hoàng Phương	28	1.76 m (5 ft 9 1/2 in)	Khánh Hòa	Miss Grand Vietnam 2023
Lê Minh Lan Phương	24	1.76 m (5 ft 9 1/2 in)	Ho Chi Minh City	
Nguyễn Trúc Phương	19	1.68 m (5 ft 6 in)	Cà Mau	
Nguyễn Thị Diễm Quyên	19	1.72 m (5 ft 7 1/2 in)	Quảng Nam	Top 15
Trần Thị Tú Quyên	24	1.73 m (5 ft 8 in)	Bạc Liêu	
Nguyễn Thị Thu Thảo	27	1.77 m (5 ft 9 1/2 in)	Bình Thuận	
Võ Quỳnh Thư	24	1.71 m (5 ft 7 1/2 in)	Đắk Lắk	Top 20
Bùi Thị Thanh Thủy	26	1.68 m (5 ft 6 in)	Phú Yên	Top 15
Phùng Thị Thủy	27	1.73 m (5 ft 8 in)	Hanoi	Top 20
Phạm Thị Thùy Trang	26	1.74 m (5 ft 8 1/2 in)	Hải Dương	
Nguyễn Thị Cẩm Tú	20	1.68 m (5 ft 6 in)	Hải Phòng	
Nguyễn Thị Thùy Vi	23	1.72 m (5 ft 7 1/2 in)	Trà Vinh	Top 10
Phạm Thị Ánh Vương	21	1.73 m (5 ft 8 in)	Bình Thuận	Top 15
Lý Hiểu Vy	23	1.72 m (5 ft 7 1/2 in)	Ho Chi Minh City	
Dương Thị Hồng Vy	24	1.66 m (5 ft 5 1/2 in)	Ho Chi Minh City	Top 20
Nguyễn Thảo Vy	21	1.68 m (5 ft 6 in)	Tây Ninh	

== Judges ==
- Hà Kiều Anh – Miss Vietnam 1992, Jury president
- Hoang Nhat Nam – Sen Vàng Productions director, Jury vice-president
- Nguyễn Thúc Thùy Tiên – Miss Grand International 2021 from Vietnam
- Nguyễn Minh Tú – Silver award Supermodel Vietnam 2013, Miss Supranational Asia 2018
- Nguyễn Hà Kiều Loan – Singer, Miss World Vietnam 2019 1st Runner-up
- Đỗ Long – Fashion designer
- Vũ Phạm Diễm My – Actress
- Vương Duy Biên – Vice President of the Vietnam Union of Literature and Arts Associations – Course X
